= Arthur Allan Thomas =

Wrongfully convicted New Zealander

- Born: January 2, 1938 (age 88); Pukekawa, North Island, New Zealand
- Occupation: Farmer
- Known for: Wrongfully convicted of murder

Arthur Allan Thomas (born 2 January 1938) is a New Zealand man who was twice wrongfully convicted of the murders of Harvey and Jeannette Crewe in June 1971.

== Early life ==
Thomas was one of nine children born to Allan and Ivy Thomas. He was raised on his parents' 272-acre farm in the small affluent community of Pukekawa, on New Zealand's North Island. At age 14, Allan Thomas pulled his son from school to work on their farm; Arthur would spend the next five years as an unpaid labourer on his father's farm. In 1957, when he turned 19, Arthur began working as a Ferry Captain on the Mercer Ferry. Thomas later stated that, while in school, he had a "crush" on Jeannette Demler and asked her out on several occasions. He received no encouragement and eventually gave up. When Demler was travelling in the UK, Thomas sent her letters and gifts. He was politely rebuffed.

Arthur moved to a new job, working for a crop-dusting company. This involved travel in the area and, after Demler returned to New Zealand and was teaching in the Manawatū District, the two would occasionally run into each other. Their interactions were casual and friendly.

In 1966, Arthur's father offered him the lease on the family farm. Arthur, now married to Vivien (née Carter), moved to the farm. By coincidence, Jeannette Demler had married Harvey Crewe that year.

== The Crewe murders ==
On 22 June 1970, police received a report that Harvey and Jeannette Crew had disappeared, that their baby had been left in the home for days, and that there was a significant amount of blood in their house. Two months later, Jeannette's body was found in the Waikato River; a month later, Harvey Crewe's body was found downstream. Both had died by being shot in the head with a .22 calibre rifle.

Initially, the police suspected Jeannette's father, Len Demler, who had no alibi, and who behaved strangely from the outset. Following the search for the weapon, and after being told that Arthur Thomas had "pestered" Jeannette, the investigation's focus shifted to Thomas.

== Evidence against Thomas ==
Arthur Thomas owned a .22 calibre rifle. While there was no definitive proof that his gun was used in the murders, a detective said: "Arthur, it was your rifle that was used to kill the Crewes. What do you say to that?" Arthur replied, "If you say it was my gun, it must have been, but I didn't do it."

When Harvey Crewe's body was dumped in the river, the front axle from a vehicle was used to weigh down the body. Police traced the part to a custom-built trailer sold in 1959 to Arthur's father Allan Thomas. On October 11th, police found wire at the Thomas farm which matched the wire used to attach the axle to Harvey's body. On October 15th, Detective Len Johnston searched the garbage dumps on the Thomas farm for the rear axles to match the front axle found with Harvey Crewe's body. Arthur Thomas helped in the search. The trailer was not on the property, and no axles were found. On October 20th, Johnston returned to search again. This time, he found both rear axles.

On October 25th, Detective Inspector Hutton called Arthur Thomas into the police station to make a statement. Thomas re-stated the particulars of his alibi, which were that, on the night of the murders, he was at his farm with his wife and cousin, and that the three were dealing with a sick cow. He eventually had to shoot the cow, and used his .22 calibre rifle. He stated that he did not know what had happened to his father's old trailer, and he did not know how the axles and wire came to be found on his farm. In his statement, Thomas indicates that he was told that a pair of overalls which he kept in his car had blood on them, however this 'discovery' was never mentioned again.

On October 26th, Hutton ordered a search around the Crewe's kitchen window. The next morning, two detectives uncovered a .22 cartridge casing at a depth of 2-3 inches in the soil near the back door of the house. The casing bore marks which showed that it had been ejected from Thomas's rifle. On November 11th, Hutton and Johnston arrested Arthur Thomas.

== Trials ==
Arthur Thomas's trial began on February 9, 1971. All of the evidence was presented. What was missing was a motive; the prosecution pointed to Arthur's admitted crush on Jeannette, and the gifts he sent to her, and said that his motive was romantic obsession. Len Demler testified for the prosecution. Arthur's wife and cousin both testified and were adamant that, on the night of the murders, Arthur was at home. On March 2nd, after two hours of deliberation, the jury found Arthur Thomas guilty. He was sentenced to life in prison.

Arthur was taken to Paremoremo Prison on the outskirts of Auckland. 'Pare', as it was called, was New Zealand's only maximum security prison. When it was built in 1968, it was hailed as the world's most technologically-advanced prison. It was designed to allow its 600 inmates a degree of freedom, but it was known as a harsh place.

With Arthur in prison, Vivian Thomas campaigned for a new trial, and his legal team petitioned the Court of Appeal, which declined to order a new trial. While referencing the shell casing found in the Crewe's garden, the court said that the defence would have to prove that the bullets that killed the Crewes did not come from Arthur's gun.

In 1971, Vivian's uncle, Pat Veasey, founded the Arthur Thomas Retrial Committee. By this time, The New Zealand Herald division Wilson and Horton had published an entire magazine about the case. Vivian noted: "Anyone studying the story and pictures... must see the incredibly flimsy evidence with which my husband lost his freedom. This magazine has turned the people of New Zealand into a jury."

The Retrial Committee circulated petitions asking Prime Minister Keith Holyoake for a retrial. The petition bore 22,500 signatures, including 150 from Arthur's fellow inmates. Holyoake passed the petition to Governor-General Arthur Porritt, who ordered 82 year-old Supreme Court Justice George McGregor to review the case. On 17 February 1972, McGregor returned the opinion that there had been no miscarriage of justice.

In June of 1972, at the request of the Arthur Thomas Retrial Committee, the New Zealand government sent the shell casing found in the Crewe garden, and Arthur's gun, to England for testing. While the English experts could not prove or disprove that the casing came from Arthur's gun, they did note that, after four months in the soil, the casing should have been corroded. It was not. In August 1972, the Court of Appeal considered this new evidence and ordered a second trial.

The retrial of Arthur Allan Thomas began on 26 March 1973. This time, the focus of the defence was on proving that the bullet casing found in the Crewe garden did not come from Arthur's rifle.

The bullets used to kill the Crewes were Number Eight bullets, manufactured by Imperial Chemical Industries, or ICI, and not made since 1962. Dr. Jim Sprott, a scientist working on behalf of the defence, testified that when he examined the 'number eight' bullet and the cartridge alleged to be shot from Arthur's rifle, he saw that the ICI logo on the bottom of the bullets was slightly different than that on the casing--the 'C' in the logo on the bullets was smaller.

Dr. Sprott put out a public call for Number Eight bullets; he received 22,000 bullets. In all cases, the 'C' on the bullets was smaller than that on the casing from the Crewe's garden, meaning that the cartridge case found in the garden could not have come from the bullets that killed Jeannette and Harvey Crewe. ICI Australia agreed. But ICI New Zealand, testifying for the Crown, said that the bullet could have come from that casing.

On 20 April 1973, the jury returned a verdict of guilty. Again, Arthur Allan Thomas was sentenced to life in prison. The New Zealand Herald wrote of the chaos that ensued: "Screams, tears and angry protests threw the Supreme Court at Auckland into an uproar."

Arthur went back to Pare. Five weeks later, the Court of Appeal rejected his case again.

In 1975, Vivian Thomas divorced Arthur. The stress of the situation had led her to struggle with substance abuse and, since 1974, she had been having an affair. Arthur learned of his divorce on the radio.

== Allegations of corruption ==
Covering the Arthur Thomas case for the Auckland Star was journalist Pat Booth who, in 1975, published his reporting, and allegations of police and prosecutorial corruption, in the award-winning book The Fate of Arthur Thomas: Trial By Ambush.

Booth provided evidence that, months before Thomas's second trial, Detective Inspector Hutton and Crown prosecutors investigated the potential jury pool to find jurors with pro-police attitudes. They also made sure that, when the jury was sequestered, they were housed at The Station Hotel, which was where Auckland's police socialised.

Journalist Terry Bell, who would write a book about the case, found evidence that, at the hotel, food and drink were free to the jurors and the police accompanying them, and that there were parties attended by police and jurors. Bell included this in an article he wrote for Rolling Stone New Zealand, titled The Crucification of Arthur Allan Thomas. Before the magazine was released, and without a warrant, police confiscated the entire edition of the magazine.

It was also discovered that Bob Rock, the jury foreman at Thomas's second trial, was an old friend of Detective Sergeant Hughes, who gave evidence at the trial and who was the officer who first interviewed Thomas and took the statement about his alibi.

There was also the allegation that both the bullet casing and the rear axles were planted in order to frame Arthur. This suspicion deepened when it was discovered that, in July of 1973, Hutton ordered the disposal of 135 exhibits of evidence pertaining to the case.

== Pardon and Inquiry ==
By 1975, the story had attracted significant international attention. The British writer David Yallop wrote the 1978 book Beyond Reasonable Doubt? which, in 1980, was made into a film.

Report of the Royal Commission to Inquire into the Circumstances of the Convictions of Arthur Allan Thomas for the Murders of David Harvey Crewe and Jeanette Lenore Crewe; 1980

Booth and Yallop wrote to Prime Minister Robert Muldoon to appeal for a Royal Pardon for Arthur, with Booth including a dossier of evidence of police corruption. Muldoon ordered an inquiry into all aspects of the case. In December 1979, the counsel leading the inquiry reported to Muldoon that it was doubtful that the charges were proved beyond a reasonable doubt. On 18 December 1979, after serving nine years in prison, Arthur Allan Thomas was released from prison and returned to his farm. He received NZ$950,000 in compensation.

A Royal Commission of Inquiry was ordered to review the wrongful conviction of Thomas. The hearings, headed by retired New South Wales Justice Robert Taylor, were contentious, marked by angry exchanges between the judge and police lawyers and witnesses. Chris Birt, author of All the Commissioner's Men reported that police leaked evidence from the commission's closed sessions to the media and sought an injunction in the High Court of New Zealand to try to halt the commission's proceedings.

The commission delivered its report to the Governor-General in November 1980. It "rejected entirely the notion that any of the evidence put forward... established a motive by Arthur Allan Thomas to kill the Crewes". The fact that the jury foreman and one of the detectives were friends was, on its own, sufficient to justify describing the second trial a miscarriage of justice. The commission found that the spent cartridge case from Thomas's gun, Exhibit 350, had not been left by the murderer, but had been created by police using his impounded gun and ammunition, then planted at the Crewe farmhouse. The Royal Commission said: "We consider that this explains why Mr. Hutton described shellcase 350 as containing blue-black corrosion when in fact it did not." The Commission's report implicated Detective Inspector Bruce Hutton and Detective Sergeant Lenrick Johnston in police misconduct, and found that the prosecution of Thomas for the murders had been unjustified.

Despite the commission's description of Hutton and Johnston's conduct as an "unspeakable outrage", Solicitor-General Paul Neazor recommended against prosecuting them, as a number of police officers disputed the claims that the cartridge had been planted, and it would be too difficult to prove the case against the detectives. Johnston died in 1978. Hutton died in 2013. To the end of his life, Hutton denied planting evidence and insisted that he had arrested the right person. At his funeral, Deputy Commissioner Mike Bush delivered Hutton's eulogy and stated that "his integrity is beyond reproach." This comment was received with a public outcry and Arthur Thomas requested a retraction and an apology. Police Commissioner Peter Marshall defended the eulogy.

== Police review ==
In 2010, Rochelle Crewe asked police to reopen the investigation in a bid to find out who killed her parents. This was refused but a review was later determined to be necessary. In 2013, in the process of their review, the police interviewed Arthur Thomas, two of his brothers, his sister and her husband. In the course of these interviews, the police told Thomas' sister, Margaret Stuckey, that "The Thomas rifle had not been eliminated from the inquiry, that the Crewes were murdered by Arthur Thomas' gun." Mr Stuckey said: "They said to us more than once that the bulk of the evidence still pointed towards Arthur."

In 2014, the 328-page review was released. It stated that evidence available in the murder of the Crewes was insufficient for any new prosecution. The review acknowledged that a key prosecution exhibit in the trials had been fabricated by detectives, but stated that there was no mystery woman on the property and that the baby had not been fed after the murders. The review ruled out Len Demler as having been the killer. While commenting on the review, Arthur Thomas's brother Des stated that he knew the identity of the killer. The police review cleared all other suspects and implied that Arthur Thomas remained a suspect.

== Subsequent events ==
In 2009 Arthur Allan Thomas travelled to Christchurch to support David Bain, who also had criminal convictions against him overturned. In 2010 he collaborated with investigative journalist Ian Wishart on the book Arthur Allan Thomas. Wishhart suggested that Sergeant Johnston may have been responsible for the murders.

In 2012, Keith Hunter published The Case of the Missing Bloodstain in which he pointed the finger at Jeannette Crewe's father, Lenard Demler - who the police initially suspected - for the murders. Demler's wife died four months before the murders which occurred on 17 June 1970. This was one day after Jeannette Crewe signed the document which made her trustee for her mother's will. According to Chris Birt, this meant half of Demler's farm and $12,000 of shares he had paid for were now controlled by Jeanette Crewe. Demler died in 1992 and so the police were unable to interview him again when they conducted their review in 2014.

In late 2019 Thomas, then aged 81, faced one charge of rape and four of indecent assault against two women. The alleged offending occurred many years earlier. Thomas pleaded not guilty and elected trial by jury. The Defence claimed the charges were fabricated and motivated by money. The jury failed to reach a verdict and was discharged on 28 June 2021.

On 14 October 2021 Crown Prosecutor Charlie Piho told the Manukau District Court the Crown wished to continue with the prosecution. However, in September 2022, an indefinite stay of prosecution was granted in response to Thomas now being considered unfit to stand trial due to deteriorating mental health. In effect, this ended the prosecution.

== Reputational damage to the justice system ==
In 2012, Keith Hunter said the royal commission finding that the police force framed Arthur Allan Thomas introduced a deep disillusionment, and undermined confidence in police. He said that suspicion of the justice system now existed in the cases of Peter Ellis, Scott Watson, Mark Lundy, John Barlow, Rex Haig, David Tamihere and others.

In 2015 an honours degree thesis analysed the role of the police, the judges and the jury in the Thomas case and determined that "the conduct of actors within the courts inhibited the fair administration justice and as a result, exposed themselves to profound derision." The author noted that:

- the police and the prosecution employed unfair tactics, attempted to fabricate evidence about exhibit 350 and were solely interested in the preservation of their reputations which had been undermined by the extensive litigation;
- that the judiciary was devoted to defending and maintaining the guilty verdict which "rendered the appeals process virtually useless."
- and that evidence showed the jury was also affected by the undeclared relationship between the jury foreman and a Crown witness, and the development of favourable crown-jury relations during the second trial. As a result, the jury was far from impartial.

The thesis concluded that the Arthur Allan Thomas case saw public trust in New Zealand's criminal justice system diminish dramatically and that, had it not been for the intervention of Robert Muldoon, Thomas would not have been freed.

== Books ==
- The Crewe Murders by Evan Swain, Wilson and Horton 1971
- Bitter Hill: Arthur Thomas, The Case for a Retrial by Terry Bell, Auckland Avant-Garde Publishing 1972
- The Fate of Arthur Thomas: Trial By Ambush by Pat Booth, South Pacific Press 1975
- Quash the Verdicts – The Thomas Affair by Earl Bailey, Hawkes Bay Arthur Thomas Committee 1976
- ABC of Injustice: The Thomas Case by Jim Sprott with Pat Booth, Arthur Thomas Retrial Committee 1976
- Beyond Reasonable Doubt? by David Yallop, Hodder & Stoughton 1979
- The Final Chapter: If Arthur Allan Thomas Didn't Kill Jeanette and Harvey Crewe – Who Did? by Chris Birt, Penguin Books 2001
- Arthur Allan Thomas: The Inside Story: Crewe Murders: New Evidence by Ian Wishart and Arthur Allan Thomas, Howling at the Moon Publishing 2010
- The Case of the Missing Bloodstain by Keith Hunter, Hunter Productions 2011
- All The Commissioner's Men by Chris Birt, Stentorian Publishing 2012
- The Crewe Murders: Inside New Zealand's Most Infamous Cold Case by Kirsty Johnston and James Hollings, Massey University Press 2023

== See also ==
- Beyond Reasonable Doubt, a 1980 film about the conviction of Thomas
- Crime in New Zealand
