= Lucas Lee (disambiguation) =

Luke "Lucas" Lee is a fictional character in the comic book series, film, and animated series Scott Pilgrim

Lucas/Luke Lee may also refer to:

- Lucas Lee (golfer), Brazilian golfer
- Luke Pyungse Lee, American bioengineer
- Luas Lee Wen Loong "Luke Lee", a Singaporean actor and lawyer
- Luke (Yong Bum) Lee, defendant in the case of Death of Joanna Lee
