= Murder of Harvey and Jeannette Crewe =

1970 crimes in New Zealand

Harvey and Jeannette Crewe
- Harvey and Jeannette Crewe, pictured at their 1966 wedding
- Born: David Harvey Crewe; 20 October 1941; Jeannette Lenore Demler; 6 February 1940
- Died: Pukekawa, Lower Waikato, New Zealand
- Cause of death: .22 calibre gunshot wounds
- Body discovered: 16 August 1970 (Jeannette); 16 September 1970 (Harvey)
- Occupation: Farmers
- Known for: Victims of unsolved murder

David Harvey Crewe (20 October 1941 – c. 17 June 1970) and Jeannette Lenore Crewe (née Demler; 6 February 1940 – c. 17 June 1970) were a New Zealand farming couple who were shot to death in their home on or shortly after 17 June 1970. The killings led to an unsafe murder conviction and subsequent pardoning of another farmer who lived in the district, Arthur Allan Thomas. A Royal Commission to investigate the conviction found that, in a miscarriage of justice, police had fabricated evidence and placed it at the crime scene to convict Thomas. As of 2026 the murders remain unsolved.

== Background ==
Jeannette Lenore Demler was born in 1940 to farmer Lenard Demler and May Constance (née Chennells), known as Maisie. A second daughter, Heather, was born two years later. Earlier, in 1937, Len Demler had taken control of a farm in Pukekawa, a small affluent town on New Zealand's North Island. Maisie was the daughter of the family that owned the farm next door. Next to that farm was another owned by Maisie's brother, Howard Chennells. In 1950, Howard was killed in a tractor accident. In his will, he left his farm to Jeannette and Heather, then aged 10 and 8. He instructed that the farm should be managed by others until the girls were 25, with profits placed in a trust for them.

Jeannette was attending Pukekawa School when, in 1951, she met Arthur Allan Thomas. Thomas was a local boy, born in 1938 and one of nine children of Allan and Ivy Thomas. The following year, Allan Thomas withdrew his son from school to work on their farm. Thomas later confirmed that he had a crush on Jeannette and asked her out on several occasions, but received no encouragement and eventually gave up.

In 1958, Jeannette graduated from Auckland's Ardmore Teachers College; by 1960, she was working at Mangatangi School, and living in the village of Maramarua, where she would occasionally run into her former schoolmate Thomas. Their interactions were cordial and brief.

In 1961, Jeannette left New Zealand for her "Big O.E.", a rite of passage for many New Zealanders, where they travel for an extended period of time. Jeannette's father gave Arthur her address in London, and Arthur sent her a letter and a gift of beads and stockings. Jeannette thanked him politely. In 1962, he sent her a brush and comb set. This time, she replied that she had a boyfriend.

In 1963, Jeannette returned to New Zealand and settled in the Manawatū District, where she met Harvey Crewe, a farmer from a farming family. Jeannette was now old enough to take over the farm she had inherited. Harvey bought out her sister's share. The two married in the Auckland suburb of Epsom on 18 June 1966. That same day, they moved into their farm, next to that of her parents.

Of the Crewes' relationship, a friend said: "They had a real appreciation of each other... A well-suited, wonderfully happy, strong and mature couple, completely capable of working out life in a harmonious, positive manner. Both intelligent, witty, fun to be with if they knew you well, otherwise reserved... [they] could be described as a very private couple."

By coincidence, Arthur Thomas returned to Pukekawa that same month, having married Vivien (née Carter), a typist from Farnham, England, two years previously. He had been working for a crop-dusting company but had accepted his father's offer to lease the family farm, which was 15km from the Crewe farm. In July 1967, the Crewe home was burgled. Rather than take valuables, the thief took inexpensive items, including a brush and comb set.

In December 1968, Jeannette gave birth to a daughter, Rochelle. While she was in hospital, Harvey returned home to find their house ablaze. Clothing had been set on fire in the bedroom, and much of the house was lost; how the fire started was never ascertained. On 28 May 1969, there was a second unexplained fire; this time, the Crewes lost their barn and 800 bales of hay.

In 1962, Len Demler had been found guilty of tax evasion and fined £9540. To pay the fine, he sold half of his farm to Maisie. On 26 February 1970, Maisie died of a brain tumour. In her will, she excluded her daughter, Heather, leaving Jeannette Crewe with 75% of the Demler farm. In return, Len Demler changed his will, leaving Heather his remaining 25% share. The situation had caused tension in the family and, on 16 June 1970, the Crewes went to dinner at Demler's home. Jeannette had also inherited her mother's car, a Morris 1100, which she said she intended to sell to pay inheritance tax. The dinner was an acrimonious occasion.

== Disappearance and discovery ==
On 17 June, the day after the dinner, the Crewes attended the local cattle stock sale. Harvey bought a bull, and the couple was seen leaving the sale at approximately 3:00 p.m. At 4:45 p.m., two farmers saw the Crewe car about 7km from the farmhouse and saw a man, whom they assumed was Harvey Crewe, off in the distance herding sheep. At 7:00 p.m., the stock agent called Harvey to arrange delivery of the bull; no one answered the phone.

On 22 June, the stock agent called again, then went to the farm. When no one answered the door, he called Demler. A driver for a company scheduled to pick up sheep from the Crewe farm arrived at 12:35 and received no answer. He also called Demler, who finally went to the farm. In the back door, Demler found the key in the lock. He went in and found blood on the kitchen floor and in the living room. He finally looked in the baby's room, where he found Rochelle in a "distressed condition" and unable to stand. He left her there, went home and called the truck driver to cancel the sheep pick-up. He then went to the home of a neighbour, Owen Priest, and asked him to go to the Crewe farm with him, without mentioning the blood or the baby.

At the farm, Demler stayed at the back door, leaving Priest to search the house alone. After searching the barn, Demler retrieved Rochelle and took her to a friend's home. Priest then went to his own home and called the police.

An investigation team, led by Detective Inspector Bruce Hutton, arrived at 5:00 p.m. The house was searched, fingerprinted, sampled and photographed. In the living room, brain tissue was found on Harvey's armchair, and a bloody smear indicated that a body had been dragged from the living room. In the kitchen, blood was found on the floor, and watered-down blood was found on the cupboards.

The following day, Hutton heard from the doctor who examined Rochelle. Her skin tone indicated that she had lost 1-2 lbs., but the doctor concluded that someone had fed her 48 hours before she was discovered, or about three days after the death of her parents. A witness said that, on June 19th, he saw a fair-haired woman in a green Hillman car on the Crewe property. That woman has never been identified.

On the morning of August 16, 1970, two men were fishing downstream of the Tuakau Bridge, on New Zealand's longest river, the Waikato. There, they found Jeannette's partially-submerged body, wrapped in a bedspread and curtain fabric, which were secured with copper wire.

On September 16, 1970, 5km downstream from the bridge, police found Harvey's body. A vehicle axle had apparently weighed it down.

In both cases, Demler identified the remains. Both victims had been shot in the head with a .22 calibre rifle, with Jeannette sustaining the additional pre-mortem injury of a broken nose from being struck across the face with a blunt object. Her body was fully clothed, and there was no evidence of sexual assault.

== Investigation ==
Given Demler's odd behaviour—leaving the baby behind, not participating in the search with Priest or with police, his reputation as an ill-tempered drinker, and his defensive attitude when questioned about his whereabouts on the relevant dates, he became the first suspect. His home was searched, and he was formally questioned. During that interview, Hutton told him, "I think you are the person who removed Harvey Crewe's body from the Crewe household. In fact, I'm quite certain you've done this." However, Demler had no apparent motive—he'd already bequeathed his share of the farm to his daughter Heather and, with Rochelle alive, could not inherit Jeannette's share. He did have a scratch on his neck, but there was no physical evidence linking him to the murders.

While police collected .22 calibre rifles from properties within an 8km radius of the Crewe farm, Jeannette's sister Heather, who was living in the USA, returned to take custody of Rochelle. Police had been told that Jeannette had previously been "pestered" by a local boy, and Heather told them it was Arthur Thomas.

On July 2nd, Detective John Hughes visited Arthur Thomas. Thomas was forthcoming about his previous contact with Jeannette and said he had been to the Crewe farm three years earlier to spread manure. He said he had not seen the Crewes for nine months and that on the night of 17 June, he was at home. Hughes discovered that Thomas also owned a green Hillman car. The witness who had seen a similar car at the Crewe farm was positive that the woman driving it was not Vivien Thomas. There was no blood or evidence of bodies being transported in the vehicle. Hughes found that Thomas owned a .22 calibre rifle and seized it for testing.

The search of the Crewe farm continued, with police looking for lengths of copper wire and cartridge cases. None were found. What did turn up was the brush set that Thomas had sent Jeannette years earlier, meaning that the set stolen during the 1967 burglary was not the Thomas gift.

Police test-fired the 48 .22 calibre rifles collected. Two could not be excluded as the murder weapon; one belonging to the Eyre family and one belonging to Arthur Thomas. The bullets in the victims' bodies were found to be stamped with the number 8, as were bullets found in Thomas's possession. On September 7th, the day of Jeannette's funeral, police brought Thomas in for questioning. While there was no proof that Thomas's gun was used in the murders, a detective said, "Arthur, it was your rifle that was used to kill the Crewes. What do you say to that?" Thomas replied, "If you say it was my gun, it must have been, but I didn't do it."

On September 19th, police determined that the axle used to weigh down Harvey's body was the front axle of a 1928 Nash Standard Six 420 sedan. They were able to trace the part to a custom-built trailer sold in 1959 to Arthur's father, Allan Thomas. On October 11th, police found wire at the Thomas farm that matched the wire used to attach the axle to Harvey's body. On October 15th, Detective Len Johnston searched the garbage dumps on the Thomas farm for the rear axles to match the front axle found with Harvey Crewe's body. Arthur Thomas helped in the search. The trailer was not on the property, and no axles were found. On October 20th, Johnston returned to search again. This time, he found both rear axles.

Detective Johnston developed the official police theory of the case. He noted that the Crewe's kitchen had a louvred window which, on the night of the murders, was open. The kitchen led directly into the living room. Johnston posited that as Harvey was sitting in his armchair, the killer shot through the kitchen window and that the bullet hit him in the back of the head, killing him instantly. As the assailant entered the house, Jeannette, who was knitting on the sofa, would have jumped up and faced the killer. Johnston said that the killer struck her in the face, knocking her to the ground, and then shot her in the back of the head. Johnston's theory was that the killer removed the bodies through the front door; no explanation was offered for the blood in the kitchen or why the key to the house was in the lock.

On October 25th, Hutton called Arthur Thomas into the police station to make a statement. Thomas re-stated the particulars of his alibi, which were that, on the night of the murders, he was at his farm with his wife and cousin, and that the three were dealing with a sick cow. He eventually had to shoot the cow, and used his .22 calibre rifle. He stated that he did not know what had happened to his father's old trailer, nor how the axles and wire came to be found on his farm. In his statement, Thomas revealed that he was told that a pair of overalls, which he kept in his car, had blood on them; this "discovery" was never mentioned again.

On October 26th, Hutton ordered a search around the Crewe's kitchen window. The next morning, two detectives uncovered a .22 cartridge casing at a depth of 2-3 inches in the soil near the back door of the house. The casing bore marks which showed that it had been ejected from Thomas's rifle. On November 11th, Hutton and Johnston arrested Arthur Thomas.

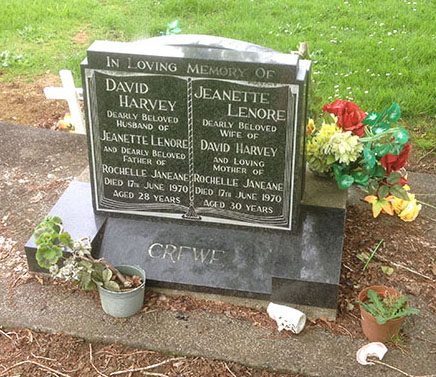
A 2013 photograph of the grave of Harvey and Jeannette Crewe, Tuakau Cemetery, Waikato, New Zealand. Jeannette's name is misspelled.

== Trials ==
Arthur Thomas's trial began on February 9, 1971. What was missing was a motive; the prosecution pointed to Arthur's admitted crush on Jeannette and the gifts he sent her, and said his motive was romantic obsession. Demler testified for the prosecution. Arthur's wife and cousin both testified and were adamant that, on the night of the murders, Arthur was at home. On March 2nd, after deliberating for two hours, the jury found Arthur Thomas guilty. He was sentenced to life in prison.

Arthur was taken to Paremoremo (now Auckland) Prison on the outskirts of Auckland. Paremoremo was (and still is) New Zealand's only maximum-security men's prison. When it was built in 1968, it was hailed as the world's most technologically advanced prison. It was designed to allow its 600 inmates a degree of freedom, but it was known as a harsh place.

With Arthur in prison, Vivien campaigned for a new trial, and his legal team petitioned the Court of Appeal, which declined to grant one. While referencing the shell casing found in the Crewe garden, the court said that the defence would have to prove that the bullets that killed the Crewes did not come from Arthur's gun.

In 1971, Vivien Thomas's uncle, Pat Vesey, founded the Arthur Thomas Retrial Committee. By this time, The New Zealand Herald division Wilson and Horton had published an entire magazine about the case. Vivien noted: "Anyone studying the story and pictures... must see the incredibly flimsy evidence with which my husband lost his freedom. This magazine has turned the people of New Zealand into a jury."

The Retrial Committee circulated petitions asking Prime Minister Keith Holyoake for a retrial. The petition bore 22,500 signatures, including 150 from Arthur's fellow inmates. Holyoake passed the petition to Governor-General Arthur Porritt, who ordered 82-year-old retired Supreme Court Justice George McGregor to review the case. On February 17, 1972, McGregor returned the opinion that there had been no miscarriage of justice.

In June of 1972, at the request of the Arthur Thomas Retrial Committee, the New Zealand government sent the gun and the shell casing to England for advanced testing. While the English experts could not prove or disprove that the casing came from Arthur's gun, they did note that, after four months in the soil, the casing should have been corroded. It was not. In August 1972, the Court of Appeal considered this new evidence and ordered a second trial.

The retrial of Arthur Allan Thomas began on the 26th of March 1973. This time, the focus of the defence was on proving that the bullet casing found in the Crewe garden did not come from Arthur's rifle.

The bullets used to kill the Crewes were "No. 8 pattern" bullets, manufactured by Imperial Chemicals Company (ICI), and not made since 1962. Jim Sprott, a scientist working on behalf of the defence, testified that when he examined these bullets and the casing from the garden, he saw that the ICI logo on the bottom of the bullets was slightly different from that on the casing—the 'C' in the logo on the bullets was smaller.

Dr Sprott put out a public call for No. 8 pattern bullets; he received 22,000. In all cases, the 'C' on the bullets was smaller than that on the casing from the Crewe garden, implying that the casing found in the garden could not have housed the bullets that killed Jeannette and Harvey Crewe. ICI Australia agreed. But ICI New Zealand, testifying for the Crown, said that the bullets could have come from that casing.

On April 20th 1973, the jury returned a verdict of guilty. Again, Arthur Allan Thomas was sentenced to life in prison. The New Zealand Herald wrote of the chaos that ensued: "Screams, tears and angry protests threw the Supreme Court at Auckland into an uproar."

Arthur went back to Paremoremo Prison. Five weeks later, the Court of Appeal rejected his case again.

In 1975, Vivien divorced Arthur. The stress of the situation had led her to struggle with substance abuse, and since 1974, she had been having an affair. Arthur learned of his divorce from a radio report.

== Allegations of corruption ==
Covering the Arthur Thomas case for the Auckland Star was journalist Pat Booth who, in 1975, published his reporting and allegations of police and prosecutorial corruption in the award-winning book The Fate of Arthur Thomas: Trial By Ambush.

Booth provided evidence that, months before Thomas's second trial, Detective Inspector Hutton and Crown prosecutors investigated the potential jury pool to find jurors with pro-police sentiments. They also made sure that, when the jury was sequestered, they were housed at The Station Hotel, which was where Auckland's police socialised.

Journalist Terry Bell, who would write a book about the case, found evidence that, at the hotel, food and drink were free to the jurors and the police accompanying them, and that police and jurors attended parties. Bell included this in an article he wrote for Rolling Stone New Zealand, titled The Crucification of Arthur Allan Thomas. Before the magazine was released, police confiscated the entire edition without a warrant.

It was also discovered that Bob Rock, the jury foreman at Thomas's second trial, was an old friend of Detective Sergeant Hughes, who gave evidence at the trial and who was the officer who first interviewed Thomas and took the statement about his alibi.

There was also the allegation that both the bullet casing and the rear axles were planted to frame Arthur. This suspicion deepened when it was discovered that, in July of 1973, Hutton ordered the disposal of 135 exhibits of evidence about the case.

== Pardon and Inquiry ==
By 1975, the story had attracted significant international attention. The British writer David Yallop wrote the 1978 book Beyond Reasonable Doubt? which, in 1980, was made into a film.

Report of the Royal Commission to Inquire into the Circumstances of the Convictions of Arthur Allan Thomas for the Murders of David Harvey Crewe and Jeanette Lenore Crewe; 1980. Like her headstone, Jeannette's name is misspelled throughout the document.

Booth and Yallop wrote to Prime Minister Robert Muldoon to appeal for a Royal Pardon for Arthur, with Booth including a dossier of evidence of police corruption. Muldoon ordered an inquiry into all aspects of the case. In December 1979, the counsel leading the inquiry reported to Muldoon that it was doubtful that the charges had been proved beyond a reasonable doubt. On December 18, 1979, after serving nine years in prison, Arthur Allan Thomas was released from prison and returned to his farm. He received NZ$950,000 in compensation.

A Royal Commission of Inquiry was ordered to review the conviction. The hearings, headed by retired New South Wales Justice Robert Taylor, were contentious, marked by angry exchanges between the judge and police lawyers and witnesses. Chris Birt, author of All the Commissioner's Men reported that police leaked evidence from the commission's closed sessions to the media and sought an injunction in the High Court of New Zealand to try to halt the commission's proceedings.

Justice Taylor delivered the commission's report to the Governor-General in November 1980. It "rejected entirely the notion that any of the evidence put forward... established a motive by Arthur Allan Thomas to kill the Crewes". The fact that the jury foreman and one of the detectives were friends was, on its own, sufficient to justify describing the second trial a miscarriage of justice. The commission found that the spent cartridge casing had not been left by the murderer, but had been created by police using his impounded gun and ammunition, then planted at the Crewe farmhouse. The Royal Commission said: "We consider that this explains why Mr. Hutton described shellcase 350 as containing blue-black corrosion when in fact it did not." The Commission's report implicated Detective Inspector Bruce Hutton and Detective Sergeant Lenrick Johnston in police misconduct, and found that the prosecution of Thomas for the murders had been unjustified.

Despite the commission's description of Hutton and Johnston's conduct as an "unspeakable outrage", Solicitor-General Paul Neazor recommended against prosecuting them, as several police officers disputed the claim that the cartridge had been planted and argued that proving the case against the detectives would be too difficult. Johnston died in 1978. Hutton died in 2013. To the end of his life, Hutton denied planting evidence and insisted that he had arrested the right person. At his funeral, Deputy Commissioner Mike Bush delivered Hutton's eulogy and stated that "his integrity is beyond reproach." This comment elicited a public outcry and Arthur Thomas requested a retraction and an apology. Police Commissioner Peter Marshall defended the eulogy.

== Police review ==
In 2010, Rochelle Crewe asked police to reopen the investigation in a bid to find out who killed her parents. The request was refused, but a review was later determined to be necessary. In 2013, during their review, the police interviewed Arthur Thomas, two of his brothers, his sister, and her husband. In the course of these interviews, the police told Thomas's sister, Margaret Stuckey, that "The Thomas rifle had not been eliminated from the inquiry, that the Crewes were murdered by Arthur Thomas's gun." Mr Stuckey said: "They said to us more than once that the bulk of the evidence still pointed towards Arthur."

In 2014, the 328-page review was released. It stated that the evidence available in the homicide of the Crewes was insufficient for any new prosecution. The review acknowledged that detectives had fabricated a key prosecution exhibit in the trials. It stated that there was no mystery woman on the property and that the baby had not been fed after the murders. The review ruled out Len Demler as having been the killer. While commenting on the review, Arthur Thomas's brother Des stated that he knew the identity of the killer. The police review cleared all other suspects and implied that Arthur Thomas remained a suspect.

== Status ==
Rochelle Crewe's name was changed. She was raised by her aunt Heather in New Zealand and the United States.

Vivien Thomas remarried. In 2010, haunted by the allegation that she was the mystery woman on the farm, she wrote to the New Zealand Justice Minister, asking that the case be reopened so she could clear her name. She died of cancer in 2011.

After his release, Arthur Thomas bought a new farm. A young woman contacted him; the two began corresponding and married in 1981. In 1982, they had a daughter.

In 2019, Thomas was charged with historical sexual offending following allegations by two women of rape and indecent assault. In 2021, at age 83, he was tried at Manukau District Court. His lawyer stated that the allegations were untrue and motivated by "a bitter dispute over money". The jury failed to reach a verdict. In 2022, the Crown declined to re-try Thomas, citing his deteriorating mental health and inability to stand trial.

As of 2025, the case of the Crewe murders remains unsolved.

== Books ==
- The Crewe Murders by Evan Swain, Wilson and Horton 1971
- Bitter Hill: Arthur Thomas, The Case for a Retrial by Terry Bell, Auckland Avant-Garde Publishing 1972
- The Fate of Arthur Thomas: Trial By Ambush by Pat Booth, South Pacific Press 1975
- Quash the Verdicts – The Thomas Affair by Earl Bailey, Hawkes Bay Arthur Thomas Committee 1976
- ABC of Injustice: The Thomas Case by Jim Sprott with Pat Booth, Arthur Thomas Retrial Committee 1976
- Beyond Reasonable Doubt? by David Yallop, Hodder & Stoughton 1979
- The Final Chapter: If Arthur Allan Thomas Didn't Kill Jeanette and Harvey Crewe – Who Did? by Chris Birt, Penguin Books 2001
- Arthur Allan Thomas: The Inside Story: Crewe Murders: New Evidence by Ian Wishart and Arthur Allan Thomas, Howling at the Moon Publishing 2010
- The Case of the Missing Bloodstain by Keith Hunter, Hunter Productions 2011
- All The Commissioner's Men by Chris Birt, Stentorian Publishing 2012
- The Crewe Murders: Inside New Zealand's Most Infamous Cold Case by Kirsty Johnston and James Hollings, Massey University Press 2023

== See also ==
- Crime in New Zealand
- Killing of Scott Guy
- List of solved missing person cases (1970s)
- List of unsolved murders (1900–1979)
- Pukekawa § The Eyre Murder
