= Greg King (lawyer) =

New Zealand lawyer (1969–2012)

- Born: 17 September 1969; Whanganui, New Zealand
- Died: 3 November 2012 (aged 43); Newlands, Wellington, New Zealand
- Education: University of Otago
- Occupations: Criminal defence lawyer, broadcaster
- Spouse: Catherine Milnes
- Children: 2

Gregory James King (17 September 1969 – 3 November 2012) was a New Zealand criminal defence lawyer and broadcaster. He was described as "one of this country's finest legal brains".

== Early life and education ==
Of Ngāti Tūwharetoa descent, King was born in Whanganui and grew up in Tūrangi, where his father was a prison officer. He was head prefect at Tongariro High School in 1987. The following year, he represented New Zealand as one of 32 pavilion hosts in the World Expo in Brisbane, Australia. King studied law at the University of Otago, graduating (LLB) in 1992. He was admitted to the bar on 14 May 1993 at Dunedin High Court.

== Legal career ==
In 1996, King became the "youngest New Zealand lawyer to appear as lead in a murder trial and over the rest of his career he represented over 50 clients who were charged with murder." In 2003, in conjunction with trial lawyer Mike Antunovic, King unsuccessfully took the Scott Watson case to the Privy Council in London seeking leave to appeal his convictions for double murder. He successfully appealed to the Privy Council in 2005 in representing the double murderer Bruce Howse; and his application to the Privy Council in 2008 and 2009 for leave to reopen the case of John Barlow, convicted of the murders of Gene and Eugene Thomas, was similarly successful. In 2009 King assisted Judith Ablett-Kerr in the defence of Clayton Weatherston for the murder of Sophie Elliott. In 2012, King successfully defended Ewen MacDonald on the charge of murdering his brother-in-law Scott Guy, in a long and arduous case that generated huge public interest and included televised court reports. It was King's much-reported passionate advocacy in this case that brought him to national attention across New Zealand and "made him a household name".

The New Zealand Law Society's summary of King's involvement in precedent-making cases includes the following: "He successfully argued in 2009 that Auckland liquor shop owner Virender Singh had exercised his rights to defend himself and his shop with a hockey stick against five teenagers. He was also counsel in the first and second ever successful criminal appeals to the Supreme Court. The first of these, R v Timoti [2006] 1 NZLR 323, 21 CRNZ 804, resulted in the overturning of a murder conviction from 1999, with the appeal focusing on the partial defence of provocation. Another Supreme Court success came in R v Wi [2010] 2 NZLR 11, 24 CRNZ 731, which reversed several lower court decisions and held that adducing evidence of a lack of previous convictions was still admissible under the Evidence Act 2006."

== Broadcasting career ==
King was the creator and host of The Court Report, a weekly television programme dealing with contemporary legal issues. The programme aired on TVNZ 7 before the station closed down in 2012. The show's format was a panel discussion or interview with legal experts and commentators with the aim of going "behind the headlines of the legal news stories of the day, to inform and educate, as well as entertain the profession and the public at large". In all, King hosted 68 episodes before retiring at the end of 2011. He continued on as an executive producer.

== Death ==
On the morning of 3 November 2012, King was found dead beside his car in Newlands, Wellington. He died by suicide, confirmed by the coroner's report released in October 2013. The coroner revealed that King left a suicide note in which he described himself as "exhausted, unwell, depressed and haunted by the dead from his numerous homicide cases." King said in the note that the trial he had been working on a week before his death "involved yet another terrible, unnecessary death and a lifestyle and community most New Zealanders would have no idea existed".

King's wife, Catherine Milnes-King, told the coroner that her husband was publicly slated after the trial of Ewen Macdonald, whom he successfully defended and who was acquitted of murdering Feilding farmer Scott Guy. She said that in the evening after delivering his closing address in the Macdonald case, her husband had a massive breakdown. The coroner revealed the suicide note explained: "he is haunted by the dead from his numerous homicide cases and hates himself for what he has done."

Law Society president Jonathan Temm said: "Throughout his career he represented clients who were often unpopular and he did that with real ability and determination." Former Labour Party leader David Shearer said: "Greg had one of this country's finest legal brains. There wouldn't be many New Zealanders who hadn't heard of him.

His funeral was attended by 800 mourners "from all walks of life."

=== Reputation ===
King has been described as a "theatrical criminal lawyer". After his death, legal experts praised his legal acumen, "which famously included wild-eyed closing arguments". National Criminal Bar Association president Tony Bouchier said: "He was a rising star of our profession... he was tenacious, fearless and had all the attributes that any criminal barrister would want. We have really lost an ally." During his career, he befriended those he met, including perpetrators and victims. He had an amicable relationship with Garth McVicar from the Sensible Sentencing Trust, with whom he had totally opposing views about the justice system.

== Personal life ==
King was married to fellow lawyer Catherine Milnes-King and was the father of two children. In 2011, the year before he died by suicide, he was diagnosed with diabetes.
