= Make It 16 Incorporated v Attorney-General =

2022 New Zealand Supreme Court judgment

- Court: Supreme Court of New Zealand
- Decided: 21 November 2022
- Citation: [2022] NZSC 134.

Case history
- Prior actions: [2021] NZCA 681.; [2020] NZHC 2630.

Court membership
- Judges sitting: Winkelmann CJ, Glazebrook, O'Regan, France, Kós JJ

Case opinions
- appeal allowed; declarations granted (per Winkelmann CJ, Glazebrook, O'Regan and France JJ) dissent (Kós J)

Keywords
- Voting age; electoral law

Make It 16 Incorporated v Attorney-General is a 2022 ruling of the Supreme Court of New Zealand in which the court held that the country's current voting age of 18 was discriminatory. The court found that the provisions in the Electoral Act 1993 and Local Electoral Act 2001 that set the voting age of 18 years was an unjustified limitation on the right to be free from age discrimination in section 19 of the New Zealand Bill of Rights Act 1990 (BORA).

In response to the judgment, Prime Minister Jacinda Ardern subsequently announced that a bill to lower the voting age to 16 would be debated in the New Zealand Parliament, requiring a supermajority to pass. Polling after the judgment by The New Zealand Herald showed that 79 per cent of respondents did not support lowering the voting age. Stuff reported in December 2022 that 73 mayors and councillors across the country had signed a letter supporting the Make It 16 campaign.

== Background ==
=== Make It 16 ===
Make It 16 was formed out of the New Zealand Youth Parliament in September 2019 to campaign for suffrage to be granted to 16- and 17-year-olds. When the youth-led campaign launched, its co-director Gina Dao-McLay said that "politicians were blocking the voices of 16 and 17-year-olds even though they could work fulltime, consent to sex, drive a car and own guns". Andrew Becroft, then Children's Commissioner, expressed his support for the campaign alongside several members of Parliament, notably the Green MP Chlöe Swarbrick.

=== High Court ===
On 24 August 2020, Make It 16 took their campaign to the Wellington High Court, arguing that the voting age of 18 is unjustified age discrimination under the Bill of Rights Act 1990 and urging the court to rule it as inconsistent with the Bill of Rights Act 1990.

On 7 October 2020, Justice Jan-Marie Doogue delivered her judgment and concluded that "the age restriction in the voting age provisions is a justified limit on the right in [section] 19 of BORA to be free from discrimination on the basis of age", highlighting an excerpt from Child Poverty Action Group Inc v Attorney-General of "Parliament's clear intention, in [section] 12 of BORA, to grant those aged 18 and over the right to vote in general elections" and that most countries currently have their voting age set at 18. As a result, she declined the application for a declaration of inconsistency. Attorney-General David Parker publicly stated that his position was that the High Court's judgment to decline the declarations sought was correct and that section 12 of the Bill of Rights Act settled any limitation on the voting age.

=== Court of Appeal ===
Make It 16, disagreeing with Doogue's judgment and saying "there was no good reason why they should be excluded", took their case to the Court of Appeal to appeal her decision. The court heard their appeal on 5 August 2021. On appeal, Make It 16 lawyer Emma Moran argued the Attorney-General had not justified the discrimination and that Doogue was incorrect in not granting declarations of inconsistency.

On 14 December 2021, the Court of Appeal's judgment from Justices Christine French, Forest Miller and Patricia Courtney was given by Justice French. In contrast from the High Court judgment, the Court of Appeal ruled that the "Attorney-General has not established that the limits on the right of 16- and 17-year-olds to be free from age discrimination caused by the voting age provisions are reasonable limits that can be demonstrably justified in a free and democratic society". However, despite ruling that it was unjustified age discrimination, the court chose to exercise restraint and decline the applications for declarations of inconsistency, citing that suffrage being extended to 16-year-olds was an issue "very much in the public arena already" and that it is "an intensely and quintessentially political issue involving the democratic process".

When speaking to Radio New Zealand, Thomas Pope-Kerr from Make It 16 noted their frustration on not getting the declaration but said that the group was taking the court's ruling as a win and would likely be appealing to the Supreme Court to seek a declaration of inconsistency.

== Judgment ==
On 13 April 2022, the group's appeal of the Court of Appeal's decision to the Supreme Court was granted leave. Make It 16 co-director Caeden Tipler stated to The New Zealand Herald, "A formal declaration from the Supreme Court would be a powerful message to Parliament that they should fix this breach of our rights". The Court then heard the case on 12 July 2022.

=== Majority opinion ===
On 21 November 2022, Justice Ellen France gave the Supreme Court's judgment on Make It 16's case that the voting age of 18 was unjustified age discrimination. Chief Justice Helen Winkelmann, and Justices Susan Glazebrook, Mark O'Regan and Ellen France ruled in the majority that the provisions of the Electoral Act 1993 and Local Electoral Act 2001 were inconsistent with the right to be free from discrimination on the basis of age and that they had not been justified under section 5 of the Bill of Rights Act. They thus ruled to grant declarations of inconsistency in those provisions. In their ruling, they agreed with the Court of Appeal's assessment that it was unjustified age discrimination and sought to assess whether that court was right not to issue the declarations.

Make It 16 argued that "where there is an inconsistency which has not been justified, there should be a presumption (in civil cases) that a declaration will follow so that there is an effective remedy for rights infringements" and that "[is consistent with] the approach adopted in cases in the Australian Capital Territory to the making of a declaration of incompatibility" under section 32 of the Human Rights Act 2004. The group also observed that the courts in the United Kingdom on making declarations of incompatibility with the European Convention on Human Rights had engaged in "policy-heavy issues".

Conversely, the Attorney-General argued that "the equivalent New Zealand jurisprudence [on declarations of inconsistency] is in its infancy" and that the Court of Appeal's ruling to exercise restraint was correct and that "a declaration would be premature where Parliament has expressly postponed any consideration of the question until there is broad democratic support for the change". From there the Attorney-General further noted with respect to it already being a political issue was that the voting age was already identified as a matter for review in the Independent Panel reviewing electoral law, and that Green MP Golriz Ghahraman's Electoral (Strengthening Democracy) Amendment Bill which, among other things, lowered the voting age to 16, failed its first reading on 21 September 2022.

In its assessment, the Supreme Court considered the arguments given and said that it was "not persuaded it would be premature to make a declaration". It noted that lowering the voting age to 16 was previously mentioned in the Royal Commission on the Electoral System in 1986, which stated that there was "a strong case" that could be made, and recommended Parliament to "keep the voting age under review".

The court's majority determined that the court should "fulfil [its] role which is to declare the law", concurring with United Kingdom Supreme Court Justice Lady Hale in her opinion in Nicklinson: "we have no jurisdiction to impose anything: that is a matter for Parliament alone. We do have jurisdiction, and in some circumstances an obligation, to form a professional opinion, as judges, as to the content of the Convention rights and the compatibility of the present law with them. Our personal opinions, as human beings, ... do not come into it." As a result of this, the court stated that the "Court of Appeal erred in declining to grant the declaratory relief sought", resulting in the declarations sought being granted.

=== Dissent ===
Justice Stephen Kós dissented from the court's majority stating that he did not consider the voting age of 18 under the Electoral Act 1993 for parliamentary elections to be inconsistent with the Bill of Rights Act as he considered the right to vote in parliamentary elections at 18 years under section 12 of the Bill of Rights Act as prevailing over the right to be free from discrimination on the basis of age under section 19. He refuted the Court of Appeal and current court's opinion which construed that "section 12 as simply protecting 18 year-old voters against an increase in the voting age" is "too narrow of a view". In this, he discussed that the voting age provisions were reserved provisions, and that those reserved provisions do not only "protect against diminution of voter qualification ... They also protected qualified voters against enlargement of voter qualification.", and that constitutionally reserved provisions, affirmed by section 12 of the Bill of Rights Act, should prevail over the generalised right to be free from discrimination under section 19. Furthermore, while noting that in this instance the statutory interpretation canon generalia specialibus non derogant (general provisions do not derogate from specific ones) should not need to be applied in this case, he said that Parliament's silence in amending section 12 in 1993 when passing the Electoral Act 1993 and keeping the voting age entrenched at 18 is "persuasive"; however, Kós also noted that when applying lex specialis, it "propels analysis in the same direction".

However, Kós concurred with the court's majority on local elections. He stated, "A declaration of inconsistency must be made in relation to the provisions of the Local Electoral Act" and explained that his dissenting opinion on the age to vote for parliamentary elections does not apply to local elections, as "those provisions stand alone, unaffected (and unprotected) by section 12 [of the Bill of Rights Act]. They are inconsistent with section 19, and the Attorney-General does not attempt to justify the inconsistency under section 5." Kós ended his opinion noting the importance of public appreciation that what has been made "is a declaration of inconsistency, not illegality", and that "Parliament is the sole arbiter of the content of legislation; the courts are the sole arbiters of legislative interpretation."

== Responses ==
Following the Supreme Court ruling, Prime Minister Jacinda Ardern expressed support for lowering the voting age to 16 years. She announced that the Labour Government would introduce legislation lowering the voting age to 16 years; this law change requires a 75% majority as it is a 'reserved provision' under the Electoral Act 1993. By contrast, National Party justice spokesperson Paul Goldsmith stated that his party would not be supporting lowering the voting age on the grounds that it regarded the current voting age of 18 years as appropriate. Goldsmith described the government's proposed law change as a distraction from youth crime.

On 22 November 2022, Ardern and Deputy Prime Minister Grant Robertson confirmed that the Labour ministers were considering whether to allow 16-year-olds to vote in local body elections. Unlike parliamentary elections, law changes for local body elections would only require a simple majority. In response, ACT leader David Seymour, who had earlier opposed lowering the voting age for parliamentary elections, indicated that he was open to lowering the voting age for local body elections and would allow ACT MPs a conscience vote on the matter.

On 16 January 2024, the Independent Election Review released its two-year investigation of the country's electoral system. Their report recommended lowering the voting age from 18 to 16 years. In response, Justice Minister Goldsmith stated that the National-led coalition government would not be lowering the voting age but accepted their recommendation to extend parliamentary terms from three to four years.

=== Extending suffrage for local elections ===
On 13 March 2023, Prime Minister Chris Hipkins scrapped plans for legislation to lower the voting age in general elections, stating his plan to focus on lowering the voting age in local elections instead, and introduced the Electoral (Lowering Voting Age for Local Elections and Polls) Legislation Bill to lower the voting age to 16 years for local elections in mid-August 2023. The bill passed its first reading on 29 August during the last sitting week of Parliament prior to its dissolution before the 2023 New Zealand general election.

On 26 January 2024, Local Government Minister Simeon Brown confirmed that the Government would halt plans to progress the previous Government's Lowering Voting Age Bill, ending plans to lower the voting age to 16 years for local council elections.

== See also ==
- New Zealand Bill of Rights Act 1990
- Voting in New Zealand
- Voting age § Debate on lowering the voting age to 16
