= Joanna Lee =

Joanna Lee may refer to:

- Joanna Lee (exorcism victim) (c. 1963–2000), Korean woman killed during an exorcism
- Joanna Lee (writer) (1931–2003), American writer, producer, and director
