= Eugene Thomas =

Eugene Thomas may refer to:

- Eugene Thomas (murder victim) (died 1994), New Zealand murder victim
- Eugène Thomas (1903–1969), French politician

== See also ==
- Gene Thomas (disambiguation)
