= Gene Thomas (disambiguation) =

Gene Thomas is an American football player.

Gene Thomas may also refer to:

- Gene Thomas (murder victim)
- Gene Thomas (musician), American country musician

== See also ==
- Jean Thomas (disambiguation)
- Eugene Thomas (disambiguation)
