= Simon France =

New Zealand lawyer (1958–2023)

The Honourable Simon France

Judge of the Court of Appeal
- In office 26 August 2022 – 28 February 2023

Judge of the High Court
- In office 19 January 2005 – 26 August 2022

Personal details
- Born: Simon Peter France; 29 May 1958 Wellington, New Zealand
- Died: 8 April 2023 (aged 64) Wellington, New Zealand
- Spouse: Ellen France (m. 1981)
- Education: University of Auckland; Queen's University

Simon Peter France (29 May 1958 – 8 April 2023) was a New Zealand lawyer and jurist. He was a judge of the High Court from 2005 until 2022, and the Court of Appeal from 2022 until his death.

== Early life and family ==
Born in Wellington on 29 May 1958, France was the youngest of five children. He grew up in Whangārei and was educated at Pompallier Catholic College, where he was head prefect and dux in 1975. He went on to earn a Bachelor of Laws degree at the University of Auckland in 1979.

In January 1981, France married Ellen Larkin, who he had met during his first year at law school in Auckland, and they both then undertook postgraduate studies in Canada, at Queen's University at Kingston. France completed a Master of Laws degree there in 1983.

== Academic and judge ==
On his return to New Zealand in 1984, France became a law lecturer at Victoria University of Wellington. In 1995, he joined the Crown Law Office as a senior appellate lawyer. He was appointed as a judge of the High Court on 19 January 2005 and remained with the High Court in Wellington until 2022. During that time he was the judge who presided over several complicated and high-profile criminal cases, including the trial of Ewen Macdonald for the murder of Scott Guy in 2012, and the 2015 retrial of Mark Lundy for the Lundy murders. He was appointed to the Court of Appeal on 26 August 2022 and retired from that court on 28 February 2023 because of ill-health. Fellow High Court judge, Sir Ron Young, has stated that, in court, France's intellect was evident as he coped with extremely complex issues, interpreting abstruse evidence and arcane legal principles for juries of laypeople but that he was also compassionate with those appearing before him as defendants or witnesses. Young said that "[France] was just damn bright". France was a "devout Roman Catholic".

== Tandem careers ==
France's wife, Ellen France, is a judge of the Supreme Court of New Zealand. After meeting during their first year at the University of Auckland law school, and both doing postgraduate study in Canada, they worked together in the Crown Law Office. Ellen France, was appointed to the High Court in 2002 and in 2006 appointed to the Court of Appeal (to which her husband was appointed 16 years later). She was president of the Court of Appeal for two years before her appointment to the Supreme Court in 2016.

== Death ==
France died in Wellington on 8 April 2023, at the age of 64.
