= Killing of Scott Guy =

New Zealand unsolved murder case

In July 2010, Scott Guy, a New Zealand farmer, was shot dead at the gate of his family farm in Feilding, Manawatū-Whanganui, at age 31. Six months later, his brother-in-law, Ewen Macdonald, was charged with murder. Macdonald was married to Guy's sister, Anna, and Guy had been best man at their wedding. Both men managed the Guys' family farm and surrounding properties on Aorangi Road, just outside of Feilding. At the trial, it was disclosed that Guy and Macdonald had different priorities and a competitive relationship. In 2008, two years before he was killed, Guy announced at a family meeting that he expected to inherit the farm. The defence claimed that by the time of the murder, difficulties between the two had settled down and they were getting on well.

The case captured the attention of the New Zealand media and public for two years prior to the trial, at which Macdonald was acquitted. He was defended by lawyer Greg King, who committed suicide four months after the end of the trial. Guy's killer has never been brought to justice. However, the police are treating it as a closed case and are not looking for anyone else.

== Background ==
Scott Guy was a farmer who grew up on Byreburn, his family's farm, near Feilding, Manawatū-Whanganui, New Zealand. Ewen Macdonald had worked at the farm since leaving school at 16. Macdonald ran the dairy operation, was married to Guy's sister Anna, and had four children together with her. Guy was responsible for raising the calves and growing crops for the cows. Guy and Macdonald both earned around $100,000 a year working as farm managers for Guy's parents, who owned the property. The court was told that at a family meeting in 2008, Guy said he expected to inherit the family farm, and that this led to tension between him and his brother in law. In May 2008, Scott Guy's parents, Bryan and Jo, transferred 400 shares, representing 20 per cent of the business, to Scott, Macdonald and each of their wives.

Bryan Guy testified at the trial that he explained to his son, Scott, that he was not going to inherit the farm and that to own it, he would have to buy everyone else out. The tension appeared to have subsided and Bryan reported that in the previous 12 months "everyone seemed to be getting along really well". Two weeks before Scott Guy died, he and MacDonald travelled to Invercargill together for a dairying conference. Nikki Guy, Scott's other sister, said the pair had a "fantastic time".

One of the Guys' former farm workers, Callum Boe, told police that he and Macdonald had gone on night time trips that they called 'missions' in which they trespassed, poached deer, and took revenge on farmers who had caught them by secretly returning to destroy valuable livestock and property. He told police that on one "mission" in October 2008, they torched an old home on Guy's section. In January 2009, about 18 months before the shooting, they vandalised a home being built by Guy and his wife Kylee, causing $14,000 worth of damage. At the time, no one but Boe and Macdonald knew who was responsible.

== Shooting ==
Scott Guy was shot dead at the end of his driveway after he stopped to open a farm gate somewhere between 4:43 am and 5:00 am on 8 July 2010. He died from shotgun wounds to his neck, face and arm. His body was discovered by David Berry, a truck driver, at about 7:00 am. Berry called the police at 7:08 am and then called his landlord, Bruce Johnstone. When Johnstone arrived, he took a quick look at the body and phoned Macdonald at 7:16 am. Two police cars soon arrived and Macdonald arrived on his quadbike shortly after. Macdonald immediately rang Guy's father at 7:21 am sounding distressed and incoherent.

Adding to the mystery, three chocolate coloured Labrador puppies also disappeared from the farm at the time of Guy's death. The police claimed, Macdonald stole the puppies to make it look like a burglary gone wrong.

== Trial ==
=== Prosecution ===
At the trial, the Crown alleged Guy still wanted to take control of the farm and two years earlier had gone to a family meeting explaining that he expected to inherit the farm. There had been tension between Guy and Macdonald and the prosecutor claimed "this (demand) might as well have been his death warrant". Crown prosecutor Ben Vanderkolk alleged Macdonald closed the farm gates which forced Guy to stop and get out of his vehicle. Vanderkolk said when Guy got out, Macdonald shot him in the throat and then in the face. Police believe the killing occurred at about 4:43 am.

Vanderkolk alleged Macdonald used the farm shotgun and was wearing size 9 Proline dive boots while committing the crime. The boot prints found at the scene were the only forensic evidence police had potentially linking Macdonald to the scene. Macdonald allegedly then rode his bicycle back to the farm which was 1.46 km away, arriving just after 5 am where he was milking the cows. Vanderkolk claimed Macdonald tried to make it look like a robbery by killing the Labrador puppies which were missing. Police excavated some of the property where Macdonald lived looking for the dive boots, dead puppies and the shotgun cartridges - but found nothing.

=== Defence ===
Defence lawyer Greg King said there were four fatal flaws in the Crown case. The prosecution claimed Guy was killed by two blasts from the farm shotgun which occurred at 4:43 am. Four nearby residents testified they heard three shots in quick succession at about 5:00 am. King called witnesses who said that Macdonald was seen on the farm at about 5:00 am so he could not have been the killer. King also called an American shooting champion as an expert witness. The witness said the farm shotgun had to be reloaded after two shots so it was not possible for three shots to be fired that quickly. In his summing up at the end of the trial, King added that if there were three shots, the murder weapon could not be the farm's double-barrel shotgun. The expert witness suggested that a semi-automatic weapon had been used.

King also challenged the forensic expert David Neale about the size of the footprints found at the scene. Neale told the Court there were more than 50 footprints next to Guy's body, and they were all made by size 9 Proline boots. King said the 33 wavy rows on the plaster impressions of the boots presented by the police were not compatible with size 9. He said the prints came from a size 11 or 12 boot. Macdonald's wife, Anna, confirmed that Macdonald's size 9 boots had been thrown out two years earlier.

King also said the police ignored other possible suspects and failed to investigate car tyre marks at the scene of the crime and the sighting of a mystery sedan on Aorangi Rd. He said Police also failed to investigate an offender who had a history of shotgun crimes and had committed a string of local burglaries. A cigarette packet found outside the house matched one stolen by the burglar with a history of shotgun crimes. Concerns were also raised about another man who came looking for Guy at his home a few days before his death.

=== Verdict ===
In July 2012, after 11 hours deliberation, the jury found Macdonald not guilty. After a short break, Justice Simon France remanded Macdonald for a sentencing date on other charges. A year later, Guy's father Bryan insisted that justice had prevailed. He said that he did not want the case to drag on for years without being solved and made a plea to his son's killer to give himself up.

=== Kylee Guy's response ===
Scott's wife, Kylee Guy subsequently tried to track down her husband's killer and enlisted a private investigator, Mike Crawford, to conduct the investigation. After 18 months, the investigation was called off due to financial issues. Although it was called off, Crawford said Scott Guy received a number of phone calls the day before he died, and another on the day of his murder. However, there was no information about these calls, such as cell-site data and subscriber details, in the police file on Guy's murder. Crawford thought these calls might have shed some light on who the killer was.

== Other suspects ==
At the start of the investigation, police said there were nearly 60 people they looked at as possible suspects. One of them was a man who committed an aggravated robbery four days before Scott was killed. He stole a carton of Winfield Gold cigarettes and police found a cigarette of that brand on Scott's driveway near the murder site. Police stopped investigating him after his girlfriend, who was a methamphetamine addict, told police he came home "maybe around 4am" but admitted she was "pretty wrecked" on meth herself. A number of people told police this man, who has name suppression, was involved in the murder.

Farmworker Matthew Ireland testified that he saw a car coming from the direction of Scott Guy's house, as he arrived at the farm – almost exactly at the time the police believe Scott was murdered. Ireland also said there was a second car coming from the same direction, just after 5am, as they rode towards the milking shed. The police have never identified either of these cars. Peter Coles, one of Macdonald's lawyers, said "The only way you'd be on that road is if you knew of its existence and had some reason to be there – it's not State Highway 1. The failure to find either of those cars, despite it being publicised throughout New Zealand, just defies belief, unless that car is connected with the murder." Coles is convinced the police disregarded suspects who were more likely to have been involved.

Another suspect was suggested by Dave Berry, who was the first to come across Guy's body. Two weeks before Guy was shot he recalled a "tall, unshaven man with dark hair" smelling of alcohol and cigarettes. The man banged on his door looking for Scott.

Another focus of inquiry was assistant farm manager, Simon Asplin, who'd had a grudge against Scott since they were at school together. He subsequently disclosed that "Scott's pissed a lot of people off." When Mr Guy returned to the farm in 2008, Asplin lost his favourite job driving the tractors on the farm. At the trial, he acknowledged that he gained from Guy's death because "he was back on the tractor where he belonged".

== Media and public interest ==
The high-profile case took the attention of the public for nearly two years. The trial lasted four weeks and was scrutinised in detail by the media. During the trial, the public gallery was usually full with up to 100 people sometimes lined up outside hoping to get a glimpse of the proceedings. Law professor Chris Gallavin from Massey University says the case interested the public because it involved "beautiful, affluent white people" from a small, conservative rural town...(and) "showed the rest of the country their family dynamics are as messed up as anyone else.

== Subsequent events ==
There were a number of other outstanding charges. In June 2007, Macdonald and Callum Boe had killed 19 calves belonging to a farmer who had caught them poaching his deer. Macdonald was also convicted for burning down an old whare (house) and emptying thousands of dollars' worth of milk from a vat on another neighbour's farm. These acts were committed "for retribution" after Macdonald and Boe were informed on for trespassing and made to apologise. Anna Macdonald testified at the murder trial that her husband's relationship with Boe was "immature", and she was unaware of what they were doing on their regular night "missions". When police found out about these missions, they visited Boe, who by this time had moved to Queenstown. Boe admitted to his involvement and, in the process, provided police with an insight into Macdonald's behaviour. They arrested Macdonald and charged him with murder soon afterward.

In September 2012, Macdonald was jailed for five years on the lesser charges. He was eligible to attend his first parole hearing in December 2012. On 3 November 2012, Macdonald's well-known lawyer, Greg King, was found dead in Wellington. The finding of the coroner, released in October 2013, was that the death had been a suicide.

In November 2014, it was reported that Macdonald had been denied parole for a third time and his term of imprisonment might run until completion of his sentence on 6 April 2016. He was granted parole at his fourth appearance before a parole board on 13 October 2015 and was freed from prison on 2 November 2015, subject to strict terms of parole.

== Books ==
Who Killed Scott Guy? by Mike White. It outlines why the author believes the jury was right and Macdonald was not the killer.

== See also ==
- List of unsolved murders (2000–present)
- Murder of Harvey and Jeannette Crewe
