= Jean Thomas =

Jean Thomas may refer to:

- Dame Jean Thomas (biochemist) (born 1942), Welsh biochemist and chancellor of Swansea University
- Jean Thomas (novelist), pseudonym of American romantic novelist Robert "Bob" Rogers
- Jean Bell Thomas (1881–1982), American photographer and folk festival promoter

== See also ==
- Gene Thomas (disambiguation)
