= Stephen Kós =

New Zealand judge

The Honourable Sir Stephen Kós KNZM KC
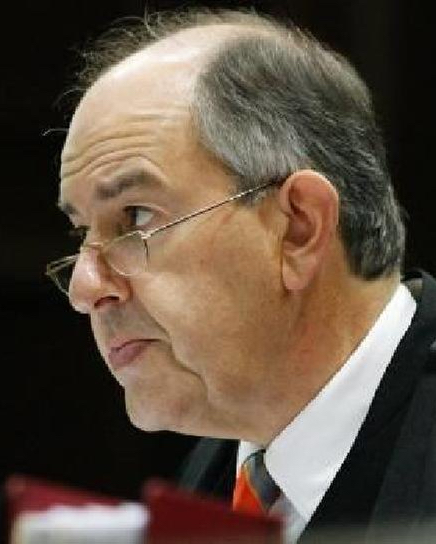

Justice of the Supreme Court
- Incumbent
- Assumed office 22 April 2022
- Preceded by: Sir William Young

President of the Court of Appeal
- In office 22 July 2016 – 21 April 2022
- Preceded by: Dame Ellen France
- Succeeded by: Mark Cooper

Personal details
- Born: John Stephen Kós; 23 January 1959 (age 67) Otago, New Zealand
- Education: Victoria University of Wellington; University of Cambridge

Sir John Stephen Kós, KNZM KC (born 23 January 1959) is a New Zealand judge on the Supreme Court of New Zealand and the former President of the Court of Appeal of New Zealand.

== Early life and career ==
The son of a Hungarian refugee, Kós was born in Mosgiel, Otago, in 1959 and raised in Wainuiomata. Kós attended Naenae College. He matriculated at the Victoria University of Wellington to study law in 1976 where he later graduated LLB(Hons) in 1981 where he won the Chapman Tripp Prize for his graduating year.

After graduating from University of Cambridge (Sidney Sussex College) in 1985 with an LLM, Kós began a career in commercial litigation. In 1985, he became a partner in Perry Wylie Pope & Page, and later a partner in Russell McVeagh in 1988. He went to the independent bar in 2005 and was appointed as a Queen's Counsel in 2007. He founded Stout Street Chambers, a leading set of barristers, in 2007 with three other QCs.

== Judicial career ==
In April 2011, Kós was appointed to the High Court of New Zealand. He was elevated to the Court of Appeal in September 2015, and succeeding Ellen France as President of the court in July 2016.

As President, he focused on revising the rules of the Court and reforming its processes, introducing a policy to encourage junior counsel to address the Court, and creating three-week sessions of the Permanent Court, followed by two-week circuits by Divisional Courts (with writing time for other judges). He established regular divisional sittings in Christchurch and Dunedin and more Permanent Court sittings on cases of public interest in Auckland. He also led the project to establish a branch of the Court in the heritage precinct at the Auckland High Court, which opened in 2020.

On 8 April 2022, it was announced that Kós would be appointed a judge to the Supreme Court of New Zealand.

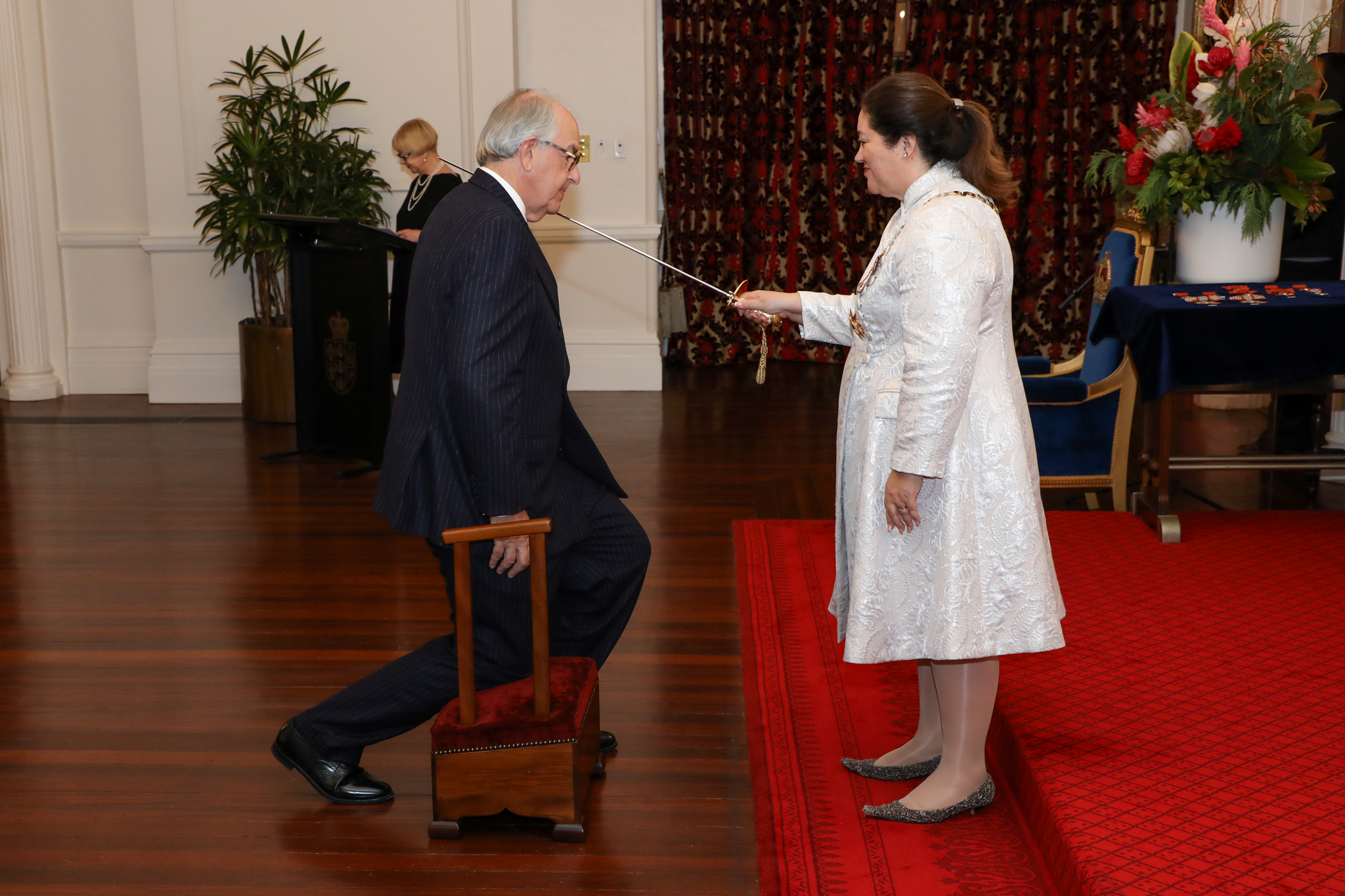
Investiture of Kós as a Knight Companion of the New Zealand Order of Merit by the governor-general, Dame Cindy Kiro, at Government House, Wellington, on 21 September 2023

He is a Distinguished Fellow at the Victoria University Law School. He was formerly Pro-Chancellor of Massey University. He was the 2022/23 James Merralls Fellow at Melbourne University Law School.In June 2024 he was made an Honorary Bencher of the Middle Temple.

In the 2023 King's Birthday and Coronation Honours, Kós was appointed a Knight Companion of the New Zealand Order of Merit, for services to the judiciary and legal education.

== Notable cases ==
Justice Kós wrote the judgments in a number of notable cases: in criminal law he wrote the guideline judgment on serious drug offence sentencing (Zhang v R), on mental health deficits as a mitigating factor in sentencing generally (Orchard v R) and judgments in appeals concerning the manslaughter of 3 year-old Moko Rangitoheriri (Shailer v R) and the murder of British backpacker Grace Millane (Kempson v R), in civil and public law he has written leading judgments on fiduciary duties and economic duress (Dold v Murphy) the doctrine of penalties (Wilaci Pty Ltd v Torchlight Fund, 127 Hobson Street Ltd v Honey Bees Preschool Ltd), defamation (Hagaman v Little, Craig v MacGregor) and prospective costs and Beddoe orders in trusts cases (Woodward v Smith, McCallum v McCallum), a judgment in which Kos sought to rein in background evidence admissible in a contract interpretation case did not survive further appeal to the Supreme Court (Bathurst Resources Ltd v L&M Coal Holdings Ltd). In the Supreme Court he dissented in the voting rights case, holding that the 18-year qualification threshold in the Electoral Act was not inconsistent with the Bill of Rights Act (Make It 16 Incorporated v Attorney-General).

== Extra-judicial writing ==
Justice Kós has written in three particular areas:

=== Civil remedies ===
As co-author of Butler's Equity and Trusts in New Zealand and Blanchard's Civil Remedies in New Zealand.

=== Civil and criminal justice reform ===
In 2016 he advocated a civil law inquisitorial approach for unrepresented litigants, to improve access to justice. In 2018 he gave a speech to Victim Support advocating new approaches to sentencing and corrections, in particular changes to home detention and prison sentencing.

=== Legal history ===
Kós has written extensively on connections between legal and political history – on New Zealand's nuclear treaty cases in the International Court of Justice, constitutional law (and the case of Fitzgerald v Muldoon), on appellate history, and on jurisprudential differences between New Zealand and Australia.
