= Investigate (magazine) =

- The cover of the October 2006 issue of Investigate.
- Editor: Ian Wishart
- Categories: Newsmagazine
- Frequency: Monthly
- Circulation: 8,278
- First issue: January 2000
- Final issue: June 2015 (print)
- Company: Howling at the Moon Publishing Limited
- Country: New Zealand
- Language: English
- Website: www.investigatemagazine.com

Investigate was a current affairs magazine published in New Zealand. It had a conservative Christian editorial standpoint and published a number of controversial articles. Many of the more notable articles were critical of policies and members of the centre-left Fifth Labour Government of New Zealand which governed from December 1999 until November 2008. It was edited by Ian Wishart. New New Zealand First MP Richard Prosser used to write a column called Eyes Right in the magazine, and his book Uncommon Dissent has been heavily promoted by the group. In June 2015, Investigate ceased print publication and announced that it would become a solely online publication; citing declining circulation and sales at supermarkets.

== History ==
Investigate magazine was established by Ian Wishart and his wife Heidi in January 2000. The first issue was published in February 2000. In 2011, Investigate magazine underwent a radical redesign into a "HIS/HER" format with content being divided into separate male and female sections. This redesign received mixed responses from its readership base.

=== Agent Orange production in New Plymouth ===
In October 2000, Investigate published a story of alleged chemical contamination in New Plymouth by the Dow Chemical Company's local subsidiary, which had produced the herbicides 2,4,5-T and 2,4-D at their factory in the city. In January 2001 Investigate then published an interview with a former senior executive of the chemical company who confirmed not only that the two herbicides had been mixed to produce the defoliant Agent Orange for Britain's use in the Malayan Emergency and the U.S. use in the Vietnam War, but also that surplus drums of the toxic substance had been buried on nearby land now covered by a housing subdivision.

The magazine then obtained a file kept by a former senior hospital matron in the 1960s and 70s, documenting dozens of bizarre birth defects in local children often associated with dioxin poisoning. The magazine published those pictures in its April 2001 issue. A Ministry of Health report in 2004 found increased levels of dioxin in the blood of long-term residents of the area, but with no clear indication that this had increased rates of disease. A larger study in 2008 of former workers in the Dow factory showed low levels of dioxin in their blood and no link between dioxin and health issues.

=== John Tamihere Interview ===
The 4 April 2005 issue of Investigate contains an interview with then Labour MP John Tamihere. In the article Tamihere makes a number of allegations, including accusing Prime Minister Helen Clark of being unable to deal with emotions, that Labour deliberately lost the 1993 general election, and that it is "very dangerous" to be in the Labour Party if "you're a free and independent spirit". He also is recorded as making insulting remarks about Michael Cullen, Steve Maharey, the gay MPs of the Labour Party, and about women in leadership generally.

=== Alleged links with the Exclusive Brethren ===
Former Prime Minister Helen Clark claimed that rumours about her husband's sexuality reported by Investigate were connected to the Exclusive Brethren, after members of the church hired a private investigator, Wayne Idour, to follow Labour MPs and their spouses, and a letter to the editor from a member of the church was published in the Dominion Post referring obliquely to allegations published by Investigate. Idour is one of the sources for Investigate's May 2007 story about police corruption. Wishart responded by calling Labour's allegations a "baseless conspiracy theory", and said he had previously accounted for all his investigations into Labour MPs, and the Exclusive Brethren had not contributed in any way. "I wouldn't know an Exclusive Brethren person if I fell over one," he said.

=== Preachers of Hate ===
The March 2007 issue contains an article entitled Preachers of hate, alleging that Islamic terrorists have infiltrated New Zealand's Muslim community. The article was condemned as "negative stereotyping" in an open letter penned by political activist Grant Morgan and signed by well over a hundred New Zealanders, including many academic, religious and community leaders. A follow-up article alleged that some of the signatories had not actually read the magazine article, despite signing the letter condemning it.

=== Richard Prosser's 'Wogistan' article ===
Prosser has written the 'Eyes Right' column in Investigate magazine for 10 years.

In his February 2013 column, Prosser stated; "If you are a young male, aged between say about 19 and about 35, and you're a Muslim, or you look like a Muslim, or you come from a Muslim country, then you are not welcome to travel on any of the West's airlines." Prosser further stated that the rights of New Zealanders' were being "denigrated by a sorry pack of misogynist troglodytes from Wogistan, threatening our way of life and security of travel in the name of their stone age religion, its barbaric attitudes towards women, democracy, and individual choice". Prosser wrote that "Abdul" should not be allowed to fly, and should instead "go ride a camel". It subsequently emerged that Prosser's column was written after a pocket-knife he was carrying had been confiscated by airport security. NZ First leader Winston Peters initially said that he would not apologise for Prosser's conduct, that he had been writing in his capacity as a columnist, as opposed to an MP, that Prosser stood by his statements, and that he had spoken to Prosser about the article as the article "lacked balance".

Subsequently, Prosser came under criticism from the Government and Opposition parties for the content of his article. Prosser stated that his intention had been to draw attention to the issue of passenger profiling at airports, and stated that his writing style was intentionally one of a "shock jock". He initially refused to apologise, but later admitted his article lacked balance, apologising for the offence that he had caused. He stated he would not continue to write for Investigate.

=== Press Council complaints ===
The New Zealand Press Council has made two rulings concerning Investigate. The first, in 2001, concerned a complaint by the Immunisation Advisory Centre about two stories on vaccine safety. The complaint was not upheld, and the council noted that "Campaigning magazines such as Investigate aim to jolt readers into looking at things differently, and use hard-hitting tactics. It was unfair of the magazine to headline Dr Sinclair’s response to Simon Jones article: gutter journalism scares parents: health authorities, implying she had used that derogatory term in her response. However, the Press Council does not think that, taken overall, the Investigate articles go beyond what is acceptable in this adversary style of journalism." The second upheld complaints by Air New Zealand about an article in the September 2007 issue of Investigate magazine headlined on the cover: "Exclusive. Air NZ’s secret flights. Why our state-owned airline is flying US troops into war". The Press Council criticised the lack of opportunity Air New Zealand had to respond to Investigate's allegations, saying "The editor conceded and apologised for one mistake, and sought to minimise others. Those mistakes, however, would likely have been amended or at least challenged had the magazine referred its story to the airline. The editor’s explanation for not doing so reveals a regrettable lack of faith in Air New Zealand that serves neither journalism nor the airline well. Good journalism demands fairness and the editor’s allegation that taking such a step would have led to his scoop effectively being sabotaged is disturbing."

=== Shift to online publication ===
In June 2015, Investigate's editor Ian Wishart announced in the magazine's June/July 2015 editorial, entitled "The famous final Scene", that the magazine would be ceasing all print publication. The editorial cited several factors including plummeting circulations (13,500 in its heyday to 8,278 copies in early 2015), declining magazine sales in supermarkets, and a shift towards online advertising during the 2008 financial crisis. The magazine's management had also toyed and ultimately rejected a plan to increase the price from NZ$8.60 to NZ$15.90. Due to high traffic on its website (averaging two million pageviews a month), Investigate magazine had decided to shift all operations online. Besides the website, Investigate magazine also operates Facebook and Twitter accounts. However, the website is now only sporadically updated and seems to be little more than an aggregator website for news stories from more mainstream news websites. Investigate appears to have shifted to a new website called "InvestigateDaily"

== See also ==
- Behind the Exclusive Brethren
