= Mike Antunovic =

New Zealand criminal defence lawyer

- Born: Ivan Michael Antunovic
- Education: Victoria University of Wellington
- Occupation: Criminal defence lawyer

Ivan Michael Antunovic is a New Zealand criminal defence lawyer.

== High-profile cases ==
=== Olivia Hope and Ben Smart murder ===
Along with Greg King, Antunovic was co-defence counsel for Scott Watson, who was charged with the double murder of Ben Smart and Olivia Hope. Watson was found guilty of the murders. On appeal, Antunovic and King failed to convince the Privy Council to overturn the conviction.

=== Death of Janet Moses by family members using exorcism ===
In 2007, 22-year-old Janet Moses died after members of her family poured water into her eyes and down her throat at a Wainuiomata flat. Antunovic, acting for the defense, argued (unsuccessfully) that instead of trying to commit a criminal offence, the defendants were in reality trying to help Moses. Five members of Moses' family were convicted of manslaughter.
