= Pukekawa =

Locality in Waikato, New Zealand

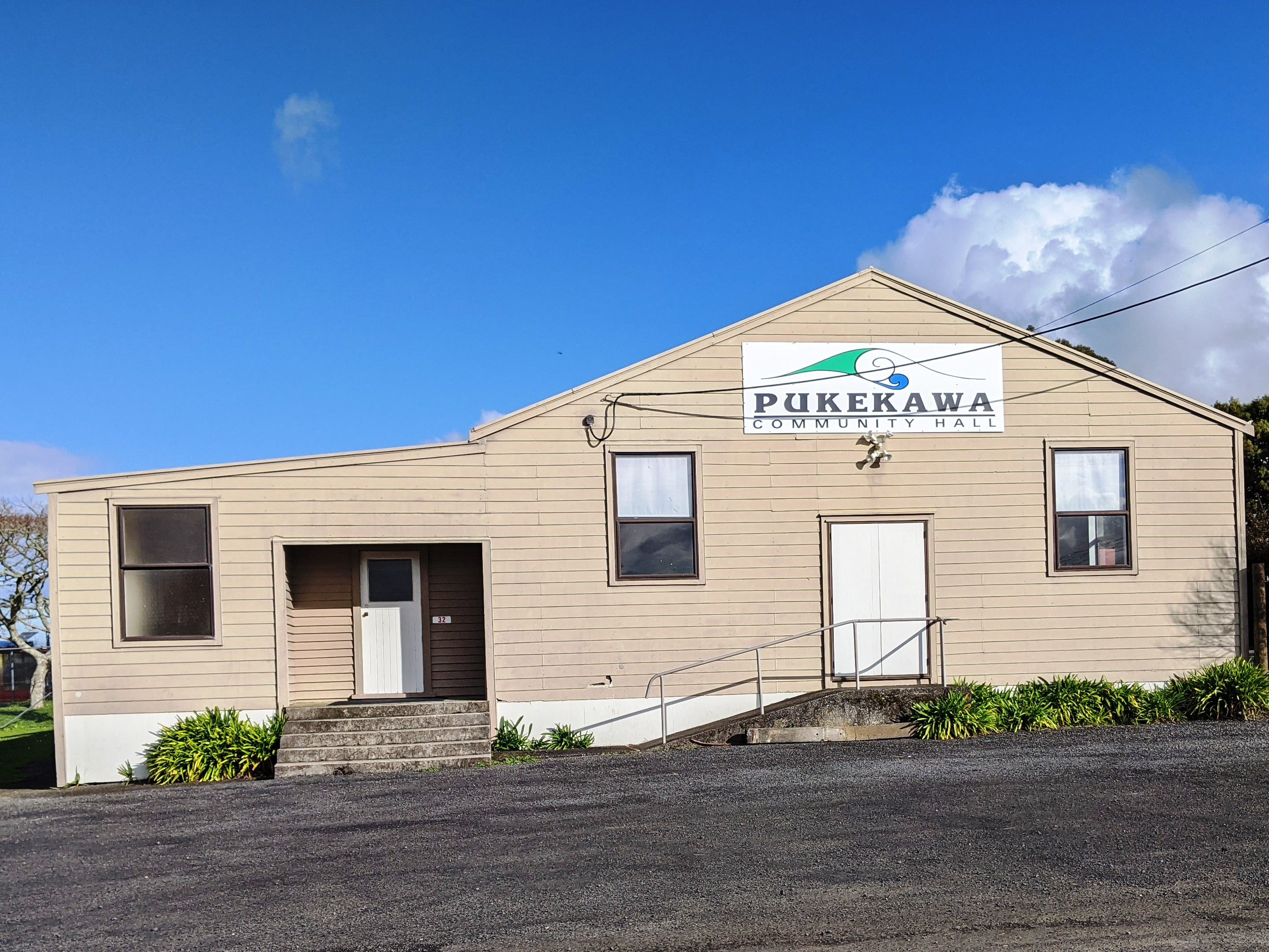
- Pukekawa Hall
- Interactive map of Pukekawa
- Coordinates: 37°20′38″S 174°59′03″E
- Country: New Zealand
- Region: Waikato
- District: Waikato District
- Wards: Awaroa-Maramarua General Ward; Tai Raro Takiwaa Maaori Ward
- Community: Rural-Port Waikato Community
- Electorates: Port Waikato; Hauraki-Waikato (Māori)

Government
  - Territorial Authority: Waikato District Council
  - Regional council: Waikato Regional Council
  - Mayor of Waikato: Aksel Bech
  - Port Waikato MP: Andrew Bayly
  - Hauraki-Waikato MP: Hana-Rawhiti Maipi-Clarke

Area
  - Total: 19.71 km^{2} (7.61 sq mi)

Population (2023 Census)
  - Total: 381
  - Density: 19.3/km^{2} (50.1/sq mi)

Pukekawa is a town in the Lower Waikato River area of New Zealand's North Island, 66 km south of central Auckland. The area's fertile soils are used to grow a range of vegetables, including onions, potatoes and carrots. The town was in the Franklin District until the district's abolition in 2010.

There is the Pukekawa primary school which is located opposite the garage/store. Most of the services, supermarkets, banks, chemist and shops are located at Tuakau some 8 kilometres away and a further 10 km there is Pukekohe which is a thriving New Zealand rural town. The Onewhero Golf Club is listed by newzealand.com as the sole recreational activity in Pukekawa. The former State Highway 22 runs through Pukekawa.

An ancient Maori pā (fortress) lies on the summit of Pukekawa hill. Otherwise Pukekawa shows no signs of pre-European contact Maori settlement. Its name pukekawa (bitter hill) tells why. The hill could not grow the kūmara (sweet potato).

In the 1920s James Cowan described Pukekawa as a "beautiful round green hill on the west side of Waikato".

== History ==
=== The New Zealand Wars ===
From the beginning of the Waikato military campaigns, Ngati Maniapoto made Pukekawa their entrenched headquarters. From Pukekawa they launched raids upon the neighbouring British settlements. From a raid from Pukekawa the British army supply depot Cameron town was raided and burnt to the ground in 1863. A British detachment sent to attack the about one hundred men Maori raiding war party was scattered by gun fire and through the night the soldiers were hunted down in the bush.

=== The Pakeha Peace ===
In a peace agreement with the New Zealand Government in the 1880s, Pukekawa was returned to Ngati Maniapoto. In 1888, the Maori King, Tawhiao, moved there with his followers. By 1892 there were 80–90 Maori houses (whare) on Pukekawa. King Tawhiao's house, a large whare, stood there.

The Maori settlers grew market garden crops, mostly potatoes and maize. Market gardens have been the predominant form of farming in Pukekawa ever since.

Pukekawa became famous by the early 1890s with both Māori and Pakeha for its horse racing and betting. Hundreds of Māori and Pakeha attended the Pukekawa races. The Pukekawa racing cup had the prize of twenty pounds which far eclipsed the neighbouring Pakeha racing cups. From Pukekawa King Tawhiao and his Court made every year regular regal tours through the North Island. King Tawhiao set up in Pukekawa an alternate Māori Government which was not recognised by the Crown nor the New Zealand Government.

=== The Pukekawa Affair ===
In 1890 a detachment of armed soldiers raided Pukekawa and arrested and incarcerated Tawhiao's secretary, Kerei, for the destruction of a surveyor's trig on Pukekawa. Kerei was arrested without resistance in the presence of the Maori King to his distress. King Tawhiao later complained to the New Zealand Government that they had broken the 1880s peace agreement when the Kingites had surrendered all their guns. One account described it as "electioneering tactics".

=== The Pakeha era ===
After Tawhiao's death and sales to Pakeha farmers, by the early 1900s Pukekawa became a Pakeha rural settlement. By 1920 Pukekawa was described as a "typical township of a Post Office, a store and a few buildings".

Pukekawa shared in the Waikato prosperity and later depopulation of the 1950s to 1990s. By 1970 Pukekawa was an affluent rural community and service centre of several hundred people but nationally notorious for the Crewe murders. The community was divided between two feuding camps of Thomas and Crown supporters. To some degree the issue split on class and economic divisions. The film, Beyond Reasonable Doubt, was filmed in Pukekawa with both camps participating in its production.

In the twenty-first century, Pukekawa has again rebirthed as a centre for life style housing. Houses of several hundred thousand and million dollar values are being advertised and sold. An 1850s Auckland colonial villa has been shifted and sold in Pukekawa. Land agents advertise the views to the Waikato river. Farms are being advertised, sold and rented out to urban New Zealanders and foreigners to enjoy the kiwi rural life. Backpacker hostels are listed.

Pukekawa farming has shifted back to market gardening. Pukekawa has gone full circle from Maori horticulture to Pakeha dairying back to horticulture.

=== The Eyre Murder ===
On the night of 24 August 1920 a farmer, Sydney Eyre, was shot in his bedroom in the presence of his wife on his Pukekawa farm. Police found hoof marks and cartridges that led to a former employee on the Eyre farm, Samuel Thorn. Thorn was that year convicted in the Auckland Supreme Court and hanged for murder. Thorn died protesting his innocence. The trial was a national sensation. Eyre's wife confessed in the court that she had been "intimate" with Thorn.

=== The Crewe Murders ===
The murders of Harvey and Jeannette Crewe in their living room on their farm on about 17 June 1970 thrust Pukekawa into the national headlines again. Their bodies were thrown into the Waikato river and found separately many weeks later. A woman never officially identified was observed to be in the Crewe house before the Crewes were reported missing. The Crewe baby Rochelle and the farm animals were fed by an unknown person. Local farmer Arthur Allan Thomas was twice convicted in the Auckland Supreme Court and jailed for the murders. His motives were attributed by the Crown to a passion for Jeannette Crewe. He was found to have been wrongly convicted and was pardoned by the Governor-General on 17 December 1979. He was awarded $1 million compensation. The story was made into a film in 1980 called Beyond Reasonable Doubt.

The Crewe murders continue to divide the district into two feuding camps without apparent closure. Pukekawa water supply contractor, Des Thomas, brother of Arthur, continues to investigate for the murders a local man, "farmer X". The release in July 2014 of a police report on the murders cleared suspects the late Len Demler (father of Jeannette) and his second wife after the murders, Norma Demler. The report implied Arthur Thomas remains a suspect to the police. The police report also said the cartridge case that incriminated Arthur Thomas may have been "fabricated evidence". The murder house is still occupied.

The farm of Arthur Thomas is still owned and farmed by the Thomas family. At its front gate there used to stand a cross that listed "Justice", "free Thomas " supporters and a helpful New Zealand policeman. The cross has been moved into nearby bush and its legend obliterated.

At the local Tuakau cemetery the graves of Arthur Thomas' parents are present. Twenty seven metres away lie the neglected graves of the Crewes. The names of the still alive Arthur Thomas and Rochelle Crewe are both listed on the grave sites.

=== Sweetwaters festivals ===
In the 1980s Pukekawa was listed as the district that staged on a farm three rock and pop Sweetwaters Music Festivals.

== Demographics ==
Pukekawa settlement is two SA1 statistical areas which cover 19.71 km^{2} (7.61 sq mi). The SA1 areas are part of the larger Pukekawa statistical area.

Historical population of Pukekawa settlement and surrounds
Year	Pop.	±% p.a.
2006	222	—
2013	255	+2.00%
2018	294	+2.89%
2023	381	+5.32%

The SA1 areas had a population of 381 in the 2023 New Zealand census, an increase of 87 people (29.6%) since the 2018 census, and an increase of 126 people (49.4%) since the 2013 census. There were 195 males and 183 females in 114 dwellings. 1.6% of people identified as LGBTIQ+. There were 75 people (19.7%) aged under 15 years, 66 (17.3%) aged 15 to 29, 177 (46.5%) aged 30 to 64, and 63 (16.5%) aged 65 or older.

People could identify as more than one ethnicity. The results were 89.0% European (Pākehā); 19.7% Māori; 2.4% Pasifika; 6.3% Asian; and 1.6% Middle Eastern, Latin American and African New Zealanders (MELAA). English was spoken by 97.6%, Māori language by 1.6%, and other languages by 11.0%. No language could be spoken by 1.6% (e.g. too young to talk). The percentage of people born overseas was 19.7, compared with 28.8% nationally.

Religious affiliations were 18.9% Christian, 0.8% Islam, 0.8% Buddhist, and 0.8% other religions. People who answered that they had no religion were 70.1%, and 9.4% of people did not answer the census question.

Of those at least 15 years old, 54 (17.6%) people had a bachelor's or higher degree, 183 (59.8%) had a post-high school certificate or diploma, and 78 (25.5%) people exclusively held high school qualifications. 42 people (13.7%) earned over $100,000 compared to 12.1% nationally. The employment status of those at least 15 was that 171 (55.9%) people were employed full-time and 54 (17.6%) were part-time.

=== Pukekawa statistical area ===
Pukekawa statistical area covers 140.89 km^{2} (54.40 sq mi) and had an estimated population of 1,730 as of June 2025, with a population density of 12 people per km^{2}.

Historical population for the statistical area
Year	Pop.	±% p.a.
2006	1,233	—
2013	1,230	−0.03%
2018	1,476	+3.71%
2023	1,707	+2.95%
Source: source=

Pukekawa had a population of 1,707 in the 2023 New Zealand census, an increase of 231 people (15.7%) since the 2018 census, and an increase of 477 people (38.8%) since the 2013 census. There were 861 males, 837 females and 6 people of other genders in 552 dwellings. 2.5% of people identified as LGBTIQ+. The median age was 42.6 years (compared with 38.1 years nationally). There were 327 people (19.2%) aged under 15 years, 291 (17.0%) aged 15 to 29, 864 (50.6%) aged 30 to 64, and 222 (13.0%) aged 65 or older.

People could identify as more than one ethnicity. The results were 88.8% European (Pākehā); 16.5% Māori; 3.7% Pasifika; 4.6% Asian; 0.7% Middle Eastern, Latin American and African New Zealanders (MELAA); and 1.8% other, which includes people giving their ethnicity as "New Zealander". English was spoken by 96.7%, Māori language by 2.5%, Samoan by 1.1%, and other languages by 9.1%. No language could be spoken by 1.9% (e.g. too young to talk). New Zealand Sign Language was known by 0.7%. The percentage of people born overseas was 17.0, compared with 28.8% nationally.

Religious affiliations were 22.0% Christian, 0.9% Hindu, 0.2% Islam, 0.5% Māori religious beliefs, 0.4% Buddhist, 0.7% New Age, 0.2% Jewish, and 1.1% other religions. People who answered that they had no religion were 65.9%, and 8.4% of people did not answer the census question.

Of those at least 15 years old, 234 (17.0%) people had a bachelor's or higher degree, 831 (60.2%) had a post-high school certificate or diploma, and 309 (22.4%) people exclusively held high school qualifications. The median income was $48,900, compared with $41,500 nationally. 207 people (15.0%) earned over $100,000 compared to 12.1% nationally. The employment status of those at least 15 was that 810 (58.7%) people were employed full-time, 234 (17.0%) were part-time, and 24 (1.7%) were unemployed.

== Education ==
Pukekawa School is a co-educational state primary school, with a roll of 81 as of July 2026. It was founded in 1895.
