= Mākutu =

Māori concept of witchcraft

Mākutu in the Māori language of New Zealand means "witchcraft", "sorcery", "to bewitch"; and also a "spell or incantation". It may also be described as a belief in malignant occult powers possessed by certain people.

An October 2007 mākutu-lifting in the Lower Hutt suburb of Wainuiomata led to the death by drowning of a woman and the hospitalisation of a teen, allegedly due to attempts to remove such a curse.

== See also ==
- Tohunga
