= Lesley Elliott (campaigner) =

New Zealand nurse and campaigner (1946–2022)

Lesley Elliott MNZM
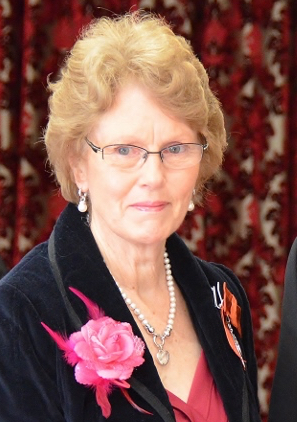
- Elliott in 2015
- Born: Lesley Frances Scott; 27 October 1946; Invercargill, New Zealand
- Died: 20 November 2022 (aged 76); Dunedin, New Zealand
- Occupation: Nurse
- Known for: Campaigning for the prevention of domestic violence
- Spouse: Gil Elliott (m. 1968)
- Children: 3
- Relatives: Sophie Elliott (daughter)

Lesley Frances Elliott MNZM (née Scott; 27 October 1946 – 20 November 2022) was a New Zealand nurse and the founder and chairperson of the Sophie Elliott Foundation, an organisation that educated New Zealanders on the signs of abuse in personal relationships. She was moved to start the work after her daughter Sophie was killed by her former boyfriend in January 2008. She realised that she had been unaware that he was abusive, but that it was possible to identify the signs. In 2019, she closed the Sophie Elliott Foundation as her Parkinson's disease was preventing her from continuing to run the foundation and she did not want another person to control her daughter's image.

== Biography ==
Born Lesley Frances Scott in Invercargill on 27 October 1946, Elliott was the daughter of Eric Prior Scott and Audrey Victoria Scott (née Green). She became engaged to Gilbert Stanley Elliott in 1966, and they married at St Mary's Anglican Church in New Plymouth in 1968. The couple went on to have two sons as well as their daughter Sophie. Towards the end of her life, Elliott suffered from Parkinson's disease and dementia, and she died in Dunedin on 20 November 2022, aged 76.

== Recognition ==
In 2014, Elliott won the Supreme Award at the New Zealand Women of Influence Awards. She also won a Paul Harris Fellowship from Rotary International and the Next Woman of the Year title. In the 2015 Queen's Birthday Honours, she was appointed a Member of the New Zealand Order of Merit, for services to the prevention of domestic violence.

== Publications ==
- Sophie's Legacy – A mother's story of her family's loss and their quest for change, (2011) Lesley Elliott with William J O'Brien, Random House
- Loves Me Not - How to Keep Relationships Safe, (2014) Lesley Elliott with William J O'Brien, Random House
