= Judith Ablett-Kerr =

New Zealand lawyer

Judith Ablett-Kerr ONZM KC
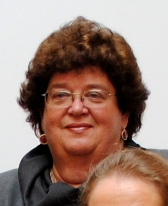
- Ablett-Kerr in 2012
- Born: Judith Mary Ablett; 1946 or 1947 (age 79–80); Wales
- Education: University of London
- Occupations: Criminal defence lawyer King's Counsel

Judith Mary Ablett-Kerr ONZM KC (née Ablett; born 1946 or 1947) is a criminal defence lawyer and King's Counsel in New Zealand.

== Early life and education ==
Ablett-Kerr was born in 1946 or 1947 in Wales and grew up there. Her mother Bessie died when she was eight, and her father Henry raised Ablett-Kerr and her brother. Her father was a lay Baptist preacher and a Conservative politician. Ablett-Kerr joined the Welsh Young Conservatives as a teenager and became the branch chair at the age of 15. She was also a national debating champion in her teenage years.

Ablett-Kerr studied law at the University of London and was admitted to the bar in Cardiff in 1970. She was the second female barrister in Wales.

== Career ==
Ablett-Kerr began her career as a Crown prosecutor in Wales. She emigrated to New Zealand and settled in Dunedin in 1981. She was admitted to the New Zealand bar in 1982. In April 1995, she was appointed a Queen's Counsel, becoming the third female and the first female criminal defence lawyer in New Zealand to be made a QC.

Ablett-Kerr has served as defence lawyer in a number of high-profile cases. In the mid-1990s she and Greg King successfully defended scientist Vicky Calder against charges of attempted murder. She worked for childcare worker Peter Ellis following his conviction in the Christchurch Civic Childcare Centre case, and defended Clayton Weatherston for the murder of Sophie Elliott.

Ablett-Kerr has defended a number of women in domestic violence cases, most notably Gay Oakes, who was convicted for burying her partner in their garden but released on parole in 2002.

In the 2002 Queen's Birthday and Golden Jubilee Honours, Ablett-Kerr was appointed an Officer of the New Zealand Order of Merit, for services to the legal profession.

== Personal life ==
Ablett-Kerr was twice married before moving to New Zealand. She had a son, Rupert, from her first marriage to a London judge, and another son, Edward, from her second marriage to Edward Hampson, an insurance broker. In 1987, she married Lewis Kerr, known as a theatre director in Dunedin, and the couple adopted the surname Ablett-Kerr. Her elder son, Rupert Ablett-Hampson, became a lawyer, and was appointed the deputy chief censor of New Zealand in 2021. Her younger son, Edward Ablett-Hampson, has been a staffer for Murray McCully when he was the minister of foreign affairs, and a principal advisor at the Ministry of Social Development.

Ablett-Kerr's brother, Michael Ablett, was the National Party's candidate in the Dunedin Central electorate at the 1978 general election, but was not elected, finishing second behind the Labour candidate, Brian MacDonell.
