= David Yallop =

British author (1937–2018)

- Born: David Anthony Yallop; 27 January 1937; London, England
- Died: 31 August 2018 (aged 81); London, England
- Occupation: Writer
- Years active: 1965-2010

David Anthony Yallop (27 January 1937 – 23 August 2018) was a British writer known for his work in television, and for his books about crime, corruption, conspiracies and miscarriages of justice.

== Early life ==
Yallop was born in South London, to an English father and Irish mother. He was brought up as a Catholic and served as an altar boy. At age 14, he left school, with the intention of becoming a journalist, and got work as a tea boy in a newspaper office. After completing National Service, he worked as a Studio floor manager, first at Rediffusion then at London Weekend Television. By 1965, he was writing full-time for television.

== Career ==
From 1966, Yallop wrote for several series, including Orlando, Crown Court, The Rolf Harris Show, Doctor on the Go, and Minder. He was also one of the co-authors of Graham Chapman's 1980 autobiography, A Liar's Autobiography (Volume VI).

In 1989, Yallop was fired as a scriptwriter for EastEnders when he proposed killing some of the characters with an IRA bomb. He successfully sued the BBC for breach of contract.

He continued writing for television up until 2010, with his last series being 1995's An Independent Man. He wrote the script for the 1980 docudrama Beyond Reasonable Doubt (based on his own book), the screenplay for the 1990 film Chicago Joe and the Showgirl, and the 2007 television film The Marchioness Disaster. In the 2000s, he appeared in episodes of true crime TV series such as History's Mysteries, Revealed and Real Crime.

In 1971, his first book, about the Derek Bentley case, was published. He wrote an additional nine non-fiction books, and one work of fiction. His best-known book, In God's Name: An Investigation Into the Murder of Pope John Paul I (1984), posited that Pope John Paul I, who was found dead in his chambers soon after becoming pope in 1978, had been poisoned by Masons who had infiltrated the Vatican and the Vatican Bank. Reviewers, and the Roman Catholic Church, dismissed the book as groundless conspiracy theory. The book made the New York Times Best Seller list for 15 weeks, was translated into multiple languages, and was repeatedly reprinted, selling over six million copies.

== Personal life and death ==
Yallop was married twice. He had two daughters with his first wife, Mary Marie Linger who he married in 1957, and one daughter and one son with his second wife, Anna Rutherford, whom he married in 1977. At the end of his life, he developed Alzheimer's disease and died of pneumonia in London on 31 August 2018.

== Books ==
- To Encourage The Others (the Craig/Bentley murder case), W. H. Allen & Co. 1971
- The Day The Laughter Stopped (a biography of Roscoe "Fatty" Arbuckle), St. Martin's Press 1976
- Beyond Reasonable Doubt? (the conviction of New Zealand farmer Arthur Allan Thomas for the murder of Harvey and Jeannette Crewe), Hodder & Stoughton 1979
- Deliver Us From Evil (the Yorkshire Ripper), Macdonald Futura 1981
- In God's Name: An Investigation into the Murder of Pope John Paul I, Bantam Books 1984
- The Power and the Glory: Inside the Dark Heart of Pope John Paul II's Vatican, Carroll & Graf Publishers 1984
- Ratlines (the post-WWII escape of the Nazis with the help of the Vatican), Corgi Books 1984
- To the Ends of the Earth: The Hunt for the Jackal, Random House 1993
- How They Stole the Game (Corruption in FIFA under João Havelange), Poetic Publishing 1999
- Unholy Alliance (fiction), Bantam Books 1999
- Beyond Belief: The Catholic Church and the Child Abuse Scandal, Constable & Robinson 2010
