= Killing of Janet Moses =

Exorcism in New Zealand

On 12 October 2007, 22-year-old Janet Moses died and a 14-year-old female relative was injured during a mākutu lifting (or exorcism) in the Wellington, New Zealand suburb of Wainuiomata. In 2009, nine members of Moses' extended family, all siblings of her mother or their spouses, were charged in relation to the event. One uncle and four aunts were subsequently found guilty of manslaughter.

The mākutu lifting and subsequent trial were notable for bringing mākutu into the public awareness in New Zealand; and the large number of independent people who stepped forward to distance mākutu lifting as they knew it from the events in this case. Unprecedented media attention was paid to mākutu, mākutu lifting and Māori religion.

== Mākutu ==
Mākutu is a Māori language word which can be either a noun or a verb depending on context. It is translated into English by church missionaries as curse, witchcraft or sorcery. (Note: In modern orthography, mākutu is written with a macron where technically possible, but in historical sources and sometimes in modern sources (such as newspapers) with limited technical capabilities it is written without the macron.)

Historically, the tohunga involved in lifting mākutu were suppressed by the Tohunga Suppression Act 1907, which was repealed in 1962.

== Fatal incident ==
In the period prior to the mākutu lifting, Janet Moses had suffered the loss of her grandmother and relationship problems with her partner and father of her two children; the trial would later hear expert testimony that she likely had an "underlying psychiatric or psychological disorder." A concrete lion was stolen from a Greytown hotel by family members, and was to become associated by family members with Moses' behaviour; the family said she was acting like a lion. The family emblem was a lion, with at least one family member having a tattoo of a lion and the words 'Family united' over it.

When they became concerned with her behaviour, Moses' family consulted kaumātua (elder) Timi Rahi, who prayed for her and blessed her, and advised the family to return the lion, which they did. Rahi instructed the family that it was their responsibility to carry out the healing. After Rahi left, a prolonged mākutu lifting was performed by her predominantly maternal family at the Wainuiomata flat of Moses' late grandmother. There was no evidence as to who suggested that Moses was possessed or suffering from a curse, or who suggested that a mākutu lifting was required. The ceremony was improvised, as none of those involved had any knowledge of the procedure for a mākutu lifting. During the ceremony, so much water was used that the carpet had become soaked, and so a small hole in the floor had to be made for drainage. The woman's eyes were injured as people picked at the demons they saw in them, and neighbours heard rhythmic stomping and thumping throughout the night.

At or about 8:00 a.m. on 12 October 2007, Janet Moses died by drowning. Her father, who had travelled from Christchurch through the night to support his daughter, was not informed until his arrival at 4:30 p.m. Nine hours after the death the police were called.

== Trial ==
Much of the trial centred on the issue of consent, that is whether Moses was a willing participant in the ritual. The trial ran for 29 days and involved 101 witnesses, many of them giving testimony relating to cultural and religious practices. The jury deliberated for 20 hours before finding five of the eight maternal family members guilty of manslaughter (another family member was discharged by the judge mid-trial).

None of the convicted family members received custodial sentences, the judge instead handing down community-based sentences.

At the trial, Charlie Moses (Janet's paternal grandfather) took a stance supporting the defendants: "We've made our peace with them. They didn't know what they were doing, even though I told them not to go down that road. They chose to do it anyway. For that mistake ... they're going to pay for the rest of their lives. I wish them well all the same."

As is common in New Zealand court cases, a number of those connected to the case have name suppression to prevent the identification of under-age victims.

The eventual coroner's inquest strongly recommended that the family consult tohunga (experts) or experienced kaumatua (elders) before taking action on suspected mākutu. Both Pou Temara, professor of Māori language and traditions at Waikato University, and Rawiri Taonui, head of Canterbury University's School of Maori and Indigenous Studies, said that the advice was sensible and that Māori would continue mākutu lifting practices.

== See also ==
- Mike Antunovic
- Death of Joanna Lee
