= Ian Wishart (journalist) =

New Zealand journalist (born 1964)

Ian Wishart (born 1964) is a New Zealand journalist, author and publisher, and the editor of Investigate magazine. He is a conservative Christian, an opponent of the scientific consensus on climate change, and has been described as a "professional controversialist".

== Early career ==
Wishart went to Onslow College, and studied journalism at Wellington Polytechnic, graduating in 1982. He has worked for Radio Windy, Radio Hauraki, Radio Pacific, TV3 and Television New Zealand.

== Winebox affair ==
In 1992, New Zealand politician Winston Peters began raising a series of allegations in Parliament about prominent business leaders trying to bribe politicians. Wishart was assigned by the TV3 network to report on the case, and came into possession of some confidential business transaction papers that became popularly known as "The Winebox documents" because they had first turned up in an old wine carton.

The documents detailed extensive tax avoidance and tax evasion schemes run through Cook Islands offshore companies associated with an entity part owned by the New Zealand Government state bank, the Bank of New Zealand, and merchant bank Fay Richwhite, whose principals Sir Michael Fay and David Richwhite were closely connected to both the Labour and National political parties.

Although Winston Peters and other financial journalists and newspapers also had copies of the Winebox documents, it was Wishart who first identified the key "Magnum" and "JIF" transactions, later confirmed by the Privy Council and the New Zealand Court of Appeal to be prima facie criminal fraud. against the revenues of New Zealand and Japan respectively.

Wishart continued working on the project as a special investigation for TVNZ, to be carried out in secret with the assistance of Frontline journalist Michael Wilson and producers Carol Hirschfeld and Mark Champion. The documentary was originally scheduled to air in December 1993, but was prevented from going to air by TVNZ management after the intervention of the TVNZ board of directors. Wishart and his colleagues decided to leak details of the banned programme to other news media, turning the blackout into a public issue.

The network was enjoined to an injunction forbidding broadcast of the programme, but the leak of further information made the gagging writ worthless and the documentary finally aired in June 1994 as a special primetime two-hour broadcast. The revelations forced the establishment of a Royal Commission of Inquiry into the Winebox transactions. A senior Inland Revenue Department investigator, Tony Loo, subsequently told the Commission of Inquiry that he and other IRD staff did not understand how the transactions had worked until they watched Wishart's documentary on TV.

Although the Commission report initially exonerated the transactions, the Commission findings were overturned by New Zealand's highest court which found the transactions were prima facie fraudulent and that the commission had made substantial errors in finding otherwise. Ian Wishart published three books detailing his investigations and the outcome: The Paradise Conspiracy (Howling at the Moon, 1995), The Vintage Winebox Guide (Howling at the Moon, 1996), and The Paradise Conspiracy 2 (Howling at the Moon, 1999).

Part of Wishart's first book, The Paradise Conspiracy, was loosely reworked as a feature film, Spooked, starring Cliff Curtis and directed by Geoff Murphy.

== Post-TV career ==
After leaving TVNZ, Wishart covered the Winebox enquiry for the National Business Review, the Waikato Times, the Evening Post, the Christchurch Press and other daily newspapers. He has also written for the New Zealand Herald, The Sunday Star-Times and Metro magazine. In 1997 he was named as the host of the New Zealand version of reality series Real TV, which screened on the TV3 network. In 2000, Wishart began hosting talk radio shifts on the Radio Pacific network, eventually becoming the regular evening host in the 7-10 slot. On one occasion he broadcast the phone numbers of Green Party MPs and urged his listeners to make protest calls, jamming the party's phone lines. Around this time, Wishart became a born-again Christian.

=== Publishing operations ===
Wishart established his own publishing company, Howling at the Moon, in 1995. A subsidiary company was established in 1999 to publish the monthly Investigate magazine.

Wishart is the editor of Investigate magazine, which addresses controversial current affairs issues from a conservative Christian editorial standpoint. It drew mainstream attention for articles critical of policies and members of the centre-left Fifth Labour Government of New Zealand, particularly the interview with former Cabinet Minister John Tamihere, which ended his prospects of a return to Cabinet.

Howling at the Moon has published 15 of Wishart's books, as well as books by other authors, mostly general non-fiction/current affairs titles.

Wishart's books are listed in full below. They include:

- Eve's Bite (2007) The book argues that New Zealand society is being "poisoned" and the Western world as a whole undermined "by seductive and destructive philosophies and social engineering that within the space of a generation have intellectually crippled the greatest civilisation the world has ever seen".
- The Divinity Code, (2007), a pro-creationist response to the atheist arguments of Richard Dawkins and Christopher Hitchens.
- Absolute Power (2008), concerning Helen Clark's years as prime minister.
- Air Con (2009) The book argues that man-made climate change is not significant against the scale of natural forces, and that climate change is being used primarily as a revenue-generating exercise by "the climate-industrial complex".
- Arthur Allan Thomas: The Inside Story (2010), reviewing the murders of Harvey and Jeannette Crewe. In it, Wishart presented new evidence on the role of a police officer, Detective Lenrick Johnston, and suggested he may have been the killer of the South Auckland farmers.
- The Great Divide (2012), which argues that some of New Zealand's earliest residents might have arrived before the Polynesians.

In November 2011, Wishart published the book The Hunt, co-authored with George London, chronicling the search for two children kidnapped off a London street in 1981 and never seen again. The day the book was published, one of the children made contact with their mother for the first time in 30 years. Lindsay Smallbone, the former husband of George London's wife, sued the authors for defamation in 2013 over the book's description of Mr Smallbone as sexually perverse, voyeuristic and otherwise deviant. The jury found that the material was published recklessly, and awarded NZ$270,000 in damages. The win was short-lived however. On the next working day the judge recalled the verdict and eventually ordered a full retrial after overturning the jury decision. Smallbone appealed to the Court of Appeal and then the Supreme Court but lost both appeals.

Five of Wishart's books—The Paradise Conspiracy, Lawyers, Guns & Money, The Paradise Conspiracy II, Absolute Power and Air Con—have achieved number one bestseller status on the NZ Booksellers national "Bestsellers" list, while several more-Daylight Robbery, The Vintage Winebox Guide, Ben & Olivia, Eve's Bite and Arthur Allan Thomas-reached No.2 on the list.

=== Climate skepticism ===
In November 2009 Wishart became involved in the "Climategate" controversy when he obtained confirmation that leaked emails from the University of East Anglia's Climatic Research Unit were genuine, after reaching CRU's Phil Jones by phone. Wishart published stories on both the Investigate magazine blogsite "The Briefing Room" and in the online newspaper TGIF Edition confirming the authenticity of the emails, which formed the basis for other news reports on the developing story worldwide.

In mid June 2025, the New Zealand Media Council upheld some elements of a complaint by Wishart against a Radio New Zealand story published in February 2025 entitled "Hamilton's run of hot days shattered previous records." While Wishart's complaints about alleged breaches of journalism standards, accuracy and fairness were not upheld, the Council agreed that the headline breached "Principle (6) on Headlines and Captions." Wishart had challenged climate scientist Dr Luke Harrington's remark that the hot weather exceeded anything that Hamilton had experienced; contending that the average maximum temperature in the 2025 heatwave (28.5 Celsius) was lower than the 1934-1935 heatwave average of 30.28 Celsius.

== Personal life ==
Wishart has married twice, and has children from his first and second marriages. He and his second wife, Heidi, are Anglicans, Wishart having formerly been an atheist. He is also a proponent of intelligent design.

== Bibliography ==
All published by Howling at the Moon Publishing Ltd unless otherwise stated:

- The Paradise Conspiracy (1995) ISBN 0-473-03397-6
- Ian Wishart’s vintage winebox guide (1996) ISBN 0-9583568-0-7
- Lawyers, Guns & Money (1997) ISBN 095835684X
- An Irish Legacy: The Real Danny Butler Story (1998) ISBN 978-0958371728
- The Paradise Conspiracy II (1999) ISBN 0-9582054-0-X
- Ben & Olivia : what really happened? (1999) ISBN 0-9582054-4-2
- The God Factor (1999) ISBN 0-9582054-2-6
- Beating Big Brother: how people power turned off the TV tax! The Anti TV Licence Campaign (2000) ISBN 0-9582054-8-5
- Daylight robbery : the rise and fall of the "people’s bank" (2001) ISBN 0-9582054-6-9
- Eve's Bite (2007) ISBN 978-0-9582401-1-6
- The Divinity Code (2007) ISBN 978-0958240123
- Absolute Power: The Helen Clark Years (2008) ISBN 978-0958240130
- Air Con (2009) ISBN 978-0-9582401-4-7
- Air Con: Climategate Edition (2010) ISBN 978-0958240161
- Arthur Allan Thomas: The Inside Story (September 2010) ISBN 978-0-9582401-7-8
- Breaking Silence: The Kahui Case (2011) ISBN 978-0987657305
- The Great Divide: The Story of New Zealand & Its Treaty, (2012) ISBN 978-0987657367
- Vitamin D: Is This The Miracle Vitamin? (August 2012) ISBN 978-0987657312
- Missing Pieces: The Swedish Tourists' Murders (December 2012) ISBN 978-0987657374
- Totalitaria: What If The Enemy Is The State? (2013) ISBN 978-0987657350
- Winston: The Story of a political phenomenon, (2014) ISBN 978-0994106414
- Elementary: The Explosive File on Scott Watson and the Disappearance of Ben & Olivia - What Haven't They Told You? (2016) ISBN 9780994106469
