= Murder of Sophie Elliott =

2008 murder case in New Zealand

Sophie Elliott
- Born: Sophie Kate Elliott; 11 June 1985
- Died: 9 January 2008 (aged 22); Dunedin, New Zealand
- Cause of death: Blood loss as result of stabbing
- Education: University of Otago
- Parent(s): Gil and Lesley Elliott

Clayton Weatherston
- Born: Clayton Robert Weatherston; 9 January 1976 (age 50)
- Occupation: University economics lecturer
- Criminal charge: Murder
- Criminal penalty: Life imprisonment with 18 years non-parole period
- Criminal status: In prison

On 9 January 2008, 22-year-old Sophie Kate Elliott (born 11 June 1985) was stabbed to death by ex-boyfriend Clayton Robert Weatherston (born 9 January 1976), in Dunedin, New Zealand. The crime and trial were covered extensively in the news media, and contributed to the government abolishing the partial defence of provocation in cases of murder.

== Murder ==
Elliott and Weatherston had a romantic relationship which lasted around six months and ended before her death. In court, witnesses described the relationship as troubled. Weatherston had been an economics lecturer at the University of Otago, and also taught Elliott, who completed an honours degree in economics. On the day she died, she was packing to relocate to Wellington the next day, and start a job at the New Zealand Treasury.

At around 12:30 pm on 9 January 2008, Sophie Elliott and her mother Lesley were at the family home in the suburb of Ravensbourne northeast of the city centre when Weatherston arrived unannounced, saying he had a farewell present. A short time later Lesley heard her daughter screaming. A New Zealand Police officer, Constable John Cunningham, responding to a 111 call from Lesley found Weatherston locked in Sophie's bedroom. When asked what he had done, he told the officer "I killed her". He was then arrested and taken into custody.

Forensic pathologist Martin Sage performed the autopsy the next day, and found Elliott died from blood loss. Two wounds pierced her heart and one lung, with other wounds to her neck and throat severing the main artery and the major vein. In total she received 216 separate injuries, mostly stab wounds from a knife blade, with some inflicted by scissors. Additionally there were seven blunt force injuries. The pathologist found some defensive wounds, and that the attack targeted aspects of beauty and was intended to disfigure.

== Trial ==
At the end of a week-long depositions hearing during May 2008 in the Dunedin High Court, Weatherston pleaded not guilty and was committed for trial by two justices of the peace. The trial moved to the Christchurch High Court for suppressed reasons, and was scheduled to start on 22 June 2009. Weatherston was represented by Judith Ablett-Kerr QC, who argued a defence of provocation. The knife used in the attack came from Weatherston's kitchen; the defence stated he carried it concealed all the time for self-defence. Two psychiatrists also appeared for the defence, stating he had narcissistic personality disorder.

After a five-week trial the jury returned a verdict of guilty on 22 July, and on 15 September Justice Judith Potter sentenced Weatherston to life imprisonment with a minimum non-parole period of 18 years, saying she believed the killing was deliberate and controlled. The news media in November 2009 revealed that the victim impact statement of Sophie Elliott's father had been censored at the request of the judge, preventing him from addressing some of the claims Weatherston made during the trial.

== Appeal and aftermath ==
On 13 October 2009, Weatherston's lawyers filed an appeal, claiming there was a "lynch mob" mentality over his actions.

On 7 April 2011, Weatherston's lawyer Robert Lithgow QC appealed the 2009 verdict before the Court of Appeal on seven grounds, including that Weatherston did not receive a fair trial due to widespread media coverage, with the magazine Listener attacking the provocation defence. Lithgow also argued that comments made by Law Commission deputy president Warren Young unduly influenced the Christchurch jury, and challenged the use of photographs of the wounds Weatherston inflicted on Elliott as exhibits.

Crown prosecutor Cameron Mander opposed these arguments, pointing out that the jury had been directed to ignore media coverage of the case and that Young's attack on provocation could not be linked specifically to the Elliott murder. Elliott's parents and Sensible Sentencing Trust spokesman Garth McVicar also criticised the appeal.

Three Court of Appeal judges reviewed the 2009 trial and verdict, and on 17 June 2011 denied the appeal on all seven grounds. They said that Justice Potter had directed the jury sufficiently to ignore media coverage, and that the use of the photographs did not undermine the trial's fairness.

Weatherston sought leave of the Supreme Court to appeal the Court of Appeal's denial, but it rejected this on 13 September 2011.

In January 2026, Weatherston was denied parole. He appeared in front of the Parole Board for an hour-long hearing during which he informed the Board that he was not seeking parole at this time. He will next be eligible to apply for parole in November 2027.

== Sophie Elliott Foundation ==
On 6 October 2010, the Sophie Elliott Foundation was launched. The aim of the foundation was to warn and educate young women of the signs of an abusive relationship. One of the trustees was Kristin Dunne-Powell, who suffered abuse at the hands of high-profile sports presenter Tony Veitch. The foundation's main aim was to raise money to fund a nationwide primary prevention programme and to support local community initiatives which aligned with the foundation. On 10 June 2011, Elliott's parents launched the book Sophie’s Legacy—A Mother's Story of Her Family's Loss and Their Quest For Change to present her side of the story while warning young women of the dangers of domestic violence. In 2013, the foundation partnered up with the New Zealand Police and Ministry of Social Development to develop a one-day workshop for Year 12 students named Loves-Me-Not, to educate students on healthy relationships and prevent abusive relationships.

In 2019, Elliott's mother Lesley Elliott closed the foundation, stating that her Parkinson's disease prevented her from continuing to run the foundation, and that she did not want another person controlling her daughter's image. As of 2021, the New Zealand Police continue to run the Loves-Me-Not workshop in high schools.
