= Ellen France =

New Zealand jurist (born 1958)

The Honourable Dame Ellen France DNZM
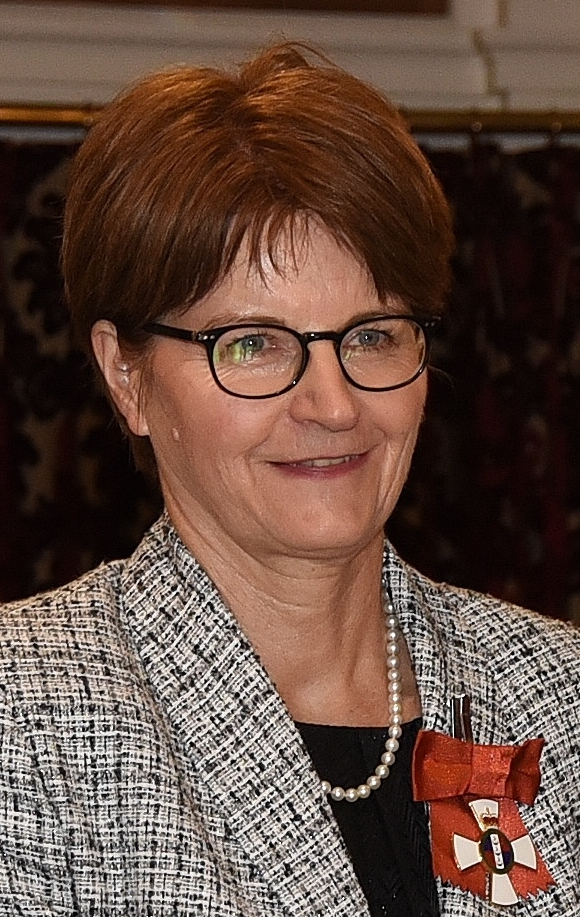
- France in 2016

Justice of the Supreme Court
- Incumbent
- Assumed office 22 July 2016
- Preceded by: Sir John McGrath

President of the Court of Appeal
- In office 2014–2016
- Preceded by: Sir Mark O'Regan
- Succeeded by: Stephen Kós

Personal details
- Born: Ellen Dolour Larkin; 1958 (age 67–68)
- Spouse: Simon France
- Education: University of Auckland; Queen's University

Dame Ellen Dolour France DNZM (née Larkin; born 1958) is a New Zealand jurist. She is currently a justice of the Supreme Court to which she was appointed in 2016, and was previously the president of the Court of Appeal.

== Biography ==
Ellen Dolour Larkin was born to parents who were both teachers. She graduated LLB from the University of Auckland in 1981, and obtained her Master of Laws degree from Queen's University in Ontario, Canada, in 1983. From 1982, she worked as a solicitor for the Auckland practice of Subritzky, Tetley Jones & Way.

From 1984, France was a legal adviser in the Department of Justice Law Reform Division, followed by work for the Crown Law Office.

In 2002, France was appointed to the High Court in Auckland. She received her appointment as a judge to the Court of Appeal in June 2006. She was appointed president of the Court of Appeal of New Zealand with effect from 1 September 2014, succeeding Sir Mark O'Regan. She made history in August 2015 when the Appeal Court bench was made up by three women when she sat with Justice Christine French and Justice Helen Winkelmann.

In the 2016 Queen's Birthday Honours, France was appointed a Dame Companion of the New Zealand Order of Merit, for services to the judiciary.

France's late husband, Simon France, was a judge of the Court of Appeal until just prior to his death in 2023. They met in their first year at Auckland University Law School in the late 1970s.
