= Beyond Reasonable Doubt (1980 film) =

- DVD cover
- Directed by: John Laing
- Written by: David Yallop
- Based on: Beyond Reasonable Doubt; 1970 novel by David Yallop
- Produced by: John Barnett
- Starring: David Hemmings; John Hargreaves; Tony Barry; Martyn Sanderson
- Cinematography: Alun Bollinger
- Edited by: Michael Horton
- Music by: Dave Fraser
- Release date: 1980
- Running time: 129 minutes
- Country: New Zealand
- Language: English
- Box office: $350,000

Beyond Reasonable Doubt is a 1980 New Zealand docu-drama feature film directed by John Laing and starring David Hemmings, John Hargreaves, Roy Billing, and Terence Cooper.

== Plot synopsis ==
Arthur Allan Thomas is falsely convicted for the murder of Harvey and Jeannette Crewe and is later pardoned after 9 years in prison.

== Cast ==
- David Hemmings as Inspector Bruce Hutton
- Bruce Allpress as Detective Sam Keith
- John Hargreaves as Arthur Allan Thomas
- Tony Barry as Detective John Hughes
- Martyn Sanderson as Len Demler
- Terence Cooper as Paul Temm
- Roy Billing as Court Official
- John Bach
- Marshall Napier as Wyllie
- Bruno Lawrence as Pat Vesey
- Roy Billing as Court Official

== Reception ==
The film was the second highest-grossing New Zealand film in New Zealand at the time with a gross of $350,000, behind Sleeping Dogs (1977).

The film received mixed reviews which has largely been attributed to its avoidance of genre clichés. The film did receive praise when it screened at the 1981 Chicago International Film Festival, with director John Laing recalling that "the audience was passionate". The film also received praise from Roger Ebert in the Chicago Sun Times where he described it as a "remarkable film".

In New Zealand the film was well received with Punch stating that it "inspires respect" and suggesting that the film "stirs [hope] that New Zealand may be about to join the cinema producing countries". Due to the high-profile nature of the case in New Zealand the film was described as a "story that a lot of people in the country wanted to forget about". In spite of this the film was New Zealand's most successful film until the release of Goodbye Pork Pie the following year.
