= Death of Joanna Lee =

Joanna Lee (also known as Keum Ok Lee; c. 1963 – 9 December 2000) (Note: The majority of sources accept her date of death as 9 December, although one states 10 December.) was a South Korean woman who died in December 2000 in Auckland, New Zealand, during a prolonged and violent exorcism carried out by Luke Lee (also known as Yong Bum Lee, no relation to the victim), pastor of "Lord of All", a small Christian sect. In 2001, Pastor Lee was convicted of her manslaughter. In 2006, his conviction was overturned by New Zealand's Court of Appeal and a retrial ordered but, by that time, he had already been deported to South Korea.

== Background ==
Luke Lee (born c. 1963) was a South Korean national who had converted to Christianity at about the time he first entered New Zealand on a student visa in 1994. On returning to South Korea to "face his past", he served a prison sentence there for fraud and defaulting on military service. Despite his criminal convictions, in 1999 he was granted another student visa to re-enter New Zealand, where he became a pastor with the Assembly of God and established his own church in Auckland called Lord of All. Lee's church was estimated to have about 30-50 members.

Few details are known about the early life of Joanna Lee. She was described as having suffered personal problems such as the divorce of her parents and several suicide attempts. She also had vitiligo, a skin condition which, "according to [Luke] Lee's evidence made her feel depressed". She reportedly first met Luke Lee in South Korea in 1999 and decided to visit him in New Zealand. Having been accepted into the Lord of All sect, she flew to Auckland in October 2000 on a three-month visitor permit with a return ticket.

== Fatal exorcism ==
In early December 2000, Pastor Lee determined that Joanna Lee was possessed by "at least 20 demons". On 8 December, Pastor Lee began an exorcism at a hall rented by his church in Auckland. The following day the exorcism moved to his rental home in the suburb of Mount Roskill. Over the next six hours, in the presence of a small group of worshippers, he sat on her chest and abdomen, "bounced" on her body, broke several bones, and finally strangled her with his hands. Pastor Lee later said he was "not sure" that Joanna had died, and instructed his followers to videotape her corpse to document her expected resuscitation. Her decomposing body was found by police in Pastor's Lee's home on 15 December, after a visitor to the house raised the alarm. She had been dead for one week, leading the worshippers to clean her body with alcohol in an attempt to remove the odour of decomposition.

No friends or relatives could be contacted to claim Lee's body or make funeral arrangements. In mid-2001, the Auckland Korean community performed a Christian funeral service for her and her body was cremated. As of late 2001 her ashes were still unclaimed.

== Trial and appeal ==
Pastor Lee was subsequently charged with manslaughter in relation to Joanna Lee's death. He represented himself in court and took little part in the trial, speaking only to deliver a closing message. However, he predicted that Joanna Lee would "rise from the dead" during his trial. In December 2001 he was found guilty and sentenced to six years imprisonment. In January 2005, he was deported from New Zealand to South Korea, at which time he was in the process of appealing his conviction. In April 2006, the Court of Appeal overturned his conviction and ordered a retrial. The Court stated that Joanna Lee's possible consent to the exorcism had not been properly considered during the first trial. However, as Pastor Lee and most of the surviving witnesses had left New Zealand, Crown prosecutors determined it would be difficult to arrange a retrial. A bench warrant was issued for Lee's arrest should he return to New Zealand, at which point a retrial may take place.

== See also ==
- Killing of Janet Moses
