= Murders of Gene and Eugene Thomas =

Murders in New Zealand

The murders of Gene and Eugene Thomas occurred in Wellington, New Zealand on 16 February 1994. Eugene, 68, and his son Gene, 30, were millionaire money lenders and owners of Invincible House at 136 The Terrace in Wellington. John Barlow was a business acquaintance and made an appointment, documented in five different diaries, to meet them in their office around 6:00 pm on 16 February, 1994. He arrived at about 5:45 pm. The bodies of the victims were discovered in their offices at around 6:30 pm by two cleaners. Both had been shot twice in the head.

The police interviewed Barlow twice and he gave them two different versions of what happened. In the second version, he said the Thomases were already dead when he got there. Police recruited a friend of Barlow's that he had previously confided in to secretly record conversations hoping to obtain further information. Barlow was arrested 18 weeks later. The first two trials ended in hung juries. At the third trial in 1995, an FBI agent gave testimony claiming that lead content tests he conducted proved bullets from the crime scene matched those in a box of bullets belonging to Barlow that he threw away at the Happy Valley landfill the day after the murders. A third trial was held, and Barlow was found guilty.

By 2005, this testing procedure was abandoned by the FBI due to its unreliability. In 2008, based on this issue, Barlow appealed to the Privy Council in Britain for his convictions to be overturned. The Council agreed the FBI evidence was unreliable, but still upheld the convictions based on "overwhelming" circumstantial evidence - although the Council also noted that "no possible reason why he should have wanted to murder them has ever been suggested".

Barlow is the only New Zealander to be tried three times for the same crime raising concerns about due process and human rights in the New Zealand justice system. He was released on parole in August 2010, after serving 15 years in prison, still proclaiming his innocence.

== The Investigation ==
John Barlow and Eugene Thomas were both members of Wellington's Wellesley Club, drank together occasionally and had known each other for years. In the 1980s, Barlow had invested $85,000 in the Thomas' superannuation fund and in 1992, borrowed $70,000 against it. At the time of the murders, the Thomases owed Barlow about $10,000. Barlow was also a gun enthusiast who owned 18 guns, six of which were unlicensed pistols.

When police arrived at the murder scene, the diary on Eugene's Thomas desk had pages ripped out, but his pocket diary revealed the scheduled appointment with John Barlow for 6 pm on the day of the murders.

=== Barlow's first statement ===
Detectives interviewed Barlow on the afternoon of 17 February, the day after the murders. He told police he had arranged the after-hours meeting to make a business proposal to the Thomases regarding their business in reverse annuity mortgages. He said that upon arriving at the Thomases' office at around 5:45 pm, the older Thomas was in a meeting with someone else and he was asked to wait. He waited for a while, but left after about 25 minutes as the Thomases were still busy with this other person.

When he was halfway home, Barlow changed his mind and returned to the office to try and talk to the Thomases about his business idea. He arrived back at their office at around 6:25 pm, but still wasn't able to see them. He said he was told to call back in the morning. He said he saw an Asian boy cleaning the steps on the way out, and they said hello to one another. He told his wife the same story.

=== Barlow's second statement ===
The following evening, 18 February, Barlow presented himself at the Wellington Central Police station to volunteer a second statement. He now claimed that when he returned to the office, he saw that both men had been shot - Gene's body was on the floor in the reception area, and Eugene's body in the boardroom. He said he did not touch either of the bodies and left immediately, saying hello to the Asian cleaner on his way out at about 6:35 pm. He said he did not tell the police everything in his first statement because he was in "extreme shock" and fearful of being blamed.

=== Search of Happy Valley landfill ===
The police were sceptical of Barlow's statements. They searched Barlow's house and his car, and found a receipt from the Happy Valley rubbish landfill dated 17 February. Barlow had not mentioned this trip to the landfill in either of his statements to the police.

The police searched the landfill and discovered a CZ-27 Czech made pistol belonging to Barlow, as well as holster and a homemade silencer that had been cut into pieces, some Geco brand .32 bullets and an envelope with John Barlow's name and address on it. It was determined that the pistol had been fitted with a homemade .22 barrel in place of the usual .32 calibre barrel, although the .32 calibre barrel was never recovered.

=== Secret witness recordings ===
Before Barlow was interviewed by the police, he called a long-term friend, and told him about finding the bodies and that he was likely to be the prime suspect. This associate contacted the police and became a secret witness at Barlow's trials. He agreed to wear a hidden microphone to record conversations with Barlow in the hope he might make incriminating statements.

During these recorded conversations, Barlow's version of events stayed the same as his second statement to police but with one additional factor: Barlow said that several months earlier he had lent the CZ-27 pistol to Thomas Senior, as Thomas had confided in him that he feared his life was being threatened. (At the first trial, Thomas' daughter, Diane, who worked as property manager for her father, confirmed that he had been threatened by a man named Evans.)

Barlow also lent Thomas the homemade silencer so that he would be able to try out the gun discreetly the next time he was out of town. Barlow told the secret witness that when he found the Thomases dead that day, he was shocked to see his gun lying there on the floor. Fearing that the weapon would be traced to him and that he would be blamed for the murders, he seized it and disposed of it the following morning.

Barlow said nothing in these recorded conversations that would constitute an admission of guilt. Despite an extensive examination of his clothing and effects by the police, no traces of blood were found, except on the briefcase that he had taken with him to the meeting. However, the blood was not identified as belonging to either of the Thomases.

== First murder trial ==
Barlow was arrested on 23 June 1994, about 18 weeks after the killings. His first trial began at the Wellington High Court on 29 May 1995. It lasted three weeks. Barlow pleaded not guilty to the charge of double murder.

=== Prosecution's case ===
The prosecution's case was that Barlow went to the meeting with the Thomases that was arranged for 5:30 pm on Wednesday, 16 February. It was not known for certain what the purpose of this meeting was. The meeting was entered into five diaries and was known to a number of people. The prosecution said that the shootings took place after the meeting had been underway for an hour. Barlow's fingerprints were found on a writing pad on the boardroom table. It was disputed as to whether these prints were deposited whilst Barlow was tearing pages from the notepad. The page for 16 February had also been torn out of Thomas Senior's diary. The prosecution alleged that was to destroy evidence of his appointment.

=== CZ-27 pistol ===
Central to the prosecution's case was that the CZ-27 pistol Barlow disposed of at the landfill was the murder weapon. It was presumed a silencer was attached as no one in the vicinity reported hearing any shots. When the gun was found, Barlow had removed the barrel and disposed of it. He had also filed down the firing pin and cartridge case extractor claws as well as substituting the original magazine with a homemade one. The prosecution alleged that Barlow made these alterations in an attempt to prevent the identification of the CZ-27 pistol as the murder weapon.

Peter Wilson, a forensic scientist from the Institute of Environmental Science and Research (ESR) testified that he compared the crime scene bullets with the bullets that Barlow had thrown away at the landfill and concluded that they matched. One of the crime scene bullets was also sent to the Geco ammunition company in Germany, where a computer test confirmed not only was the bullet a Geco brand bullet, but that it was chemically identical to one of the bullets taken from the box of ammunition that Barlow had disposed of at the landfill. However, one of the police witnesses said there were 52 different makes of firearms that could have fired the bullets found at the scene.

=== Defence's case ===
The defence produced a handful of witnesses who said they saw a man on the Terrace acting suspiciously around the time of the murders. Two of those witnesses said the man they saw had a shoulder holster for a gun. The defence suggested that the Thomases were murdered by this unidentified person who used a different weapon, probably a revolver, as no cartridges were found at the crime scene. Counsel argued that the police focussed entirely on Barlow from the start of their investigation, and never seriously explored these or any other lines of inquiry.

The defence contended that although Barlow's gun had been found at the crime scene, it was not the murder weapon. They argued that Thomas Senior had attempted to use it to defend himself - he was found to have residue on his hands containing metallic elements, consistent with having fired or handled a weapon in the three hours before his death.

The defence also pointed out that there was nothing that physically connected Barlow with the killing and despite having tested Barlow's wardrobe, his car, his watch and his eyeglasses – a total of 180 articles – scientists did not find anything that linked him to the homicides. The defence said that Barlow's prints indicated nothing more than that he had been in the room – something that Barlow himself had admitted. A motive for the murders was not suggested by the prosecution, and although Barlow had taken out a loan of about $70,000 with the Thomases, there was nothing to suggest he was not in a position to repay it.

The defence also pointed out that if Barlow had indeed killed the Thomases, he must have taken the pistol with him with the intention of using it. If so, it made little sense to make an appointment which was documented in five different diaries in the Thomas' offices. After deliberating for two and a half days, the jury was unable to reach a unanimous decision.

== Second murder trial ==
Barlow's second trial began on 24 July 1995. In this trial the defence presented Robert Barnes, an expert from Melbourne, Australia, to challenge the prosecution. He testified that the bullets which came from Thomas Senior's body did not necessarily come from the CZ-27, but could have come from a large number of similar weapons. He also questioned whether the cut-up silencer had been used. Most other aspects of Barlow's second trial were substantially the same as the first trial.

On 25 August, the jury retired to consider its verdict. After deliberating for two days this jury was also unable to reach a unanimous verdict.

== Third murder trial ==
Barlow's third trial began on 24 October 1995. During this trial, the prosecution presented an FBI expert, Charles Peters, whose test results showed that one murder bullet was unique and that the other three matched some of the bullets found at the landfill. Peters agreed with prosecutors that the compositions of three of the murder bullets were "analytically indistinguishable" from 14 of the landfill bullets. He furthermore stated that the crime scene bullets came from "the same box or a box manufactured on or, manufactured or loaded on or about," the same date as the landfill bullets. The defence once again presented Robert Barnes who disputed these findings. Peters rejected the criticism.

Jury deliberations began on 20 November 1995. After 27 hours of deliberation, the jury found John Barlow guilty of double murder. Barlow was sentenced to life imprisonment with a non-parole period of 14 years.

== Appeals ==
Barlow appealed his convictions in August 1996. His lawyers argued that the third trial was intrinsically unfair under the Bill of Rights; that there were issues of non-disclosure of evidence; and that the trial judge had minimized the importance of the ballistics evidence which was at the heart of their defence argument in his summing up. Barlow's appeal was dismissed.

In 2006, the Governor General refused to grant Barlow a royal pardon.

=== Privy Council ===
In July 2008, Barlow's lawyer, Greg King, took the case to the Privy Council, who ruled to hear his appeal against conviction. This appeal centred on FBI expert Charles Peters' testimony. Peters evidence was based on lead content tests which were used to match crime scene bullets with those in a box belonging to Barlow. However, by 2005, the FBI had stopped using this technique after it was found to produce a high rate of false matches of bullets. Barlow's lawyer, Greg King, told the Privy council that the FBI were no longer using this test and have notified the authorities of the problem in 300 cases in which this type of evidence had been used.

King also pointed out that this 'evidence' from the FBI was not presented at the first two trials in which the juries were unable to reach verdicts. King argued that Peters' evidence was flawed and that his position as an FBI agent may have overly impressed the jury and influenced the weight they gave his testimony at the third trial. An affidavit by Dr. Rick Randich, a metallurgist, also gave the opinion that, although the lead composition of the crime scene bullets was consistent with the Geco ammunition recovered from the landfill, it was impossible to say for certain if they were actually Geco bullets, as Peters had done.

The Privy Council concluded that the FBI evidence was "unscientific and untenable", but said the circumstantial evidence against Barlow was "overwhelming". His appeal was dismissed.

== Release from prison ==
The Parole Board declined to release Barlow three times. On his fourth appearance, after spending more than 15 years in jail, he was paroled from Rimutaka prison in August 2010. He said his time in prison was "like going into retirement" and hasn't changed him a bit.

He returned to live with his wife in Pukerua Bay. Barlow continues to maintain his innocence, and said his daughter had written a book about his experience of the justice sysytem. He added that the unwavering support he received from his wife and family while in prison enabled him to survive the psychological impact.

While in prison, he helped mentor other inmates. One of those was Paul Wood who had been convicted of murder and went on acquire a PhD in psychology. Wood credits Barlow with transforming his life. On release, Barlow remains passionate about the importance of education for prisoners, many of whom are illiterate, and says prisons need dedicated study units.

== Citations ==
=== References ===
- McLean, Fred (1998). Will to kill: The Barlow trial and other notable New Zealand murders. IPL Books. ISBN 0-908876-02-5.
- Bruce, Bryan (2008). Hard Cases. Random House New Zealand. ISBN 978-1-86941-977-6.
- The Thomas Murders (1 of 5) YouTube
- The Thomas Murders (2 of 5) YouTube
- The Thomas Murders (3 of 5) YouTube
- The Thomas Murders (4 of 5) YouTube
- The Thomas Murders (5 of 5) YouTube
