= Crime in New Zealand =

- Homicide: 1.5 (2022)
- Assault: 1068.8 (2023)
- Burglary: 1148.0 (2020)
- Theft: 2645.9 (2020)
- Fraud: 58.7 (2020)
- Corruption: 0.0 (2023)
- Bribery: 0.0 (2023)
- Money laundering: 29.3 (2018)
- Rape: 58.6 (2023)
- Sexual violence: 117.2 (2023)
- reported per 100,000 inhabitants

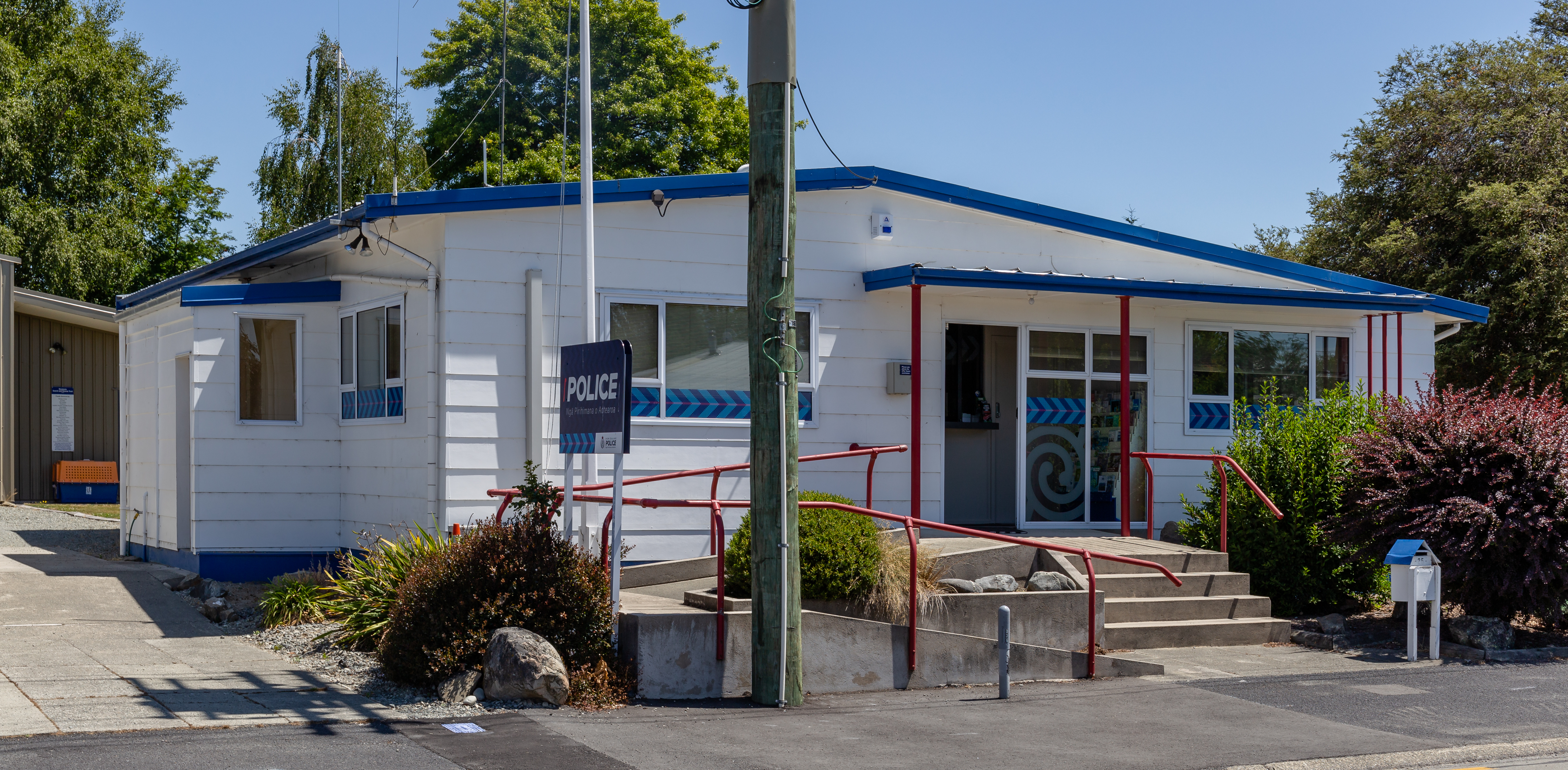
Police station of Twizel

Crime in New Zealand defined primarily by statute, rather than by common law. The main source is the Crimes Act 1961, which sets out a comprehensive code of criminal offences and their penalties. The Summary Offences Act 1981 covers less serious (summary) offences, such as disorderly behaviour, minor assaults, and public nuisance offences. The Misuse of Drugs Act 1975 addresses offences related to the possession, use, manufacture, and supply of controlled drugs. Other laws specify financial crimes, traffic offences, and other kinds of offences.

The laws defining crimes are updated frequently, often in response to stories about crimes which are highlighted in the media, especially those involving violence. Politicians and the public tend to rely on the media for information about the prevalence of crime, and multiple surveys indicate the majority of New Zealanders mistakenly believe that crime is increasing. During election cycles, politicians talk about crime as a 'law and order' issue to such an extent that it has been described as a political football - with parties of all persuasions unveiling competing policies and accusations about who is "soft" or "tough" on crime. Academics point out that calls to crack down on crime have become a recurring pattern in New Zealand, often overshadowing nuanced discussion and evidence-based policy.

In the process, the main factors contributing to criminal offending in New Zealand are largely ignored. They include poverty, adverse childhood experiences, poor school performance, association with delinquent peers, substance abuse and addictions, mental illness, low intelligence, impulsivity, and certain neurological or hormonal factors. Politicians in New Zealand often claim to put victims at the centre of their concerns, ignoring the reality that a substantial majority of those who grow up to commit crimes as adults were previously victimised as children.

Establishing trends in crime rates is complicated by a number of factors including the willingness of the public to report crimes and changes in the way offences are recorded by the Police. The most significant change occurred in 2015 when the police began reporting victimisations instead of offences which ended up in court. This makes any analysis of crime rates before 2015 incompatible with rates following the change.

Assessing the level of violent crime is equally difficult, complicated by significant differences between low level threats, minor assaults and serious violence. Criminologists believe the murder rate is the most reliable indicator of violence in society and this has been relatively stable in New Zealand for some years. Adding another point of view, in 2025, New Zealand was third highest on the Global Peace Index issued by the Institute for Economics and Peace – out of 149 countries. From an international perspective, New Zealand is perceived as a 'safe' country to live in.

== Perspectives on crime in New Zealand ==
=== Public perceptions ===
In a Ministry of Justice, Colmar Brunton survey of 2,051 New Zealanders in 2014, respondents reported that television, newspapers and online news sites were their most common sources of information about crime. The reality is that since 2000, public surveys have consistently shown that a majority of New Zealanders believe crime is increasing.

- In 2003, a Ministry of Justice study reported that 83% of New Zealanders wrongly believed crime was increasing.
- A study in 2009 described an "overwhelming public belief that crime has got worse," despite falling murder rates.
- A Ministry of Justice survey in 2014 found 60% believed national crime had increased in the past year.
- The Justice Sector Long-term Insights Briefing from 2022 also confirms that most of the public believes crime is increasing, even as actual crime rates have dropped over time.
- In 2024, 87% of New Zealanders believed youth crime had increased in the past five years, despite official statistics showing a decline.
- The Crime and Victims Survey (NZCVS) published in 2025 found most New Zealanders were concerned about nationwide crime, but were less concerned about crime in their own neighbourhoods. For instance, 80% of adults expressed concerns about burglaries in general, but only 40% were as concerned about it happening in their own community. Similarly, 78% are concerned about physical assault nationally, but only 23% locally.

=== Political perceptions ===
Discussions about the prevalence of crime in New Zealand tend to be driven by 'law and order' debates in the media at elections. This development has been described by Professor John Pratt as penal populism: "the process whereby the major political parties compete with each other to be tougher on crime than their opponents."

According to Pratt, New Zealand - like the UK and US - moved away from a consensus model of criminal justice (which dominated until the 1980s) toward a populist model where politicians increasingly sidelined expert advice in favour of policies that appeal to public opinion, often fuelled by media coverage and moral panic. This process began in the mid-1990s with the 1993 Electoral Referendum on Law and Order, following a campaign driven by the Sensible Sentencing Trust and similar lobby groups.

The introduction of MMP (Mixed Member Proportional representation) in 1996 gave smaller, often more populist parties (e.g. ACT and New Zealand First) greater influence. This increased pressure on major parties (Labour and National) to adopt more punitive rhetoric and policies to retain voter support. Well-publicised violent crimes in the 1990s (such as the Aramoana Massacre in which 13 people were killed) also led to increased media focus on victims' rights and demands for harsher penalties.

This competition between parties to appear tougher on crime has shaped the trajectory of law and order policy for the last 30 years - often at the expense of effectiveness, fairness, and rehabilitation. It has also contributed to New Zealand's growing prison population. Between 2017 and 2022, the Labour Party attempted to shift back toward expert-led reform and set a goal to reduce the prison population by 30% over 15 years. However, the coalition government of National, ACT and NZ First has returned to this populist approach and reinstated a hardline law-and-order platform.

=== International perceptions ===
New Zealanders' perceptions of crime and safety differ from those perceived internationally. In 2010 and 2011, New Zealand topped the Global Peace Index issued by the Institute for Economics and Peace – out of 149 countries. The index is based on 23 indicators including corruption, violence, crime rates, military spending and access to primary education. According to the 2009 Corruption Perceptions Index by Transparency International, New Zealand is the least corrupt nation in the world.

On the 2025 Global Peace Index, New Zealand is ranked 3rd in the world, just behind Iceland (1st) and Ireland (2nd). New Zealand consistently ranks among the most peaceful countries globally, reflecting high levels of safety, stability, and low crime rates.

== Measuring crime ==
=== Statistical issues ===
Crime statistics in New Zealand are affected by changes in policing practice and the way crimes are recorded. Significant changes that have been made include upgrades to police recording systems, the introduction of national recording standards in 2008, and changes in how offences and resolutions were counted in 2014. New ways of recording crime statistics have created anomalies in the data gathering, making current statistics incompatible with previous data.

Crime statistics are also affected by changes in public willingness to report offences. This depends on numerous factors including media attention to high-profile crimes and the level of confidence in police to take action. See Reporting of crime below.

In addition, different organisations may use different data standards for reporting. For example, Police and Corrections handle people with multiple ethnicities using the prioritised method, whereas Statistics New Zealand uses the total response method. This means a person who identifies as both New Zealand European (Pākehā) and Māori is counted as Māori in police and corrections data, but is counted as both European and Māori in population statistics. This may cause crime statistics, especially those of non-Maori ethnicity, to be under-reported.

=== Current standards ===
Statistics New Zealand sets standards for collecting crime data, and collates statistical data from the Police, Department of Corrections and Ministry of Justice. Each department also publishes their own statistical data. Since 1 July 2010, the entire justice sector has used the Australian and New Zealand Standard Offence Classification (ANZSOC) to classify and aggregate offence, offender and conviction statistics.

=== Reporting of crime ===
Many crimes, especially sexual crimes and domestic violence, go unreported and consequently do not appear in official statistics. This may be because the victims believe them to be too trivial to warrant police attention, which is the most common reason cited for non-reporting, accounting for 38% of unreported incidents.

Reporting rates also vary by age, household type, and ethnicity. For instance, people living in multi-person households are more likely to report crimes where they are victims, especially vehicle offences, burglaries, and interpersonal violence. Property offences, are more likely to be reported when an insurance claim requires a police report. Shifts in media reporting can influence public perceptions and reporting behaviour, especially for high-profile crimes. For instance, increased media coverage such as that driven by the MeToo movement has been credited for a rise in sexual assault victims coming forward to police.

However, many sexual assaults are not be reported out of fear, shame, and beliefs that the victim will be blamed for what happened, and because being interviewed by the police and then taking the matter to court is potentially retraumatising. In 2019, an estimated 94% of sexual assaults were not reported.

=== Victimisation rates ===
The Ministry of Justice has conducted Crime and Safety Surveys (NZCASS) in 2006, 2009 and 2014 to assess victimisation rates as well as other research about crime in New Zealand. Victim surveys tend to suggest that less than a third of 'crime' is actually reported to police, which is consistent with victimisation surveys in similar countries such as Australia, Britain and the United States. However, victim surveys also include reports of relatively minor matters which would not necessarily be seen as crimes by the justice system so interpretation of the figures is difficult. The Crime and Victims Survey (CVS) which replaced the NZCASS surveys in 2018, estimates that only a quarter of all crime was reported to the Police between October 2018 and October 2019.

=== Resolution of cases ===
The resolution rate depends on how 'resolution' is defined (e.g., cases finalised, charges resulting in conviction, or specific clearance rates). For crimes against the person, about 32% of victimisations are finalised within a year — meaning police have either determined no crime occurred or have proceeded against an offender. For property crimes, about 16% of victimisations are finalised within a year under the same criteria. The clearance rate for dwelling burglaries is around 11%. When charges are actually laid by police, more than 70% result in conviction.

Between 1998 and 2014, the resolution rate for serious violence offences was much higher - about 72%. The resolution rate for murder increased from 62% to 85% over this period. Drug and anti-social offences consistently have high resolution rates, often above 70% and reaching over 80% in 2000.

Since the mid-2010s, there have been significant changes in how resolution rates are calculated, with a move toward reporting outcomes within 30 days of the offence being reported. This change provides a more consistent but sometimes lower resolution rate, especially for crimes that require longer investigations. Crimes against the person have more than double the resolution rate of crimes against property. However, the overall long-term trend shows a downward movement in the resolution rate, largely due to an increasing proportion of property crimes which are harder to resolve in the overall crime mix.

== Crime rates ==
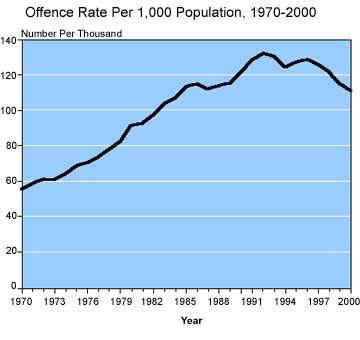

=== Total recorded offence rates ===
==== 20th Century ====
Based on the recorded offence rate, the crime rate increased steadily from the 1950s peaking in 1992 at 1,322 offences per 10,000 population which was seven times higher than the rate in 1950. After the peak in 1992, the number of recorded offences declined, reaching 994 per 10,000 population in 2005, which was similar to the rate in 1982.

The largest category of recorded offences during this period was dishonesty offences, mainly theft and burglary, though their rate declined by 32% from 1996 to 2005.

==== 21st Century ====
The recorded crime rate has continued to decline in the twenty-first century. By 2014, the total number of offences had dropped by 22% and was the lowest since 1989 - with significant drops in homicide and property crimes. Police said the largest decrease was in Canterbury, where recorded crime fell by over 11% – due to a large decrease in recorded theft and property damage offences immediately after the Christchurch earthquakes in 2011.

In 2015, the Police changed the way they recorded offences, moving from a system that counted offences to one that counted victimisations. Between 2015 and 2018, victimisation rates remained relatively stable with minor fluctuations.

==== Contemporary Pattern (2018–2024) ====
In 2022, a surge in ram-raiding attracted significant media and public attention. In July 2022, Radio New Zealand (RNZ) reported a 400% increase in ram raids over the past five years with 76% of those arrested being under the age of 18 years. However, only 37% of the ram raids resulted in Police enforcement action. Police Commissioner Andrew Coster expressed concern about Police having difficulty prosecuting young offenders due to their age, while Prime Minister Jacinda Ardern emphasised that the government preferred solutions that did not involve incarceration in order to reduce reoffending.

Despite the intense publicity on ram raids, according to the New Zealand Crime and Victims Survey, about 32% of New Zealanders experienced crime in 2023, a figure that has remained stable since 2018. In fact, fraud has become the most common offence with 10% of New Zealanders affected in the last survey - reflecting a global trend linked to increased online activity.

=== Violent crime rate ===
Violent crime is defined in New Zealand as acts involving physical force or the threat of force against another person. This includes homicide (murder and manslaughter), robbery, assault (grievous, serious, or minor), sexual assault, family violence (including intimate partner violence and child abuse), kidnapping and abduction, intimidation and threats. These offences are primarily codified in the Crimes Act 1961 and related legislation.

However, these offences range from minor assaults (punishable by fines or short imprisonment) to the most serious crimes like murder which is punishable by life imprisonment. The law also recognises aggravated forms of these offences based on factors such as the use of weapons, the vulnerability of the victim (e.g., children, family members), or the offender's intent.

According to Te Ara, the Encyclopedia of New Zealand, violent crime increased gradually after WWII, with reported violent crimes rising from 640 per 100,000 people in 1985 to a peak of 1,562 in 1996, then fluctuating, but remaining elevated. However, this data does not distinguish between minor assaults and serious violent offences.

==== Recording victimisations instead of offences ====
In 2015, the Police changed the way they recorded violent offences, moving from a system that counted offences to one that counted victimisations. The change means that data before and after 2015 are not comparable, as the counting rules and focus are fundamentally different. Between 2015 and 2023, the number of violent crime victimisations increased by 33%, largely due to these changes in recording methods. These victimisation reports are not the same as recorded convictions which are substantially lower.

=== Homicide rate ===
Criminologists generally consider the homicide rate (which includes murder and manslaughter) to be a more reliable indicator of violent crime than other crime statistics - because homicide is the most serious form of violence and the least open to interpretation, making it less susceptible to differences in legal definitions, reporting practices, and under-reporting compared to other violent crimes.

The homicide rate was low in the first half of the 20th century. In 1960, New Zealand recorded 16 murders with a population of approximately 2,377,000. The rate began to rise steeply from then on, peaking in the early 1990s. This pattern mirrored trends in other Western countries during this period. After peaking at 92 homicides in 1992, the murder rate began a steady decline. By the 2010s, New Zealand's murder rate had dropped by almost half compared to 20 years prior. Between 2007 and 2022, there were an average of 73 homicides per year. Removing the 51 murders attributed to the 2019 Christchurch mosque shootings, there were an average of 70 homicides per year over the same period.

== The drivers of crime ==
The main factors contributing to crime are complex and multifaceted, involving a combination of social, economic, psychological, and biological influences. The key factors identified in research include:

- poverty, economic hardship, unemployment, and income inequality are strongly linked to higher crime rates;
- adverse childhood experiences including exposure to psychological and emotional abuse, neglect, family violence, poor parental supervision, and parental criminality increases the risk of future criminal behaviour;
- substance abuse and addiction which impairs judgment, lower inhibitions, and drives individuals to commit crimes to support their addiction;
- association with delinquent peers, living in high-crime neighborhoods, and negative social influences;
- mental illness, low intelligence, impulsivity, and certain neurological or hormonal factors can increase the likelihood of criminal acts, particularly if untreated;
- poor school performance, lack of educational opportunities, and low educational attainment;
- exposure to high levels of violence, lack of community support, and poor living conditions can foster environments where crime is more likely.

=== Drivers of crime forum in New Zealand ===
A forum held at Parliament in 2009 on the Drivers of Crime in New Zealand identified mainly socio-economic factors contributing to crime such as: "Family dysfunction; child maltreatment; poor educational achievement; harmful drinking and drug use; poor mental health; severe behavioural problems among children and young people; and the intergenerational transmission of criminal behaviour." The forum noted that "Many of these issues are concentrated within socially and economically disadvantaged families and communities."

Studies on the impact of colonialism suggests these life circumstances are more likely to affect Māori families than non-Māori. Systemic bias in the justice system also contributes to the comparatively high rates of Māori ending up in prison.

=== Alcohol abuse ===
In 2010 the Law Commission released a report on the harm caused by alcohol in New Zealand and quoted district court judges who said that 80% of all offending in New Zealand occurred under the influence of alcohol and drugs.

To address the problem, the Government asked the Law Commission to conduct a comprehensive investigation into New Zealand's liquor legislation. The commission received thousands of submissions and their investigation took over two years leading to the release of a 500-page in-depth report: Alcohol in Our Lives: Curbing the Harm. The Government incorporated many of the less important recommendations made by the Commission into the Alcohol Reform Bill. However, the Bill was widely criticised by health professionals for failing to address six key evidenced-based recommendations put forward by the commission.

=== Methamphetamine ===
Since 2000, methamphetamine use has been strongly linked to increases in violent crime, including homicides, assaults, and domestic violence. Police and research reports consistently highlight that frequent users are more likely to be involved in criminal and violent activity, with methamphetamine-related violence often more severe than that associated with other drugs. By 2007, 73% of detected clandestine laboratories were linked to organised crime, with weapons found in a significant proportion of these sites.

== Characteristics of offenders ==
The following characteristics are common amongst offenders in New Zealand. These characteristics frequently overlap, meaning that a typical offender may be a young, Māori male with a significant history of economic and social deprivation, limited education and multiple health challenges.

- Gender: The majority of crime in New Zealand is committed by males. In the ten years to December 2024, males made up about 76.3% of those apprehended by police, with a male-to-female ratio of around 3.2 to 1. Across offence categories, the male-to-female ratio ranges from less than 2-to-1 for theft, fraud and deception, to 36-to-1 for sexual offences. As at 31 March 2025, the ratio of male to female prisoners in New Zealand is approximately 12.4 to 1. About 92.5% of prisoners are male and only 7.5% are female.
- A small percentage of the gender disparity may be due to historic or current laws that don't criminalise female-perpetrated offending. For example, female-perpetrated sexual offending against males wasn't fully criminalised in New Zealand until May 2005, and as of 2025, the offence "male assaults female" still exists, which carries double the penalty of common assault.
- Age: Offenders tend to be young and begin offending in their teens – initial arrests often occurring as early as age 15. The mean age of high-risk offenders in prison is around 27 years. Many have a history of childhood abuse, neglect, or victimisation, and experience family dysfunction, parental conflict, and lack of supervision.
- Limited education and employment: A large proportion of offenders have low educational achievement. Many leave school early (age 15 or under) and have no qualifications or vocational skills. Unemployment is common, with up to 60% of offenders in prison unemployed prior to imprisonment.
- Addictions: Addiction to drugs or alcohol is prevalent, with estimates that up to 80% of offending occurs under the influence of substances. This substance use often begins in early teenage years to alleviate the trauma and distress stemming from dysfunctional childhoods.
- Ethnicity: New Zealand's crime statistics are compounded by the over-representation of Māori. Despite Māori making up only 16% of the general population, figures show 42% of all criminal apprehensions involve a person identifying as Māori, as do 51% of those in prison. For Māori women, the picture is even more acute: they comprise around 60% of the female prison population.
- Gang affiliation: About 35% of prisoners are gang-affiliated, with 70% of gang members being Māori. Gang involvement is often linked to a search for belonging due to dysfunctional family backgrounds. This figure has increased significantly over recent decades. In 1983 only about 4% of the prison population was gang affiliated.
- Prior victimisation: A significant majority of those who end up in prison in New Zealand as 'offenders' were 'victims' as children whose needs were not met. A Ministry of Justice report in 2019 found that 97% of children aged 10 to 13 who offended seriously had prior child welfare notifications to Oranga Tamariki, indicating prior abuse or neglect. 87% of young offenders aged 14 to 16 had prior care-and-protection concerns, 80% had experienced family violence, and 75% of women in prison have been the victims of sexual and family violence.

== Characteristics of victims ==
Economic disadvantage and social deprivation are the main factors in becoming a victim of crime in New Zealand. Victimisation clusters among those facing multiple layers of vulnerability, such as economic hardship, social isolation, and lack of resources to prevent or recover from crime. Research from 2009 found that over 50% of crime was experienced by just 6% of the population, with chronic victims (those experiencing five or more offences in a year) being more likely to be young, Māori, unemployed, or in financially struggling households.

- Ethnicity: Māori are consistently identified as being at higher risk of victimisation compared to other ethnic groups. This elevated risk is linked to both a younger age profile and higher rates of residence in deprived areas, rather than ethnicity alone.
- Age: Younger people, particularly those aged 15–24, are more likely to be victims of crime, including multiple or repeat victimisation.
- Gender and sexual orientation: Women are more likely to experience sexual assault, and people who identify as gay, lesbian, bisexual, or with other diverse sexualities report much higher rates of sexual assault than the general population.
- Disability: Adults with disabilities are more likely to experience both personal and household offences.
- Marital and household status: Single people, those in de facto relationships, sole-parent households, or living with flatmates are at higher risk, as are those not in the labour force (e.g., home duties, students).

== Rates of imprisonment ==
In New Zealand, as in most western democracies, the rate at which people are sent to prison primarily depends on trends in penal policy and sentencing law, in particular laws affecting the availability of community-based sentence options for judges, the use of remand, and the maximum length of sentences for any given offence. Penal policy is inevitably affected by the prevailing political climate. Professor John Pratt of Victoria University in Wellington says that while crime is driven primarily by socio-economic factors, the growing rate of imprisonment in Western countries has been driven by penal populism – the process whereby the major political parties compete with each to be "tough on crime" by proposing laws which create longer sentences and increase the use of remand prior to sentencing. The news media contribute to penal populism by sensationalising violent crime.

=== Violent vs non-violent prisoners ===
Along with the perception that crime is on the increase, there is another common misperception that most people in prison in New Zealand have been convicted of violent offending. The view is supported by a Corrections Department one-day snapshot based on the prison population in December 2024 which found that more than 54% of prisoners population were serving sentences or facing charges for sexual or violent offending.

However, this snapshot includes prisoners on remand who have yet to be convicted of anything. It also ignores the reality that the prison population is very fluid and altogether, about 20,000 people spend time in prison each year. Most are given a sentence of two years or less and released halfway through their sentence - because their offending was not that serious. Since there are only about 6,000 sentenced prisoners at any one time, this means about 14,000 Kiwis who spent time in prison in 2024 were not in prison on the day the snapshot was taken.

When looking specifically at sentenced prisoners (as opposed to those on remand), Statistics NZ data for 2023–2024 shows that about 39.1% were sentenced for what are considered violent offences (including homicide, acts intended to cause injury, sexual assault, abduction, harassment, and robbery). This means that around 60% of sentenced prisoners are there for non-violent crimes such as drug dealing, shoplifting, theft, drink driving or even breaches of court conditions.

=== Rates ===
- 1950s–1970s:

In the mid-20th century, New Zealand's prison population was relatively low and stable. The prison system in the 1950s had changed little since the 1920s. In 1950, there were 1,043 people in New Zealand prisons, resulting in a rate of approximately 53 prisoners per 100,000 people, based on a total New Zealand population of approximately 1,970,500.

- 1980s–2000s:

From the 1980s onward, New Zealand saw a substantial rise in imprisonment rates. Legislative changes in the 1990s and early 2000s, such as the Sentencing Act 2002 and Parole Act 2002, made it more likely for offenders to receive prison sentences, even though average sentence lengths did not increase dramatically. As a result, the prison population more than doubled from 3,763 in 1993 to 8,433 in December 2011. By May 2011, the imprisonment rate reached 199 per 100,000 people, placing New Zealand among the highest in the OECD.

- 2010s–2020s:

The imprisonment rate continued to fluctuate. In 2018, it peaked at 214 per 100,000, higher than Australia (172) and England & Wales (140) at that time. However, the Labour led Government became the first in New Zealand to try and reduce the prison population - setting a goal of 30% reduction over 15 years. By 2022, the number of inmates was down by nearly 3,000 and the rate had decreased to 149 per 100,000, which was closer to England & Wales (134) and below Australia (165).

- Current Rate:

As at June 2025, the imprisonment rate was 199 per 100,000, with a total prison population of about 10,783. This rate remains high compared to similar countries; for example, it is about double that of Canada and significantly above Australia and England.

== See also ==
- Corruption in New Zealand
- Gangs in New Zealand
- List of countries by incarceration rate
- Terrorism in New Zealand
- Violence against women in New Zealand
- Cannabis in New Zealand
- Speed limits in New Zealand
- Abortion in New Zealand
- Gun laws in New Zealand
- Legal aid in New Zealand
- Female genital mutilation in New Zealand
- Forced marriage in New Zealand
- Prostitution in New Zealand
- Prisoners' rights in New Zealand
- Unreasonable search and seizure in New Zealand
- Capital punishment in New Zealand
- Child abuse in New Zealand
- Blasphemy law in New Zealand
- Presumption of supply in New Zealand
- Litter in New Zealand
- Alcohol in New Zealand
- Censorship in New Zealand
- Criminal justice in New Zealand

Organisations

- Howard League for Penal Reform Canterbury
- Neighbourhood Support
- Sensible Sentencing Trust
