= Jonathan Temm =

New Zealand barrister (1962–2021)

Jonathan Paul Temm QC (16 June 1962 – 3 March 2021) was a New Zealand barrister. He served as president of the New Zealand Law Society from 2010 until 2013.

== Personal ==
Temm was born in Auckland. He was educated at St Peter's College. Temm has said that his education there prepared him for his career in the justice system. "Some of the Christian principles that were passed to me in my secondary education still operate in my life today and still influence me in my legal career in that I do try to help other people who ask for my assistance and I do try to look for the good in all people, including in the Curtis brothers who were found guilty of the murder of Nia Glassie."

Temm went overseas for seven years from 1980 to 1987 and worked in different jobs before returning to New Zealand to pursue a future in the law. He studied law at the University of Auckland and graduated in 1992 with Honours. He won the Geoffrey Powell Prize and the Stout Shield for mooting while studying. He was admitted as a Barrister and Solicitor at High Court in Auckland on 11 June 1993. He is the son of the late Justice Paul Temm, a Judge of the High Court of New Zealand. Jonathan Temm and his wife, Lynnelle, have five children. He loved cycling and was a keen fisherman and golfer.

== Career ==
Temm began his career at Chapman Tripp Sheffield Young in Auckland from 1993 to 1995. He joined Davys Burton in Rotorua in 1995, becoming a partner and "Senior Crown Counsel" before starting up as a barrister sole specialising in criminal and civil litigation at Phoenix Chambers in 2005. He was a Council member of the then Waikato Bay of Plenty District Law Society from 2000 to 2003 and 2005 to 2009 and was President from 2007 to 2009. He served on the New Zealand Law Society Board from 2004 to 2008 and was President from April 2010 until 2013. Temm's practice has been varied, but he has dealt with high-profile criminal cases during his career, including defending Michael Curtis, one of two brothers convicted of the murder of toddler Nia Glassie. He found such cases difficult to deal with. Temm has been actively involved in professional legal skills training, and has been a member of the New Zealand Law Society's Litigation Skills Faculty since 2005.

In December 2019, Temm was appointed a Queen's Counsel.

== Approach ==
In 2010, Temm blamed the rise in abuse cases on the decline in children being seen by Plunket nurses. He wanted to see legislation and health funding that would protect New Zealand children in the long term. He saw the drivers of child abuse in New Zealand as including:

[s]ociety's attitude to alcohol and the freedom of it and the increasing fractured nature of our families and a myriad of other things including drug abuse, mental health issues, financial strain and all of these things ... What happened then is that the fourth Labour government was elected and new right economic theory took sway. The Roger Douglas market theory was being applied and the statutory monopoly, that used to exist for Plunket and Karitane, was eroded and eventually done away with. So our preschool childcare was significantly dented.

Temm challenged the New Zealand Government to put the money where it is needed. "If you are serious about child abuse in New Zealand, you must pick up the challenge of the pre-school childcare through the health system and a number of other things could be leveraged off that. Every single child born in New Zealand should have his or her birth registered and the entire country should be divided into quadrants and every child, before the age of three, should be the responsibility of a Plunket or Karitane nurse and everything would leverage off that service".

Temm was also concerned about the Sentencing Act 2002. He believed that that Act was not working because of "at least 70 per cent of criminals behind bars suffering a mental disorder of some kind". With it costing between $50,000 and $100,000 annually to keep someone in jail he asked whether the country is properly dealing with the people in the community if such disorders are not adequately treated.

As New Zealand Law Society President Temm believed the biggest issue facing the Society was public and political criticism of the legal profession. He said that while he had confidence that most New Zealand lawyers are performing extremely well, he considered that there were some people in the profession who were not holding to the well-established rules of professional conduct and ethics that the profession expected. Temm said the Law Society would take a firm stance with any misconduct.

== Death ==
Temm died on 3 March 2021, at the age of 58.
