= Führer =

German word meaning 'leader' or 'guide'

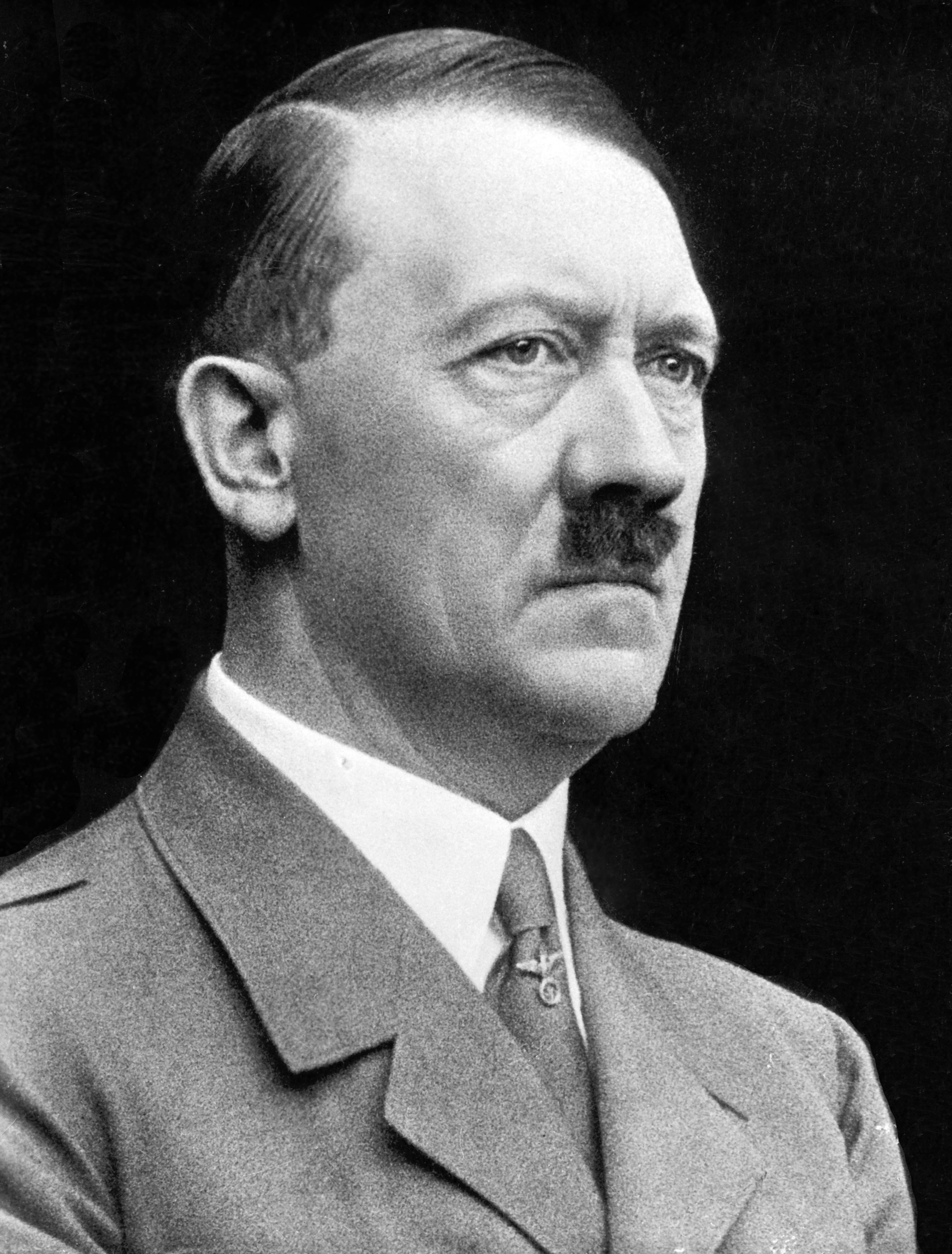
Adolf Hitler, the leader of Nazi Germany from 1933 to 1945, used the "Führer" title.

Führer (/ˈfjʊər.ər/, FURE-ər; [ˈfyːʁɐ], spelled Fuehrer when the umlaut is unavailable) is a German word meaning 'leader' or 'guide'. As a political title, it is strongly associated with Adolf Hitler, the dictator of Germany from 1933 to 1945. Hitler officially called himself der Führer und Reichskanzler ('the Leader and Chancellor of the Reich') after the death of President Paul von Hindenburg in 1934, as well as the subsequent merging of the offices of Reichspräsident and Reichskanzler.

Nazi Germany cultivated the Führerprinzip ('leader principle'), and Hitler was generally known as simply der Führer ('the Leader').

In compound words, the use of Führer remains common in German and is used in words such as Reiseführer ('travel guide'), Museumsführer ('museum docent'), Bergführer ('mountain guide'), Führerschein ('driver's licence'), Spielführer ('game captain'), and Oppositionsführer ('leader of the opposition'). However, because of its strong association with Hitler, the isolated word itself usually has negative connotations when used with the meaning of leader, especially in political contexts.

The word Führer has cognates in the Scandinavian languages, spelled fører in Danish and Norwegian. In Norwegian, the word has the same meaning as the German word. The Norwegian word for mayor is ordfører, literally meaning word leader. In Swedish Ordförande means 'Chairman' and applies to a wide range of situations, for example in corporate boards or as the head of an official gathering of members. In Swedish and Danish, förare and fører normally means 'driver' (of a vehicle), a meaning Führer can also have in German. However, in the compound word härförare and hærfører, that part does mean 'leader', and is a cognate of the German Heerführer (military leader).

== History ==
=== Background ===
Führer has been used as a military title (compare Latin Dux) in Germany since at least the 18th century. The usage of the term "Führer" in the context of a company-sized military subunit in the German Army referred to a commander lacking the qualifications for permanent command. For example, the commanding officer of a company was titled "Kompaniechef" (lit. 'Company Chief'), but if he did not have the requisite rank or experience, or was only temporarily assigned to command, he was officially titled "Kompanieführer". Thus operational commands of various military echelons were typically referred to by their formation title followed by the title Führer, in connection with mission-type tactics used by the German military forces. The term Führer was also used at lower levels, regardless of experience.

=== Origins of the political concept ===
The first example of the political use of Führer was with the pan-German Austrian Georg Ritter von Schönerer (1842–1921), a major exponent of pan-Germanism and German nationalism in Austria, whose followers commonly referred to him as the Führer, and who also used the Roman salute – where the right arm and hand are held rigidly outstretched – which they called the "German greeting". According to historian Richard J. Evans, this use of "Führer" by Schönerer's Pan-German Association, probably introduced the term to the German far-right, but its specific adoption by the Nazis may also have been influenced by the use in Italy of "Duce", also meaning "leader", as an informal title for Benito Mussolini, the Fascist Prime Minister, and later (from 1922) dictator, of that country.

=== Führer of the Nazi Party ===
Adolf Hitler took the title to denote his function as head of the Nazi Party; he received it in 1921 when, infuriated over party founder Anton Drexler's plan to merge with another antisemitic far-right nationalist party, he resigned from the party. Drexler and the party's Executive Committee then acquiesced to Hitler's demand to be made the chairman of the party with "dictatorial powers" as the condition for his return.

=== Führer and Chancellor ===
The Führer and Chancellor of the German Reich (1934–1942) Greater German Reich (1942–1945)
- Der Führer und Kanzler des Deutschen Reiches (1934–1942); Der Führer und Kanzler des Großdeutschen Reiches (1942–1945)
- Standard of the Führer

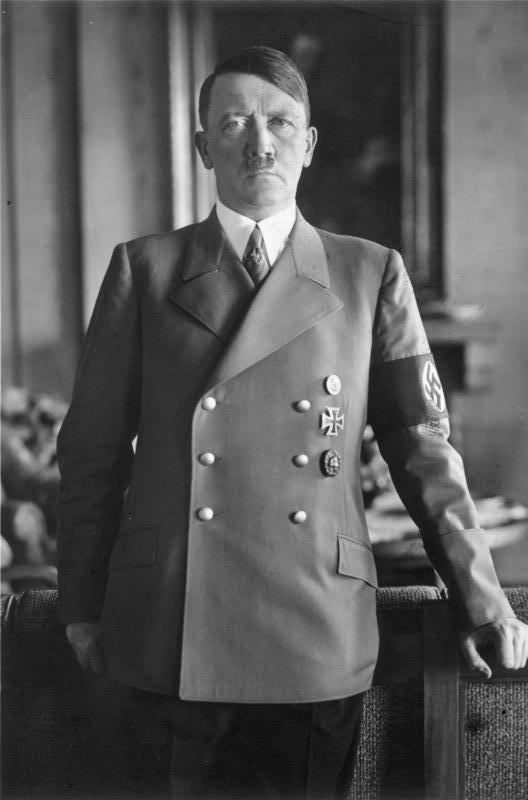
- Adolf Hitler; 2 August 1934 – 30 April 1945
- Style: Mein Führer
- Type: Head of state; Head of government; Commander-in-chief; Party leader
- Precursor: President; Chancellor
- Formation: 2 August 1934
- First holder: Adolf Hitler
- Final holder: Adolf Hitler
- Abolished: 30 April 1945
- Superseded by: President; Chancellor

On 30 January 1933, Hitler was appointed Reichskanzler (Chancellor of the Reich) by President Paul von Hindenburg.

A month later, the decision to vote with the Nazi Party taken by the MPs of the Centre Party allowed the Nazi-dominated Reichstag to reach the qualified constitutional two-thirds majority required for passage of the Enabling Act allowing the cabinet to promulgate laws by decree, rendering in practice the system of checks and balances defunct. The Act became the official legal justification for such decrees later routinely issued by Hitler himself.

==== Führer and Chancellor of the German Reich ====
One day before Hindenburg's death, Hitler and his cabinet decreed the "Law Concerning the Head of State of the German Reich", which stipulated that upon Hindenburg's death, the office of the president was to be merged with that of Chancellor. Thus, upon Hindenburg's death, Hitler became Führer und Reichskanzler – although eventually Reichskanzler was quietly dropped from day-to-day usage and retained only in official documents. Hitler therefore assumed the President's powers without assuming the office itself – ostensibly out of respect for Hindenburg's achievements as a heroic figure in World War I. The Enabling Act had specifically prohibited legislation that would affect the position or powers of the Reich President, but the first one-party Reichstag elected in November 1933 had passed an act on the first anniversary of Hitler's appointment as Chancellor, 30 January 1934, abolishing those restrictions. It was then approved by a referendum on 19 August.

==== Führer and Chancellor of the Greater German Reich ====
On 28 July 1942, the title was changed to "der Führer und Reichskanzler des Großdeutschen Reiches" (Leader and Chancellor of the Greater German Reich).

=== Führer and Supreme Commander of the Wehrmacht ===
According to the Weimar Constitution, the President was the Supreme Commander of the Armed Forces. Unlike "President", Hitler did take this title (Oberbefehlshaber) for himself. When conscription was reintroduced in 1935, Hitler created the title of Commander-in-Chief of the Armed Forces, a post held by the Minister of War. He retained the title of Supreme Commander for himself. Soldiers had to swear allegiance to Hitler as "Führer des deutschen Reiches und Volkes" (Leader of the German Reich and Nation). Field Marshal Werner von Blomberg, then the Minister of War and one of those who created the Hitler oath, or the personal oath of loyalty of the military to Hitler, became the Commander-in-Chief of the Armed Forces while Hitler remained Supreme Commander. Following the Blomberg–Fritsch affair in 1938, Hitler assumed the commander-in-chief's post as well and took personal command of the armed forces. However, he continued using the older formally higher title of Supreme Commander, which was thus filled with a somewhat new meaning. Combining it with "Führer", he used the style Führer und Oberster Befehlshaber der Wehrmacht (Leader and Supreme Commander of the Wehrmacht), yet a simple "Führer" after May 1942.

=== Führer of the German Reich and Nation ===
Soldiers had to swear allegiance to Hitler as "Führer des deutschen Reiches und Volkes" (Leader of the German Reich and Nation). In his political testament, Hitler also referred to himself as Führer der Nation (Leader of the Nation).

=== Germanic Führer ===
An additional title was adopted by Hitler on 23 June 1941 when he declared himself the "Germanic Führer" (Germanischer Führer), in addition to his duties as Führer of the German state and people. This was done to emphasise Hitler's professed leadership of what the Nazis described as the "Nordic-Germanic master race", which was considered to include peoples such as the Norwegians, Danes, Swedes, Dutch, and others in addition to the Germans, and the intent to annex these countries to the German Reich to form the Greater Germanic Reich (Großgermanisches Reich deutscher Nation). Waffen-SS formations from these countries had to declare obedience to Hitler by addressing him in this fashion. On 12 December 1941, Dutch fascist Anton Mussert also addressed him as such when he proclaimed his allegiance to Hitler during a visit to the Reich Chancellery in Berlin. He had wanted to address Hitler as Führer aller Germanen ("Führer of all Germanics"), but Hitler personally decreed the former style. Historian Loe de Jong speculates on the difference between the two: Führer aller Germanen implied a position separate from Hitler's role as Führer und Reichskanzler des Grossdeutschen Reiches ("Führer and Reich Chancellor of the Greater German Reich"), while germanischer Führer served more as an attribute of that main function. As late as 1944, however, occasional propaganda publications continued to refer to him by this unofficial title.

=== Führerprinzip ===
One of the Nazis' most-repeated political slogans was Ein Volk, ein Reich, ein Führer – "One People, One Empire, One Leader". Historian Joseph Bendersky says the slogan "left an indelible mark on the minds of most Germans who lived through the Nazi years. It appeared on countless posters and in publications; it was heard constantly in radio broadcasts and speeches." The slogan emphasised the absolute control of the leader over practically every sector of German society and culture – with the churches being formally the most notable exception. The designation Führer itself was initially used only in the context of the Nazi Party, though its meaning gradually sprawled to cover the German state, the German Armed Forces, the German nation, and ultimately all the Germanic peoples.

Hitler's word became in practice absolute and ultimate, even when incompatible with the constitution, as he saw himself as the sole source of power in Germany, similar to the Roman emperors and German early medieval leaders. In spite of that, he took great care to maintain the pretence of legality of his dictatorship. He issued thousands of decrees that were based explicitly on the Reichstag Fire Decree. That decree itself was based on Article 48 of the constitution, which gave the president the power to take measures deemed necessary to protect public order. The Enabling Act was renewed in 1937 for four years and again in 1939 for four years by the Reichstag. In 1943, it was extended indefinitely by a decree from Hitler himself. Those extensions by the Reichstag were merely a formality with all other parties having been banned.

However, Hitler had a narrow range of interest – mostly involving diplomacy and the military – and so his subordinates interpreted his vaguely formulated orders and wishes in a manner beneficial to their own interests or those of their organisations. This led to vicious power wrangles that were immensely beneficial to Hitler in aiding him to ensure that no subordinate amassed enough power to challenge or jeopardise his absolute rule.

== Usage in lower ranks of Nazi Germany ==
Regional Nazi Party leaders were called Gauleiter, "leiter" also meaning "leader". Almost every Nazi paramilitary organisation, in particular the SS and SA, had Nazi Party paramilitary ranks incorporating the title of Führer. The SS including the Waffen-SS, like all paramilitary Nazi organisations, called all their members of any rank except the lowest one a Führer of something; thus confusingly, Gruppenführer was also an official rank title for a specific grade of general. The word Truppenführer was also a generic word referring to any commander or leader of troops and could be applied to NCOs or officers at many different levels of command.

== See also ==
Terms derived from Führer

- Reichsführer-SS
- Reichsjugendführer
- Deputy Führer
- Oberster SA-Führer
- Führer Headquarters
- Führerbunker

- Führer Directives
- Führermuseum
- Führerprinzip
- Führerreserve
- Führerstadt

Other

- Caudillo
- Duce
- Conducător
- President for life
- Poglavnik

- Supreme Leader (disambiguation)
- Zucht und Ordnung
- List of German expressions in English
