= Criminal justice in New Zealand =

The criminal justice system in New Zealand is the collection of government agencies and institutions, including the police, courts, and correctional services that work together to uphold the law, prevent and respond to crime - and administer justice by investigating, prosecuting, and holding criminal offenders to account. The main functions of the system are to maintain social order, protect the freedoms and rights of individuals, ensure accountability for those who break the law - based on fair and impartial treatment - and to rehabilitate offenders. Criminal justice is distinct from criminal law, which defines what constitutes a crime and the penalties for it. It is also distinct from criminology, which focuses on understanding the causes of crime and the behavior of offenders.

However, the justice system is not the only contributor to social order in New Zealand. Egalitarian social norms, informal support networks of family, friends, and respect for cultural traditions play a more important role in maintaining a civil society. While governments tend to focus on 'law and order' issues, especially during election cycles, and use high-profile incidents to suggest that crime is out of control, surveys indicate that the vast majority of New Zealanders feel safe in their own homes.

International surveys such as the Global Peace Index and Transparency International consistently indicate that New Zealand is largely seen as corruption-free, and one of the safest and most peaceful countries in the world. However, because successive governments have succumbed to the pressures of penal populism, from the 1980s, New Zealand has high rates of imprisonment and recidivism compared with other western countries.

Despite the cyclical concerns about 'law and order,' the courts in New Zealand are generally seen as impartial and free of corruption. However, in the last few years, justice has been impacted by significant delays in cases getting to court. Concerns have also been raised about the quality of pre-sentence reports supplied to judges by the Corrections Department; and about the small number of specialist reports to assist judges at sentencing. In 2024, the current government stopped legal aid funding for cultural reports. These were seen as necessary to implement Te Ao Marama, an initiative of chief district court judge, Heemi Taumaunu, to introduce solution-focussed judging to all district courts. That initiative has now stalled, pending a review by the Ministry of Justice.

Despite the importance of providing fair and impartial treatment, a growing number miscarriages of justice have occurred in recent years. Concerns have been raised about the use of prison snitches, false confessions and tunnel vision in police investigations, but also about the inability or slow response of the appeal courts and the Ministry of Justice to turn these convictions around. The frequency with which the criminal justice system has been getting it wrong eventually led to the establishment of the Criminal Case Review Commission which is independent of the courts and the MOJ.

The justice system also has a very poor record when it comes to rehabilitating criminal offenders. The Corrections Department's prison based programmes have very little impact, generally reducing reoffending, on average, by less than 5%; as a result recidivism rates in New Zealand are high compared with other western countries. The Alcohol and Other Drug Treatment Court in Auckland is the only justice related intervention in New Zealand that makes a significant difference, reducing reoffending of graduates by 86% in the first 12 months after treatment.

== Deterrence and the maintenance of social order ==
Section 8 of the Sentencing Act 2002 lists eight 'purposes of sentencing'. Seven of those purposes relate to denunciation, deterrence and holding the offender to account - all intended to impose social order. Only one purpose of sentencing is to assist offenders rehabilitate.

Social norms

Despite the political focus on 'law and order', the effectiveness of the justice system at deterring crime is influenced by multiple factors beyond law enforcement and sentencing. New Zealand's social order is maintained through a mix of egalitarian norms, community-mindedness, informal support networks of family, friends and respected others (including professionals such as doctors, lawyers, counsellors, government and local service agencies), and respect for cultural traditions.

The crime rate

As such, it is difficult to determine the role or impact of the criminal justice system in this process. One measure of its effectiveness might be the ups and downs of the New Zealand crime rate, which rose steadily during the 20th century peaking in 1992, but has declined considerable since then. However, the official crime rate is not necessarily a reliable indicator of the level of crime in society. The New Zealand Crime and Victims Survey (NZCVS) published by the Ministry of Justice, claims that only a quarter of all crime incidents are actually reported to the police. But this figure is based on answers to survey questions about victimization, rather than crimes that were reported to police, and may or may not meet the standard necessary for prosecution.

=== International perspectives ===
- Global Peace Index: Perhaps the best indicator of how effective New Zealand is at maintaining social order is its position on the Global Peace Index issued by the Institute for Economics and Peace. In 2010 and 2011, New Zealand topped the index - out of 149 countries - based on 23 indicators including corruption, violence, crime rates, military spending and access to primary education. On the 2025 Global Peace Index, New Zealand ranked 3rd in the world, just behind Iceland (1st) and Ireland (2nd). New Zealand consistently ranks among the most peaceful countries globally, reflecting high levels of safety, stability, and low crime rates.
- Corruption Perceptions Index: Serious fraud is prosecuted by the Serious Fraud Office in New Zealand. New Zealand also ranks among the least corrupt countries in the world, consistently placing in the top tier of the Transparency International Corruption Perceptions Index (CPI). In the 2024 CPI, New Zealand scored 83 out of 100. This put use fourth in the world behind Denmark, Finland, and Singapore — after previously holding the top spot alongside Denmark for many years. This makes New Zealand a global leader in perceived public sector integrity, in comparison to most other countries.

=== Comparative prison rankings ===
Historically, politicians in New Zealand including from the current government, have assumed that longer prison sentences will deter crime or reduce reoffending. The current Corrections Minister, Mark Mitchell, has even stated a preference for scrapping short prison sentences in favor of longer ones.

- In July 2025, New Zealand's rate of imprisonment was 197 people per 100,000 population, which is significantly higher than the OECD average.
- In Australia, the rate is 163 per 100,000;
- In England and Wales, the rate is 141 per 100,000;
- In Canada the rate is 90 per 100,000;
- In Finland its 52 per 100,000; and
- In Germany the rate is 68 per 100,000.

Contributing factors: In other words, New Zealand's rate of imprisonment is well above most Western European and other developed nations. A number of factors in the justice system contribute to this high rate:

- Policy and public attitudes: The prison population is largely driven by government policy and public attitudes toward crime and punishment, rather than actual crime rates.
- Tougher sentencing and parole laws: Legislative changes, such as the Sentencing and Parole Reform Act 2010 and the Bail Amendment Act 2013, have increased the length of sentences and made it harder for offenders to get bail or parole. These policies were often introduced in response to high-profile crimes and public pressure, rather than evidence of effectiveness, and have not been shown to deter crime.
- Underlying social issues: Māori are disproportionately represented at every stage of the criminal justice system, as a result of systemic issues such as intergenerational trauma, marginalization, and institutional racism. They make up 52% of the prison population despite being only about 15% of the general population. The majority of those in prison also have histories of abuse, mental health issues, and substance abuse. These underlying social issues are not adequately addressed by the justice system, leading to higher rates of offending and reoffending.
- Flawed rehabilitation programmes: Corrections Department rehabilitation programmes are largely ineffective at reducing reoffending (see Justice and rehabilitation below) and around 56.5% of people with previous convictions are reconvicted within two years of release, and 35.8% are re-imprisoned, which keeps the prison population high.

== The prosecution process ==
Most crimes in New Zealand are prosecuted by the Police. However, approximately 81% of police prosecutors in New Zealand do not have a law degree, and only about 19% have legal qualifications.

The most serious crimes are prosecuted by Crown Solicitors, which are private law firms appointed by the Governor-General. Crown Solicitors conduct prosecutions in Category 4 offences, which cover the most serious crimes like murder; schedule offences, which are listed offences such as aggravated robbery and manufacture of methamphetamine; and offences not listed in the Schedule but where the defendant elects a jury trial.

There is no centralised agency responsible for conducting prosecutions or making prosecution decisions in New Zealand. This lack of a centralized prosecution authority is unique compared to many common law countries.

=== Concerns about police acting as prosecutors ===
Academics have expressed concerns that prosecutors who are trained police officers are unable to be fully independent or impartial. Officers in this role may struggle to be impartial due to occupational pressures, their loyalty to police colleagues and adherence to the police culture and worldview. Emeritus Professor, Andrew Ashworth, at Oxford University describes police culture as having

- a high level of police solidarity (involving strong support for colleagues' decisions and a 'blue code of silence'.)
- a macho image (involving an emphasis on physicality and supporting each other),
- rule flexibility (the idea that rules may need to be bent to get results), and
- a sense of mission (requiring officers to conduct themselves in the proper way - 'their way').

As a result, the dual role that police prosecutors play in New Zealand carries risks of bias, conflicts of interest, and challenges in maintaining prosecutorial independence - which may affect their objectivity in deciding whether to prosecute, amend, or discontinue cases.

== The New Zealand court system ==
=== Delays in court processes ===
The time taken for criminal cases to come to court is a critical factor in determining whether or not people consider that the justice system is just and fair. Court hearings and trials in New Zealand are frequently delayed, with delays ranging from several months to, in some cases, two to three years for trials—particularly in the District Court. More than 140,000 court appearances have been delayed since March 2020 due to the pandemic and its aftereffects. Jury trials now take an average of nearly 500 days to completion. In Northland, murder trials may take over two years to come to court.

A number of factors have come together to contribute to these delays:

- The Covid pandemic caused the suspension of jury trials and other court proceedings, resulting in a backlog of tens of thousands of cases that the system is still working to clear.
- Frequent adjournments may be required due to the unavailability of key participants, the need for special applications (such as for vulnerable witnesses), and delays in the process related to file quality or failure by the police to follow disclosure obligations.
- Increasingly, defendants in serious cases are opting for jury trials, especially for offences carrying a potential lengthy prison sentence. Jury trials are more complex and resource-intensive, requiring the coordination of 12 jurors, which adds to scheduling difficulties and lengthens wait times.
- When judges become tied up with lengthy trials, this causes a backlog for both judge-alone and jury trials.
- There is also a shortage of judges, and in some districts a shortage of available courtrooms.

=== Shortage of specialist reports ===
In 2024, over 50,000 New Zealanders appeared in court and received a criminal conviction. In order to deliver the fair treatment that justice requires, judges may request background information about these defendants prior to sentencing. The bulk of this information comes from pre-sentence reports, comprehensive alcohol and drug assessments and mental health assessments. Until the current government cancelled legal aid funding for cultural reports in 2024, judges used to receive a growing number of these as well.

- Pre-sentence reports:

The bulk of information that judges receive comes from presentence reports (known as Provision of Advice to Court PAC) written by probation officers. These are mandated by Section 26(1) of the Sentencing Act (2002) and an integral part of the sentencing process, and judges receive approximately 30,000 PAC reports every year.

However, both judges and lawyers have expressed concerns that these reports are too brief, repetitive and formulaic, and tend to rely on "cut and paste" language that fails to capture the gravity of the offending or the complexity of the offender's circumstances. This has led to a perception that the reports do not always provide the depth of analysis needed to guide sentencing, particularly for serious offences. A study from 2021 “highlighted how common it is for probation officers’ negative perceptions (about defendants) and/or inaccurate or incorrect information to be presented to the court.”

- Alcohol & drug (AOD) assessments:

Judges also receive a limited number of comprehensive alcohol and drug assessments each year - authorised under section 25 of the Sentencing Act, 2002. AOD assessments are not mandatory even though judges estimate that up to 80% of the 60,000 offenders who appear in court each year, present with substance abuse problems. They can be requested by judges or defence lawyers and may be funded by legal aid. However, the number of AOD assessments supplied to judges each year is tiny. In 2023, legal aid funded only 179 AOD assessments. In 2024, it funded 461.

- Mental health reports

Judges also receive a small number of mental health reports under section 38 of the Criminal Procedure, Mentally Impaired Persons, Act (CPMIP), 2003. These are usually ordered by the judge when concerns arise that the defendant may be legally insane or unfit to stand trial. Researchers have found that over 60% of the 10,000 prisoners in New Zealand present with an underlying mental health disorder, but only about 1,200 prisoners have a mental health assessment in any given year when they appear in court. Forensic psychiatrists who write these reports are so busy that lengthy delays (up to 19 months) have led to cases being dismissed.

- Cultural reports

Section 27 of the Sentencing Act says “the offender may request the court to hear any person called by the offender to speak on personal, family, whanau, community, and cultural background of offender”. This provision was rarely used until 2018 when Chief District Court Judge, Jan-Marie Doogue, urged court officials to use section 27 to take “a more comprehensive approach at sentencing.” This development was endorsed by the current Chief District Court Judge, Heemi Taumaunu, in 2020 in his proposal to introduce solution focussed judging to every district court in the country. His initiative, known as Te Ao Mārama is largely premised on "improving the quality of information judicial officers receive to inform their decisions."

In response to this judicial encouragement, defence lawyers started asking for more and more cultural reports on offenders. These were funded by legal aid, and in 2023, approximately 2,500 cultural reports were provided to judges. However, in 2024, the coalition government abolished legal aid funding. Justice Minister, Paul Goldsmith claimed that cultural reports had become a cottage industry for the writers "costing the taxpayers millions with no benefits to the real victims of crime".

== Integrity and miscarriages of justice ==
The justice system is required to protect the rights of individuals, and treat citizens fairly and impartially. However, the New Zealand system has been responsible for numerous miscarriages of justice in the last few years including cases such as David Bain, Aaron Farmer, Peter Ellis, David Dougherty, Teina Pora, Alan Hall, David Lyttle, Gail Maney and Stephen Stone. Other controversial cases that are still pending include Scott Watson, Mark Lundy and Shaun Allen.

However, these are high-profile cases that have received extensive publicity. The Ministry of Justice advises that 841 people have had their convictions quashed in the last ten years, including 36 people convicted of homicide and related offences.

Concerns about these miscarriages (and other cases) in New Zealand have been raised by judges, legal scholars, official commissions, and independent review bodies. These concerns focus on the risk to the integrity of police prosecutions and the justice system, particularly in cases involving police misconduct, unreliable evidence, or inadequate review mechanisms.

When Alan Hall's conviction was overturned 37 years after his wrongful conviction for murder, Tim McKinnel said “I think we need to ask some pretty serious questions about not just how the police have failed – as they have – but how the Crown failed, how Crown Law failed, how the judiciary failed – because they did – and how the whole system was able to let down not only somebody as vulnerable as Alan Hall, but the Easton family". He points out that when it comes to miscarriages of justice in New Zealand: "We're seeing the same series of issues arising again and again." He said the police develop myopia and doggedly pursue confessions, which, with a vulnerable suspect often leads to false confessions.

=== Criminal Case Review Commission ===
In response to concerns about the number of wrongful convictions in New Zealand, in 2020, the Criminal Cases Review Commission was established. One particular reason for concern was that applications for a Royal prerogative of mercy were made to the Ministry of Justice which was not sufficiently independent of the Crown or the judiciary. Another concern was that historically, the Royal prerogative of mercy process received very few applications from Māori and Pacific people, who are over-represented in the justice system. Only 11-16% of applications came from Māori and Pacific peoples, even though they make up more than 60% of the prison population.

As at July 2025, the commission had received a total of 545 applications from individuals claiming wrongful convictions, nearly 100 of which were homicide cases. Only four have been referred back to the courts for further consideration, representing 1.3% of all applications. Referral rates back to the courts by similar Commissions in England are around 3%; Scotland at 5%; and 16% in Norway. One of the reasons the NZ Commission has been slow is due to a high turnover of staff. If an investigator who was looking into a particular case resigns, a new researcher has to start all over again.

== Rehabilitation failures ==
=== The Corrections Department ===
The Corrections Act 2004 lists four purposes of the Corrections system. One of these is: "assisting in the rehabilitation of offenders and the reintegration of persons under control or supervision into the community... through the provision of programmes and other interventions."

Corrections offers a range of rehabilitation programmes in prison. This includes addiction treatment in Drug Treatment Programmes (DTP), a special treatment unit for violent offenders (STURP), a medium intensity rehabilitation programme (MIRP), short rehabilitation programmes (SRP), and a kaupapa Māori rehabilitative programme (Mauri Tū Pae).

Effectiveness

The Corrections Department claims its rehabilitation programmes are effective. In 2018, Dr Peter Johnston, Director of Analysis and Research, Department of Corrections said: “The Department has been achieving very promising gains though these programmes.” That year, Corrections offered eleven rehabilitation programmes with an average reduction in reoffending of only 6%. The effectiveness of these programmes has declined even further since then.

- In 2023: Corrections’ Annual Report listed eight different prison-based interventions. The average reduction in reoffending in the first 12 months on release from prison was only 3.6%.
- In 2024: the Annual Report showed the average reduction was even less – 2.3%.

=== Recidivism rates ===
If the justice system was more effective at rehabilitating criminal offenders, this would do more to reduce crime, enhance social order and make New Zealanders feel safer. However, when prisoners are released in New Zealand, they tend to reoffend at high rates.

Reconviction Rates (Any New Conviction)

- After 2 years: Approximately 56.5% of people with previous convictions are reconvicted within 2 years of release.
- After 4 years: For recidivist offenders, reconviction rates can reach 74–80% over 48 months, depending on ethnicity and gender.

Reimprisonment Rates (Return to Prison)

- After 1 year: 26% of released prisoners are reimprisoned within 12 months.
- After 2 years: 37% are reimprisoned within 24 months.
- After 3 years: 44% are reimprisoned within 36 months.
- After 4 years: 49% are reimprisoned within 48 months

=== Specialist courts ===
A number of specialist courts have been established in New Zealand to tackle particular problems and try alternative approaches at sentencing. This includes the Family Court, the Youth Court, the Special Circumstances Court, Family Violence Courts, and the Alcohol and Other Drug Treatment Courts. These courts often use a solution-focused or therapeutic approach, aiming to address underlying causes of legal issues through active judicial involvement and community resources.

==== The Alcohol and Other Drug Treatment Court ====
However, the Alcohol and Other Drug Treatment Court (AODTC) is the only one of these courts that significantly reduces reoffending. The purpose of the AODTC is to reduce the use of imprisonment by offering offenders with addictions the opportunity to attend treatment in the community. It was set up as a pilot in 2012 and made permanent in 2019. To be admitted to the court, defendants have to be formally assessed as substance dependent (i.e. they have an addiction) by a qualified clinician, be a recidivist offender facing a prison sentence of up to three years, and plead guilty.

The AODTC programme takes around 18 months to complete. It has been evaluated more extensively than any other justice related intervention in New Zealand. In 2017, Andrew Little who became Minister of Justice, said drug courts would be “rolled out across New Zealand in 2018”. But he wanted one more evaluation done by the Ministry of Justice. In 2019, the Ministry published a Quantitative Analysis and a Cost Benefit Analysis of the AODTC.

Reduced reoffending via the AODTC:

Compared with a control group of matched offenders, the Ministry found that graduates reoffended:

- 86% less in the first year after completing treatment
- 58% less within two years after completing treatment
- 42% less within three years after completing treatment
- 20% less within four years after completing treatment

Reduced imprisonment via the AODTC

Compared with a control group of matched offenders, the Ministry found that graduates were sent back to prison:

- 100% less in the first 12 months after completing treatment
- 92% less within two years after completing treatment
- 78% less within three years after completing treatment
- 31% less within four years after completing treatment

Despite these remarkable results, which are up to 20 times better than reductions achieved by Corrections rehabilitation programmes in prison, only one additional drug has been established - in Hamilton.

=== The Ministry of Justice ===
The justice sector includes the Police, the Courts, the Serious Fraud Office, Crown Law, the Corrections Department and Oranga Tamariki. The Ministry of Justice is the lead agency responsible for coordinating the activities of these agencies, developing justice policy, providing advice to Ministers and Cabinet, and leading major legislative and constitutional initiatives. It is the only agency in New Zealand's public sector that works across all three arms of government: the executive, the legislature, and providing support to the independent judiciary.

As such, the Ministry has the responsibility of leading these other agencies in their efforts to reduce crime and reoffending in New Zealand. The Ministry's websites says:

"The Ministry's work in this system includes bringing a crime reduction focus to whole-of-government work to reduce the social, health and educational risk factors that can lead to crime. This includes alcohol and other drug-related issues, or young people disengaged from education or training."

The Ministry's role in rehabilitating offenders

Despite their own evaluation of the AODTC describing how effective the AODTC is at reducing reoffending and reimprisonment, in 2022, the Ministry presented a 120-page document to Parliament titled: Long term Briefing Insights: Imprisonment in New Zealand, 1960-2050. On behalf of the justice sector, this Briefing addresses the question: What works to keep people out of prison? and claims: "Traditionally, prison-based rehabilitation programmes have consistently delivered better results than community-based programmes in New Zealand."

AODTC judge, Lisa Tremewan, disagrees. She says the programme "demanded commitment, but brought exceptional results." Supporting the role out of drug court to other districts, an addiction counsellor said: "If we had 20 drug courts, that would keep around 1000 defendants a year out of prison... a potential saving of $150 million per annum."
