= Te Ao Mārama (disambiguation) =

Te Ao Mārama is a concept of the world in Māori traditional knowledge. Te Ao Mārama may also refer to:

== Places ==
- Te Ao Marama, the Ngāi Tahu name for Lake Benmore
- Te Ao Marama, a wharenui at Onetahua Kōkiri Marae in Tākaka, Golden Bay / Mohua
- Te Ao Mārama, the wharekai (dining hall) at Te Ao Hou Marae, Aramoho, Whanganui
- Te Ao Mārama School in Flagstaff, Hamilton
- Te Ao Mārama, the bicultural atrium space at the Auckland War Memorial Museum

== Music ==
- Te Ao Mārama (EP) a 2021 extended play by Lorde
- "Te Ao Mārama / Solar Power", the Māori language version of the song "Solar Power" by Lorde

== Other ==
- Te Ao Mārama a current affairs television programme on Māori Television
