= Law and order (politics) =

Demands for a strict criminal justice system

"Law and order" is an approach focusing on harsher enforcement and penalties as ways to reduce crime. Penalties for perpetrators of disorder may include longer terms of imprisonment, mandatory sentencing, three-strikes laws and even capital punishment in some countries. Those who support the "Law and Order" movement view harsh punishment as a deterrent for crime.

Despite the widespread popularity of "law and order" ideas and approaches from the 1960s to the 1980s exemplified by presidential candidates including Richard Nixon and Ronald Reagan running successfully on a "tough-on-crime" platform, statistics on crime showed a significant increase in crime throughout the 1970s and 1980s instead, and crime rates only began declining from the 1990s onwards. To differing extents, crime has also been a prominent issue in Canadian, British, Australian, South African, French, German, and New Zealand politics.

Opponents of the "law and order" movement make the argument that harsh punishment is unsuccessful in deterring crime, is unequally applied to disadvantaged groups, and does not address underlying or systemic causes of crime. They furthermore credit it with facilitating greater militarisation of police and contributing to mass incarceration in the United States.

== Political issue in the United States ==
=== Origins ===
The concept and phrase "law and order" has been around in the United States since at least the 1840s. In 1842 the Law and Order Party of Rhode Island was founded after the Dorr Rebellion in the state of Rhode Island. The Dorr Rebellion began because in 1840, Rhode Island still used the King's Charter of 1663 as its constitution, which held that only landowners with $134 in property could vote, effectively disenfranchised 60 percent of the state's freemen. In 1841 and 1842, Rhode Island Governor Samuel Ward King faced opposition from Thomas Wilson Dorr and his followers in the Rhode Island Suffrage Party who wanted to extend suffrage to a wider group of citizens. Governor King put together a Law and Order coalition of Whigs and conservative Democrats to put down the opposition. King and his coalition declared martial law on May 4, 1842. The state militia ended the rebellion by the end of the summer of 1842. The Law and Order Party were initially opposed to extending suffrage, but they realized that the 1663 charter was archaic. After the rebellion, it became clear that they needed to compromise. In November 1842, they drafted a "Law And Order Constitution" which extended the right to vote to all native-born adult males, including black men. Effective May 1843, this new Constitution replaced the old King's Charter of 1663.

=== Usage of the term in the twentieth century ===
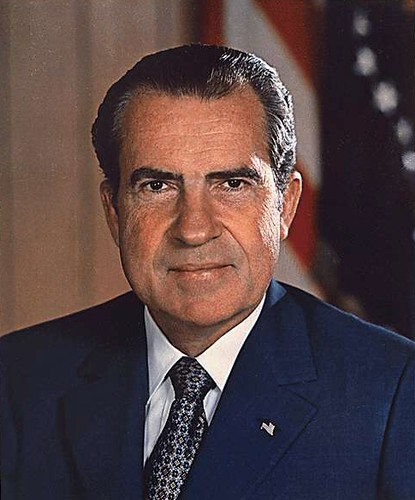
Richard Nixon was a proponent of law and order policies during his numerous presidential campaigns.

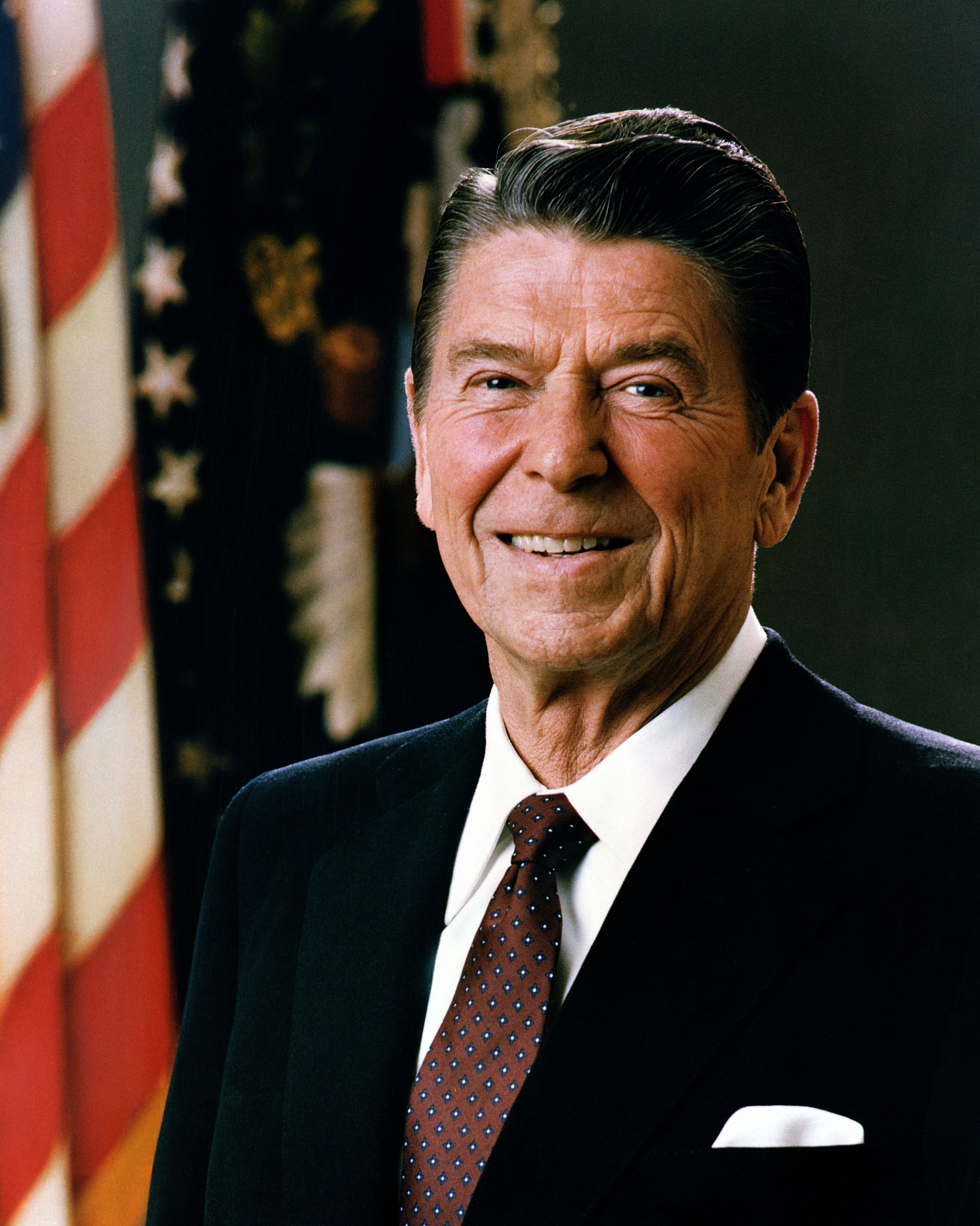
Former President Ronald Reagan, in relation to the law and order movement

The phrase "law and order" became a powerful national political theme in the United States during the late 1960s. The first prominent American politician to use the term in this era was Alabama governor George Wallace, who used the phrase as a political slogan and racial dog whistle in his 1968 presidential campaign. Other leading proponents were two Republicans, the governor of California Ronald Reagan and presidential candidate Richard Nixon. Nixon used the term to appeal to various demographic groups, including working-class white ethnics in northern cities. Nixon attempted to discredit the Democratic Party in the eyes of these voters, blaming it for being soft on crime and rioters.

Previously, other politicians had used the term "law and order", although their use of the term was much less systematic and frequent than that of Wallace, Nixon, or Reagan. Political demand for "law and order" has been made much earlier before, by John Adams in the 1780s and 1790s. It was a political slogan in Kentucky around 1900 after the assassination of Governor William Goebel. The term was once used by Barry Goldwater in his run for president in 1964.

The number of prisoners tripled from 500,000 in 1980 to 1.5 million in 1994. Conservatives at the state level built many more prisons and convicts served much longer terms, with less parole. Since 2021, the "tough on crime" movement has returned, with many US states and the federal government doubling down on zero tolerance enforcement and harsh prison sentences. Even many Democrats have followed, with voters and elected officials in numerous "blue" states reversing positive reforms and approving severe penalties.

Critics of law-and-order politics commonly point to actual and potential abuses of judicial and police powers, including police brutality and misconduct, racial profiling, prison overcrowding, and miscarriages of justice. As an example, they argue that while crime in New York City dropped under Mayor Giuliani, reports of police brutality increased during the same period. This period included the fatal shootings of Amadou Diallo and Sean Bell, and the Abner Louima incident. An example of another criticism is the zero tolerance policies that would involve police tactics like stop and frisk that disproportionately impacted black and brown individuals. Stop and frisk is one of the main reasons why Black and Brown Individuals were disproportionately arrested at higher rates. With the Black and Latinx communities making up the majority of all stops, despite being minorities in terms of population.

=== Riots ===
Although the Civil Rights Act of 1964 forbade all discrimination on the basis of race, in 1965 police brutality towards a black man during a traffic stop resulted in a major riot among the black community in the Watts neighborhood of Los Angeles, the government's response to which is considered by many to have been a failure. Indeed, every summer from 1964 through 1970 was a "long hot summer", though 1967 is particularly known as such, as 159 riots occurred that year. Additionally, after the April 4, 1968 murder of Martin Luther King, a new wave of riots broke out in over 100 cities, with nights of violence against police and looting and burning of local white-owned businesses. The inner neighborhoods of many major cities, such as Detroit, Los Angeles, Newark and New York, were burned out. National Guard and Army troops were called out. At one point machine gun units were stationed on the steps of the Capitol building in Washington to prevent rioters from burning it down.

=== Crimes ===
In the post-war period, there was a dramatic rise in violent street crime, including drug-related murders, as well as armed robberies, rapes and violent assaults. Inner city neighborhoods became a breeding ground for violent and drug-related crimes due to the economic shift, such as disorganization and overt poverty, which weakened the welfare of the neighborhoods, thus causing and giving option for the growth of the drug market. The number of violent crimes more than tripled from 288,000 in 1960 (including 9,110 murders) to 1,040,000 in 1975 (including 20,510 murders). Then the numbers levelled off. In response to sharply rising rates of crime in the 1960s, treatment of criminal offenders, both accused and convicted, became a highly divisive topic in the 1968 U.S. presidential election. Republican vice presidential candidate Spiro Agnew, then the governor of Maryland, often used the expression. Agnew and Nixon won and were reelected in 1972.

Notorious crimes by released murderers that occurred in the 1980s and 1990s are often credited with influencing politics regarding the concept of "law and order". Most notably, the release of the murderer Willie Horton who committed a rape and a rampage of severe violence when he was released is generally credited with favoring the election of President George H. W. Bush over the man who released him, Massachusetts governor Michael Dukakis. Bush beat Dukakis by a margin of both popular and electoral college votes that has not been surpassed since 1988. The release of the murderer Reginald McFadden, who went on a serial murder and rape spree, by the acting governor of Pennsylvania, Mark Singel, may have been a contributing factor in the 1994 election of Pennsylvania governor Tom Ridge, in which Ridge defeated Singel by a margin of 45% to 39%.

=== Results ===
Advocates of stricter policies toward crime and those accused of crime have won many victories since the rise of tough-on-crime policy. Highlights include stringent laws dealing with the sale and use of illicit drugs. For example, the Rockefeller drug laws passed in New York state in 1973 and later, laws mandating tougher sentences for repeat offenders, such as the three-strikes laws adopted by many U.S. states starting in 1993 and the re-legalization of the death penalty in several states. Opponents of these and similar laws have often accused advocates of racism. Civil rights groups have steadfastly opposed the trend toward harsher measures generally. The law-and-order issue caused a deep rift within the Democratic Party in the late 1960s and 1970s, and this rift was seen by many political scientists as a major contributing factor in Ronald Reagan's two successful presidential runs in 1980 and 1984. In both elections, millions of registered Democrats voted for Reagan, and they collectively became known as "Reagan Democrats". Many of these voters eventually changed their party registration and became Republicans, especially in the South.

Although violent crimes are the primary focus of law-and-order advocates, quality-of-life crimes are sometimes also included under the law-and-order umbrella, particularly in local elections. Rudy Giuliani's win and reelection as mayor of New York in the 1990s are attributed to his tough-on-crime policy and Broken windows policing. This involved going after low-level offenses with the idea they would deter escalations in crime. Homicide and burglary dropped 73% and 66% respectively from 1990-1999. A focus on quality-of-life crimes is also widely cited as propelling Gavin Newsom to victory over a more liberal opponent in the 2003 San Francisco mayoral election of 2003. Richard Riordan also became Los Angeles' new mayor in 1993 for the first time in 20 years after Tom Bradley retired. Platt (1995) argues that the intensity of law-and-order campaigns represents a significant shift in criminal justice that involves modernization and increased funding for police technology and personnel, privatization of security services and surveillance, higher rates of incarceration, and greater racial inequality in security and punishment. The phrase was used repeatedly by Donald Trump in his presidential nomination acceptance speech in 2016, which Salon.com interpreted as an intentional reference to Nixon's use of the term. Politico Magazine reported that the rhetoric was at odds with the crime rates being at 50-year lows in the country.

Politicians who have advocated "law and order" are sometimes criminals. In 2009, Pennsylvania juvenile court judges Mark Ciavarella and Michael Conahan pleaded guilty in the "kids for cash" scandal of accepting money from private prison industry officials in exchange for sentencing over 1,000 youths to prison terms for minor offenses. Maricopa County Sheriff Joe Arpaio, a role model for tougher sentencing campaigners for his hardline corrections policies, was found in contempt of court in 2017 for defying the court and continuing racial profiling and illegal immigration patrols.

Jeremy Mayer, at the Schar School of Policy and Government at George Mason University, has argued that the term is used as a way to emphasize racial backlash in politics without appearing racist. By 2020, political commentators and left-leaning groups in the United States were increasing criticism of the term as hypocritical and a dog whistle in response to the use of the term by Donald Trump and his supporters during the George Floyd and Black Lives Matter protest, with one outlet stating "[t]hroughout this nation's history, appeals to law and order have been as much about defending privilege as dealing with crime." In the wake of the 2021 United States Capitol attack, criticism from columnists and outlets mounted on Republican politicians seen as "abandoning" or otherwise being hypocritical in the claim as the "law and order party."

Despite common rhetoric about varying approaches by the Republican Party and the Democratic Party on crime, there is no detectable effect of different approaches or outcomes between cities led by Democratic politicians and Republican politicians. According to a 2025 study, there is "no evidence that mayoral partisanship affects police employment or expenditures, police force or leadership demographics, overall crime rates, or numbers of arrests."

== Usage in the United Kingdom ==
"Law and order" has been a political rallying call in the United Kingdom, particularly under Margaret Thatcher (Leader of the Conservative Party 1975–1990; Prime Minister 1979–1990). The term was parodied as "Laura Norder", and entered popular culture, for example in the sarcastic song "Law & Order" by the Tom Robinson Band (1979). A slew of crime legislation was passed under Thatcher's government including the Criminal Justice Acts of 1982 and 1988. Other laws passed included The Prosecution of Offenses Act and Drug Trafficking Offences Act of 1985 and 1986 among others during and following Thatcher's reign. Thatcher's reign and policy implementation coincided with an increase of crime during the '90s.

== Usage in Latin America ==
=== El Salvador ===
El Salvador had been plagued by gang violence for years by Mara Salvatrucha (MS-13) and Barrio 18. These gangs emerged in El Salvador after their formation in the United States and subsequent deportation of violent offenders to El Salvador unbeknown to the Salvadoran authorities. President Nayib Bukele came into office and 2019 and used the military and expansion of the national police (PNC) to bring down crime. After a spree on gang violence in late March 2022, the Salvadoran legislature approved Bukele's request for a "State of Exception". It's immediate effects were limiting the ability to gather and extending the time suspects could be held in detention.

In December 2022, Bukele's policy of Cerco Militares or cordon-and-search operations came into full force. A combined force of 10,000 from the PNC and armed forces surrounded the town of Soyapango and set up check points while they searched the town for gang members. On January 31, 2023, the Centro de Confinamiento del Terrorismo (CECOT) was inaugurated. It can hold up to 40,000 inmates and is made for holding gang members who the government considers terrorists.

=== Results ===
By February 2025, the State of Exception has led to the imprisonment of over 80,000 people. Which is about 2% of El Salvador's population, giving it the highest incarceration rate in the world. El Salvador went from being one of the most dangerous countries in the world with 6,656 homicides in 2015 to a record-low 114 homicides and a per-capita rate of 1.9 per 100,000 in 2024. This was the lowest in Latin America that year. Time Magazine wrote an article with the headline "How Nayib Bukele's 'Iron Fist' Has Transformed El Salvador" highlighting the security gains made during his administration. The reduction in violence has also led to rapidly expanding economy with El Salvador reporting the highest YoY economic growth in Central America in 2025 at 5.4%.

=== Ecuador ===
On January 9 2024, Ecuador's president Daniel Noboa declared an "internal armed conflict" following the prison escape of the country's most notorious gang leader. He issued Executive Decree 111 which declared 22 separate gangs terrorist organizations and began a 60-day state of emergency. Noboa had previously announced the purchase and imminent arrival of offshore barges and construction on multiple mega-prisons to house gang leaders in an effort to separate them from the general population. Two months into Noboa's presidency violent crime had reached historic levels including 40 homicides per 100,000. Homicides in Ecuador rose 574% between 2019 and 2023.

Following President Noboa's announcement the military took control of the prisons and set up checkpoints within the country. In February 2024, referendums saw Ecuadorians pass a slew of constitutional amendments to enhance the country's security operations. These measures included, allowing the extradition of Ecuadorians, permitting the Army to work in conjunction with the police during non-emergencies, and the creation of specialized courts to address constitutional questions.

=== Results ===
Ecuador initially experienced strong results from its security measures with the homicide rate dropping from 46 to 39 per 100,000 from 2023 to 2024. However, 2025 was followed by a record homicide rate of 50 per 100,000, making Ecuador the most violent country in Latin America. Violent crime and fatalities amongst youth 10-19 also surged 68% in 2025. The crackdown strategy has caused gangs to adapt so while formal reports of exortion have dropped by as much as 40% rackets on small businesses and schools have increased significantly. Groups like Human Rights Watch have accused Noboa's administration of several and severe human rights violations. Surge deployments have shown promising results with homicide rates dropping 35% in cities like Duran. However, organizations like Insight Crime argue that the underlying causes have yet to be addressed.

=== Chile ===
Chile's law and order model has existed since 1927 centered on the Carabineros, with the motto "Order and homeland." Created by Decree No. 2,484, Carlos Ibáñez Del Campo formalized the Carabineros as a separate institution. They serve as the country's centralized and militarized police force within the country. They were also a strong feature during Chile's militarized government and the Pinochet regime. Chile's Carabineros have consistently enjoyed success in keeping crime low and popular support in Chile. They are known for their low levels of corruption with 94% of Chileans in 2008 reporting no when asked if they or anyone they lived with had paid a bride to police in the last 12 months.

Chile due to adapting technology and cross-border violence has undergone efforts since the 1990s modernize and adapt its policing tactics. They implemented the Quadrant Plan which involves spreading police resources into urban quadrants. This introduced community policing while keeping the military ethos tied to the Carabineros. In 2014, Chile began targeting "micro-trafficking" in effort to target low-level dealers and street sales. In 2023, Gabriel Boric's government passed new anti-crime legislation known as the Naín-Retamal laws. The legislation strengthens the penalties for crimes against police officers and grants officers new abilities to shoot in self-defense. With the election of right-wing President Jose Antonio Kast, Chile has doubled down on its tough on crime measures. Hundreds gang leaders were transferred to La Laguna a prison built to enforce strict monitoring and isolation of inmates. Kast has also proposed the ability for Congress to grant the president ability to impose a renewable 120 day State of Exception.

=== Results ===
Historically, Chile has historically maintained some of Latin America's lowest homicide rates. However, crime began to increase from 2020-2022 with the arrival of transnational groups such as, Tren de Aragua. Violent crime and homicide rates pale in comparison to nearby countries such as Ecuador that have 4-5 times the homicide rate of Chile. Crime began to plateau and finally fall with Chile experiencing a 12.7% drop in their homicide rate from 2023 to 2024 Hardline measures and figures have experienced broad support in Chile with 45% of Chileans supporting abolishing all public and private liberties to control crime compared to 16% opposed and 80% of Chileans held a positive view of El Salvador President Nayib Bukele.

== The Caribbean ==
=== Jamaica ===
Jamaica has been plagued by gang-related violent crime since its independence in 1962 due to drugs, arms trafficking, and CIA operations, Urban communities were informally divided into garrisons where gang-leaders local control over impoverished populations. In 1974 Jamaica pushed through anticrime legislation including the "Suppression of Crime Act" that created indefinite detention for possessing illegal guns, all guns not held by permit-holders were outlawed, and gun-related scenes were censored from media shown in the country. The legislation while effective lowering crime it created a culture of violent suppression and human rights concerns, including "squalid" prison conditions and mass roundups by police.The act was repealed in 1994 and popular police personalities were subsequently removed. This gave freedom of operation back to many gangs and coincided with the deportation of many gang members from the US and UK back to Jamaica.

Jamaica began rediscovering its strong stance on crime in the 2010s but not without turmoil. In 2010 800 soldiers and 370 police officers stormed Tivoli Gardens to capture Christopher “Dudus” Coke to secure his extradition to the United States. 70 civilians were killed and there were 15 extrajudicial killings during the raid. In August of 2010 the Independent Commission of Investigations was created to prosecute security forces for civilian shootings. In 2014 Jamaica passed the Anti-Gang Act which criminalized membership, recruitment, and logistics used by gangs. The 2017 Zone of Special Operations Law which look to empower residents by encouraging land ownership and economic empowerment in conjunction with localized state of emergencies. In 2022 Jamaica passed the Firearms Act which created mandatory minimums for illegal gun possession and trafficking.

=== Results ===
Starting in the 2020s Jamaica experienced success in its fight against organized crime. In 2023, a Jamaican court convicted an infamous gang leader along with 14 other defendants in its largest ever gang trial and first successful use of the 2014 Anti-Gang Act. After a stark peak of 53 murders per 100,000 in 2022 Jamaica saw an 8% decline in 2023 and a 15% decline in robberies. In 2025, Jamaica experienced a 40% decline in its murder rate compared to 2024. Murders in July of 2026 were down 23% year over year with shootings dropping 28% and 25% decline in robberies. This was also accompanied by an 111% jump in the murder clearance rate.

== Asia ==
=== Singapore ===
Lee Kuan Yew, the first prime minister of Singapore established reputation and regime of law and order during his tenure, 1959-1990. This started with restrictions of political expression and dissent. Yew and his People's Action Party (PAP) launched operation "Coldstore" which resulted in the arrest of 113 left-wing activists. This was in response to concerns that the opposition, Barisan Sosialis were fomenting violent communist revolution. Yew tightened his control on power and set strict aesthetic standards for Singapore. His party passed the Vandalism act of 1966 which banned graffiti and thereby the defacing and damaging of property in the country. A standard punishment vandalism involved a fine, imprisonment, and 3 to 8 strokes from a cane. In 1973, parliament passed the Misuse of Drugs Act which mandates the death penalty for possessing or importing more than 500 grams of cannabis.

Singapore's tough-on-crime policy continued after Lee Kuan Yew stepped down in 1990. This included the banning of chewing gum in 1992 due to the issues it caused with train doors. Singapore quickly gained international media attention for its stringent enforcement of their rules. Despite President Bill Clinton requesting clemency, American, 18-year-old Michael Fay received 4 cane strokes for a vandalism charge in 1994. In the 2000s Singapore continued and strengthened much of its no-tolerance policy. The legislature passed the Terrorism (Suppression of Financing) Act of 2002 gave the state expanded powers for obtaining warrants, seizure, and forced forfeiture of assets. In 2010, another high profile incident, Oliver Fricker was sentenced to seven months in prison and three lashes of the cane for breaking into a train depot and painting graffiti.

=== Results ===
Singapore's tough-on-crime policies have spared it from the problems affecting many of its neighbors. Transparency International ranked Singapore as the leas corrupt country in Asia and the 5th-least corrupt in the world. Violent crime and theft are characterized as rare by the UK Home Office when discussing Singapore. In 2021, Singapore was ranked as the 3rd safest city in the world. In a survey of regional visitors to Singapore 82% reported feeling safe and 87% said they would trust a Singaporean police officer.Despite its restrictions on criminal activity, Singapore has positioned itself as a haven for free enterprise. In 2022, Singapore was the leading financial hub in Asia and only third to New York and London.

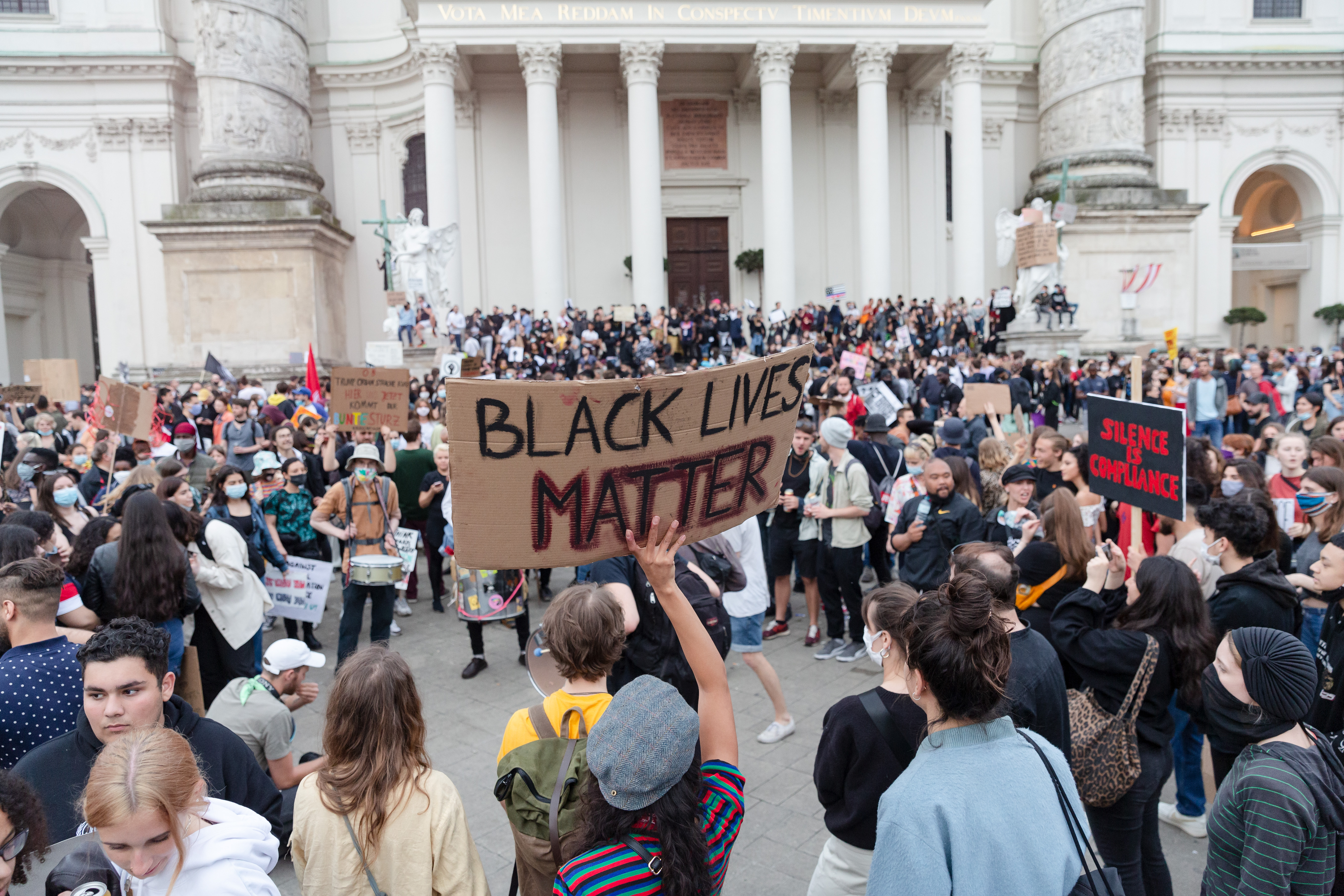
Black Lives Matter protest in relation to criticism of the law and order movement

== Order without law ==
In a limited number of cases, it can be argued that order can be maintained without law. Robert Ellickson, in his book Order without Law: How Neighbors Settle Disputes, concluded that it is sometimes possible for order to be maintained without law in small groups. Ellickson examined rural Shasta County, California, in which cattle openly roam and sometimes destroy crops. He found that since social norms call for the cattle owner to pay for the damaged crops, the disputes are settled without law. According to Ellickson, not only is the law not necessary to maintain order in this case, but it is more efficient for social norms to govern the settling of disputes.

== See also ==
- Autocratic legalism
- Back to Basics (campaign)
- Culture war
- Peace, order and good government (Commonwealth)
- Peace (common-law concept)
- Penal harm
- Penal populism
- Three-strikes law
- War on drugs
- Wedge issue
- Zero tolerance
- Zucht und Ordnung
