= Neighbourhood Watch (United Kingdom) =

Community crime-prevention partnership in the UK

- Formation: 1982; 42 years ago in Mollington, Cheshire, United Kingdom
- Headquarters: WG07, Vox Studios, 1-45 Durham Street, Vauxhall, SE11 5JH
- Members: 2.3m (2022)
- CEO: John Hayward-Cripps
- Website: https://www.ourwatch.org.uk/

Neighbourhood Watch in the United Kingdom is the largest voluntary crime prevention movement covering England and Wales with upwards of 2.3 million household members. The charity brings neighbours together to create strong, friendly and active communities in which crime can be tackled. Neighbourhood Watch Network is the umbrella organisation supported by the Home Office to support Neighbourhood Watch groups and individuals across England and Wales.

Neighbourhood Watch groups work in partnership with the police, corporate companies with aligned values, voluntary organisations and individuals who want to improve their communities. Neighbourhood Watch aims to help people protect themselves and their properties and to reduce the fear of crime by means of improved home security, greater vigilance, accurate reporting of suspicious incidents and fostering a community spirit as well as tackling new forms of crime such as cybercrime.

== History ==
In 1964, 28-year-old Kitty Genovese was stabbed in New York outside her apartment. Two weeks after the murder it was rumored that 38 witnesses saw or heard the attack, but none of them called the police or came to her aid. This motivated a community response and the very first Neighbourhood Watch scheme was set up in New York, and in 1982 the first UK scheme was set up in Mollington, Cheshire by The local Crime Prevention Officer then Sgt Grahame John Andrews and was called Homewatch.

From there Neighbourhood Watch grew from strength to strength. Neighbourhood Watch representatives formed local, and wider, structured groups. In 2007, with the support of the police and the Home Office, the umbrella organisation for the movement, now known as Neighbourhood Watch Network, was established. Their focus was on building local Neighbourhood Watch community groups which liaised with the police and focused on reducing burglary and other home and personal crimes.

== Objectives ==
- To improve community safety generally including, e.g., fire safety
- To prevent crime by improving security, increasing vigilance, creating and maintaining a caring community and reducing opportunities for crime by increasing crime prevention awareness.
- To assist the police in detecting crime by promoting effective communication and the prompt reporting of suspicious and criminal activity.
- To reduce undue fear of crime by providing accurate information about risks and by promoting a sense of security and community spirit, particularly amongst the more vulnerable members of the community.
- To improve police/community liaison by providing effective communications through Neighbourhood Watch messaging systems including two-way radio (usually via a community radio repeater) to warn coordinators of local crime trends which they can disseminate to their scheme members, and by members informing the police of incidents when they occur.

== Schemes ==
Neighbourhood Watch schemes are run by their members and are often supported by the police and in many areas, a local Neighbourhood Watch Association.

Schemes can vary in size. A volunteer resident coordinator supervises the scheme and liaises with the police and other partners on information, messages and initiatives. It must be recognised that the scheme is a community initiative so success depends on what the members make of it.

The police can't deal with the problems and issues arising from crime and anti-social behavior alone; they need the help of the whole community. Neighbourhood Watch provides a way for local people to play an important part in addressing this balance and making their communities safer.

=== Coordinator ===
The role of a Neighbourhood Watch coordinator is to set up and maintain a Neighbourhood Watch scheme within a specific street, neighbourhood or area. Whilst each crime prevention coordinator may develop specific procedures, the following are suggested as the main duties which coordinators will need to manage.

- Encourage vigilance amongst scheme members and actively encourage the early reporting of suspicious incidents.
- Receive crime information from the Neighbourhood Watch messaging system and distribute these messages to scheme members.
- Encourage neighbours to join Neighbourhood Watch through the website to receive up to date messages on national campaigns and initiatives and member benefits.
- Encourage scheme members to be aware of and put into practice crime prevention measures, such as property marking and security devices.
- Keep a check on vulnerable households and provide advice to members about dealing with callers at the door.
- Circulate newsletters and other relevant information to scheme members.
- Welcome newcomers to the neighbourhood and invite them to be part of the scheme.
- Supply each scheme member with Neighbourhood Watch and crime prevention literature, such as Neighbourhood Watch window stickers.

These are the main tasks that would be expected of a coordinator, tasks will vary according to the needs of each individual neighbourhood.

=== Area coordinators ===
Some larger communities will also appoint area (and/or ward) coordinators forming a hierarchy who sit above other coordinators. The roles of the ward and area coordinators are not necessarily authoritative (may vary around the country), but they provide structure and cohesion for larger and more active watch schemes. These are typically more active roles to assist the other coordinators, organising coordinator meetings and neighbourhood meetings as well as being an extra link to the local police and Neighbourhood Watch Network. Like all other coordinators, these roles are voluntary and unpaid.

Most of these senior roles were historically taken by people who are in their 50s, 60s and 70s. Although they bring experience and maturity to Neighbourhood Watch some may identify it as a weakness as there is a lack of participation from younger generations. Homeownership tends to be conducive to active participation in Neighbourhood Watch groups as homeowners are more likely to invest time and energy into protecting their homes. However, membership demographics are starting to change with a shift in the younger generations towards as cybercrime becomes more relevant to homeowners and renters alike and the introduction of social media as a way of connecting communities. Younger generations are more interested in joining the movement and in taking on the roles traditionally done by elder people.

=== Neighbourhood Watch Network ===
Neighbourhood Watch Network is the umbrella charity for Neighbourhood Watch groups across England and Wales. It is funded by the Home Office and other partners and was established in 2007. It manages the official website for Neighbourhood Watch. The site includes crime toolkits, news, resources, campaign materials, inspirational advice and contact information.

== Criticisms ==
Neighbourhood Watch schemes have not been universally welcomed. Criticisms include:

- Used as a means of reducing policing cost by employing residents to undertake what may be considered police work
- It is unknown how much of an impact Neighbourhood Watch schemes have on their own and what proportion of the reduction is due to related schemes such as property markings and security services that are often part of neighbourhood watch schemes.
- It is unknown how Neighbourhood Watch schemes work and which aspects actually lead to crime reduction.
- Most schemes are in rich areas with relatively low crime rates and it is unclear whether it would have an effect in poorer areas.

== In popular culture ==
The highly-acclaimed film Hot Fuzz (2007) satirizes the "Neighborhood Watch Alliance" of the fictional village of Sandford, whose members take extraordinary measures for the "greater good" of preserving the village’s reputation.

== See also ==
- Neighborhood watch – US organisation
- Neighbourhood Support – New Zealand organisation
- Shomrim – Jewish organisation
