= Neighbourhood Support =

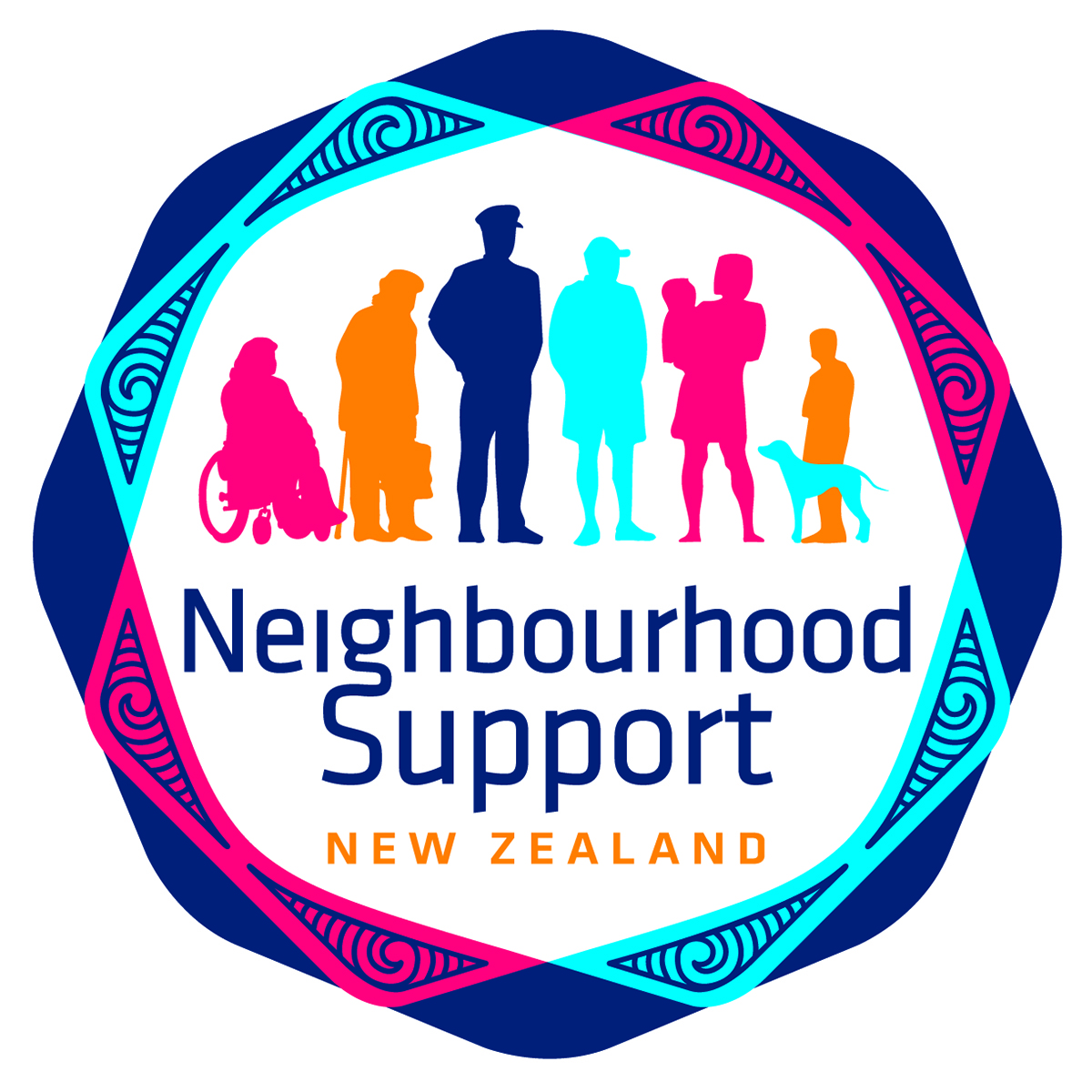

Neighbourhood Support is a term used, predominantly in New Zealand, to refer to schemes similar in intent to Neighbourhood Watch, with some additional objectives.

Neighbourhood Support is a community-led movement that brings people and neighbourhoods together to create safe, resilient and connected communities.

Neighbourhood Support works closely with New Zealand Police and a number of organisations and other partners to equip neighbourhoods to improve safety, be prepared for emergencies and support one another so that our communities are great places to live.

== History ==
Neighbourhood Watch was introduced to New Zealand as a crime prevention initiative in the late 1970s. The initiative evolved to become Neighbourhood Support New Zealand, a community-owned and managed organisation with a wide-ranging interest in crime prevention and community safety.

The national body of Neighbourhood Support, Neighbourhood Support New Zealand, became an Incorporated Society in 2000. In 2001 it signed a Memorandum of Understanding with the New Zealand Police. The purpose of the Memorandum of Understanding is to establish and promote a collaborative working relationship between Neighbourhood Support New Zealand Incorporated and the Police.

== Objectives ==
Neighbourhood Support aims to make homes, streets, neighbourhoods and communities safer and more caring places in which to live.

This is primarily achieved through the establishment of a "Neighbourhood Support Group", comprising anywhere from several to dozens of residential households in a single street or suburb. Groups throughout a suburb or a wider town or city area are then coordinated by a Neighbourhood Support New Zealand Member Organisation which are often a stand alone Trust or Incorporated Society, but may also be operated through a local Council. These organisations are usually run via a Neighbourhood Support Area Coordinator or Manager (either in a paid or voluntary position) as well as other volunteers including a Board or Trustees depending on the organisation's structure. Community Constables based at Police stations often also play a role in supporting their local Neighbourhood Support.

Households which are part of a Neighbourhood Support Group may meet regularly or only as needed, stay connected online or by email, host barbecues or events, volunteer to be a Street Contact, undertake some neighbourhood projects, or even start a separate group.

== Typical Scheme ==
The following description is based on the framework adopted in New Zealand but is similar in intent to schemes known as "Neighbourhood Watch" in other countries.

=== Neighbourhood Support National Body ===
Neighbourhood Support New Zealand is the national body that oversees all Neighbourhood Support New Zealand Member Organisations which span all 12 Police Districts and support over 220,000 households across the country.

=== Neighbourhood Support Group ===
Small clusters of households in a single street or adjoining houses in nearby streets form what is known as a "Neighbourhood Support Group". This can comprise anywhere from several to dozens of households in a single street or suburb.

Information about important community news, severe weather alerts, local crime, crime prevention and community safety advice is provided to neighbours through participation in a Neighbourhood Support Group. Members exchange contact details and valuable household information which is typically managed by their local Coordinator. They also meet as needed to discuss local issues or to simply stay in touch and build connections. Some groups may have regularly organised meetings or social functions.

Each group is usually supported by a "Street or Group Contact" person who is one of the members of the group. Larger groups may have several "Contact" persons. The role of the Street or Group Contact is to ensure that the group contact lists are correct and up-to-date as people arrive or leave the area, and contact lists are provided to group members and to their Area Coordinator. Newsletters and updates received from the Area Coordinator are also distributed to members. They may also wish to keep their Area Coordinator updated on any serious incidents in their area or rising concerns. They may also seek assistance from their Area Coordinator to plan an event such as a Community Safety Day or local meeting with Police or Fire and Emergency.

=== Neighbourhood Support Area ===
Suburbs, towns, cities or sections of a city are usually coordinated by one or more "Area Coordinators or Managers" whose role is to assist Neighbourhood Support Groups with important local news and information for their area, provide a conduit for Police to distribute crime alerts, and pass on other community safety tips.

In some cases, a single Street Contact may also act as an informal Area Coordinator, tying together a number of groups in the same suburb or street.

=== Neighbourhood Support Governance ===
Governance of the Neighbourhood Support movement in New Zealand, is provided through a national organisation Neighbourhood Support New Zealand which is overseen by a Board. Board members are elected voluntary representatives from a Neighbourhood Support New Zealand Member Organisation. A Police representatives nominated by New Zealand Police national headquarters attends Board meetings representing the Commissioner, and has a liaison and advisory role. A formal Memorandum of Understanding is established between Neighbourhood Support New Zealand and the New Zealand Police to make clear the nature of the relationship, and the obligations of each party.

Regionally, activities within each district are overseen by an elected and voluntary District Representative with boundaries aligned with those of the Police Districts.

== See also ==
- Neighbourhood Watch (UK) — UK organisation
- Neighborhood Watch — US organisation
