= Forced marriage in New Zealand =

Forced marriage is the marriage of one person to another person without the consent of one or both of the parties. It is to be distinguished from an arranged marriage, where the parties ultimately retain the right to refuse, whereas forced marriage employs tactics such as violent threats, emotional coercion, financial control, or immigration status blackmail to completely strip individuals of their autonomy. Forced marriage is widely recognised as a human rights abuse, with some commentators considering it a form of slavery.

== Prevalence of forced marriage in New Zealand ==
There is a lack of reliable statistics on rates of forced marriage in New Zealand. Some international reports considering the issue have relied on rates of registered marriages in New Zealand in which one party was under the age of 18. In 2013 there were 57 registered marriages in which one party was under the age of 18, consisting of 0.29% of registered marriages that year. However while many forced marriages involve a party under the age of 18, i.e. a minor participant, not all marriages involving a minor are forced marriages.

It is also widely recognised that many forced marriages may occur within ethnic or religious communities and derive their legitimacy from community recognition. As such marriages are viewed as legitimate by the community, they are often not registered and are difficult to track.

Community groups such as Shakti, a non-governmental organisation (NGO) that works to reduce domestic violence in migrant communities, have anecdotal evidence of forced marriage occurring in New Zealand. Higher rates of forced marriages have been found in Auckland in comparison to other urban centres, reflecting the higher concentration of African, Asian and Middle Eastern ethnic groups in Auckland (communities in which forced marriage is more likely to occur). However it is widely accepted that Shakti's anecdotal evidence does not truly reflect the extent of forced marriage in New Zealand, as many victims of forced marriage do not report their abuse and may be isolated within their own communities.

== Current legislative framework ==
=== Requirement of consent ===
Under section 17 of the Marriage Act 1955, a marriage cannot take place if a party is under 16 years of age. Sexual activity with a person under 16 years of age is also illegal. In addition to this, current New Zealand law requires that one party to a registered marriage sign a statutory declaration stating that there is free consent to the marriage. There is no requirement that both parties individually indicate that they have both consented to the marriage. The legislative requirement of explicit consent of only one party has been criticised by some scholars, who suggest that in forced marriages the consenting (and not forced) party will simply sign the declaration and thus suggest falsely that consent existed.

Parental consent is additionally required before the marriage of minors aged 16 or 17. However, in many cases forced marriages are supported and arranged by parents and thus this requirement of parental consent does not protect the free consent of minors.

=== Criminal provisions ===
There is currently no specific provision prohibiting forced marriage in New Zealand, but prosecution of those who force marriages may take place under several criminal offence provisions. Many scholars identify a likely avenue for prosecution as section 208 of the Crimes Act 1961 ('Abduction for purposes of marriage or sexual connection'). Additionally there may be liability under other provisions in the Crimes Act 1961 such as section 98 ('Dealing in Slaves'). It is however alleged that such provisions do not adequately address the issue of forced marriage. For example, a genuine mistaken belief in consent is a defence to section 208 liability and it may be hard to prove that such a mistaken belief did not exist.

=== Declaring a marriage invalid due to duress ===
Section 31 of the Family Proceedings Act 1980 also provides that a marriage may be declared invalid if there was duress upon entry into the marriage. This may allow victims of a forced marriage to have the marriage invalidated. The UN's Working Group on Women's Rights has promoted the availability of such legislation for victims of forced marriages who are minors in order to recognise the inappropriateness of forced marriage. Despite the existence of section 31, the courts have been unwilling to use this provision in practice because they have rarely made a finding of duress upon entry into marriage. In H v H, the claimant requested a voiding of the marriage ab initio due to duress under section 31. Consent had allegedly been removed because of family pressure to comply with the marriage. The Court referred to the applicant as having feelings of fear about 'displeasure, disgrace and ostracism'. However the Court refused to find that there had been duress leading to the marriage because the respondent was not underage, was raised in New Zealand, and was 'intelligent and relatively sophisticated'. The Court found that the applicant had simply desired to respect her culture, please her family and avoid embarrassment. Critically, the Court held that many marriages are not based on love and thus that feelings of wanting to please family were a normal part of a decision to marry. In Ali v Abbas, an application for voiding of a marriage based on duress was also not upheld. Evidence that the applicant was prompted to marry through fear of alienation and persecution was again rejected. Although the courts did not find duress in family pressure to consent to the marriage, it is acknowledged that family pressure may in fact lead to a forced marriage.

== International obligations ==
New Zealand is party to a number of international obligations to end forced marriage. It is a signatory to various conventions that protect free consent to marriage. Examples include the Universal Declaration of Human Rights (article 16(2)), the International Covenant on Civil and Political Rights (article 23(3)), the Convention on the Elimination of All Forms of Discrimination Against Women (article 16(1)(b)), and the Convention on Consent to Marriage, Minimum Age for Marriage and Registration of Marriages (article 1(1)). All these provisions are similar and emphasise the requirement of free consent to marriage for both men and women. Additionally, the Convention on the Rights of the Child requires signatories to prevent sexual abuse against children (article 19) and end practices that prejudice children (article 24(3)). Altogether, these obligations require New Zealand to take appropriate steps to prevent forced marriage from occurring.

=== Forced marriage as a form of slavery ===
The UN Working Group on Contemporary Forms of Slavery has identified forced marriage as a form of slavery. New Zealand is also a signatory to the Supplementary Convention on the Abolition of Slavery. This prohibits slavery and institutions and practices akin to slavery. Article 1(c) suggests that the forced giving of a woman in marriage, without her consent, is a practice akin to slavery and should be therefore outlawed. Other scholars have suggested that the prohibition on slavery may be a jus cogens norm of international law, and that therefore New Zealand must take immediate action to end the practice of forced marriage.

=== Soft law obligations ===
In addition to New Zealand's binding convention obligations, New Zealand has participated in the creation of various soft law documents that encourage actions to be taken to stop forced marriage. United Nations General Assembly Resolution 71/175 recognises the problem of forced marriage and emphasises the importance of free consent to marriage as a human right. Number 5 of the UN Sustainable Development Goals includes the removal of practices harmful to women, such as early and forced marriage.

== Treaty body reporting and international commentary ==
Treaty body reporting on New Zealand's progress in reducing incidences of forced marriage has not been favourable. A 2012 Committee on the Elimination of All Forms of Discrimination Against Women report noted that there was significant concern about lack of legislation to prevent forced marriage and uphold the rights of those who are affected by forced marriage. These concerns were echoed in a 2016 Committee on the Rights of the Child report, which recommended that New Zealand reform legislation to prohibit all marriages under the age of 18. The 2016 Committee on the Rights of the Child report additionally recommended that programs be developed to raise awareness of the issue of forced marriage.

In addition to direct treaty body reporting to New Zealand, UN organs have released a number of statements about the importance of reducing forced marriage rates. The Committee on the Elimination of All Forms of Discrimination Against Women released General Recommendation No. 35 in 2017, which recognised forced marriage as a form of gender-based violence and recommended the repeal of any provision that permitted this. This was an echo of a much earlier Recommendation in 1994 (No. 21), which again recommended that states take all measures to ensure that there is free consent to marriage and that children were not parties to marriages. A 2015 report by the Working Group on Women's Rights called for a number of efforts to be made to reduce incidences of forced marriage, and appropriately care for victims of forced marriages by invalidating such marriages and protecting custody of children, the right to remarry, and matrimonial assets. In addition the Commission on the Status of Women presented a number of agreed conclusions in 2013, one of which included the importance of ending forced marriage.

== Cultural rights issue ==
Although most international practice seems to speak against forced marriage, some states allege that forced marriage is primarily a cultural practice. Therefore communities would have a right to continue to practice forced marriage. During the creation of the Consent to Marriage, Minimum Age for Marriage and Registration of Marriages Convention, Pakistan's signatory argued that requiring consent to marriage was an inappropriate interference with cultural rights protected under Article 25 of the International Covenant on Civil and Political Rights. However this argument has not been favoured in other rights documents and it seems likely that it is appropriate to limit cultural rights in order to protect the fundamental right of consent to marriage.

== Domestic responses to international commentary ==
In 2014, New Zealand submitted a report as part of its reporting for the Convention on the Rights of the Child. The report highlights various strategies which have been taken to ensure that New Zealand meets its international obligations to end forced marriage, including multi-organisational efforts to increase understanding and raise awareness about the issue. In 2012, government agencies such as Child, Youth and Family (New Zealand), Work and Income, Family and Community Services, the Ministry of Education (New Zealand), New Zealand Police and Immigration New Zealand developed a collaborative response to the issue. In 2014, New Zealand responded to various recommendations made by the Committee on the Elimination of All Forms of Discrimination Against Women to the 7th periodic report of New Zealand. In response to the recommendation of raising the age of marriage to 18, New Zealand suggested that such an act would be discriminatory against those aged 16 or 17 who genuinely wish to marry. New Zealand also identified a number of positive steps that had already been taken to reduce forced marriage rates, including raising awareness about the issue, providing education about the issue, and being in open dialogue with the Indian High Commission and Shakti.

== Proposed legislative reform ==
=== 2009 parliamentary petition ===
In 2009 a parliamentary petition requesting greater legislative protection against forced marriage was introduced by Jane Prichard. This was addressed by a Justice and Electoral Committee Report published in 2011. The report acknowledged the difficulty in regulating unregistered, community-approved marriages, and encouraged community faith leaders to be registered as marriage celebrants in order to encourage registration of all marriages. However, the report did not promote legislation that directly prohibited forced marriage.

=== Family and Whanau Violence Legislation Bill ===
In 2017, numerous legislative amendments were introduced under the Family and Whanau Violence Legislation Bill. Section 97 of the bill includes a new proposed section 207A addition to the Crimes Act 1961. The new section 207A would create liability for those who coerce others into a marriage or a civil union. Notably, the provision also applies to marriages that have not been solemnised and so would therefore create liability for unregistered but community-recognised forced marriages. The bill is currently onto its second reading.

== Legislative reform ==
=== Minors (Court Consent to Relationships) Legislation Act ===
In 2012, a private member's bill, the Marriage (Court Consent to Marriage of Minors) Amendment Bill, was submitted by National Party MP Jackie Blue to address the problem of forced marriages of 16- and 17-year-olds. There are about 80 applications per year for marriages between 16- and 17-year-olds. After Blue left Parliament, the bill was picked up by fellow National MP Jo Hayes and was eventually drawn from the ballot on the 13 April 2017.

The Bill proposed that those aged 16 or 17 must apply to the Family Court for the consent of a Family Court Judge, replacing the previous requirement of parental consent to the marriage, and set out how the court is to consider the application. Submissions in favour of the Bill were made by groups such as the Human Rights Commission, and the New Zealand Law Society. The Children's Commissioner disagreed with this Bill, holding that it would unfairly impact on the rights of parents and would not truly address the issue of forced marriage.

At the Select Committee stage, the bill was broadened to cover civil unions and de facto relationships in addition to marriages and was retitled the Minors (Court Consent to Relationships) Legislation Bill. The select committee reported on the 18 May 2018. The bill passed its second reading on the 27 June and third reading on the 8 August, and receiving Royal Assent on the 13 August 2018 came into force the following day.

== See also ==
- Marriage in New Zealand
- International Day for the Elimination of Child, Early and Forced Marriage
