= Female genital mutilation in New Zealand =

In New Zealand, female genital mutilation (FGM) was made illegal in 1996 through an amendment to the Crimes Act 1961 when s204A was added. FGM is an issue in New Zealand because of the number of migrants from countries where FGM is commonly practised settling in New Zealand. FGM refers to procedures that, for non-medical reasons, intend to cause harm to female genital organs. The procedures may have negative health impacts by causing problems such as difficulty urinating, infections, severe bleeding and complications during childbirth. Procedures are normally carried out on girls from infancy to 15 years old. FGM is predominantly practised in countries throughout the Middle East, Asia and in Africa.

== Background ==
FGM is a cultural tradition, based upon the belief that having FGM performed upon young girls is in their best interests. Despite the first known documentation of FGM being recorded in Egypt in 25BC, it is thought that the practice of FGM has been occurring for some centuries prior to this. While FGM practices differ between communities, the theory among them remains relatively similar. Specifically, women are more attractive prospects for marriage when they have had the FGM procedure and in some regions it is considered a necessary part of a girl's social development. Where the most severe forms of FGM are practised (such as where infibulation is performed – this is the narrowing or sealing off of the vaginal opening) women are prevented from engaging in any promiscuity prior to marriage, thus making them more desirable. It is further believed that FGM saves women from temptation and safeguards the morality of women. In some communities where FGM is a tradition, misconceptions regarding the benefits of FGM have been passed through generations. Some beliefs include that FGM: promotes fertility, is an essential measure to ensure good health of the baby and the cleanliness of a woman and that the clitoris is a feature of masculinity and therefore FGM procedures create a smooth skin surface that is more desirable.

== Prevalence ==
There have been no cases of FGM taken under the New Zealand legislation, although it is known that migrants from countries such as Somalia have undergone FGM procedures before entering New Zealand. The communities that are predominantly affected by FGM are Ethiopian, Sudanese, Eritrean and Somali and many women in these communities have undergone FGM prior to arriving in New Zealand. The most affected group is the Somali community, where 98% of women have already undergone FGM prior to migrating to New Zealand. FGM is also practised in some Muslim communities in Malaysia, India and Indonesia and some women and girls from these communities, living in New Zealand, may have also undergone FGM.

== International obligations ==
New Zealand has a good history of ratifying and complying with international law instruments. A number of these instruments refer to or impact upon New Zealand and the domestic laws surrounding FGM. The first over arching covenant is the Universal Declaration of Human Rights, which New Zealand supported in 1948. Specifically, Article 25 provides that everyone has the right to adequate health and medical care, clothing, shelter and necessary social services, as well as the right to security in the event of sickness, unemployment or other circumstances beyond his or her control.

New Zealand ratified the Convention on the Elimination of All Forms of Discrimination Against Women in 1985. The Ministry of Women's Affairs is responsible for administering this Convention. Article 2(f) relates to FGM because it requires states to take all measures to abolish or modify existing laws, customs and practices which amount to discrimination against women. Further relevant obligations contained within this convention include Article 5, which states that all appropriate measures shall be taken to modify the patterns, both social and cultural, of women and men to achieve the elimination of prejudices based on the superiority and inferiority of either sex. Article 12 also relates to FGM because it requires all relevant measures be taken by the state to extinguish discrimination against females in health care and to ensure men and women have equal access to health care services. In response to these obligations, New Zealand has sections relating to discrimination within its Human Rights Act 1993. For example, section 21 prohibits discrimination on a number of grounds, including sex.

The Convention on the Rights of the Child, which New Zealand ratified in 1993, contains a number of obligations which require all states who are party to the convention to act against FGM. These are prescribed in Articles 2, 19, 24 and 37. Article 2 requires states to ensure all rights of children within the convention are protected under domestic jurisdiction without any form of discrimination, including: sex, religion, ethnic or social origin or race. Article 19.2 specifically requires the state to provide the necessary support and measures for children who have been maltreated through forms of mental or physical violence, neglect or injury while in the care of a parent or legal guardian. A further requirement is that there are forms of prevention, investigations and treatment for the children and, where appropriate, for judicial involvement. Article 24 ensures that states recognise children's rights to access health care and to make sure no child is deprived of this right. Further, Article 24.3 states that all measures, where appropriate, should be taken to abolish traditional practices that are to the detriment of children's health. Article 37 states that no child shall be subjected to torture or other degrading or inhuman punishment or treatment. New Zealand complies with these obligations under the covenant on the rights of the child by having domestic law which makes any practice or form of FGM illegal.

Also relevant is the International Covenant on Civil and Political Rights which New Zealand ratified in 1978. Article 7 relates to FGM because it states that no one will be subjected to degrading or inhuman punishment or torture, or to scientific or medical experimentation (without free consent). New Zealand issued its report for the fourth periodic review of states party to the International Covenant on Civil and Political Rights at the sixty-sixth session of the Human Rights Committee in 1999. New Zealand reported that; in complying with the international obligations in article 7 of the covenant, Parliament amended the criminal legislation to specifically make FGM illegal.

== Domestic measures ==
In New Zealand, FGM is regarded as a violation of human rights. The practice of FGM was therefore made illegal in 1996 under an amendment to the Crimes Act 1961. Under section 204A of the Crimes Act 1961, it is illegal to perform any form of female genital mutilation. FGM is defined within the Crimes Act as the mutilation, infibulation or excision of part of or the whole of the labia minora, labia majora or the clitoris of any person. FGM is illegal even where the girl or woman has consented to the procedure. It is also illegal to cause a child to be sent outside of New Zealand or to make arrangements for a child to be sent outside of New Zealand where the intent is that FGM be carried out that would be illegal under s204A if performed in New Zealand. The Act also states that a person is liable for up to seven years imprisonment where that person aids, procures or incites FGM to be performed outside of New Zealand where that person is a New Zealand resident or citizen and doing so would be illegal if carried out in New Zealand. The punishment is up to seven years imprisonment for FGM whether the person actually performs the procedure or assisted. There is no defence of consent, even where the defendant claims to have thought the victim consented, and no ‘victim’ will be charged as a party to the offence.

In New Zealand, there are no direct public health policies that relate to FGM. However, the New Zealand Health Strategy 2000 referred to programmes relating to FGM, including the need to address refugee communities who practice FGM. In 1997, in response to the increasing number of women and girls settling in New Zealand from countries which practice FGM, a community based programme was established to provide improved health care services for women affected by FGM. This programme is funded by the Ministry of Health and aims to provide education on FGM and support for those affected by FGM.

As the result of a study carried out in 2008, the New Zealand FGM Programme developed guidelines for health care professionals. Today, Child Youth and Family regional practitioners and forensic interviewers for each region undergo training carried out by the FGM Education Programme. This means that where a suspected case of FGM arises there are people in place who understand what to do. There is also an investigation plan in place which ensures that the Police Child Abuse Team is notified. The process includes the following steps; a health professional who knows the family is contacted, as well as a community worker (depending on the ethnicity of the child and their family), and engagement of an interpreter is considered. Engagement with the family is conducted in a sensitive manner to allow the family to retain their dignity. Further checks are made as to whether the family are aware of New Zealand's laws on FGM. A limitation of these guidelines is that they are not compulsory for all health services in New Zealand, meaning that not all health professionals are sufficiently trained in how to care for women who have had FGM procedures. This becomes an issue during labour and postnatal periods.
