= Child abuse in New Zealand =

According to UNICEF, New Zealand has one of the worst rates of child abuse in the developed world. The level of abuse is the fifth-highest in the OECD, with an average of one child being killed every five weeks and 150,000 cases reported every year by Oranga Tamariki, the national children's protection agency. Child abuse in New Zealand is defined under section 2 of the Oranga Tamariki Act 1989 as the harming of a child by physically, emotionally or sexually ill treating them through abuse or neglect. Prevention of such abuse in New Zealand is seen as a high priority by the New Zealand government as well as relevant non governmental organisations due to the prevalence of child abuse cases occurring in New Zealand, particularly when compared with other developed countries. This response is consistent with New Zealand's obligations under the United Nations Convention on the Rights of the Child at article 34 – 35 which deals specifically with Child Abuse. This convention places obligations on New Zealand as a state to protect the rights of the child and was ratified by New Zealand in 1993.

== Statistics ==
In 2007 the rate of deaths of children and young persons under the age of 19 in New Zealand caused by accidents, murder, suicide or violence were extremely high compared with other OECD countries, with New Zealand having the highest rate of such deaths along with the United States. The reports by the Child Poverty Action Group of New Zealand confirms this need to be aware of the increasing statistic of child abuse findings. A trend can be noticed of increasing concern for child abuse, as in the 2013 financial year compared with 2012 there was an increase in child abuse reports as well as substantive findings. The report also details the types of abuse suffered and where this abuse is most prevalent, stating that sexual abuse as a form of child abuse within New Zealand made up the smallest percentage of abused children, and defined the main form of abuse as emotional abuse, also that across the many site offices where child abuse was recorded, Papakura, a suburb of Auckland, had the highest rate of child abuse cases, with Wellington having the fewest reported cases.

== Contributing factors ==
There has been extensive research undertaken in New Zealand regarding the reasons behind child abuse and understanding the factors behind it is crucial to addressing this problem. In the study by the Ministry of Development in December 2010 the study commented that the main causes of child abuse within New Zealand were due to substance abuse, as well as poor parenting practices through generations. Drug and alcohol abuse put a child in an environment in which the significance of child abuse is greatly increased compared with households that substance abuse is not a part of the environment. However, there is also a suggestion that child neglect in the form of abuse is the result of poverty and family stresses. But it is not just that issue of poverty that causes the child abuse but the effect of the poverty on the parents mental well being leading to multiple stresses which researchers have identified as being predictive of child abuse.

== Recent cases ==
=== Kahui twins ===
This case is still unsolved with Chris Kahui (the father of the twins) found not guilty for the murders of Christopher and Cru Kahui. Both twins died on 18 June 2006 from blunt force trauma causing brain injury. It was suggested that this injury was caused by either direct blows to the head or being thrown against a firm surface or severe shaking. The death of the Kahui twins stunned the New Zealand community and was one of the contributing factors towards the New Zealand response campaign 'Never Shake A Baby'.

=== Nia Glassie ===
In 2007 Nia Glassie died at the age of three, due to severe brain damage. Wiremu Curtis (her mother's partner) and his brother Michael Curtis were charged with her murder, Lisa Kuka (her mother) was charged with failing to provide the necessities of life and failing to protect a child from violence. The court report stated that Nia had been subjected to violence for up to two months preceding while in the care of Wiremu Curtis. This abuse was said to be part of Nia's day-to-day life and included two major incidents where Nia was hung from a clothesline which was spun until she fell and putting her in a clothes dryer and turning this on. On 20 July 2007 Nia received kicks to her head which ultimately resulted in her death. She was eventually taken to hospital two days later after residing in a partial coma for this period where she died 13 days later. The trauma inflicted upon Nia was widely publicized within the New Zealand community and her story became the 'poster story' to encourage New Zealanders to report child abuse happening in their community.

=== Tahani Mahomed ===
Tahani Mahomed died 1 January 2008 after being admitted to hospital 28 December 2007 due to failure to feed. Upon admission to the hospital her condition was upgraded to critical due to head injuries consistent with being hit with great force. Mr Mahomed was charged on one count of murder of Tahani two counts of injuring with intent to cause grievous bodily harm and failing to provide the necessities of life and Ms Mahomed with failure to provide necessities of life. It was found during admission that Tahani as well as suffering from recent head trauma was also recovering from a previous broken leg and head injury that were in the process of healing.

=== Duwayne Pailegutu ===
Duwayne died on 2 July 2008, following 75 external injuries from assault by his stepfather Mr Joachim that left him paralyzed on one side and difficulty breathing. Mr Joachim was sentenced to 18 years non parole for his death. Duwayne's injuries were the result of a Mr Joachim's assault on 24 June 2008 and his subsequent neglect to seek treatment for the boy after the attack.

== New Zealand response ==
=== Response to the Committee on the Rights of the Child 2010 ===
New Zealand's obligations to human rights is widely known however the committee on the rights of the child in its last evaluation was concerned with New Zealand's response to child abuse in part 1 (3) of their report in 2010. They requested information on prevention measures, actions and policies taken by New Zealand as well as services and programs to help those who had suffered from abuse. The New Zealand response was detailed in their report back to the committee at Part 1 section 15 and included the introduction of many campaigns and initiatives including the investment of $333 million which would be invested in community based initiatives targeted at improving the outcome for families.

=== Never Shake a Baby campaign 2009 ===
Launched by the Plunket Society (a non profit organisation working in the development of families) and Barnados New Zealand (provider of child and family services within New Zealand) it was set up as an education tool to help young parents know what the consequences of shaking a baby at the early stages of development were. It was introduced by Paula Bennett the Minister of Social Development and Employment at the time. The concern was that the statistics showed that every five days on average a child was hospitalized due to non accidental injuries. The campaign also involved a first-response community-based child abuse prevention trial that followed up on those families in which domestic violence had been reported.

=== White paper Submission on Vulnerable Children ===
This was a government submission on their commitment to address the factors that place children at risk of abuse, the government response to protect children and how children who were at risk were identified and the response to them. The framework for this is found in the Children's Action Plan where it was stated that it would evolve as the fundamental changes are achieved. The submission identifies that the family and caregivers are the most important player in the care and protection of vulnerable children. It implements new tools used to identify at risk children the development of the communication between government agencies to work together to improve this situation and new measures to manage adults with a high risk factor of abusing children.

=== Section 59 of the Crimes Act 1961 ===
The Crimes (Substituted Section 59) Amendment Act 2007 amended s59 of the Crimes Act 1961 which hitherto provided a defence for parents who used force to discipline their children The amendment bill was colloquially referred to as an 'anti-smacking bill' and was introduced as a member's bill by Green Party MP Sue Bradford in 2005. It was endorsed by many organisations such as Barnados New Zealand and the Plunket Society but met with considerable public and political opposition. Arguments included whether the changed wording to section 59 would have an impact on the incidence of child abuse.

=== It's not okay campaign ===
The "it's not okay" campaign began with television advertisements in 2007 and 2008. Surveys were done to measure the effectiveness of this campaign and found that at least 95% of the people surveyed reported recalling something about the advert and over 68% stated that the advertisements helped them to understand the behaviours that were not tolerable. This campaign has now continued advancing to the ‘its okay to ask for help’ campaign. This campaign has so far included TV advertisements, community-led activities, a family violence information line a website with information, speakers who share their personal stories and a research and evaluation programme.
