= Zucht und Ordnung =

Zucht und Ordnung

Zucht und Ordnung is a German term, literally meaning 'discipline and order', in some ways paralleled by the English phrase law and order. Since the time of the Reformation the phrase has referred to the hierarchical relationships that exist (or supposedly ought to exist) in social institutions such as families, monasteries, schools, communities, government, and the military. The phrase was initially closely associated with Christianity, but in the eighteenth century its usage extended to secular contexts. In modern usage, the term is often used to label excessively strict authority and discipline, and is particularly associated with the ideologies of National Socialism.

== Etymology ==
The basic meaning of the word Zucht (Old High German/Middle High German zuht) was historically associated with human breeding and nurturing of livestock. Additional meanings that the word acquired later, in modern German, include 'training' and 'education', particularly of children (including in decency and modesty). Because the training/education of children was often accompanied by disciplining and punishment, Zucht also appears in compound words like Zuchthaus ('penitentiary'), Zuchtmittel ('disciplinary measures'), Züchtigung ('punishment'), Zuchtlosigkeit ('licentiousness', literally ‘Zuchtlessness') and Unzucht ('immorality', literally 'unZucht').

== Usage history ==
The term Zucht und Ordnung is attested in German from at least the fifteenth century, when it might be translated as 'Christian discipline and order'. The idea that Christians should submit to discipline and order is particularly associated with the Apostle Paul's First Epistle to the Corinthians, 14:40, translated by Martin Luther as 'lasset alles ehrbar und ordentlich zugehen' ('but let all things be done properly and in an orderly manner'). This verse had a particular strong influence on Thomas a Kempis and John Calvin.

In the time of Frederick the Great (1712–86), the term came to be used in secular contexts, applied primarily the secular institutions of the Prussian state, initially in particular the Prussian Army, but also to the educational institutions, following the Prussian reforms. During this period, the term Zucht und Ordnung generally had positive connotations. For example, Goethe used it in his novel Wilhelm Meisters Wanderjahre. A more critical usage began, using the term ironically, in the late nineteenth century, in parallel to the traditional, positive usage.

The term was picked up again in the period of National Socialism, for example by the Nazi Georg Usadel in his 1935 volume Zucht und Ordnung, a guide to Nazi ethics. In this context, the word Zucht is partly used in its etymological meaning 'human-influenced development of species' (in this case the master race, giving a sense along the lines of 'breeding and order'), and partly in the sense of 'education' as conceived in National Socialist ideology, specifically promoting loyalty (Gefolgschaft).

Following the end of World War II, the term has been used almost exclusively as a quotation. With the anti-authoritarian movements of the 1960s and 1970s, the term Zucht und Ordnung increasingly became a battle cry of critics of traditional teaching and educational methods, associating the terms 'authority' and 'discipline' with the subservient mentality associated, inter alia, with Nazism. The term also became associated with BDSM. For example, the quarterly magazine Zucht und Ordnung (Z & O), targeted at gay practitioners of erotic spanking, ran from the mid-1980s to the end of 1995 in Germany.
