= Penal populism =

Populism on criminal justice

Penal populism is populism related to criminal justice. It tends to manifest in the run up to elections when political parties put forward hard-line policies which they believe the public wants, rather than evidence-based policies based on their effectiveness at dealing with crime and associated social problems. Penal populism can be a media-driven political process whereby politicians compete with each other to impose tougher prison sentences on offenders based on a perception that crime is out of control.

== Origins ==
The phrase was coined in 1993 by Anthony Bottoms, when he labeled it one of the four main influences on contemporary criminal justice. It is a process that ignores or minimizes the views of criminologists, justice professionals and penal experts, claiming instead to represent the views of "the people" about the need for tougher punishment for criminal offenses.

It has been theorized that the rise of penal populism has brought about an increase in the repressiveness of various nations' criminal laws, including that of the United Kingdom, Canada under Prime Minister Stephen Harper, and the United States during the war on drugs. The resurgence of penal populism in the early 21st-century led to streams of populism flowing deeper from penal fields into mainstream society. This shift from penal to political populism was precipitated by two interconnected factors: the impact of the Great Recession and the mass movement of peoples across the globe.

Scholars argue that the concept of penal populism may imply an implicit form of penal elitism, that is, the "belief that penal policymaking should not be subjected to public debate and that matters pertaining to crime control and punishment should be left to experts or specialists." Similarly, others question whether public influence on punishment is best understood simply as a source of distortion or excess. They argue that accounts of penal populism may overstate the irrationality of lay judgment while underestimating the ways institutional design and political incentives shape punitive outcomes. Proposals to insulate penal policy from democratic participation can themselves generate concerns about political accountability and legitimacy.

== See also ==
- Carceral feminism
- Crime statistics
- Dark figure of crime
- Dutertism
- Law and order (politics)
- Under-reporting
