= Te Ao Mārama =

Māori concept

Te Ao Mārama is a concept of the world in Māori culture. Te Ao Mārama, also known as Te Ao Tūroa ("The Long-Standing World"), refers to the physical plane of existence that is inhabited by people, and is associated with knowledge and understanding. The phrase is variously translated as "The World of Light", "the World of Understanding" and "the Natural World".

== Concept ==
Te Ao Mārama is a part of the cosmological whakapapa that features in the creation story of Rangi and Papa in Maori mythology. It is the third and current phase of the creation of the world, after Te Kore and Te Pō. Te Kore was the primordial era at the beginning of time (variously a void or a world of chaos depending on tradition and interpretation), while Te Pō, the world of darkness and potential, was the world in which atua (gods and spirits) were born into. Te Ao Mārama is said to have been created when the Gods separated Ranginui (the God of the Sky) and Papatūānuku (the Goddess of the Earth).

Traditionally in Māori worldviews, most ordinary matter in life was seen as originating from Te Ao Mārama, while metaphysical concepts such as mana and tapu were seen as originating from Te Pō.

Te Ahukaramū Charles Royal developed Te Ao Mārama paradigm of Māori epistemology in 1998. Royal used the term Te Ao Mārama to describe the worldview and cultural context from which all Mātauranga Māori (traditional knowledge) was able to develop from.

== Te Ao Mārama in the District Court ==
In November, 2020, the chief district court judge, Heemi Taumaunu, announced that Te Ao Mārama would be applied to every district court in New Zealand, with the goal of bringing about transformative justice. He said:

"Te Ao Mārama will incorporate best practices developed in the District Court’s solution-focused specialist courts into its mainstream criminal jurisdiction. This is to realise the shared vision for the court by improving access to justice as well as enhancing procedural and substantive fairness, for all people who are affected by the business of the court, including defendants, victims, witnesses, whānau and parties to proceedings."

In 2022, William Sio the Minister for Courts, arranged for $47.5 million to be allocated over four years to support the establishment of Te Ao Mārama in the District Courts.

=== Guidelines for Te Ao Mārama ===
The District Court has published a Best Practice Framework for Te Ao Mārama. It includes eight strategies. These are:

- Enhanced connections with local communities
- Improving the quality of information judicial officers receive to inform their decisions
- Improved processes for victims and complainants
- Encouraging people to feel heard in the courtroom
- Establishing alternative courtroom layouts
- Using plain language
- Toning down formalities
- Adopting solution-focused judging approaches

=== Implementation ===
As at March 2024, Te Ao Mārama is in the process of being incorporated in the District Courts in Hamilton, Gisborne and Kaitaia.

==== Shortage of support services ====
Chief judge, Heemi Taumaunu notes that there is a lack of supportive services in many communities such that currently they "have no presence in the courtroom". The Best Practice Framework makes particular reference to making alcohol and other drug counselling and treatment, non-violence and safety programmes, and comprehensive wrap-around therapeutic support services available to the courts. This will be difficult to achieve as currently, only about 5% of the 60,000 people appearing in court each year have an alcohol and drug assessment - even though more than half of all crime in New Zealand is committed under the influence of drugs or alcohol, and 91% of prison inmates have been diagnosed with a substance abuse or mental health disorder at some point in their lifetime.

==== Removal of cultural reports ====
The coalition government's decision in March 2024 to remove legal aid funding for cultural reports will also make it difficult for judges to be well informed about the defendants appearing before them.

==== Removal of further funding ====
In 2025, the coalition government paused the rollout of funding to other courts claiming the need for an evaluation of the programme's effectiveness.
