= Murder of Nia Glassie =

2007 New Zealand murder

Nia Marie Glassie was a three-year-old girl who was violently abused and eventually killed by her mother's boyfriend and his brother in Rotorua, New Zealand. Her death in 2007 sparked a high-profile criminal investigation and subsequent murder trial, and caused major outrage throughout the country.

By the end of 2008, Nia's mother Lisa Michelle Kuka was found guilty on two counts of manslaughter, and Kuka's partner, Wiremu Curtis, and his brother, Michael, were convicted of murder. The Curtis brothers were given life sentences.

== Abuse and death ==
Nia was subject to extensive physical abuse for weeks, possibly even months, before being admitted to hospital and dying of brain injuries on 3 August 2007. The court concluded that in addition to having had chunks of wood dropped on her and wrestling moves copied from a computer game practised on her, she had been kicked, beaten, slapped, jumped on, held over a burning fire, spat on, placed into a clothes dryer spinning at top heat for up to 30 minutes, folded into a sofa and sat on, shoved into piles of rubbish, dragged through a sandpit half-naked, flung against a wall, dropped from a height onto the floor, and whirled rapidly on an outdoor rotary clothes line until thrown off.

At the time, her mother, 34-year-old Lisa Michelle Kuka, told the hospital her injuries were the result of her falling off her partner's (then 17-year-old Wiremu Te Aroha Te Whanau Curtis) shoulders. It later emerged that her central North Island family, which was celebrating a 21st birthday, waited 36 hours after the toddler lapsed into a coma on the floor before taking her to the hospital. Lisa was seen in clubs during her daughter's hospitalization. During the trial, a doctor told the court that if the little girl had been taken to hospital as soon as she was unconscious, she would have likely survived.

== Trial ==
After a four-week-long trial ending in November 2008, Nia's mother, Lisa Michelle Kuka, 35, was found guilty of two counts of manslaughter: one for failing to obtain medical treatment for the toddler before her death in August 2007, and one for failing to protect her. Kuka's partner Wiremu Curtis, 19, and his brother Michael, 22, were found guilty of murder and sentenced to life in prison. Nia's cousin Michael Pearson, 20, and Michael Curtis's partner Oriwa Kemp, 18, were found not guilty on manslaughter charges but were convicted of child cruelty. The presiding judge, Judith Potter, openly wept as she delivered the sentences and after thanking equally affected shaken jurors for coping with the case went so far as to offer them counselling.

William Curtis, the father of the Curtis brothers, also faced charges for the alleged abuse of Nia concerning an earlier alleged incident but as of November 2008 no trial date had been set for him.

== Aftermath ==
Nia's abuse became the subject of various campaigns against violence and cruelty to children in New Zealand. Prime Minister Helen Clark said she could not believe that a child could suffer like that without anybody knowing about it and encouraged New Zealanders to report child abuse. In fact many in the community blame the culture of "not wanting to nark" or inform the police of domestic violence matters as one of the prime contributors to Nia's death. For example, one of the prosecution witnesses Rawhiti Simiona, a neighbour to the house where Nia suffered, told New Zealand television he regretted not calling the police when he saw the toddler being swung on the clothes line.

A distinctive picture of Nia wearing white and yellow in a blue Disney themed car seat has been used to identify child-abuse related stories in the New Zealand media, with Nia literally becoming a poster-child.

In late 2011, Nia's father's sister Matakapua Glassie was shot and seriously wounded outside Tokoroa police station by her ex-partner, who was later found dead. In 2012, Michael Pearson was sentenced to 2 months jail for a number of charges, including breaching bail. In 2014, Nia's mother Lisa was paroled, but recalled on 22 August 2016. She was expected to be re-paroled in 2017. Oriwa Kemp went on to have multiple children taken into care.
