= Criminal Cases Review Commission (New Zealand) =

Legal entity

- Te Kāhui Tātari Ture (Māori)

Agency overview
- Formed: 1 July 2020
- Type: Statutory Crown Entity
- Jurisdiction: New Zealand
- Headquarters: Hamilton, New Zealand
- Employees: 23
- Annual budget: $5,391,661 NZD; Total budget for 2023/2024
- Minister responsible: Hon. Paul Goldsmith, Minister of Justice
- Agency executive: Denis Clifford, Chief Commissioner
- Parent department: Ministry of Justice
- Website: www.ccrc.nz

The New Zealand Criminal Cases Review Commission (Māori: Te Kāhui Tātari Ture) is a Statutory Crown Entity that was established by the Criminal Cases Review Commission Act 2019 to investigate potential miscarriages of justice. If the Commission considers a miscarriage may have occurred, it can refer the case back to the Court of Appeal to be reconsidered.

The Commission was established on 1 July 2020. It replaces the referral function of the Royal Prerogative of Mercy whereby the Governor-General, following a review of the case by the Ministry of Justice, could recommend the Appeal Court reconsider the case. The Governor-General still has the authority to grant a free or conditional pardon, suspend the execution of any sentence, or remit a sentence, whereas the CCRC does not have such powers.

The need for an independent commission arose because of a growing number of high profile miscarriages of justice in New Zealand and concerns that the Ministry of Justice is not independent of the Crown or the judiciary, with the result that the granting of pardons by the Governor-General has been extremely rare in New Zealand. The last person to receive such a pardon was Arthur Allan Thomas in 1979. Since 1995, only 15 cases out of 166 applications for the RPM were sent back to the courts for further consideration.

The Commission is based in Hamilton in order to increase its independence from the Crown and government agencies in Wellington and Auckland. It is governed by a board of appointed commissioners. It employs specialist staff with the mandate to investigate possible miscarriages of justice, but does not decide innocence or guilt.

The National Party opposed its establishment, and in 2024, appointed a retired judge as head of the Commission, potentially undermining its independence. In November 2025, it was reported in the media that a review the Commission had been conducting into the impact of eyewitness testimony, which has contributed to a number of miscarriages of justice, has been delayed and substantially scaled back.

== Background ==
In 2006, Sir Thomas Thorp, a retired High Court judge said there might be 20 or more innocent people in prison in New Zealand. However, data released by Open Justice in 2023 found there have been nearly 900 wrongful convictions in the last ten years.

But there is also no documented information describing the nature of the inquiry process used by the Ministry of Justice when considering applications for a pardon. Historically, the applicant had to provide the necessary information and make their case for the exercise of the prerogative of mercy. The Ministry would review the information, but had no power to actually investigate what happened. This meant that well-resourced applicants with access to professional assistance had a distinct advantage over those without such resources.

Another concern is that historically, the Royal prerogative of mercy process received very few applications from Māori and Pasifika people, who are over-represented in the justice system. Between 11-16% of applications have been from Māori and Pasifika peoples, even though they make up more than 60% of the prison population. The Commission cites this statistic as part of the rationale for its establishment.

=== High profile miscarriages of justice ===
Arthur Allan Thomas was one of the first miscarriage of justice cases that received significant media attention. Convicted of murder, he received a pardon in 1980 after a Royal Commission inquiry into his case found the police had planted evidence in order to secure his conviction. David Bain spent 13 years in prison before his conviction was overturned by the Privy Council in London after a lengthy legal battle conducted on his behalf by former All Black Joe Karam.

In 1993, Peter Ellis was convicted on 16 counts of sexual offending involving children in his care at the Christchurch Civic Creche around the time of the day-care sex-abuse hysteria. In October 2022, the Supreme Court found there were problems with the evidence from the main prosecution witness, a psychiatrist, and that the jury had not been fairly informed of the risk of contamination of the children's evidence. Ellis's convictions were quashed after he had died.

Teina Pora spent 20 years in prison for a murder he did not commit, before his conviction was overturned. Another case is that of Alan Hall. It took 36 years, 19 of them spent in prison, before the Supreme Court of New Zealand acknowledged a substantial miscarriage of justice had occurred and overturned his conviction on 8 June 2022. Both Teina Pora and Alan Hall were subsequently diagnosed with autism, which made them vulnerable to manipulation when interrogated by police.

A more recent case where a miscarriage of justice was declared involved the convictions of Gail Maney and Stephen Stone, who were convicted of murdering Dean Fuller-Sandys. Stone was also convicted of killing Leah Stephens five days later. With no forensic evidence, the convictions were based on the testimony of four people, two of whom subsequently recanted, saying they were pressured by police to claim they were witnesses.

Another possible case includes Shaun Allen, who was convicted of growing cannabis on his farm and has been battling for 29 years to clear his name. His farm was confiscated and he spent 18 months in prison. Others likely to make an application include Mark Lundy and Scott Watson, both of whom have protested their innocence despite spending years in prison.

The Commission has said that the need for its work also stems from concerns about the lack of independence of the previous review process, the length of time it takes for investigations to be conducted, the reluctance of appeal courts to overturn convictions and the poor quality of investigations into miscarriages of justice.

=== Judicial reluctance to overturn convictions ===
The years of legal wrangling that David Bain endured before his conviction was finally overturned after 13 years became the subject of intense media interest in New Zealand. With Joe Karam's help, he made his first application to the New Zealand Court of Appeal in 1995. In June 1998, he petitioned the Governor-General for a pardon. His case was reviewed by the Ministry of Justice, and sent back to the Court of Appeal which again turned him down. In March 2007, Bain took his case to the Privy Council in London. The Privy Council quashed his convictions and ordered a retrial. It was not until 2009 that a new trial was held and he was finally found not guilty. Judith Collins, who was Minister of Justice at the time, refused to accept that he was innocent and denied him Government compensation, even though he had spent 13 years in prison.

Until 2022, the New Zealand justice system had also repeatedly turned a blind eye to Alan Hall's imprisonment, despite extensive documentation provided to the Ministry of Justice describing what had gone wrong with his case. Nick Chisnall, the lawyer who helped persuade the Supreme Court to overturn Alan Hall's conviction, commented afterwards: "the fact it’s taken 30 years to get to this point, is an indictment on our criminal justice system. It demonstrates how hard a palpably innocent person has to work to overturn a conviction.”

The reluctance of the justice system to overturn wrongful convictions led former justice Minister Andrew Little to declare that judges should not be appointed as commissioners - because judges might have adjudicated a previous case which now involved an applicant seeking to have his/her conviction overturned.

=== Beginnings ===
Former Justice Minister Andrew Little was instrumental in establishing the CCRC. In February 2020, he announced it would be established in Hamilton, adding that: "we've have some significant cases where there have been miscarriages of justice and it has taken a long time for that to be detected, for things to be put right, and ultimately for justice to be done".

Hamilton was chosen to try and remove Commissioners from day-to-day contacts with the "big bureaucratic and judicial centres" of Auckland and Wellington. Hamilton barrister Roger Laybourn agreed that making the Commission separate from the justice department and the court system is important.

== Powers ==
The main function of the Commission is to receive applications, investigate and refer a conviction or sentence in a criminal case back to the appeal courts when the Commission considers a miscarriage of justice might have occurred.

The Commission has the power to develop its own procedures to ensure it can effectively carry out its duties and functions. In addition to its power of referral, the Commission has a duty to educate people and promote its work; the power to make initial inquires on its own motion; a power to conduct thematic inquiries; and the power to obtain information or exhibits from any public and private bodies it deems relevant to an inquiry.

=== Inquiry into eyewitness identification ===
In 2024, the Commission announced it had launched an inquiry into the reliability of eyewitness identification evidence, and examine how flaws in the process have contributed to miscarriages of justice. Mike White points out that mistakes in eyewitness testimony played a part in high-profile miscarriages such as Teina Pora, Alan Hall, and David Dougherty and that controversies about eyewitness evidence featured in the appeals of Scott Watson and David Tamihere.

Due to these concerns, the Commission said it would release a public consultation paper in mid-2024, leading to a final report by June 2025. Neither of these have occurred. The Commission now says it hoped to deliver a report by June 2026. A spokesperson said the Commission had decided to 'refine the scope' of the inquiry, which now would only look at 'possible improvements' to the Evidence Act relating to formal procedures for obtaining visual identification evidence by the police.

== Personnel ==
In order to maintain its independence, no judges were appointed to the Commission. Colin Carruthers KC was appointed as the first Chief Commissioner, and Parekawhia McLean was the Chief Executive. Paula Rose, a former Police national manager of road policing, was the deputy chief commissioner. The other commissioners were Nigel Hampton CNZM OBE KC, Dr Virginia Hope MNZM, Professor Tracey McIntosh MNZM, Kingi Snelgar, and Associate Professor Tamasailau Suaalii-Sauni.

Tim McKinnell was the CCRC’s investigation and review manager until June 2023. He is also a former police officer who became an independent investigator, and played a key role in overturning the murder convictions of Teina Pora and Alan Hall and Gail Maney.

=== Changes in personnel 2024 ===
In October 2024, Paul Goldsmith, the Justice Minister, told Nigel Hampton KC, CCRC head Colin Carruthers KC, and fellow commissioner Virginia Hope that when their terms expire in December, the National Party would not renew them, even though all three wished to continue. They will be replaced by Suzanne Robertson KC, who has no experience in criminal law, and Emma Finlayson-Davis, who was a Crown prosecutor for 10 years. The chief commissioner’s job will be given to a retired judge, Denis Clifford.

When this announcement was made, Nigel Hampton resigned immediately, saying these appointments effectively stripped the Commission of anyone with experience in its core work of investigating individual miscarriages; he and Carruthers had extensive involvement in such investigations before the CCRC was even formed. Hampton also said that appointing a former judge as head of the CCRC created the perception that it was now just another branch of the justice system, which was responsible for the wrongful convictions in the first place.

Andrew Little was Minister of Justice when the CCRC was established. Following the appointment of Denis Clifford, he said: “If people who consider themselves to be victims of a miscarriage of justice find themselves making an application to a body that has another judge on it, even a senior judge, then they will be forgiven for thinking they’re just going through another part of the justice system that, generally speaking, they will have already lost confidence in." He added Commissioners need to have “an established track record of challenging the establishment, the prosecution system, the police, and the courts for the decisions they make".

=== Possible conflicts of interest ===
When the need for a CCRC was proposed, the Ministry of Justice argued against the need for such a body, as it had a long history of assessing such claims, and apparently wanted to maintain the status quo. However, Andrew Little was adamant the CCRC has to be independent from the Ministry of Justice because its function is to review the mistakes of that system. In 2024, the Ministry made recommendations to Paul Goldsmith regarding who should be appointed as the new commissioners.

In regard to the appointment of retired judge Denis Clifford to head the Commission, Little said: “I was always very clear the Government should be very careful about appointing a judge to a body which is critiquing the work of our courts, particularly our senior courts, when it comes to miscarriages of justice.”

The Ministry also recommended Finlayson-Davis even though her husband is a partner at Meredith Connell responsible for prosecuting criminal cases in Auckland ‒ including numerous people who have applied to the CCRC saying they were wrongfully convicted.

=== Resignation of Denis Clifford ===
In August 2026, after only 20 months as head of the Commission, Denis Clifford suddenly resigned. During his tenure, only two cases were referred back to the courts for review and the CCRC has continued to attract considerable criticism. Since its inception six years ago, the CCRC has only referred a total of six cases back to the courts out of 677 applications. This represents a referral rate of 0.8%, compared with 3% in England, 5% in Scotland, and 16% in Norway. Nigel Hampton KC expressed concern that several cases which were in the final stages of consideration when he resigned in October 2024 still hadn’t been completed. He suggested this was because Justice Minister, Paul Goldsmith appointed Denis Clifford and two lawyers as Commissioners - none of whom had previous criminal experience.

== Application process ==
Applicants must have been convicted of a criminal offence in New Zealand and still be alive (which rules out Peter Ellis (childcare worker) making an application). Applications can also be made by family members, lawyers or support people on behalf of the applicant. Applicants need to have exhausted all their rights of appeal at court before making an application. The CCRC will request information from the lawyers or advocates who supported the convicted person at every stage of the process, including details of any confidential discussions the Applicant had with their lawyer or advocate.

== Number of applications ==
The Ministry of Justice assumed the number of applications would increase to 125 a year from only 8 per year, with perhaps 38 applications leading to full investigations. Instead, it received 200 applications in the first 10 months, compared with less than 170 for a Royal Prerogative of Mercy in the previous 23 years.

Since the Commission launched in July 2000, a total of 545 applications have been made from individuals claiming they have been wrongly convicted or sentenced (as at June 2025). The Commission has received applications involving a broad range of offences, including homicides, sexual offences, serious and complex fraud and less serious offences. Forty-seven applications related to murder or manslaughter convictions. One hundred and twenty-nine cases, or 46 per cent, involved convictions for sexual offences – 70 against adults and 59 against minors. Other applications are related to convictions for violent offending (14 per cent), dishonesty and fraud (9 per cent), and drugs (8 per cent).

More than a third of the applications relate to convictions that occurred in the last five years. However, 23 of the applications are for cases that are more than 21 years old. Nearly 75% of applications are from current prison inmates, but nearly a quarter are for individuals in the community who have historical convictions they’re still contesting.

One hundred and ninety-one cases are still at the initial stages of the investigative process and, so far, only 12 cases have led to a full investigation by the Commission.

== Decisions ==
As at November 2024, the Commission has decided to take no action or no further action on 251 applications for a variety of reasons: in 128 cases, it was 'not in the interest of justice', and in another 87 cases, the appeals process was still available to the applicant.

In 2025, investigative journalist Mike White reported that in the last five years, the CCRC has received nearly 600 applications claiming wrongful conviction, but only five cases have been referred back to the courts. White says this level of referral is well below expections, and significantly less than the level achieved by similar institutions overseas.

=== Mr G. ===
In December 2022, the Commission handed down its first decision regarding the conviction of a 15-year-old male, referred to as Mr G. In 2001, he was sentenced to 11 months in prison on charges of assault, drink-driving and unlawfully getting into a motor vehicle. The law at the time required an offender facing these charges to be 16 or more before a prison sentence could be imposed. Documents filed in court by police had the wrong date of birth, indicating that Mr G was 17 and so the judge sentenced him to prison. The Commission found evidence from government agencies proving he was only 15 in 2001. It took 21 years for his case to be referred back to the courts for appeal. As at April 2023, the Court has yet to hear the case.

=== Mikaere Oketopa ===
Mikaere Oketopa, formerly known as Michael October, served 15 years of a life sentence beginning in October 1995 for the rape and murder of 22-year-old Anne-Maree Ellens. Two other men, Richard Genge and Samuel Kirner, were also convicted of murderering Ellens. They both insisted that Oketopa was not present. The CCRC said "an unusual factor, in this case, is that Genge and Kirner have consistently maintained that they did not know Oketopa and only met him at their first [court] appearance." The CCRC added that there was evidence Oketopa was asleep, passed out, in a friend's car in another part of Christchurch at the time of the murder.

When interviewed by police two days after Ellens' body was found, Oketopa admitted he had sex with her at Christchurch East School, but said it was consensual. He had been drunk at the time with little memory of events that night, and the police interview was conducted without a lawyer present. The CCRC interviewed a leading authority on false confessions, Professor Gisli Gudjonsson, who said there was a "high risk that his admissions to the police were false confessions, and that the police investigation took on a 'guilt presumptive mindset' from the time the confessions were made."

== See also ==
- List of miscarriage of justice cases#New Zealand
- List of New Zealand Police controversies
- Judiciary of New Zealand
