= Legal aid in New Zealand =

Government-funded legal assistance

The legal aid system in New Zealand provides government-funded legal assistance in limited circumstances to those who are unable to afford a lawyer. Legal aid is available for almost all court actions across all levels of the court system for those who are able to meet the rigorous eligibility requirements. This includes criminal charges, civil issues, family disputes, appeals and Waitangi Tribunal claims.

Since its inception, the cost of the service to the taxpayer has grown considerably. In 2009, the system was subject to a three-month critical review by Dame Margaret Bazley who suggested a number of changes including fixed fees for defence lawyers working on criminal cases. Bazley's recommendations were rapidly adopted by the government which wanted to cut costs.

In most cases, Legal Aid takes the form of a loan which defendants must repay. For the most serious offences, Legal Aid does not require repayment. However, in order to qualify for Legal Aid, defendants must meet certain criteria related to the seriousness of the offence or claim. And there are income limits. In 2025, single applicants must be earning less than $28,984 per year; applicants with a partner must earn less than $45,900 per year - although the applicable income level increases with the number of dependent children living in the houselhold.

As a result of legal aid's limitations and the cost-saving measures adopted in 2009, it is commonly reported by academia and the media that New Zealander's right to a fair trial is being compromised due to lack of access to counsel. In 2025, the Coalition Government ordered a review of legal aid expressing the need to make additional cost cuts.

== History ==
New Zealand judges have long had the power to assign counsel, but following the Westminster Poor Prisoners Defence Act 1903, there were moves to introduce a similar act in New Zealand. This came in the form of the Justices of Peaces Amendment Act 1912 which made legal aid available for criminal offences. The Legal Aid Act 1939 (No 42) "authorized the New Zealand Law Society to establish committees and panels of legal practitioners for the assistance of poor persons", and gave the Governor-General the ability to introduce regulations surrounding the definition of a "poor person". Although no new regulations were introduced, in practice, the law profession provided legal aid to those who members of the public who required it. Applications went to the local District Law Society and if their application was accepted, the District Law Society would arrange for a lawyer to represent them.

The processes surrounding the provision of legal aid for criminal cases were more clearly elucidated by the Offenders Legal Aid Act 1954. This gave authority to "any Court having jurisdiction in criminal proceedings may, in respect of any stage of any criminal proceedings and in accordance with this Act, direct that legal aid be granted to any person charged with or convicted of any offence, if in its opinion it is desirable in the interests of justice to do so". The court would then assign a lawyer, who was paid at the "going rate" – the same as what he or she would be paid, should they have been representing the prosecution.

The Legal Aid Act 1969 (No 47) removed responsibility for legal aid from the Law Society by establishing the "Legal Aid Board". The board's functions included managing the day-to-day functioning of the legal aid scheme, overseeing the work of District Legal Aid Committees, guaranteeing that the legal aid system was efficient, making recommendations to the Minister of Justice as required, and completing other functions that the Board may be asked to carry out. The act also outlined the circumstances in which legal aid may be refused or withdrawn, based on a means test, with the intention of making aid 'more readily available for persons of small or moderate means'. The Act also established a Legal Aid Appeal Authority which the solicitor applying for aid could appeal to if the application was declined by the Board.

The Legal Services Act 1991 repealed previous legislation and ensured that legal aid was available for both civil and criminal cases. At the same time, it widened the proceedings for which legal aid may be awarded and, for the first time, made legal aid available for Waitangi Tribunal claims. The Legal Services Act 2000 further extended the availability of legal aid to cover proceedings in the Environment Court, actions relating to leaky buildings brought under the Weathertight Homes Resolution Services Act 2006, and New Zealand Parole Board hearings.

=== Establishment of Public Defence Service ===
The Public Defence Service (PDS) is only available in New Zealand's busiest courts. It was set up as a pilot scheme in May 2004 operating solely in Auckland and Manukau. Initially, it employed 18 lawyers on a government salary instead of lawyers in private practice - with the intention of taking up to a third of the legal aid caseload at the two Courts. Following a successful evaluation, the service was made permanent at those courts in 2008 and progressively extended to other major courts in Auckland (Waitakere, North Shore, Pukekohe, Papakura).

In 2009, in response to Dame Bazley's review, and in an attempt to keep the cost of legal aid under $100 million a year, then Justice Minister Simon Power announced the PDS would be expanded to other large population centres where there were enough cases to justify the existence of both the PDS and the private bar. By 2012 the PDS was available in Wellington, Lower Hutt, Porirua, Hamilton, Dunedin and Tauranga. The PDS has also been established in Christchurch, and Hawkes Bay.

Lawyers employed by the PDS are employed directly by the government, whereas private lawyers not employed by the PDS may still provide legal aid representation, so long as they meet the criteria described under the act. PDS and private sector legal aid lawyers are still paid from the same legal aid budget.

== Increasing costs ==
The income criteria for accessing legal aid remained unchanged since 1969. But incomes and legal costs continued to rise with the result that more and more people on low incomes were being shut out of the system. Despite the lack of access, the cost of legal aid continued to grow; in 2003 the legal aid bill rose to $100 million.

In 2005 the Minister of Justice, Phil Goff, announced that income thresholds would also be raised to allow a wider range of low income-earners access to legal representation. Introducing the Legal Services Amendment Bill in Parliament, Mr Goff said the new thresholds "will be fairer to lower-income working families who are currently disadvantaged in relation to those dependent on benefits." 1.2 million people were estimated to qualify for legal aid under the new thresholds.

With more and more people accessing the system, costs have continued to grow. The total cost of legal aid in New Zealand for the year ended June 2024 was approximately $270 million. This includes $165.6 million for criminal, $70.2 million for family, $15.0 million for civil, and $19.4 million for the Waitangi Tribunal.

=== Waitangi Tribunal costs ===
Waitangi Tribunal claims have been a contributing factor to the growing cost of legal aid as Treaty claimants can apply for legal aid irrespective of their financial circumstances – which is not the case in civil or criminal cases. In 2012, about 8% of the $148 million legal aid bill was spent on treaty claims. In 2023-24, legal aid costs for Treaty claims amounted to NZD $19.4 million - just over 7% of the $270 million legal aid budget for that period.

The Law society says Treaty cases should be funded separately from other legal aid work. Former Law Society president, Jonathan Temm, says: "Legal aid was never really intended to fund the kind of demand that the Waitangi Tribunal work was making and it's skewing the figures..."

=== High profile cases ===
In 2009, a forensic accountant engaged by the Criminal Bar Association found that the cost of legal aid is boosted by the 1% of high-profile criminal cases which account for 27% of the total legal aid bill. For instance, the legal aid bill for David Bain's case, which went on for 13 years, was over $3 million. Nearly $4 million was spent defending the 18 people arrested in the Urewera terrorist raids. Other high profiles cases include Scott Watson, Mark Lundy, Teina Pora, Alan Hall, and Gail Maney.

== The Bazley review ==
In 2009, then Justice Minister Simon Power appointed an experienced public servant, Dame Margaret Bazley, to review the entire legal aid system after reports that costs were increasing due to a small group of incompetent and unscrupulous lawyers who were rorting the system. Her report, released in November of that year, said more than 200 lawyers were involved. Her report was particularly critical of "car boot lawyers" who she said used Court interviewing rooms as their offices and law library phones to make calls. Bazley also said some lawyers were demanding "top-up" payments from clients on top of what they were getting from legal aid. Bazley also quoted anecdotal evidence suggesting up to 80% of lawyers practising in the Manukau District Court were gaming the system.

=== Criticism of Bazley's report ===
Legal academics and practitioners such as Mark Henaghan, Dean of Law at Otago University, argued that Bazley's report was based on “anecdotal examples collected over a short amount of time” rather than a systematic study of the entire country. Many felt the review relied on anecdotal evidence, which led to contentious claims and made some of the statistical figures (such “80% of lawyers gaming the system” in Manukau) seem questionable. Law Society President Jonathan Temm also criticised the lack of concrete evidence in her report, saying that not naming lawyers left the society "boxing with shadows". A group of 17 lawyers who regularly work at Manukau were so upset by these claims they demanded that any evidence of corruption should be presented to the police or Serious Fraud Office.

=== Administrative changes ===
Changes implemented in response to the Bazley review included:

- tightening up eligibility criteria and the introduction of fixed fees for legal aid, rather than allowing lawyers to charge by the hour.
- interest to be charged on all legal aid debts to encourage speedy repayment
- lawyers to be assigned on a rotational basis so that offenders facing less serious charges (i.e. offences with a maximum sentence of less than 10 years imprisonment) can no longer select their own lawyer.

When Judith Collins became Justice Minister in 2011, she watered down some of Simon Power's proposals but left the fixed fees and rotational assignments unchanged. She also indicated she was "comfortable with the amount of money being spent on Treaty (of Waitangi) claims".

These legislative changes were not well received by the legal community. New Zealand Law Society President Jonathan Temm said legal aid was already underfunded and expanding the Public Defence Service would make the organisation even less efficient. In 2012 Justice Andrew Tipping, the country's longest-serving senior judge, said the recent cutbacks to legal aid had compromised the justice system: "The amount of money spent deciding whether legal aid should be granted by the Ministry of Justice would be better spent on legal representation."

== Impact of funding cuts ==
=== On justice ===
As a result of fixed fees and other measures, by 2014 the cost of legal aid had been cut by a third, dropping back to $102 million. University of Canterbury dean of law, Chris Gallavin, said the funding cuts and bureaucratic barriers meant "more lawyers were not bothering applying for legal aid, and more people were choosing to represent themselves rather than shoulder the cost of legal advice". Lawyers and academics said this was compromising New Zealander's right to a fair trial.

=== On domestic violence cases ===
Due to restrictions in the amount of money lawyers can charge legal aid clients versus fee-paying clients, many lawyers have chosen to not participate in the legal aid scheme altogether. This can have dangerous, life-or-death consequences in certain situations like domestic violence, where victims are unable to hire a lawyer who can apply for a protection or restraining order.

== Triennial Review of Legal Aid 2025 ==
In June 2025, the Ministry of Justice announced that legal aid would be reviewed and requested the public to make submissions. it claims the main objective of the review is to ensure that the scheme is efficient and sustainable while also promoting access to justice.

=== Deloittes cost benefit analysis ===
As part of its submission to the Review, the Law Society commissioned Deloittes to conduct a cost benefit analysis of legal aid. Deloittes determined that every dollar spent on legal aid led to $2.06 worth of savings to households and government - primarily through decreased family violence. Although, Deloittes assessed the benefits of legal aid paid in the family court, they did not factor in savings or benefits from legal aid paid in criminal cases, civil cases or Treaty of Waitaingi cases due to a lack of data.

Deloittes qualified their analysis indicating that the $2 return on legal aid was an extremely conservative outcome. Their report compared the return on legal aid in New Zealand with other jurisdictions, including Northern Ireland, where the return on criminal legal aid alone was £12.71 per £1 in costs.

== Legal Aid Providers ==
In May 2017 LAPA (Legal Aid Providers Aotearoa) was launched, with 136 major providers invited to a summit in Christchurch, New Zealand.

LAPA's mission statement on their website is to "improve access to justice by delivering legal aid that is both profitable and of a high quality, through efficient systems and supportive professional relationships".
