= Alan Hall (disambiguation) =

Alan Hall may refer to:

- Alan Hall (1952–2015), British cell biologist, best known for studying the role of Ras superfamily proteins in cancer
- Alan Hall, see wrongful conviction of Alan Hall

== See also ==
- Allan Hall (disambiguation)
- Allen Hall (disambiguation)
