= Liley =

Liley is a surname, and may refer to:

== Names ==
- John Liley, rugby player
- Rob Liley, rugby player
- William Liley, surgeon

== Award ==
- Liley Medal
