= Bain family murders =

1994 multiple homicide in New Zealand

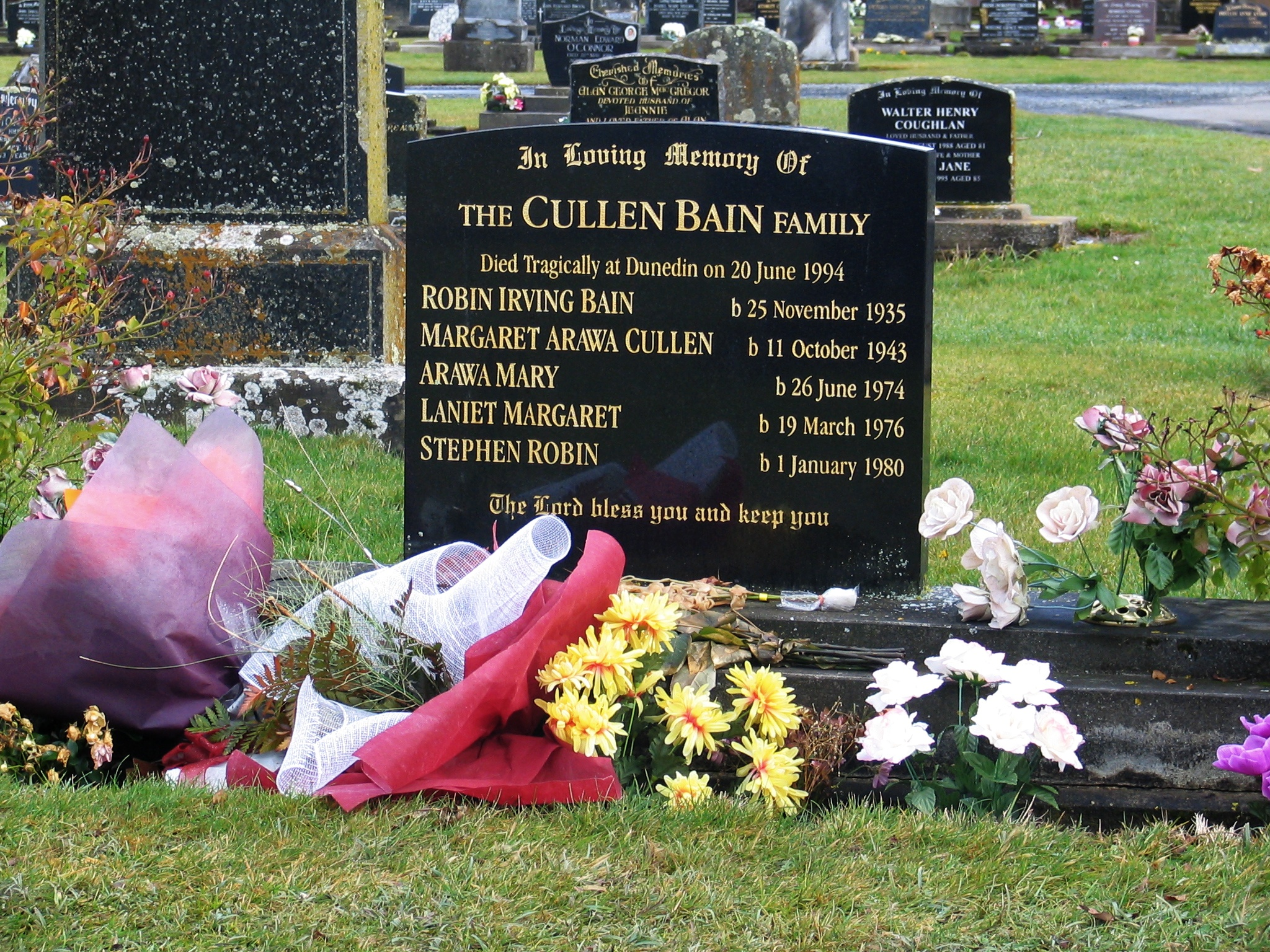
Memorial to the Cullen Bain family in Mosgiel

On 20 June 1994, Robin and Margaret Bain and three of their four children – Arawa, Laniet, and Stephen – were shot to death in Dunedin, New Zealand. The only suspects were David Cullen Bain, the eldest son and only survivor, and Robin Bain, the father. David Bain, aged 22, was charged with five counts of murder. In May 1995, he was convicted on each of the five counts and sentenced to mandatory life in prison with a minimum non-parole period of sixteen years.

David's case was taken up by businessman and former rugby player Joe Karam. In 2007, his legal team, guided by Karam, successfully appealed to the Privy Council, arguing that Robin Bain was involved in an incestuous relationship with one of his daughters. When this was about to be disclosed, he killed everyone in his family except David and then committed suicide. The Privy Council declared there had been a 'substantial miscarriage of justice'. Bain was released on bail in May 2007. The retrial in June 2009 ended with his acquittal on all charges.

The case has been described as "the most widely discussed and divisive in New Zealand's criminal history". Speculation about it continued long after David was acquitted, including whether or not he should receive compensation for the years he spent in prison. Ian Binnie, a retired justice of the Supreme Court of Canada, was appointed in November 2011 to review the circumstances and advise the government on whether compensation should be paid. Binnie concluded that the Dunedin police made 'egregious errors' and that the 'extraordinary circumstances' in the case justified the payment of compensation. This report was rejected by the Minister of Justice, Judith Collins, on advice from the police, the Solicitor-General and High Court Judge Robert Fisher.

Following Judith Collins' resignation, in March 2015 the government appointed Ian Callinan, a retired justice of the High Court of Australia, to conduct a second review of David's compensation claim. Callinan concluded that David was not innocent on the balance of probabilities. David's legal team indicated they would contest the report's findings in Court. The Government offered David an ex gratia payment of $925,000 to put an end to the drawn out dispute over compensation, which David accepted (with Karam saying that David did so “reluctantly”).

== Family background ==
Robin Irving Bain and Margaret Arawa Cullen were married in 1969 in Dunedin, New Zealand. They had four children: David (born 1972), Arawa (born 1974), Laniet (born 1976), and Stephen (born 1980). In 1991 Robin became the principal of Taieri Beach School. (Note: The Privy Council recorded the school as being Taieri Mouth Primary School, but according to James McNeish its name was Taieri Beach School.)

In June 1994, the family lived at 65 Every Street, Andersons Bay, Dunedin. The house was old and 'semi-derelict'. Photographs presented at the trial showed most of the rooms were squalid and messy with the family's belongings strewn in disorderly heaps. At the time of the murders, Robin and Margaret were estranged. Margaret Bain had developed an interest in new-age spiritualism. She referred to her husband as "a son of Belial – one of the Four Crown Princes of Hell". They used to fight and bicker, and shortly before the murders Margaret told an acquaintance that she would shoot Robin if she could. She refused to let him sleep in the house, so he often slept in the back of his van near the school. When he came home on weekends, he slept in a caravan in the garden.

At David Bain's third Court of Appeal hearing, fellow teachers described Robin at the time of the killings as "deeply depressed, to the point of impairing his ability to do his job of teaching children." Cyril Wilden, a former teacher and registered psychologist visited the Taieri School, and noted that "Robin appeared to be increasingly disorganised and struggling to cope." There were piles of unopened mail on his desk and his classroom was ‘dishevelled, disorganised and untidy’.

Laniet had been flatting in Dunedin but also lived with her father in the Taieri schoolhouse. She returned to the family residence on the Sunday evening of 19 June, the day before the murders, to attend a family meeting. At David Bain's retrial, witnesses said the meeting was called because Laniet, aged 18 at the time, wanted to disclose that her father had been committing incest with her prior to the murders.

David Bain was studying music and classics at Otago University and had a part-time job delivering morning newspapers. Arawa was attending teachers' training college (formerly Otago Teachers' College, later Otago University, School of Education) and Stephen was at high school.

== Deaths ==
On the morning of 20 June 1994, after returning from his morning paper run, David called the 111 emergency number at 7:09 am in a distressed state and told the operator: "They're all dead, they're all dead."

When the police arrived they found five members of the Bain family dead, having all suffered gunshot wounds – Robin (58), his wife Margaret (50), their daughters Arawa (19) and Laniet (18), and their son Stephen (14). All had been shot from a .22-calibre Winchester Model 490 semi-automatic rifle. A message was found typed on a computer that said "sorry, you are the only one who deserved to stay". Four days later, David, aged 22, was charged with five counts of murder.

Two weeks after the murders, the house was burnt down at the request of other family members. In the process, the carpet containing bloody footprints was destroyed – described by Judge Ian Binnie as a 'critical' piece of evidence used to convict David. The footprints were revealed when the carpet was tested with luminol on the day of the murders. Police officers admitted at the retrial that they should have cut out and retained the carpet with the bloodied footprints.

== Legal proceedings ==
=== First trial ===
David Bain's first trial lasted three weeks and took place at the Dunedin High Court in May 1995. The Crown case was that David shot his mother, two sisters and brother before going out on his morning paper run at about 5.45am. There was a struggle with his brother. He returned to the house about an hour later, typed a message on the computer that said "Sorry, you are the only one who deserved to stay" and then waited in the lounge for his father to come in from the caravan before shooting him in the head. He then rang emergency services.

The defence case was that Robin shot and killed his wife and children, then turned on the computer, typed in the message to his son and committed suicide. David returned from his paper round, found his family members dead and rang emergency services.

Dean Cottle, a witness who was expected to testify for the defence that Laniet was intending to expose an incestuous relationship with her father, failed to show up at court when called. Cottle provided a written statement to this effect but Justice Williamson found him unreliable as a witness and, in his absence, ruled against admission of his testimony. Whether Laniet intended to disclose allegations of incest against her father prior to the killings was not presented to the trial jury.

As a result, neither the prosecution nor the defence put forward any evidence about motive at the trial. The Crown prosecutor told the jury during his summing up, "It is beyond comprehension. We can't understand it. Your job is to work out who did it, not to worry about why it happened. We will probably never know why." Justice Neil Williamson told the jury that the Crown said "... that these events were so bizarre and abnormal that it was impossible for the human mind to conceive of any logical or reasonable explanation".

At the conclusion of the trial, David was convicted by the jury on five counts of murder and sentenced to life imprisonment with a sixteen-year non-parole period.

=== Support of Joe Karam ===
Former All Black rugby player Joe Karam became interested in the case in 1996, when he read a newspaper article about some university students trying to raise money for David's appeal by selling jam. He gave them some money and then studied the evidence presented at the original trial. He felt "something was wrong" with the case and spearheaded a lengthy campaign to have David's convictions overturned. He visited him in prison over 200 times and wrote four books about the case. Karam stated in his books that "[Bain's] innocence is the only possible conclusion" and that he was "totally innocent". Karam was subsequently described in some media as a 'freedom fighter' and his support helped bring about a retrial in 2009 at which David was found not guilty.

Karam's support for David came at considerable personal cost. He used to be a millionaire owning more than 20 investment properties. He no longer owns these. He worked fulltime on David's case up until the 2003 appeal and friends estimate he lost up to $4 million in terms of his time, loss of earnings and costs of legal and forensic experts. Journalist Amanda Spratt wrote: "Ten years down the track, the friends and fortune have gone. The woman he loved left him, he sold his home and he doesn't bother going to dinner parties any more, sick of them ending in an argument and a walk-out."

=== Appeals ===
The first application was made to the New Zealand Court of Appeal in 1995, principally on whether the trial judge had erred in refusing to admit Cottle's testimony. The Court refused to hear the appeal on the grounds that the "Crown case appeared very strong and the defence theory not at all plausible."

In June 1998, David petitioned the Governor-General for a pardon, which was then passed on to the Ministry of Justice. In 2000, Justice Minister Phil Goff said the investigation had shown that "a number of errors" may have occurred in the Crown's case against Bain.

=== Privy Council ===
In March 2007, David's legal team, including Karam, travelled to London to lay out nine arguments before the Privy Council as to why his convictions should be quashed. Two of the nine points concerned Robin's mental state and possible motive including the possibility that he was "facing the public revelation of very serious sex offences against his teenage daughter". The other seven points concerned questions about particular pieces of evidence. The Privy Council said there was considerable doubt that David would have been convicted if evidence discovered post-trial had been put to the jury.

The Privy Council concluded that: "In the opinion of the board, the fresh evidence adduced in relation to the nine points ... taken together, compels the conclusion that a substantial miscarriage of justice has actually occurred in this case." The Privy Council quashed Bain's convictions and ordered a retrial, but noted that he should remain in custody in the meantime.

On 15 May 2007, David was granted bail by the High Court in Christchurch. Justice Fogarty said that under New Zealand law, there was no reason for continued detention and he was bailed to the home of his longtime supporter Karam. Altogether, he served almost thirteen years of a life sentence with a minimum sixteen-year non-parole period.

=== Retrial ===
The retrial took place at the Christchurch High Court, with the jury sworn in on 6 March 2009, and David pleaded not guilty to the five murder charges. The defence introduced documented evidence about Robin Bain's state of mind and argued that he committed the murders and then committed suicide because he was having an incestuous relationship with daughter, Laniet, which was about to become public. The trial lasted about three months and the jury took less than a day to find David not guilty on all five charges.

After the retrial, New Zealand's Chief Coroner consulted with the local coroner and others to decide whether to conduct inquests into the deaths, as the verdict implied the death certificates may not be accurate. However no inquests were held; a Law Society spokesman pointed out that even if the coroner's findings disagreed with the retrial verdict, this could not lead to any further legal action against David.

Following his acquittal, David undertook a three-month European holiday paid for by his supporters. Ten months later, he was struggling to find work and had no money. Auckland defence lawyer Peter Williams QC said David would be suffering from the stigma experienced by ex-prisoners re-entering the workplace.

== Compensation ==
In March 2010, David lodged an application for compensation for wrongful imprisonment. His case fell outside Cabinet rules on compensation, meaning the government was not obliged to pay him anything, but may do so if he was able to establish his innocence on "the balance of probabilities" and was also considered to be the "victim of exceptional circumstances".

=== Ian Binnie's report ===
Because of the high-profile nature of the case, Justice Minister Simon Power chose an overseas judge – retired Canadian Supreme Court Justice Ian Binnie – to examine David's application for compensation. After a year-long investigation, Binnie concluded in September 2012 that the Dunedin police made a number of egregious errors "that led directly to the wrongful conviction", and that "on the balance of probabilities," David was innocent of the murders in 1994 and should be paid compensation for wrongful conviction and imprisonment". As part of his inquiry, Judge Binnie interviewed David over an entire day and described him as a "credible witness". By the time Binnie's report was completed, Simon Power had retired from Parliament.

Judith Collins was Minister of Police at the time David was acquitted in 2009 and was now the new Justice Minister. She disagreed with Binnie's conclusions and sought feedback on his report from the police, the Solicitor-General and former High Court judge Robert Fisher without consulting Cabinet, and before releasing it to David's legal team. Fisher claimed that Binnie had made significant errors of principle, so Collins decided another report into David's compensation claim would have to be commissioned.

Ms Collins publicly criticised contents of Binnie's report; in response Binnie accused Collins of "playing politics with the report" and claimed she had required him to keep the report confidential. Binnie said that he had weighed up the totality of the evidence both for and against David. He said the government was clearly "shopping around" for a report that would allow it to dodge paying compensation.

In January 2013, David filed a claim in the High Court seeking a review of Collins' actions, alleging Collins had breached natural justice and the New Zealand Bill of Rights Act and that she "acted in bad faith, abused her power, and acted in a biased, unreasonable and predetermined manner". In August 2014, Collins resigned as Minister following concern about other controversies she was involved in, and Amy Adams was appointed as the new Justice Minister. The judicial review proceedings against Collins were discontinued in January 2015.

=== Ian Callinan's report ===
The government commissioned a second report from a retired Australian judge, Ian Callinan. The new Minister of Justice, Amy Adams, said Callinan had been selected based on his extensive criminal experience and because he would bring a fresh perspective to the inquiry. He was instructed not to read Ian Binnie's report and chose not to talk to David in the course of conducting his investigation.

On 2 August 2016, Adams announced that Callinan had found David was not innocent "on the balance of probabilities". In reply, David said he was "disgusted" that Callinan made negative comments about him but refused to interview him, or give him the chance to reply. Joe Karam had challenged a draft version of Callinan's report, referring to it as a 'trainwreck' and a breach of natural justice. David's legal team had indicated it should be discarded or peer-reviewed, or they would contest its validity in court.

On the basis of the final Callinan report, the Crown rejected David's compensation application. However, it offered an ex gratia payment of $925,000 to settle the matter and bring closure to all parties, which David reluctantly accepted. Joe Karam said that David felt he had no choice but to accept the money because "Cabinet was never going to play fair".

== Reactions to compensation outcome ==
=== The public ===
The majority of respondents to opinion polls conducted in 2012, 2013 and 2015 thought David should receive compensation for the time he spent in prison.

=== Media ===
After the publication of the Binnie report, The Listener editorial for 3 January 2013 expressed the view that it was "elegantly written and should be required reading for anyone tempted to express an opinion on the matter". The Listener said that it was hard "to avoid the conclusion that Collins had made up her mind even before she opened it; Justice Minister Judith Collins seems to have forgotten that New Zealanders have a deeply ingrained sense of fair play."

In February 2016, before the publication of Callinan's report, journalist Duncan Garner said the New Zealand government was not providing David with a fair compensation hearing; he criticised the government for spending "millions of dollars shopping around for a report that fits their view".

=== Academics ===
Chris Gallavin, Dean of law at Canterbury University said: “The decision of the [government] to retain another judge smacks of a fishing exercise in order to receive a conclusion that best suits their desires. I contend that it was the actions of Minister Collins and the woeful treatment of Justice Binnie that compromised the integrity of the system in the first place.”

In a letter to the editor, 21 September 2012, Kenneth Palmer, Associate Professor of Law Auckland University, said: “Justice Binnie’s report on David Bain is an exemplary document. It deserves an A grade. The gathering and analysis of the evidence, consideration of the relevant legal issues and conclusions are measured and compelling… he makes no errors in his methodology and reasoning. By comparison the report of Robert Fisher QC is flawed. It says Justice Binnie made fundamental errors of principle in assessing innocence, and misconduct by the authorities. The analysis does not sustain either of these allegations.”

Christchurch barrister Nigel Hampton said "It's pragmatism overcoming principle, and from a lawyer's point of view it's slightly concerning."

=== Politicians ===
ACT leader David Seymour said he believed Mr Bain should have been paid compensation "and he should also get apologised to." Labour Party justice spokesperson at the time, Jacinda Ardern said "I think it's undeniable that the process itself has been absolutely botched." Greens co-leader Metiria Turei was also critical of the way this claim had been handled, saying it had been "appalling".

Former ACT Party leader, Rodney Hide, said "The warring sides have packed it in, without a winner or a loser, too exhausted to fight on. What we have now is an outcome pleasing no one, two reports contradicting each other, an indefensible process and an apparent admission from the top that it's not justice or principle that rules but pragmatism."

=== Cost to the taxpayer ===
The total cost to the taxpayer of the David Bain legal case was nearly $7 million. The 2009 retrial cost more than $4 million, making it the most expensive trial in New Zealand history. The three reports into whether David should receive compensation - by retired Canadian judge Ian Binnie, Australian judge Ian Callinan, and Robert Fisher QC - cost the taxpayer a total of $877,000.

== Impact on justice system ==
This case has been one of a number of high profile miscarriages of justice in New Zealand in recent years. It was a factor in the Labour Government's decision to establish a Criminal Cases Review Commission in 2020.

== Media ==
=== Books ===
- Joe Karam. David and Goliath: the Bain family murders (Auckland: Reed, 1997) ISBN 0-7900-0564-6
- James McNeish. The Mask of Sanity: The Bain Murders (Auckland: David Ling, 1997) ISBN 0-908990-46-4.
- Joe Karam. Bain and Beyond (Auckland: Reed, 2000) ISBN 0-7900-0747-9
- Joe Karam. Innocent!: seven critical flaws in the conviction of David Bain, 2001 [a booklet]. ISBN 0-473-07874-0
- Joe Karam. Trial By Ambush: The Prosecutions of David Bain, 2012 ISBN 978-1869508340
- Judith Wolfe and Trevor Reeves. In the Grip of Evil: The Bain Murders (Dunedin: Square One Press, 2003) ISBN 0-908562-64-0
- Michael Sharp. The Bain Killings Whodunnit? :ISBN 978-0-473-31230-5

=== Other ===
- Martin van Beynen. Black Hands. 10 episode podcast. (Stuff 2020).
- Black Hands drama series TVNZ, 31 October 2020.
- The Bain Family Murders. Channel 4, United Kingdom, August 2022.
- Bryan Bruce. The Investigator Special. Series 3. Episode 1. Robin Bain. TVNZ, New Zealand, July 2010.
- Bryan Bruce. A Question of Justice. 93 min docudrama. TV1, New Zealand, 2005.

== See also ==
- Arthur Allan Thomas
- Jeremy Bamber
- Teina Pora
- List of massacres in New Zealand
