= Virginia Hope =

New Zealand researcher and medical manager

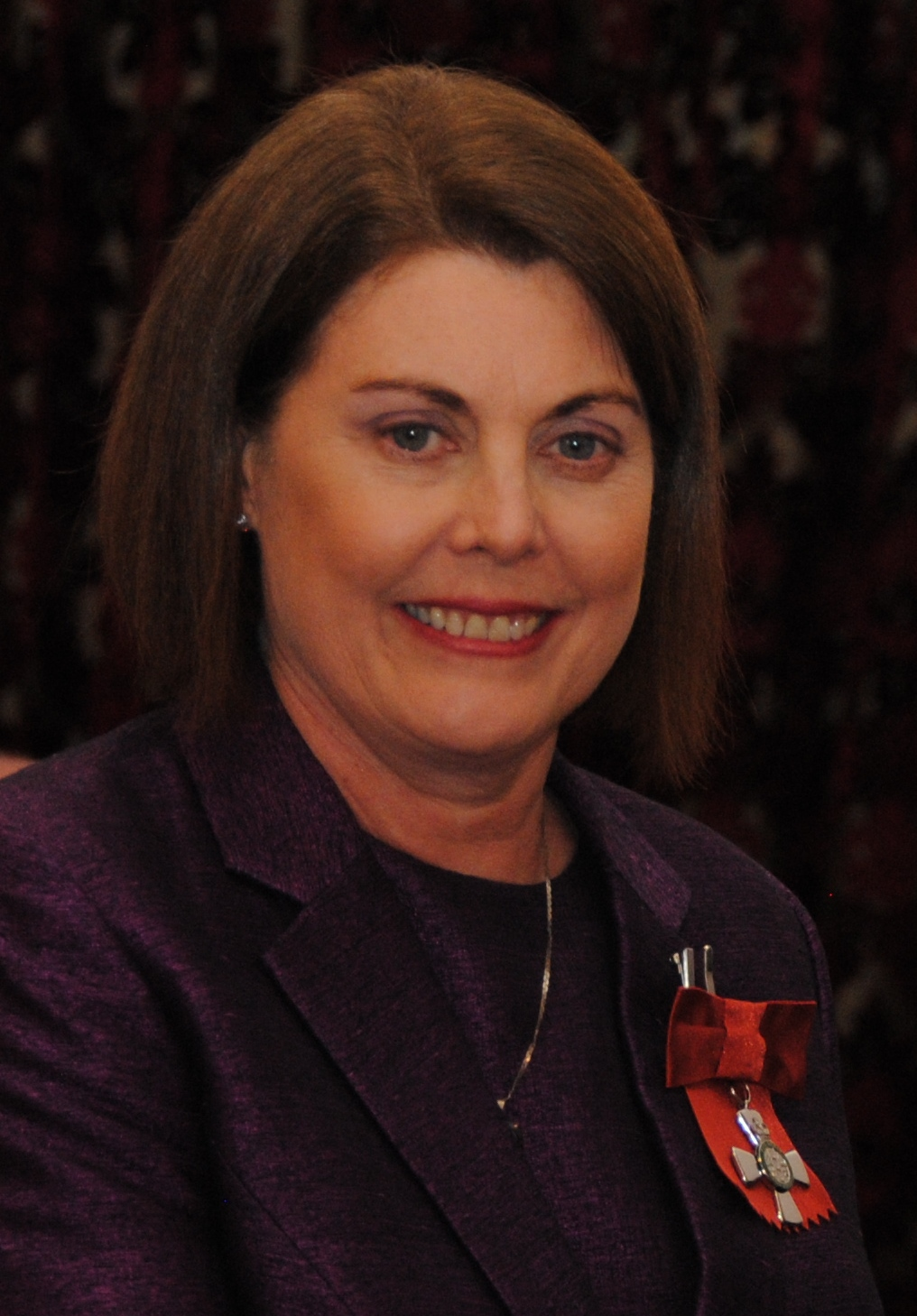
- Awards: Member of the New Zealand Order of Merit

Academic background
- Education: University of Otago, University of Auckland

Academic work
- Institutions: University of Auckland, Capital and Coast District Health Board, Hutt Valley District Health Board

Virginia Hope MNZM is a New Zealand public health specialist, researcher and public sector governance expert. In 2014 Hope was appointed a Member of the New Zealand Order of Merit for services to health.

== Academic career ==
Hope completed a Diploma of Community Health at the University of Otago and a medical degree and Masters of Philosophy at the University of Auckland. Hope served in the Auckland Regional Public Health Service as the Medical Officer of Health (Environmental Health) for ten years, and then joined the Institute of Environmental Science and Research (ESR), a Crown Research Institute, in 2006. She is the Medical Director at ESR, and has also been Chair of the Hutt Valley District Health Board and the Capital and Coast District Health Board, and an elected member of the Auckland District Health Board. She was a part of the Ministry of Health's COVID-19 Technical Advisory Group.

Hope serves on the Criminal Cases Review Commission, which investigates potential miscarriages of justice. She was appointed to the role in 2020. She is also on the board of water services regulator Taumata Arowai.

== Honours and awards ==
In the 2014 Queen's Birthday Honours, Hope was appointed a Member of the New Zealand Order of Merit for services to health. In 2020 she was awarded the Science New Zealand Individual Lifetime Achievement Award. In 2021 Hope was part of the team that won the Liley Medal for their research showing the effects of New Zealand's COVID-19 response, which was published in The Lancet.

== Selected works ==
- Simmons G; Hope V; Gillian Lewis; Whitmore J; Gao W (1 April 2001). "Contamination of potable roof-collected rainwater in Auckland, New Zealand". Water Research. 35 (6): 1518–1524. doi:10.1016/S0043-1354(00)00420-6. ISSN 0043-1354. PMID 11317899.
- Sarah Jefferies; Nigel French; Charlotte Gilkison; et al. (October 2020). "COVID-19 in New Zealand and the impact of the national response: a descriptive epidemiological study". Lancet Public Health. doi:10.1016/S2468-2667(20)30225-5. ISSN 2468-2667. PMC 7553903. PMID 33065023.
- Don Bandaranayake; Q Sue Huang; Ange Bissielo; et al. (14 October 2010). "Risk factors and immunity in a nationally representative population following the 2009 influenza A(H1N1) pandemic". PLOS One. 5 (10) e13211. Bibcode:2010PLoSO...513211B. doi:10.1371/JOURNAL.PONE.0013211. ISSN 1932-6203. PMC 2954793. PMID 20976224.
- M Ekramul Hoque; Virginia T Hope; Tord Kjellström; Robert Scragg; Roy Lay-Yee (1 September 2002). "Risk of giardiasis in Aucklanders: a case-control study". International Journal of Infectious Diseases. 6 (3): 191–197. doi:10.1016/S1201-9712(02)90110-4. ISSN 1201-9712. PMID 12718834.
- Lisa McCallum; Shevaun Paine; Kerry Sexton; et al. (29 January 2013). "An outbreak of Salmonella Typhimurium phage type 42 associated with the consumption of raw flour". Foodborne Pathogens and Disease. 10 (2): 159–164. doi:10.1089/FPD.2012.1282. ISSN 1535-3141. PMID 23360171.
- S Paine; G N Mercer; P M Kelly; et al. (17 June 2010). "Transmissibility of 2009 pandemic influenza A(H1N1) in New Zealand: effective reproduction number and influence of age, ethnicity and importations". Eurosurveillance. 15 (24): 1513–1520. ISSN 1025-496X. PMID 20576236.
- M E Hoque; V T Hope; Robert Scragg; T Kjellström; R Lay-Yee (1 March 2001). "Nappy handling and risk of giardiasis". The Lancet. 357 (9261): 1017–1018. doi:10.1016/S0140-6736(00)04251-3. ISSN 0140-6736. PMID 11293600.
