= Wrongful conviction of Alan Hall =

Alan Hall
- Known for: Wrongful murder conviction
- Criminal penalty: Life imprisonment
- Criminal status: Conviction overturned

Alan Hall was convicted for the murder of Arthur Easton in 1985. His conviction, which was later overturned, has been described as one of New Zealand's worst miscarriages of justice. In August 2023, the Government agreed to pay him $5 million in compensation, the largest nominal payout for wrongful conviction in New Zealand history.

Easton and his two teenage sons were attacked in their home by an intruder with a Swiss bayonet. All three were stabbed during the incident and Arthur Easton bled to death shortly thereafter. The intruder was described by Easton's sons and other witnesses as Māori, 6 ft (1.8 m) tall and strong. When police spoke to Hall during their investigation he admitted he used to own a bayonet. Police then interrogated him without a lawyer. Hall's autism disorder was undiagnosed at the time. Under pressure from the police, he gave conflicting information about what had happened to his bayonet.

There was no evidence linking Alan Hall to the scene of the crime. At the trial the police suppressed testimony from Easton's children that the intruder was Māori and failed to call a witness who said he saw a Māori man running away from the house. The police altered the written statement from this witness leaving out the reported ethnicity from the statement, while adding other erroneous incriminating information about Alan Hall into the statement. Police failed to disclose to the defence information about another suspect.

Aged 23, Hall was found guilty and given a life sentence. He was released on parole after nine years, but was recalled in 2012 after breaching one of his parole conditions. He was released again in March 2022. He spent 19 years in prison overall. The Supreme Court of New Zealand acknowledged a substantial miscarriage of justice had occurred and overturned his conviction on 8 June 2022. In 2024, two police officers and a prosecutor were charged with perverting the course of justice, and a reward of $100,000 was offered for information leading to the conviction of the real murderer.

== Background ==
Arthur Easton and his two teenage sons, Brendan and Kim, were attacked in their home in Papakura, New Zealand on 13 October 1985. Brendan, aged 16 at the time, was in his bedroom studying when he heard a noise at the back door. When he went to investigate, he found an intruder had broken in. An altercation occurred and Brendan screamed for help. His father was in the lounge watching television and came rushing out. His older brother, Kim also joined in the struggle. During the incident, Arthur Easton was stabbed with a bayonet multiple times. Eventually, the offender fled, but left behind a bayonet stained with blood, a wool beanie, and a muddy footprint as evidence. Mr Easton bled to death in the hallway half an hour later. His sons were both injured but survived.

Easton's sons described their attacker to police as a strong, six-foot Māori man, who did the stabbing with his right hand. Another eyewitness said to police that he saw someone running away from the home and gave the man's ethnicity as being Māori. Two months later Alan Hall became a suspect after police spoke with him when they were door knocking in the area looking for information. Hall acknowledged he had been out walking in an area located 1.5 km from the crime scene that night and owned a bayonet and beanie which matched the ones found at the crime scene.

Hall is European, 1.70 metres (5 ft 7 in) in height, and had asthma. He was described at the time as "simple and intellectually backward". His mother described him as frail, awkward and shy. At the trial, the two Easton boys who had been attacked did not identify Hall as the intruder, and none of the eyewitness reports of whoever fled the scene matched his description. His finger prints were not found at the scene nor on the bayonet. Nevertheless, he was found guilty and sentenced to life in prison. Hall was paroled in November 1994 until being recalled.

=== Recall ===
Hall was paroled in November 1994 until being recalled to prison in 2012 after concerns were raised by police and his probation officer that he had been filming rugby league matches and other sporting fixtures – even though this was done with the school’s permission. For the next ten years, prison authorities insisted he complete an intensive child sex offender treatment programme. Hall objected to this, saying he didn't understand why it was necessary. As a result, he was refused parole numerous times. In 2019, Hall received a diagnosis of autism spectrum disorder and expert testimony indicated that this may explain some of his behaviour. The Parole Board took this into account and decided his risk of reoffending was very low and released him for a second time, on 2 March 2022.

=== Conviction overturned ===
Over the 19 years he spent in prison, Hall maintained he was innocent and appealed his conviction five times. This included three requests for a pardon under the royal prerogative of mercy. As the years went by, a new investigative team, including Tim McKinnel (who helped free Teina Pora), helped to uncover the actions and omissions of the police that led to Hall’s conviction. Based on these findings, in January 2022, Hall appealed to the Supreme Court. His conviction was finally overturned in June 2022, three months after he had been released on parole. At the hearing, his lawyer Nick Chisnall said: "It is indisputable that Mr Turner’s statement was intentionally altered. Evidence was tampered with to ensure it conformed with the Crown's theory of the case, that Mr Hall was the murderer. This was grave misconduct."

== Subsequent failures by the Crown ==
In 1987, two years after the murders, Hall appealed his conviction with the help of defence lawyer, Peter Williams. The appeal was unsuccessful. Later, Hall's legal team uncovered information to help evidence a miscarriage of justice following an official information request

=== The Ministry of Justice ===
Four years later Williams presented an application for the Royal prerogative of mercy, providing proof that witness statements had been doctored and concealed by the police. Williams was described as “shattered and disbelieving” that the Ministry of Justice and the Crown simply ignored this new information.

=== Investigation by Bryan Bruce ===
In 2009, documentary maker Bryan Bruce investigated Hall’s case. Lawyer Gary Gotlieb told the Star-Times that after Bruce's documentary aired, people came forward with more information, including former police officers concerned about how the case was handled. One officer contacted Bruce anonymously suggesting Hall had been "set up" because Police wanted a quick result. He said some police officers believed they knew who the real killer was and that he had got away with it. Bruce concluded his broadcast saying that the "engineering of a false statement to go before the jury, and dubious experiments to change witness evidence, were the most blatant example of official tampering he had ever seen".

=== Investigation by Mike Wesley-Smith ===
In 2018, the Hall family, invited journalist Mike Wesley-Smith to look through numerous boxes containing records of the family’s lengthy fight to clear Alan’s name. Information in the boxes not only showed that Hall was highly unlikely to have been the murderer, it also showed the authorities had known for 30 years that his conviction was unsafe, but had done nothing about it. Wesley-Smith documented his findings in a podcast called Grove Road in 2018. He also approached the Ministry of Justice suggesting they take another look at the case. The Ministry had already rejected three previous applications by Hall, and refused to act. Wesley-Smith said the Ministry displayed "a complete absence of concern".

In 2018, former Detective Senior Sergeant Kelvin McMinn, told Wesley-Smith that the incriminating alterations to Ronald Turner’s statement were made on the advice of the Crown prosecutor at the time. Wesley-Smith then wrote to Crown Law about the case. He provided them with court documents, Turner’s police statements, an affidavit from Turner saying his evidence had been changed without his knowledge and asked for a response to this evidence. Crown Law replied saying it wasn’t possible for the Crown to examine Hall’s conviction.

In 2020, Wesley-Smith wrote to Crown Law again raising serious concerns about the police tampering with Turner’s statements. Crown Law replied it didn’t hold any records about the case, and could not help. Despite receiving this information from Wesley-Smith, in May 2022, in response to a query from Stuff, Crown Law then denied it had any knowledge about the case. They said they had “no record of being notified by anyone that Mr Turner’s statement was altered, prior to receiving documentation from [Alan Hall’s lawyer] relating to the current [Supreme Court] appeal in January 2022. The Solicitor-General is responsible for the conduct of Crown prosecutions. Una Jagose was solicitor general at the time (in 2018) but it was not until Hall's conviction was overturned four years later, in 2022, that she decided to launch an investigation into the Crown’s role in Hall’s wrongful conviction.

== Acquittal by Supreme Court ==
In January 2022, Hall's defence team appealed to the Supreme Court. Because the trial and original appeal had occurred so many years earlier, the Supreme Court would only agree to an appeal if the Crown Law Office supported the application. Remarkably, on behalf of Crown Law, Madeleine Laracy and Emma Hoskin finally conceded Hall had suffered a serious miscarriage of justice and should be acquitted. They acknowledged that the police interviews had been “unfair and oppressive” and said: “the Crown acknowledges the unacceptable truth that an unanswerable cause of miscarriage here, and of unfair trial, was deliberate failure by those responsible for the prosecution to disclose material that would have plainly been important in Mr Hall’s defence.” When Chief Justice Helen Winkelmann announced the court's decision to acquit Hall, she acknowledged a substantial miscarriage of justice had occurred, either from incompetence or malice.

=== Reaction from Easton family ===
Arthur Easton's family said they were "shaken and appalled by the revelations of deliberate manipulation and non-disclosure of evidence by the police and prosecution, not only at the initial trial but also during the 1987 appeal". They thanked Tim McKinnel, Alan Hall, his family, and supporters for pursuing the truth for so long and bringing the deceitful actions of the police to light; they expect the police to reopen the investigation "to bring the real killer to justice.”

=== Investigation into the Crown ===
On 9 June 2022, Solicitor-General Una Jagose announced an investigation would be held into the case, led by Wellington criminal barrister Nicolette Levy QC. Levy investigated the circumstances whereby the Crown failed to disclose crucial witness testimony to the defence; when these failures might have been identified by the lawyers who subsequently investigated the case; and what actions or inactions led to the miscarriage of justice. The inquiry also looked into what crown lawyers did with information received from Mike Wesley Smith in 2018 and 2020.

A redacted version of Levy's report was released in May 2023. She concluded that the Crown could not be expected to have done anything about the miscarriage of justice even though they were aware of it. In their review of the material presented to them by journalist Mike Wesley Smith, one email between crown solicitors said: “It’s nothing to do with us”. Even though the Crown had been aware of serious concerns about Hall's conviction since 2018, no action was taken until January 2022, when Hall’s legal team filed an appeal in the Supreme Court.

=== Investigation into police ===
In 2022, New Zealand Police also launched two internal reviews into their handling of the case in 1985. The first is a full review of the original police investigation. The second is a more targeted probe examining the circumstances around their failure to disclose all relevant evidence, the deception at the heart of Hall’s appeal.

== Compensation ==
Hall’s lawyer, Nicholas Chisnall, said the family would be seeking financial compensation for the 19 years he spent in prison. Compensation would need to be paid for the time he spent on parole as well as when he was in prison. Chisnall said: "If we succeed, the sum we're talking about will exceed that that's been paid in other cases by a very wide margin." His brother, Geoff Hall, said they were hoping Alan would receive between $5 and $6.5 million.

A retired high court judge, Rodney Hansen was appointed to review whether Alan Hall is innocent 'on the balance of probabilities' and therefore eligible for compensation. Following this announcement, Nick Chisnall urged Justice Minister Kiri Allan to accept the findings of Crown Law and the Supreme Court that Hall was innocent, not require him to prove his innocence all over gain, and direct Rodney Hansen to only consider how much Hall should be paid. Law professor, Kris Gledhill, said it was outrageous that Hall has to now prove his innocence to the Ministry of Justice yet again, adding that "it adds insult to the injury Hall has suffered for 37 years". In August 2023, the Government agreed to pay him $4,933,725 in compensation, the largest nominal payout for wrongful conviction in New Zealand history.

== Impact on Hall's family ==
Alan Hall's family stood by him and fought to have his conviction overturned for 36 years. Hall's mother supported her son and his innocence until her death. Hall's mother had to sell the family home to afford the private investigators. She died in 2012. Hall was supported by 12 family members as his conviction was overturned by the Supreme Court. Afterwards, Geoff indicated he was pleased with the crown’s decision to investigate what went wrong and hopes that individuals in the police and prosecution who contributed to the miscarriage will eventually be cross-examined under oath.

== Broader concerns about justice in New Zealand ==
Hall's lawyer, Nick Chisnall said the case "demonstrates how hard a palpably innocent person has to work to overturn a conviction” and does not believe the investigation by Nicolette Levy will lead to significant changes in what he says is "a deeply flawed criminal justice system". Chisnall points out it took 36 years for the conviction to be overturned and that "the justice system had repeatedly turned a blind eye to Hall’s situation, despite extensive proof of what had gone wrong with his case sitting in officials' files for decades".

Tim McKinnel said “I think we need to ask some pretty serious questions about not just how the police have failed – as they have – but how the Crown failed, how Crown Law failed, how the judiciary failed – because they did – and how the whole system was able to let down not only somebody as vulnerable as Alan Hall, but the Easton family". He points out that when it comes to miscarriages of justice in New Zealand: "We're seeing the same series of issues arising again and again." He said the police develop myopia and doggedly pursue confessions, which, with a vulnerable suspect often leads to false confessions. Christopher Stevenson, a leading criminal defence attorney in New Zealand, said the cases where the convictions are overturned are the 'tip of the iceberg'. He believes the known cases represent only 10% of total miscarriages of justice in New Zealand but that we never hear about these other cases.

== Subsequent events ==
=== Prosecution of police officers ===
In August 2024, the police announced that charges would be laid against two former police officers and a former Crown prosecutor who were involved in the investigation and prosecution of Alan Hall. All three have name suppression. In November 2024, it was announced they were charged with perverting the course of justice.

At the trial in July 2026, lawyers for the officers argued that Turner's description was unreliable because he didn't actually see the face of the man running away. The Crown argued that it was up to the jury to decide how reliable Turner’s evidence was. On 12 August 2026, the two former police officers involved in investigating and prosecuting Hall were acquitted of obstructing justice by the Auckland High Court.

=== Easton's murder inquiry reopened ===
In October 2024, police reopened the investigation into the murder of Arthur Easton and offered a $100,000 reward information leading to a conviction, together with immunity for anyone who had assisted or protected the killer.

== See also ==
- Crime in New Zealand
- Bain family murders
- Arthur Allan Thomas
- Peter Ellis
- Teina Pora
- David Dougherty
- Stephen Stone & Gail Maney
- Wrongful conviction of David Lyttle
