= Geoffrey Venning =

New Zealand lawyer and judge

The Honourable Geoffrey Venning

Justice of the High Court
- In office 17 October 2002 – 2026
- Appointed by: Margaret Wilson

Chief Judge of the High Court
- Succeeded by: Susan Thomas

Personal details
- Education: University of Canterbury

Geoffrey John Venning is a New Zealand lawyer and jurist. He was a High Court judge from 2002 to 2026, and served as the chief High Court judge from 1 June 2015 to 31 May 2020. He retired from the bench in 2026 and returned to legal practice.

== Education ==
Venning graduated from the University of Canterbury in 1978 with a Bachelor of Commerce degree in economics & accounting, and in 1981 with a Bachelor of Laws with honours. During his time at university, he received several awards for being top of his class: the Sweet & Maxwell Prize for Legal System in 1979, followed by the Butterworths Prize in Equity and Land Law and the Macarthur Prize in Commercial Law the next year.

== Career ==
From 1982 to 1986, Venning served as a tutor in commercial law at the University of Canterbury and has been a moderator in the law of torts for New Zealand since 1992. He has conducted several seminars for the New Zealand Law Society and has also tutored in their litigation skills course.

In 1981, Venning joined the Christchurch law firm Wynn Williams & Co, becoming a litigation partner in 1987. He was appointed as a master of the High Court (now called associate judge) in 1995 sitting in Christchurch. He was a member of both the Rules Committee and the Judicial Information Consultative Committee from 1999 to 2005 and a member of the Council of Legal Education from 2004 to 2015.

On 17 October 2002, the attorney-general, Margaret Wilson, announced Venning's appointment as a judge of the High Court sitting in Auckland. In June 2015, Venning was appointed chief High Court judge. Venning maintained the list managing Christchurch earthquake litigation and established a panel to deal with commercial cases. He presided over the trial in 2019 of serial rapist Malcolm Rewa, for the murder in 1992 of Auckland woman Susan Burdett. He also presided over the deputy prime minister Winston Peters' suit over politicians being briefed that he had been overpaid superannuation. Venning resumed his role as a full-time judge of the High Court on stepping down as the chief judge on 31 May 2020.

In 2026, Venning retired as a High Court judge, and was granted retention of the title The Honourable for life. He returned to practice with Britomart Chambers in Auckland.
