= Allan Hall =

Allan Hall may refer to:

- Allan Hall (footballer) (1908–1983), English footballer
- Allan Hall (journalist) (1929–2001), British journalist
- Allan Hall (footballer, born 1938), English footballer, see List of Oldham Athletic A.F.C. players (25–99 appearances)
- Allan Hall, Contemporary Christian music artist, founding member of Selah, pianist and singer

== See also ==
- Allen Hall (disambiguation)
- Alan Hall (disambiguation)
