= Allen Hall =

Allen Hall may refer to:

- Allen Hall Seminary, London, United Kingdom
- Allen Hall (University of Pittsburgh), United States
- Allen Hall (University of Oregon), United States; see Campus of the University of Oregon
- Allen Hall Theatre, University of Otago, New Zealand
- Allen Hall (special effects artist) (born 1946), American special effects artist
- Allen Hall (billiards player), world championship finalist in 1931

== See also ==
- Alan Hall (disambiguation)
- Allan Hall (disambiguation)
