= Margaret Bazley =

New Zealand public servant

Dame Margaret Bazley ONZ DNZM
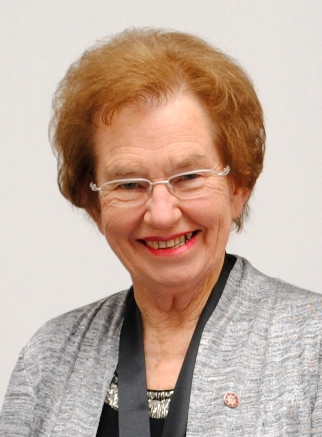
- Bazley in 2011
- Born: Margaret Clara Hope; 23 January 1938 (age 88); Paeroa, New Zealand
- Occupation: Public servant

Dame Margaret Clara Bazley ONZ DNZM (née Hope, born 23 January 1938) is a New Zealand public servant. She began her career as a psychiatric nurse and rose through the ranks to senior leadership positions at psychiatric hospitals and district health boards. In 1978 she became the Director of Nursing at the Department of Health, the chief nursing position in New Zealand and at that time the most senior position in the public service held by a woman, and in 1984 became the first female State Services Commissioner. She subsequently held top positions at the Department of Transport and the Department of Social Welfare.

In 2012 Bazley was made an additional member of the Order of New Zealand, New Zealand's highest honour. She has continued with public sector work throughout her retirement and has a reputation for reform, transformational leadership and problem-solving.

== Early life and nursing career ==
Bazley was born in Paeroa on 23 January 1938. She has said that as a child she had the ambition of becoming a psychiatric nurse.

Bazley attended Waihi College, and left school at 18 to begin working as a psychiatric nurse in Wellington. In the late 1950s, she earned a Diploma of Nursing from Massey University. She became the charge nurse at Tokanui Hospital in 1961, and rose quickly through the ranks to become assistant matron at Seacliff Mental Hospital in 1963, and matron at Sunnyside Hospital from 1965 to 1973.

In later life Bazley has said that she regards her time as matron at Sunnyside Hospital as the pinnacle of her nursing career, because she and her team were at the forefront of a change from a custodial psychiatric care model to a model based on therapy. She was the lead author of a textbook The Nurse and the Psychiatric Patient (1973), and had a paper about the hospital published in an international journal. She was an early proponent of deinstitutionalisation and of treating psychiatric patients as human beings. Another of her achievements in this role was to unify the facility; both staff and patients had previously been separated by gender.

In 1971, Bazley was elected President of the New Zealand Nurses Association (now part of the New Zealand Nurses Organisation), and she held this position from 1972 to 1974. She advocated in this role for better pay and respect for nurses.

Bazley held other leadership positions at hospitals over the next few years: in 1973 she worked as the Senior Public Health Nurse in the Auckland District Health Office, from 1974 to 1975 she was the Deputy Matron in Chief for the Auckland Hospital Board, and from 1975 to 1978 she worked as the Chief Nursing Officer of the Waikato Hospital Board. Before she left the nursing profession, she was instrumental in transferring nursing education in New Zealand from hospitals into the education system.

== Career in the public service ==
In 1978, Bazley became the Director of Nursing at the Department of Health. This was the chief nursing position in New Zealand and at that time the most senior position in the public service held by a woman. In 2013, Bazley commented: "For years I was usually the only woman in a crowd of men, giving rise to many memorable experiences, such as being taken to parliamentary committees and put in the front row so that all could see that the Health Department had a woman in its senior ranks". She held this role until 1984.

In 1984, Bazley was appointed as the first woman Commissioner of the State Services Commission (one of four State Services Commissioners in post at that time). She was the driving force behind New Zealand's public sector restructuring that took place in the 1980s and the replacement of government departments with state-owned enterprises. Her role also involved work on equal employment opportunities for women and the establishment of the Ministry of Women's Affairs.

From 1988 to 1993, she was the Secretary for Transport, a role which made her the first woman to head a major government department. In this role she helped lead de-regulation in the transport sector, introduced initiatives to reduce the road toll and significantly reduced the department's workforce.

From 1993 to 2001, Bazley was the Director-General of the Department of Social Welfare. During this time she oversaw the major restructuring of the department, and the establishment of Work and Income New Zealand, the Department of Child, Youth and Family Services and the Ministry of Social Policy, which was then amalgamated with the Department to become the Ministry of Social Development in 2001.

== Retirement and later career ==
Despite retiring from the public service in 2001, Bazley has continued to hold a number of important public sector roles, particularly in governance and conducting high-profile inquiries. From 2001 to 2008, she was the chairperson of the Foundation for Research, Science and Technology. From 1998 to 2011 she was the chairperson of the New Zealand Fire Service Commission. She was a member of the Waitangi Tribunal from 2001 to 2011 and continued to sit on ongoing inquiry panels after this date. From 2006 to 2013, Bazley was the Registrar of MPs' Pecuniary Interests, responsible for compiling and maintaining the register of MPs' pecuniary and certain other interests. From 2007 to 2008, Bazley was one of the three commissioners of the Royal Commission on Auckland Governance, established to investigate local government arrangements in Auckland, and the commission's report led to the establishment of the unitary Auckland Council. Bazley has also continued voluntary work in her retirement, and is the patron of the New Zealand College of Mental Health Nurses and the United Fire Brigades' Association of New Zealand.

Balzey has had particular influence in justice system reforms. Bazley led a Commission of Inquiry into Police Conduct, launched in 2004 after Louise Nicholas made rape allegations against high-ranking New Zealand police officers. She issued her report in 2007 which identified a number of systemic issues and matters of misconduct and made 60 recommendations (47 for the Police, 12 for the Independent Police Conduct Authority and one for the government). Her findings were accepted by the Commissioner of Police and a ten-year monitoring and reporting regime was put in place. In 2009, Bazley was appointed by then Minister of Justice Simon Power to review legal aid in New Zealand after reports that lawyers were taking advantage of the system. Her report, released in November of that year, found that the system was facing serious challenges and system-wide failings, and was indeed open to abuse by a small but significant number of corrupt lawyers. Her report led to a number of reforms including the introduction of new legislation and the expansion of the Public Defence Service.

Bazley was the chairwoman of the commissioners of regional council Environment Canterbury from 2009 to 2016. The government appointed her to the role after dismissing the elected councillors in 2009. In its report on her appointment, Christchurch newspaper The Press described Bazley as the "chief government troubleshooter". On her retirement she was praised by local groups including Ngāi Tahu and Federated Farmers for contributing to significantly improved relationships between their members and the council. Christchurch mayor Lianne Dalziel praised Bazley for her "legacy of excellence" during her public service career. The Press editorial said she had "left the region stronger" and that her standout achievement was to "galvanise the region's 10 mayors into a shared vision through the Canterbury Regional Economic Development Strategy".

In 2018, Bazley was engaged by New Zealand law firm Russell McVeagh to lead an inquiry into claims of sexual harassment and assault at the firm. Her report was published in July 2018. She found that the firm had a "work hard, play hard" culture that involved excessive drinking and in some cases inappropriate behaviour, but that this culture had changed over the past couple of years. She also found failings in the firm's response to the incidents and made 48 recommendations for improvement, which were accepted by the firm. The president of the New Zealand Law Society, Kathryn Beck, said the report was an "important milestone in shining light into the dark corners of our profession" and that she hoped it would help improve the culture of New Zealand law firms.

== Honours and awards ==
Bazley was awarded the New Zealand 1990 Commemoration Medal in 1990, and the New Zealand Suffrage Centennial Medal in 1993.

In the 1999 Queen's Birthday Honours, she was appointed a Dame Companion of the New Zealand Order of Merit, for public services, lately as chief executive of the Department of Social Welfare. She was made an additional member of the Order of New Zealand in the 2012 Queen's Birthday and Diamond Jubilee Honours. She said she felt that the thousands of public servants she had worked with during her career also shared in this honour.

Bazley received a Sir Peter Blake Leadership Award in 2011. She is also a Fellow of the New Zealand Institute of Management and a Fellow of the Chartered Institute of Transport.

Several universities have recognised Bazley for her contributions to public life. She received an honorary Doctor of Letters from Massey University in 2008, an honorary degree in natural resources from Lincoln University in 2018, and an honorary Doctor of Laws from Victoria University of Wellington in 2019. The Chancellor of Victoria University described her as "one of this country’s most accomplished public servants".
