= Minister for the Prevention of Family and Sexual Violence =

Minister of the New Zealand Government

Minister of for the Prevention of Family and Sexual Violence
- Coat of arms of New Zealand

- Flag of New Zealand

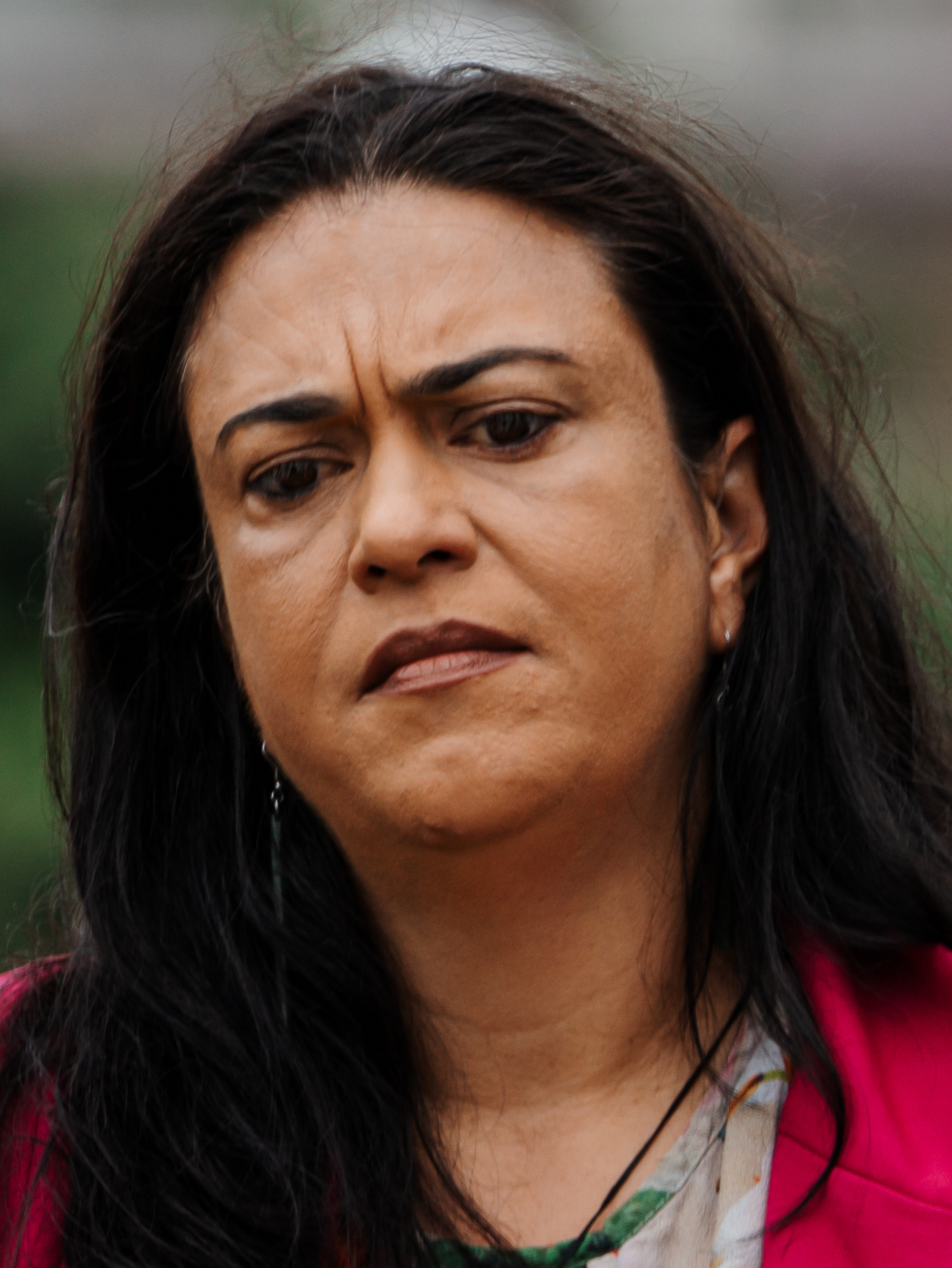
- Incumbent; Hon Karen Chhour since 27 November 2023
- Ministry of Justice; Ministry of Social Development
- Style: The Honourable
- Member of: Cabinet of New Zealand; Executive Council
- Reports to: Prime Minister of New Zealand
- Appointer: Governor-General of New Zealand
- Term length: At His Majesty's pleasure
- Formation: 6 November 2020
- First holder: Hon Marama Davidson

The Minister for the Prevention of Family and Sexual Violence is a minister in the New Zealand Government responsible for leading the Government approach to addressing and combating domestic violence in New Zealand. The position was first established during the Sixth Labour Government of New Zealand following the 2020 New Zealand general election.

The incumbent Minister is Karen Chhour, a member of the ACT Party.

== Role and responsibility ==
The Minister for the Prevention of Family and Sexual Violence is primarily part of the New Zealand Ministry of Justice, although a number of other Government agencies also provide support for the role. According to the Government website, the Minister is responsible for leading the whole-of-government approach to substantially prevent, reduce and address family and sexual violence, and for the joint venture on the prevention of family and sexual violence.

The office holder is in charge of coordinating in the government budget relating to the issue of family and sexual violence, and is also a member of the Ministerial group on Child and Youth Wellbeing Strategy.

== History ==
The role was created after the Sixth Labour Government of New Zealand was re-elected to a second term in a landslide election victory, the office was officially created on 6 November 2020, following in the swearing in of the 53rd New Zealand Parliament and the second Jacinda Ardern ministry.

The position is a loose spiritual successor to the Parliamentary Under-Secretary for Justice (Family and Sexual Violence Issues), which was held by Green MP Jan Logie during the first term of the Sixth Labour Government.

== List of officeholders ==
Key

Labour Green National ACT

No.	Name	Portrait	Term of Office		Prime Minister
1	Marama Davidson		6 November 2020	27 November 2023	Ardern
1	Marama Davidson		6 November 2020	27 November 2023	Hipkins
2	Karen Chhour		27 November 2023	Incumbent	Luxon
