= Nigel Hampton =

New Zealand lawyer (born 1943

Nigel Hampton CNZM OBE KC
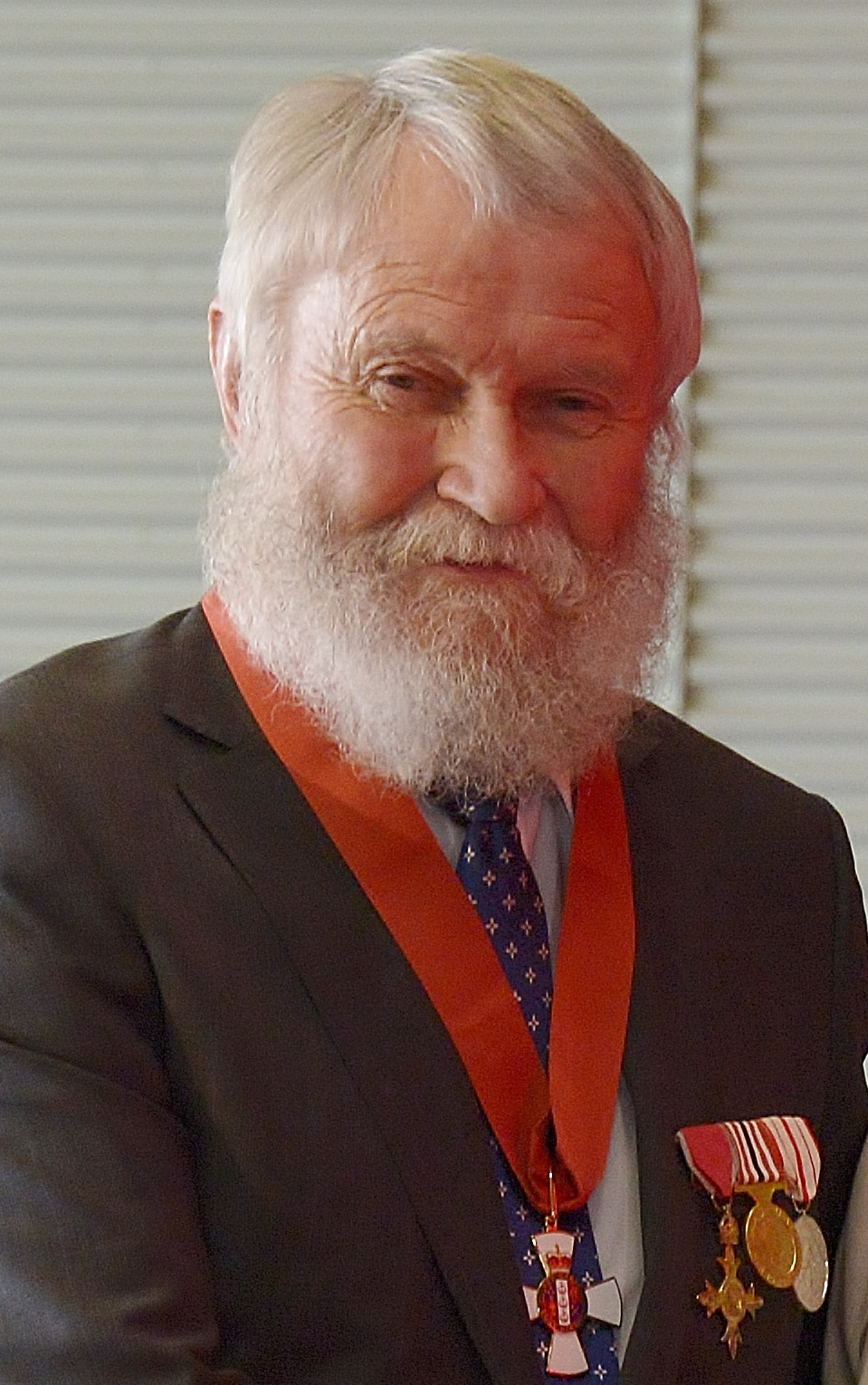
- Hampton in 2018

Chief Justice of Tonga
- In office 1995–1997
- Preceded by: Gordon Ward
- Succeeded by: Jack Lewis

Personal details
- Born: Kenneth Nigel Hampton; 28 August 1943 (age 83) Leeston, New Zealand
- Education: University of Canterbury
- Occupation: Lawyer

Kenneth Nigel Hampton CNZM OBE KC (born 28 August 1943) is a New Zealand lawyer. Over his career he has worked on more than 100 murder trials, gaining a reputation as one of the country's leading criminal defence lawyers.

== Early life ==
Hampton was born in Leeston on 28 August 1943, the son of Gladys Ruth Hampton (née Ridden) and Ian George Hampton. He was educated at Southbridge District High School and St Andrew's College, Christchurch, and went on to study law at the University of Canterbury, graduating with a Bachelor of Laws degree in 1965. In his final year of study, he was awarded the Canterbury District Law Society's gold medal as the top law student.

== Career ==
=== Legal practice ===
After being admitted as a barrister and solicitor in February 1965, Hampton joined the Christchurch law firm R. A. Hunter Young and Co. (now Hunter Young) as a law clerk, rising to become a senior partner. Specialising in litigation, he increasingly focused on criminal cases as his career progressed. In 1988, Hampton left to practise as a barrister sole.

Between 1995 and 1997, Hampton served as Chief Justice of Tonga; he was the first New Zealander appointed to the role—it having previously been undertaken by jurists from Britain—and later described it as an "interesting experience". He subsequently returned to legal practice in New Zealand.

Over his career, Hampton has worked on over 100 murder trials, and has been involved in some of New Zealand's most high-profile legal cases. In 1976, he represented Labour MP Gerald O'Brien in a depositions hearing where O'Brien was charged with indecencies against two boys that he allegedly asked back to motel room, and was successful in having the charges thrown out.

Hampton was counsel for the Engineering, Printing and Manufacturing Union at the royal commission into the 2010 Pike River Mine disaster, and subsequently represented victims' families pro bono in several court cases, culminating in the Supreme Court's finding in 2017 that that the agreement to drop health and safety charges against mine management was unlawful.

Following the collapse of the CTV Building in the February 2011 Christchurch earthquake, Hampton represent the families of some victims at the 2012 royal commission into the incident, as well as in other legal proceedings.

In 2019, Hampton represented Peter Ellis at the Court of Appeal; Ellis' conviction was posthumously quashed by the Supreme Court in 2022.

=== Professional service ===
In 1972, Hampton helped initiate the first duty solicitor scheme in New Zealand.

Hampton was a member of the Canterbury District Legal Aid Committee between 1974 and 1981, and served on the New Zealand Legal Aid Appeal Authority between 1981 and 1986. In 1982 and 1983, he was a member of the Minister of Justice's working party on access to law, and he was on the New Zealand Criminal Law Reform Committee between 1983 and 1986.

Between 1978 and 1987, Hampton was a Canterbury District Law Society councillor, the last two years of which he served as the society's president. He was a councillor of the New Zealand Law Society from 1984 to 1989, and was president of the society between 1987 and 1989.

Hampson was a disciplinary commissioner of counsel at the International Criminal Court (ICC) from 2007 to 2011, and in 2014 he was elected as an alternate member of the ICC's Disciplinary Appeals Board for a four-year term. He has also served as a member and chair of the New Zealand Law Practitioners' Disciplinary Tribunal.

In 2020, Hampton was appointed to the Criminal Cases Review Commission, a role that he resigned in 2024 after the Minister of Justice, Paul Goldsmith, replaced Colin Carruthers with Denis Clifford as chief commissioner.

Hampton has been a judicial officer for New Zealand Rugby and World Rugby, and is the patron of the Howard League for Penal Reform.

=== Reputation ===
Over many years, Hampton has been regarded as one of New Zealand's best criminal lawyers. In 1995, he was described by the president of the Canterbury District Law Society as a "successful and determined champion of the underdog". The 2025 LawFuel power list called Hampton "a legend at the bar" with a "towering career now in its twilight".

== Other activities ==
Outside of the law, Hampton was a board member of KidsCan, a charity working to address child poverty in New Zealand, for 10 years. He has been patron of the Okains Bay Museum since 2020, and previously served as chair of the museum's trust board. Hampton's memoir, A Life Forensic, is scheduled for release in November 2026.

== Honours and awards ==
In the 1988 Queen's Birthday Honours, Hampton was made an Officer of the Order of the British Empire, for services to the legal profession. The following year, he was appointed Queen's Counsel, and in 1990 he received the New Zealand 1990 Commemoration Medal. He was also awarded the King Tāufaʻāhau Tupou IV Coronation Silver Jubilee Medal. Hampton was appointed a Companion of the New Zealand Order of Merit, for services to the law, in the 2018 Queen's Birthday Honours.
