= William Liley =

New Zealand doctor (1929–1983)

Sir William Liley KCMG FRSNZ
- Born: Albert William Liley; 12 March 1929; Auckland, New Zealand
- Died: 15 June 1983 (aged 54); Auckland, New Zealand
- Occupation: Perinatal physiologist

Sir Albert William Liley KCMG (12 March 1929 – 15 June 1983) was a New Zealand medical practitioner, renowned for developing techniques to improve the health of foetuses in utero.

== Education and career ==
Liley graduated from Otago Medical School at the University of Otago in Dunedin, in 1954. After a period at Australian National University in Canberra, he returned to Auckland where he worked for the rest of his life except for a brief period at Columbia University. While in Auckland he held a number of posts, including at Auckland University, National Women's Hospital and the Medical Research Council of New Zealand (now the Health Research Council of New Zealand).

In 1963, after three unsuccessful attempts, Liley successfully carried out the first ever successful intrauterine blood transfusion. The foetus had Rh disease/hemolytic disease and had been expected to die before birth. The highly publicised procedure was a milestone in not only medical treatment but also public perception. Initially the procedure had a success rate of only about 40%, but this rose over time.

Liley was awarded fellowships with the American College of Obstetricians and Gynecologists and the Royal College of Obstetricians and Gynaecologists, and was appointed to the Vatican's Pontifical Academy of the Sciences, although he was an atheist. He was also a Fellow of the Royal Society of New Zealand. In the 1967 Queen's Birthday Honours, Liley was appointed a Companion of the Order of St Michael and St George, for valuable services to medicine. In the 1973 Queen's Birthday Honours, he was promoted to Knight Commander of the Order of St Michael and St George, for distinguished service to medicine.

== Activism ==
Liley was one of the founders of the New Zealand anti-abortion group, the Society for the Protection of the Unborn Child (now Voice for Life), in 1971 and served as that organisation's first president. In 1977, Robert Sassone edited a series of interviews with Liley and Jérôme Lejeune, entitled The Tiniest Humans.

== Personal life ==
Liley met his future wife Helen Margaret Irwin Hunt (known as Margaret) as a classmate in medical school; they married in 1953. They had five biological children and an adopted child with Down syndrome.

The family maintained a 200-acre (81 ha) block outside Benneydale in the King Country where Liley exercised a passion for silviculture.

Liley committed suicide in 1983. Margaret, Lady Liley, died in 2025.

== Liley Medal ==
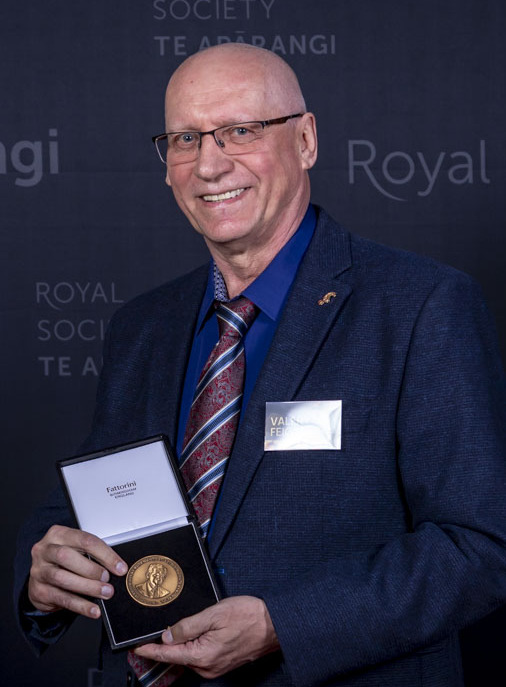
2022 Liley Medal winner Valery Feigin

Since 2004 the Health Research Council of New Zealand has annually awarded the Liley Medal in recognition of an outstanding contribution to medical research.

- 2004: Richie Poulton, University of Otago
- 2005: Richard Faull, University of Auckland
- 2006: Lianne Woodward, University of Canterbury
- 2007: Innes Asher, University of Auckland
- 2008: Ted Baker, University of Auckland and Philippa Howden-Chapman, University of Otago
- 2009: Allan Herbison, University of Otago
- 2010: Stephen Robertson, University of Otago
- 2011: Chris Pemberton, University of Otago
- 2012: No award
- 2013: Michael Baker, University of Otago
- 2014: Ed Gane, Auckland City Hospital
- 2015: Ian Reid, prominent in international bone research (also awarded the Rutherford Medal), University of Auckland
- 2016: Mike Berridge, Malaghan Institute of Medical Research and Paul Young, Medical Research Institute of New Zealand
- 2017: Jonathan Broadbent, University of Otago
- 2018: Cynthia Farquhar, University of Auckland
- 2019: Ian Reid, Anne Horne and team, University of Auckland
- 2020: Professor Mark Weatherall, University of Otago, and Mark Holliday, Medical Research Institute of New Zealand
- 2021: Sarah Jefferies and her team at ESR, including Virginia Hope, for their research showing the effects of New Zealand's COVID-19 response, which was published in The Lancet.
- 2022: Valery Feigin, Auckland University of Technology, "for the landmark Lancet Neurology paper that showed for the first time the global, regional, and national burden of stroke and its risk factors in all the world’s 204 countries".
- 2022: Colin Simpson, Victoria University of Wellington, "for his role as a lead author of one of the first papers in the world to confirm the safety of COVID-19 vaccines."
- 2023: Michael Baker and his team, "who published two companion papers in the Lancet that represent a breakthrough in our understanding of the causes of acute rheumatic fever and the role of group A streptococcal infections".
- 2024: No award
- 2025: Logan Walker, University of Otago, Christchurch, lead author of a paper that "has helped integrate complex RNA splicing biology into practical clinical recommendations that are now being used by major diagnostic laboratories in New Zealand and internationally".
