= Gillian Lewis (academic) =

New Zealand microbiologist

Gillian Dianne Lewis
- Education: University of Otago
- Scientific career
- Thesis: Enteric viruses in aquatic habitats (1984)

Gillian Dianne Lewis is a New Zealand microbiologist. She is a full professor at the University of Auckland and on the board of Crown Research Institute NIWA.

== Academic career ==
After a PhD from the University of Otago,"Enteric viruses in aquatic habitats", Lewis moved to the University of Auckland and rose to full professor.

Much of Lewis's work involves biofilms. Lewis was awarded a New Zealand Microbiology Society Distinguished Orator Award.

== Selected works ==
- Lewis, Gillian D., and THEODORE G. Metcalf. "Polyethylene glycol precipitation for recovery of pathogenic viruses, including hepatitis A virus and human rotavirus, from oyster, water, and sediment samples." Applied and Environmental Microbiology 54, no. 8 (1988): 1983–1988.
- Simmons, Greg, Virginia Hope, Gillian Lewis, John Whitmore, and Wanzhen Gao. "Contamination of potable roof-collected rainwater in Auckland, New Zealand." Water Research 35, no. 6 (2001): 1518–1524.
- Anderson, S. A., S. J. Turner, and G. D. Lewis. "Enterococci in the New Zealand environment: implications for water quality monitoring."Water Science and Technology 35, no. 11-12 (1997): 325–331.
- Lear, Gavin, Marti J. Anderson, Joanna P. Smith, Kristine Boxen, and Gillian D. Lewis. "Spatial and temporal heterogeneity of the bacterial communities in stream epilithic biofilms." FEMS Microbiology Ecology 65, no. 3 (2008): 463–473.
- Greening, G. E., J. Hewitt, and G. D. Lewis. "Evaluation of integrated cell culture‐PCR (C‐PCR) for virological analysis of environmental samples." Journal of Applied Microbiology 93, no. 5 (2002): 745–750.
