= David Dougherty =

New Zealand man wrongly convicted of rape

David Brian Dougherty (29 March 1967 – 20 April 2017) was a New Zealander who was wrongfully convicted in 1993 on charges of abduction and the rape of an 11-year-old girl. Dougherty was her next door neighbour. The girl said she was kidnapped, "tied to a tree, drugged, raped and threatened to be killed." She said she recognised Dougherty's voice and saw his face when her blindfold slipped off. Dougherty denied the allegation and voluntarily provided a DNA sample. However, the results were inconclusive. At the trial, he was found guilty and sentenced to seven years, nine months in prison.

Five months later, the Institute of Environmental Science and Research (ESR) detected another man's semen on the young girl's underclothes. Based on this new evidence, Dougherty took his case to the Court of Appeal - which was unsuccessful. Appearing in court, the young victim was certain she was correct, and made a convincing witness on the stand.

In September 1995, Lawyer Murray Gibson and DNA expert Arie Geursen arranged for two overseas experts to look into the case. In January 1996, both scientists reported that the DNA tests "showed unequivocal evidence of another man’s semen" and said the partial "match" to Dougherty reported by the ESR was "likely to be accidental cross-reactions in the test kit". In April 1996 Gibson petitioned the Governor General under the Royal prerogative of mercy. The Governor General referred the matter back to the Court of Appeal, which quashed his conviction and ordered a retrial. In 1997, based on the updated DNA evidence, Dougherty was acquitted after serving over three years in prison.

In 2003, Nicholas Reekie was found guilty of the rape.

== Compensation ==
Minister of Justice Doug Graham initially turned down Dougherty's bid for compensation claiming that he had not proven his innocence. However, he ordered a report from Stuart Grieve, QC, to assess whether Dougherty should get an ex gratia payout. Grieve confirmed that Dougherty was innocent and recommended he receive $868,728.80 to compensate for the losses and suffering he incurred. In 2001, Dougherty received a public apology along with $868,728 in compensation.

== The real perpetrator ==
In 2003, the real offender, Nicholas Reekie, was found guilty and convicted of the crime. He was sentenced to preventive detention with a minimum non-parole period of 20 years. He was convicted on 31 charges, including abduction and rape, against four females aged between 11 and 69. The girl in this case was his youngest victim, but an inquiry into the miscarriage of justice turned up a police memo suggesting the young girl had lied to the police and to the court about Dougherty, and had allowed Reekie into her room.

Altogether, Reekie has more than 100 convictions, including 23 for sexual offending and 12 for other violent crimes. Since being sentenced, he has incurred 76 misconduct charges, and made more than 2,000 complaints about his treatment in prison.

=== Role of media ===
Dougherty's case became the subject of the 2008 New Zealand telemovie Until Proven Innocent which documents the miscarriage of justice that led to his imprisonment. The film described the campaign to overturn his conviction and the roles played by journalist Donna Chisholm, Dougherty's lawyer Murray Gibson, and Arie Geursen a scientist who all advocated on his behalf.

From prison, Nicholas Reekie made a complaint to the Broadcasting Standards Authority (BSA) that the film was inaccurate and breached his privacy. The BSA rejected the complaint after which Reekie appealed that decision to the High Court. The Court dismissed his appeal as "frivalous and vexatious", adding that "Mr Reekie's submissions display a remarkable lack of comprehension of the enormity of his crimes."

== Aftermath ==
The time Dougherty spent in prison affected his mental health. Even after he was released, he became a target of overzealous individuals, who posted pamphlets wherever they could in a new area he moved to, identifying him as a child rapist.

In an affidavit, he said the fear of being attacked in prison left him unable to hold down a job, unable to function socially and he developed obsessive thoughts about death. After he was released from prison, he became homeless. He developed a drinking problem and committed a number of theft and alcohol-fuelled offences. In 2017, he appeared in the Palmerston North court following an assault on a police officer. Altogether, he incurred over 70 convictions.

At one point, he was ordered by the court to undergo a drug and alcohol assessment. During one of his Court appearances, he achknowledged his behaviour was "totally out of order" due to his drinking, which had caused pancreatitis. He died on 20 April 2017, from pancreatic cancer not long after his 50th birthday.

== See also ==
- List of miscarriage of justice cases in New Zealand
