= Deaths of Deane Fuller-Sandys and Leah Stephens =

1989 alleged murders in Auckland, New Zealand

Deane Fuller-Sandys, who worked as a tyre fitter, disappeared in Auckland, New Zealand on 21 August 1989 after going fishing. His body was never found. Leah Stephens disappeared five days later, although her body was not found for another three years. It was not until 1997, after another eight years had passed that police decided to investigate possible links between their deaths. The police developed a theory that in August 1989 Gail Maney asked Stephen Stone to kill Deane Fuller-Sandys over what the police portrayed as a drug-related dispute. Police alleged Stone carried out the hit in Gail Maney's garage in broad daylight in front of at least eight other people; that he then passed the gun around and forced several other people to shoot him as well; and that a week later he raped and murdered Leah Stephens, said to be one of the eight witnesses, to prevent her going to the police.

No forensic evidence was presented linking any of the defendants to the alleged victims. The prosecution relied entirely on the testimony of two men and two women the police said were witnesses, all of whom were granted legal immunity. The two men were alleged to have actually participated in the murder of Fuller-Sandys. Based on the combined testimony of these individuals – subsequently found to be fabricated – in 1999, Gail Denise Maney (born c. 1967) and Stephen Ralph Stone (born 1969) were convicted of Fuller-Sandys' murder. Stone was also convicted of Stephens' rape and murder, and two other men were convicted of being accessories to murder.

The two women who testified they were present at Fuller-Sandys' murder later recanted, saying they were coerced by police into making false statements. During the Court of Appeal hearing in August 2024, the court heard that the two men who claimed to be present at the murder had changed their stories significantly multiple times. The lead detective, Mark Franklin, was accused of manipulating these 'witnesses' and lying to the court.

While in prison, and after she was released, Maney continued to maintain she never even met Fuller-Sandys, let alone had anything to do with his disappearance. She made numerous unsuccessful appeals, but was eventually released on parole, after spending 12 years in prison. However, she was recalled four times, spending a total of 16 years inside. In 2020, Stephen Stone also appealed against his convictions.

The case was subject to ongoing controversy in the media, and in July 2024, the Crown prosecutor conceded that a miscarriage had occurred, In October 2024, the convictions of all four defendants were overturned and declared to have been a miscarriage of justice. Stone was released on bail a few days later, although the Court ordered he should be retried. In April 2025, the Crown prosecutor said there was no longer sufficient evidence to conduct a retrial. Stone spent 26 years behind bars before his convictions were overturned.

Private investigator Tim McKinnel said the events described by police witnesses were "complete and utter fantasies", and a wide-ranging inquiry was needed into each of the layers of the justice system that led to the convictions of four innocent people. Commenting on how long it took for the convictions to be overturned, Stone's lawyer, Annabel Maxwell-Scott observed that the state does not like to admit its mistakes, adding: "They protect the police, and they protect the convictions, even in the face of overwhelming, irrational, illogical evidence."

== Disappearances ==
On 21 August 1989, Deane Wade Fuller-Sandys, a 21-year-old Auckland tyre-fitter, left home to go fishing. He never returned. His body was never found and authorities initially believed he probably drowned after being swept out to sea at West Auckland's Whatipu Beach, where his car was discovered shortly afterwards. An old friend of Fuller-Sandys later told police that he may have committed suicide, as he had just broken up with his girlfriend.

Five days later, on 26 August 1989, Leah Romany Stephens, a 20-year old Auckland sex worker, disappeared. Her skeletal remains were discovered in a forest near the Muriwai Golf Course three years later, in June 1992. There were no obvious injuries to the skeleton and the cause of death could not be determined.

After Stephens' skeleton was found in 1992, police launched a murder investigation, but it did not lead to an arrest at the time.

== Police investigation ==
After an unsubstantiated tip-off eight years after the disappearances, police began interviewing anyone who might have information. Gail Maney was a former sex worker. Based on interviews with her acquaintances, including former flatmates and a neighbour, police developed a theory that Fuller-Sandys had sold Maney drugs; that she believed Fuller-Sandys was responsible for a burglary of her rental home in 1989 during which the drugs were retrieved and clothing was stolen; and that she then persuaded 19 year old Stephen Stone, a gang member, to kill him in revenge.

After a two-year police investigation, Gail Maney was charged with commissioning Stephen Stone to murder Fuller-Sandys. Stone was also charged with murdering Leah Stephens to ensure her silence after she allegedly witnessed Stone shooting Fuller-Sandys. Gail Maney's younger brother Colin Neil Maney (born c. 1971) and a mutual acquaintance, Mark William Henriksen (born c. 1967), were charged with being accessories to the murder of Fuller-Sandys by shooting him after Stone handed them the gun and then helping to dispose of his body.

In 2024, Julie-Anne Kincade KC, acting for Gail Maney, described evidence from the people whose initial contacts with police sparked the entire investigation as the "rumour and gossip witnesses."

== First trial ==
=== Lack of forensic evidence ===
The trial was held in March 1999 at the Auckland High Court. All four accused pleaded not guilty and Gail Maney said she didn't know Fuller-Sandys and had never even met him. The Crown prosecutor was unable to produce any forensic evidence such as DNA, blood-matches or weapons, and Fuller-Sandys' body had not been found.

=== The alleged plot to kill Fuller-Sandys ===
The prosecution case relied heavily on the testimony of four people police alleged were eyewitnesses: two men and two women who were interviewed eight or more years after Fuller-Sandys and Stephens disappeared. Based on their testimony, the police alleged that on 21 August 1989, Fuller-Sandys was enticed to come to Maney's rental home in Larnoch Road in Henderson on his way to go fishing; and that when he arrived, he was attacked by Stone, who then shot him in front of Maney and seven other witnesses, including Leah Stephens.

=== Passing the gun ===
The alleged witnesses subsequently testified that Stone passed the gun to each of four males, including Colin Maney and Mark Henriksen, and directed them to fire bullets into the body to make them complicit in the murder. The two males who were granted name suppression and immunity from prosecution stated they disposed of Fuller-Sandys' body in Woodhill Forest, although his remains have never been found. His vehicle was supposedly left at Whatipu Beach to make it appear he had drowned there.

=== The alleged murder of Leah Stephens ===
The alleged witnesses also stated that five days later, Stone, believing that Leah Stephens was likely to inform police of the murder of Fuller-Sandys, raped and then murdered her with a knife at the house in Larnoch Road. They were all granted name suppression and immunity from prosecution in exchange for their testimony. One of them was given $30,000 and a new identity.

=== Lack of disclosure ===
The judge and jury were unaware that two important documents had not been disclosed to the defence prior to the trial. One of those documents suggests the police pressured key witnesses to make up specific statements that fitted the police theory. The other highlighted collusion had taken place to get entirely different versions of events by two witnesses to make the same allegations.

Detective Senior Sergeant Mark Franklin, who led the police investigation was strongly challenged by defence lawyers over whether he had bullied these alleged witnesses, or pressured them to change their stories to match a predetermined police narrative, but he denied doing so.

Despite repeated questioning by police, one of the males who testified against Maney and Stone said he told police: "I swore black and blue that I had no knowledge of it." After spending half an hour alone with Detective Mark Franklin, he suddenly remembered both crimes – which helped police tie the two cases together.

=== Sentencing ===
After two days' deliberation, the jury found Stone and Gail Maney guilty of the murder of Fuller-Sandys. Stone was also found guilty of the rape and murder of Stephens. Both were sentenced to life imprisonment. Stone also received a 10-year concurrent sentence for raping Stephens. Colin Maney and Mark Henriksen were convicted of being accessories to the murder of Fuller-Sandys by helping to dispose of his body. Henriksen was sentenced to three years' imprisonment, while Colin Maney (the youngest of the accused) received a two-year suspended sentence.

== Subsequent events ==
=== Appeals and retrial ===
All four appealed their convictions, but Stone and Colin Maney were unsuccessful. Gail Maney and Henriksen gained a retrial on the grounds that the original trial judge had not adequately summed up the case for their defence to the jury. Both were found guilty again at their retrial in June 2000. During the retrial, one of the alleged witnesses with name suppression was asked by a defence lawyer whether he had ever asked for $30,000 to come back from overseas to give evidence. The man replied "Yes... to cover my costs, losing work."

In 2005 and 2007, Gail Maney filed further appeals (to the Court of Appeal and the Supreme Court, respectively) after one of the key females recanted her original trial testimony implicating Maney. At this time, the judges were unaware that key documents had not been disclosed to the defence, which proved that police had amalgamated differing witness statements into one incriminating narrative – and both appeals were dismissed.

==== Gone Fishing documentary ====
In June 2018, Radio New Zealand and Stuff released Gone Fishing, a documentary podcast about the case. People interviewed included Gail Maney, some of the so-called witnesses, and former detective Mark Franklin. Maney said the documentary gave her story more media attention. It led to the involvement of private investigator Tim McKinnel, who had worked to overturn the wrongful conviction of Teina Pora, and then three prominent lawyers, Julie-Anne Kincade, Nicholas Chisnall, and Aieyah Shendi, agreed to represent Maney as she continued trying to clear her name.

In December 2023, a recall application was filed on Maney's behalf asking the court to retract their 2005 decision dismissing her original appeal against her murder conviction. In addition to two key people recanting, McKinnel said one of the most concerning aspects of the appeal in 2005 was that "the trial judge from her 1999 trial, who was criticised in her 1999 appeal appeared on the appeal bench in 2005."

=== Parole ===
Maney was released on parole in 2010, but recalled in 2012, 2017 and 2020 primarily for drug related issues, with the Corrections Department claiming she was difficult to manage. Altogether, she served a total of 16 years in prison. If her conviction had not been overturned, she would have been on parole for life.

Stone also protested his innocence, but in a restorative justice meeting with Fuller-Sandys' family in 2010, pretended he killed Fuller-Sandys, telling the facilitator that he "confessed" only because it would improve his chance of getting parole. He was declined parole in December 2017, after which he reverted to his claims of innocence. In August 2020, he filed an appeal against his convictions.

=== Court of Appeal 2024 ===
In February 2024, the Court of Appeal agreed to hear the case for a third time. Then in July 2024, the Crown agreed that the convictions constituted a miscarriage of justice because two crucial documents, which should have been provided to the defence team at the trials in 1999 and 2000, were not turned over.

==== Failure to disclose documents ====
One of the documents was a fax that Franklin sent to Barry Hart, the lawyer for one of the key people involved. It contained the full statement of the other key person (whose name is suppressed). Soon after the fax was sent, Hart's client "made drastic changes to his own statement", so that it described the same version of events as the other person. Stone's lawyers said the fax was a "smoking gun" because it showed how two so-called witnesses ended up with near-identical accounts of the murders when their previous statements had been wildly divergent. His lawyers also said it implied that Franklin lied in court when he denied the two men had seen each other's statements.

The other document was a job sheet which showed that Franklin was also having secret meetings with another key person (whose name is also suppressed). Franklin had not recorded the content of those meetings, and the defence suggested this was because he coerced her into supporting the police narrative. These documents were withheld from the defence team by the Crown at the trials in 1999 and 2000 and were only disclosed in May 2024.

==== Inconsistencies in witness statements ====
During the investigation, Tania Wilson, a former friend of Maney, made eight different statements to the police, without mentioning the alleged conversation in which Maney asked Stone to kill Fuller-Sandys. However, at court she testified that Gail Maney organised the hit and also stated she witnessed Fuller-Sandys' murder. But in 2005, she retracted her evidence saying the police pressured her. One of Maney's lawyers, Jack Oliver-Hood pointed out at least nine instances where police informed a so-called witness that it was Fuller-Sandys who had been murdered, before the individual ever mentioned his name.

During the investigation, the two men who were granted immunity despite their proclaimed participation in Leah Stephens' murder gave police three different accounts of where the alleged murder took place: a car park in Queen Street, Buchanan Street in the suburb of Kingsland, and finally Maney's home in Larnoch Road.

Counsel Annabel Maxwell Scott said the police had ignored the usual rules of evidence: they included unrecorded statements; they failed to disclose key documents; they took multiple statements from people over a period of many hours; and then shared their statements. She said: "What's occurred is a labyrinth of lies" and "These accounts are fantastical and make no sense, are tainted, are unreliable, inconsistent, and lack any sort of sensible analysis."

==== Convictions quashed ====
The lawyers for Stone and Maney argued a new trial was not feasible because the police had "bullied" people into what to say, and failed to disclose documents describing their procedures, leading to a miscarriage of justice. The Crown conceded it had no case against Maney for the alleged murder of Fuller-Sandys, as the only person who implicated her at the original trial had subsequently disavowed the statements she made to the police and died in 2023. The Crown agreed the convictions of all four defendants should be quashed; however, it desired a retrial for Stone.

In October 2024 the Court of Appeal released its decision, overturning the convictions of all four defendants and ordering a retrial for Stone. In April 2025, the Auckland Crown Solicitor announced there was insufficient evidence for Stone to be retried.

==== Gail Maney's response ====
Maney would like to see the police held to account for the mistakes they made. Two weeks after she was acquitted, she wrote to the police lodging a criminal complaint against the officers responsible for her wrongful conviction and imprisonment. In her letter, she said there was never any evidence against her, that she did not even know Fuller-Sandys, let alone murder him: "The case against me, as set out in the Crown evidence at my 1999 and 2000 trials, was a fabrication, directed and facilitated by police officers."

==== Compensation ====
Claims for compensation have been lodged by all four people who were wrongfully convicted. Because of egregious conduct by the police in the case and the length of time Gail Maney and Stephen Stone spent in prison, journalist Mike White says the eventual payout could be in the millions and become the largest miscarriage of justice payout in New Zealand’s history.

== Controversies surrounding the case ==
=== Lack of forensic evidence ===
Fuller-Sandys' body has never been found, and according to McKinnel, "There is not a scrap of physical evidence to support the contention that Fuller-Sandys was murdered". The prosecution was unable to present any forensic evidence, such as DNA, blood-matches or weapons. Detective Mark Franklin, who led the investigation and was responsible for linking the two deaths, agreed. He said: "This was a case where there's no forensics; we didn't have scenes, we didn't have bodies, and [for] the evidence we relied totally on criminal associates who were involved in the crimes."

=== Participants granted immunity ===
Two men who admitted to have participated in the murders were granted immunity and given name suppression. In the podcast Gone Fishing, they were referred to by the pseudonyms "Neil" and "Martin". Martin was also given $30,000 and a new identity under the witness protection scheme. At the trial, the two men testified they were among the people in the garage in Larnoch Road when Fuller-Sandys was shot. They said they helped bury Fuller-Sandys' body in dense bush somewhere in West Auckland, and that they were present when Leah Stephens was raped and murdered.

Doubts about the reliability of their evidence were raised because both men provided conflicting versions of events; they gave the police different locations for the murder of Leah Stephens, and only reached agreement after police showed them parts of each other's video interviews and statements. "Martin" initially denied knowledge of two murders. However, at one point during the investigation, he spent half an hour alone with Franklin and immediately revised his statements to say he remembered both killings – which helped the police tie the two cases together. Speaking to Stuff for the podcast Gone Fishing in 2018, Martin attributed this to recovered memory syndrome.

Tim McKinnel wondered whether the Solicitor General was aware that Neil and Martin had given between 15 and 20 different versions of events before granting them immunity for rape and murder. Law professor Kris Gledhill said that Neil and Martin appeared to have "participated in more criminality than was alleged against [Gail] Maney" and questioned whether immunity should be granted to those who could be a greater risk to public safety than the person they are giving evidence against.

=== Recantations of two alleged witnesses ===
Two women who testified that they were present when Fuller-Sandys was killed later retracted their statements. In February 2005 at a Court of Appeal hearing, Tania Wilson said she gave false evidence at Maney's two trials, which implicated Maney in the killing of Fuller-Sandys. She said the police put her under pressure to testify against Maney, saying that she feared losing her children and going to prison unless she went along with the police narrative.

The court decided she was unreliable, believing she may have colluded with Maney and 'cooked up' this story while they were in prison together in 2000. The Crown produced an affidavit from a police Inspector, Bill Searle, who said that a Corrections Officer, Dave Kupenga, had called him, warning that the two women were in adjacent cells in Mt Eden Women's Prison.

Kupenga subsequently told RNZ "I never did anything of the sort," suggesting someone had either impersonated him or used his name to provide false evidence. Prison documents obtained by RNZ also revealed Maney was "in an entirely different part of the prison" to Wilson and the two would have had "no opportunity to have any interaction". The Court was unaware of this at the time and dismissed Maney's appeal. Wilson died in late 2023.

In July 2019, a second woman, who has name suppression and gave evidence in the trial that convicted Gail Maney, said she lied that she was present at the shooting of Fuller-Sandys after being "threatened and harassed" by police. She said police did not interview her until 1997, eight years after Fuller-Sandys went missing, and that police pressured her by coming to her house in "marked and unmarked cars, sometimes in large numbers... They would search my house, [and] told me that they were going to make my life a misery if I didn't start playing ball, which meant admitting to my so-called role in his murder." She said she gave a false statement after police threatened to take away her young child but added: "My view was that he wasn't murdered and he was washed off the rocks fishing."

The second woman's story has been corroborated by Andrew Thompson, a former Henderson Police officer, who picked up the woman after she was interviewed by detectives investigating the death of Deane Fuller-Sandys and drove her to the airport. Thompson said she told him during the drive that she and the other woman had lied to detectives about being present when the alleged murder took place. Tim McKinnel told The New Zealand Herald he believed Thompson's account because it was consistent with other information he has.

=== Concerns about lead detective ===
Franklin was known to use cannabis to cope with stress, and was seen by fellow officers smoking cannabis on the street during the investigation. After he retired, he spent a year in prison in Rarotonga in the Cook Islands for selling it there. The media did not find out about his cannabis use until many years later, long after Maney and Stone had been found guilty.

In overturning the convictions in 2024, the Court of Appeal noted there were "significant questions about the veracity of Detective [Mark] Franklin's assurances in the 1999 trial", and that it harboured "deep misgivings" about his conduct. Journalist Adam Dudding, who made the Gone Fishing podcast, says "There's no question Franklin is at the heart of this story."

=== Stephen Stone's lawyer ===
At his trial in 1999, Stephen Stone was represented by barrister Roger Chambers. In November 2024, Chambers was fined $15,000 by the New Zealand Lawyers and Conveyancers Disciplinary Tribunal and ordered to pay $5,000 to Stone after Chambers was deemed to have breached client confidentiality by publicly declaring in the Gone Fishing podcast that he thought Stone was guilty and calling him a "born thug".

In November 2024, Chambers' son, Richard Chambers, was appointed as the new police commissioner. Under his command, in December 2024, the Crown sought an extension of time until March 2025, so police could carry out further investigations before deciding whether to put Stone back on trial. In April, the Crown solicitor announced that Stone would not be retried.
