= Ministry of Justice (New Zealand) =

Government ministry of New Zealand

- Tāhū o te Ture (Māori)

Ministry overview
- Formed: 1872; 154 years ago
- Jurisdiction: New Zealand Government
- Headquarters: Justice Centre, 19 Aitken St, Wellington, New Zealand
- Employees: More than 4,000
- Ministers responsible: Hon Paul Goldsmith, Minister of Justice, Minister for Treaty of Waitangi Negotiations; Hon Nicole McKee, Minister for Courts, Associate Minister of Justice (Firearms); Hon David Seymour, Associate Minister of Justice (Treaty Principles Bill); Hon Tama Potaka, Minister for Māori Crown Relations: Te Arawhiti; Hon Karen Chhour, Minister for the Prevention of Family and Sexual Violence
- Ministry executive: Andrew Kibblewhite, Secretary for Justice and Chief Executive
- Website: www.justice.govt.nz

The Ministry of Justice (Māori: Te Tāhū o te Ture) is an executive department of the New Zealand Government, responsible for supporting the judiciary and the administration of justice within New Zealand. It develops justice policy and provides advice to ministers, Cabinet, and other justice sector agencies. Its main functions are to help reduce crime and build safer communities; increase trust in the justice system; and maintain the integrity of New Zealand's constitutional arrangements.

The Ministry also administers the court system, the legal aid system and the Public Defence Service; it provides policy advice to the Minister of Justice; assists with the negotiation of Treaty of Waitangi claims; and the running of parliamentary elections.

== Leadership and staff ==
The Ministry of Justice has a six-member Strategic Leadership Team led by Andrew Kibblewhite, Secretary for Justice and Chief Executive. It administers the court system, the legal aid system and the Public Defence Service. The Ministry also provides policy advice to the Minister of Justice, assists with the negotiation of Treaty of Waitangi claims and the running of parliamentary elections. The Ministry employs more than 4,000 staff at over 100 locations around New Zealand.

== Functions ==
=== Policy development ===
The Ministry has a number of policy teams which provide advice to the Government of the day on legal issues and any new legislation which is being proposed. The teams conduct research and evaluate policy relating to civil, criminal, and constitutional law, foreshore and seabed issues and Treaty of Waitangi negotiations. The Ministry also manages input from the public when legislation on justice issues is being considered.

The New Zealand Law Commission also provides advice on legal and justice issues and is part of the justice sector. However, the Law Commission is an independent body whereas the Ministry of Justice is not. The MOJ provides advice to the Minister but ultimately is required to implement and administer whatever policies the government of the day passes into legislation.

==== Key Initiatives ====
The Ministry has a number of key initiatives that it has put forward into Government policy. This includes the Alcohol and Other Drug Treatment Court (AODTC) which reduces reoffending of graduates by 86% and Te Ao Marama, which is a strategy designed to improve access to justice and bring community agencies into court in each locality to assist the judge.

=== Providing Support to the Judiciary ===
The Ministry, uniquely in New Zealand's public sector, is the only agency which works across all three arms of government, aiding the independent judiciary in addition to the executive and legislative branches. This assistance includes aiding the delivery of court services for most of New Zealand's known courts: the Supreme Court, Court of Appeal, High Court, the 58 District Courts, the Coroners Court, Environment Court, Employment Court, and Maori Land Court.

This aid to the independent judiciary includes provision of administrative, technology, and HR support, in addition to training and development. The Ministry also receives input into its operations from the judiciary, such as advice on service design. For initiatives such as ensuring the proper and just use of technology within the judiciary, the Ministry of Justice plays a vital role in supporting the judiciary's efforts. For such initiatives, the judiciary routinely engages in dialogue with the Ministry of Justice as they do with key stakeholder groups.

=== Judicial Conduct Panels ===
As part of its aid to the judiciary, the Ministry operates Judicial Conduct Panels. A Judicial Conduct Panel may be established at the recommendation of the Judicial Conduct Commissioner to the Attorney-General after an initial investigation, after which the Panel's task is to further inquire into the Judge's conduct. The Panel is given the same powers as a Commission of Inquiry.

Two Panel members are Judges or retired Judges (although one can be a senior lawyer) while the third is neither Judge nor lawyer. The Attorney-General then presents the case against the Judge, similar in some ways to a court case – the Judge being complained about can appear at the hearing with lawyer representation, as can others. The Panel hearing can also be held with similar levels of confidentiality to court cases. After the hearing, the Panel reports to the Attorney-General on its fact findings and opinion of whether the Judge's removal is justified.

=== Official Information Act Requests ===
New Zealand's Official Information Act, intended to provide New Zealand citizens with access to information to improve their civic participation and ability to hold government accountable, requires the Ministry to provide any desired official information to citizens on request. This includes specified official information held by the Ministry, reasons for decisions made regarding the petitioner, information about internal policies, and meeting agendas of public bodies. However, court confidentiality policy means that information held by the courts by a case in progress cannot be provided. The Ministry enables requests for information via an online form.

=== Operational services ===
The Ministry's official website states: "The Ministry provides administration, case management and support services to the Supreme Court, Court of Appeal, High Court, District Court, special jurisdictions, and a range of tribunals and authorities in 103 locations around New Zealand". It also provides:

"registry services, claims administration, research services, hearings management, judicial support and report-writing services for the Waitangi Tribunal. The Ministry negotiates for the settlement of historical claims arising from the Treaty of Waitangi, and manages land for use in settlements".

Services provided by the Ministry include the administration of legal aid, the Public Defence Service, information about domestic violence and protection orders, separation and divorce, jury service, enforcing civil debt, and how to access wills and other records. The Ministry also provides advice to the Minister of Justice on miscarriages of justice, including the exercise of the royal prerogative of mercy and compensation for wrongful conviction and imprisonment.

== Justice sector costs ==
The justice sector in New Zealand encompasses various components, including law enforcement, the judiciary, corrections, and associated support services. The sector's financial requirements are significant, reflecting the wide range of operations and responsibilities required to preserve law and order. The justice sector in New Zealand is funded through the national budget, with allocations determined annually. The sector's funding supports several key institutions and functions, including the New Zealand Police, the Ministry of Justice, the Department of Corrections, the judiciary, legal aid, and various support services for victims of crime.

The New Zealand Police is a primary recipient of justice sector funding, covering salaries, equipment, training, operational costs, and community policing. In the 2022/2023 financial year, the police received approximately NZ$2.1 billion to enhance visibility, response times, and crime prevention. The judiciary, comprising various courts including the Supreme Court, Court of Appeal, High Court, and District Courts, is another significant cost centre. Funding for the judiciary ensures that the courts can operate efficiently, with adequate resources for judges, court staff, and case management systems. For the 2022/2023 period, the judiciary received around NZ$600 million.

The Department of Corrections, managing prisons and community-based sentences was allocated about NZ$1.4 billion in the same period. This funding supports prison management, rehabilitation programs, and probation services. Legal aid, essential for providing justice to those who cannot afford representation, received about NZ$180 million, while victim support services were allocated approximately NZ$50 million.

Rising crime rates, especially in domestic violence and cybercrime, along with the need for technological investment, are increasing budget pressures. The future outlook includes reforms like alternative dispute resolution, restorative justice, and technology use in courts to enhance efficiency and reduce costs.

== Current ministers ==
The Ministry serves 5 portfolios and 4 ministers.

Officeholder	Portfolios	Other responsibilities
Hon Paul Goldsmith	Lead Minister (Ministry of Justice); Minister of Justice; Minister for Treaty of Waitangi Negotiations	
Hon Nicole McKee	Minister for Courts	Associate Minister of Justice (Firearms)
Hon Tama Potaka	Minister for Māori-Crown Relations	
Hon Karen Chhour	Minister for the Prevention of Family and Sexual Violence	
Hon David Seymour		Associate Minister of Justice (Treaty Principles Bill)

== See also ==
- Corruption in New Zealand
- Justice ministry
- Law of New Zealand
- Crime in New Zealand
- New Zealand Law Commission
- Legal Aid in New Zealand
