= Teina Pora =

New Zealander wrongfully convicted of murder

Teina Pora (born 1975) is a New Zealand man wrongfully convicted of the murder of Susan Burdett, when he was aged 17; he served 20 years in Paremoremo prison from 1994, until he was paroled in 2014.

In 1992, 39-year-old Burdett was raped and murdered in her home in Papatoetoe, Auckland. She was repeatedly struck in the head with a softball bat. About a year later, Pora who was a Mongrel Mob prospect at the time, was arrested on other charges and, when he learned there was $20,000 reward for information, claimed he was there when the murder happened. He was interviewed for 14 hours without a lawyer present, and was later said to have a mental age of nine or 10 at the time of the crime due to foetal alcohol syndrome. The police and jury were unaware of this, and in 1994, he was convicted of rape and murder.

In 1999, Malcolm Rewa was found guilty of raping Susan Burdett on the night she died. Pora appealed his conviction, but in 2000, was found guilty for the crime a second time. After spending 20 years in prison, Pora was released on parole in April 2014.

However, he continued to maintain his innocence, and the convictions were quashed by the Privy Council in March 2015, notably being the last ruling rendered by the Judicial Committee of the Privy Council with respect to an appeal from the courts of New Zealand. He was awarded NZ$3,509,048 compensation and received a government apology for being wrongfully convicted of rape and murder.

In 2019, Malcolm Rewa was subsequently found guilty of Burdett's murder.

== Early history ==
Teina Pora was born with fetal alcohol spectrum disorder, caused by his mother's drinking during pregnancy. He grew up in Ōtara. His father was never around and his teenage mother died of cancer when he was four.

After his mother's death, Pora lived with grandparents and other family members, including an aunt who tried to raise him as her own son. As a teenager he spent time in boys' homes but often ran away. His brother told TV3's 3rd Degree programme that by the time he was a teenager, Pora was already doing "heaps of crime" but that "he was never a violent person".

== The murder of Susan Burdett ==
Susan Burdett was a 39-year-old accounts clerk who lived alone in Papatoetoe and enjoyed ten pin bowling. On 23 March 1992, she went bowling at the Manukau Superstrike. After she got home, she had a shower and was then raped and battered to death with a softball bat. When she was found, the softball bat, which she kept for her own protection, was found lying on the bed beside her.

=== Background to Pora's involvement ===
Pora and some friends were walking through a park in Manukau a few days after the murder when they found an old softball bat in a drain. It was not the weapon used in the Burdett murder as this was found beside her body at the scene of the crime. Unaware of this, when Pora's aunt found out about the bat in the drain, she suggested to police that Pora may have committed the murder. Police responded by interviewing Pora in April 1992 and again in May 1992. On both occasions he denied any involvement and provided hair and DNA samples to police, which excluded him as a suspect. However, his aunt continued to put forward the view that Pora was involved but the police concluded her information was unreliable.

=== Pora's 'confession' ===
Pora was a prolific car thief and almost a year later, he was arrested for failing to attend court. In the course of a "general conversation" with a police officer, Pora "told him of his troubled life, told the officer he wanted to go straight, that he felt unwanted by his family and that he knew he was being sought by the Mongrel Mob and police". After police told him there was a reward of $20,000 for assistance in capturing Susan Burdett's murderer, Pora claimed he knew who committed the crime. He said he drove two Mongrel Mob members to the house and acted as lookout while they went inside.

Pora did not give the names of the Mongrel Mob members, but when police put two names to him, he went along with these suggestions. Later on, police determined the two Mongrel Mob members both had alibis and their DNA did not match that found in the body. The DNA came from Malcolm Rewa but police did not learn that until four years later.

After claiming he was at the scene, Pora was held for the next four days during which he was questioned about the case for 14 hours without a lawyer. During the course of this drawn out interview, much of which was recorded on video, he frequently changed his story about what happened. After initially claiming he acted as a lookout for the two "Mongrel Mob members", he later said he went into the house after "hearing noises and seeing the crimes being carried out". Still later, he said he held Burdett down by the arms while the others raped her. Pora was subsequently charged with Burdett's rape and murder. In 1995, once Pora was in prison, he provided three more names to police after they offered him another $50,000 and said they would help when he came up for parole.

=== Concerns about the confession ===
According to The New Zealand Herald investigative reporter, Phil Taylor, who wrote extensively about the case, Pora's 'confession' was flawed. He "couldn't find the street Burdett lived in, couldn't point out her house when police stood him in front of it, described Burdett as fair and fat when she was dark and slim, didn't know the (victim's) bed was a waterbed ...couldn't describe the house layout ... didn't know the position her body was left in, [and] said she screamed and yelled when her closest neighbour heard only a series of dull thuds. And those he claimed had raped her were all cleared by DNA."

Gisli Gudjonsson, professor of forensic psychology at the Institute of Psychiatry, King's College, London, was asked to review the nine hours of videotaped interviews and talked with Pora in prison. Gudjonsson is an authority on how people can be induced to make false "confessions". He said Pora's confessions were the result of intellectual impairment and his desire to claim the $20,000 reward – Pora was told there was an "indemnity against prosecution for non-principal offenders". Gudjonsson believed the convictions were "fundamentally flawed and unsafe".

== Trials and hearings ==
=== First trial 1994 ===
No finger prints, DNA, or any other direct evidence linking Pora to the murder scene were produced in court. Nevertheless, despite the contradictory nature of Pora's 'confessions', the Crown successfully argued at his trial that no one would confess to being involved in such a brutal rape and murder if they were not actually involved. His aunt, Terry McLaughlin, was a key Crown witness at the trial. Court documents showed she was paid $5000 to testify against him at the trial. Police have refused Official Information Act requests about payments made to other witnesses against Pora but the NZ Herald reported that a minimum of three witnesses were paid and received a total of $15,000.

=== Conviction of Malcolm Rewa for rape ===
In 1999, Malcolm Rewa was convicted of raping Susan Burdett after semen at the crime scene was found to be his. He was also found guilty of raping numerous other women and currently serves preventive detention for these attacks.

Rewa's offending went on for some years before the police finally brought him to justice. In 2014, TV3's 3rd Degree programme suggested police had overlooked Rewa's involvement in six different sexual assaults. The Independent Police Conduct Authority (IPCA) was then asked to investigate the failure of the police to investigate Rewa's previous rapes including one particular sexual attack which occurred in 1987, five years before he raped Susan Burdett. Police eventually apologised to Malcolm Rewa's victims over the length of time it took to catch him and prevent any further offending.

Rewa was also charged with the murder of Susan Burdett. Detective sergeant David Henwood thought the reason the jury failed to convict Rewa of the murder was that they could not reconcile this possibility with the knowledge that Pora had already been convicted for it. So although Rewa was found guilty for sexually assaulting Ms Burdett on the night she died, the jury at the time was unable to decide whether he was involved in her murder. However, in 2015 Pora's conviction was overturned, and in 2019, Rewa was tried again and found guilty of the murder.

=== Malcolm Rewa's offending profile ===
When prosecuting Rewa, the police argued that Rewa and Pora committed the crime together. The difficulty with this view is that Rewa had a track record as a lone offender – a serial stalker and rapist who was convicted of attacks on 24 other women. Rewa and Pora also came from rival gangs and were significantly different in age; Rewa was 40 and a senior member of the Highway 61 gang while Pora was a 16-year-old Mongrel Mob associate. Evidence put to the Privy Council also suggested that Rewa suffered from erectile dysfunction and would have been unlikely to have had an accomplice because of his embarrassment about this.

Professor Laurence Alison, chair of forensic psychology at Liverpool University, concluded that it is "highly unlikely" Malcolm Rewa would have worked with any co-offender, let alone with Pora. He said: "These conclusions would have been much harder to arrive at at the time of Teina Pora's appeal since far less was known about behavioural profiling and specific co-offending patterns in rape."

=== Pora's second trial 2000 ===
Pora appealed his conviction after the semen in Ms Burdett's body was found to belong to Malcolm Rewa. The Court of Appeal ordered a retrial and in 2000, Pora was found guilty a second time. Pora then applied for the royal prerogative of mercy, under which the Governor-General can order a new trial. In May 2013, his legal team prepared an appeal to the Privy Council to have his convictions quashed which put his application for mercy on hold.

== Police concerns about Pora's conviction ==
Two police officers expressed concerns that Pora was wrongly convicted. Detective Sergeant Dave Henwood, a criminal profiler, believed Rewa raped and murdered Mrs Burdett and acted alone, based on his knowledge of Rewa's criminal signature. In 2012 a second senior officer, who also worked on the case, wrote to Police Commissioner Peter Marshall expressing his concern that the wrong man had been convicted. Susan's brother, Jim Burdett, also believed that Rewa was the one who raped and killed his sister. He believed Susan stood up for herself, that Rewa took the bat off her that she kept for self-defence and "struck the blows that killed her".

=== Calls for inquiry ===
In 2013, the Police Association officially called for a review of Pora's conviction, citing "sufficient concern among some senior detectives to warrant an inquiry".

The Māori Party also backed an inquiry in the case. A documentary about his case titled The Confessions of Prisoner T was aired on Māori Television on 5 May 2013. It featured defence lawyer, Marie Dyhrberg, who said that out of all the criminals she has ever been involved with, she believed in Pora's innocence more than any other.

In response to the documentary, the Green Party also called for a review. Green Party spokesman David Clendon wrote to Police Commissioner Peter Marshall asking him to reopen the case. He said "serious misconduct by police was rare in New Zealand", but "it was important to maintain the public's faith in the justice system by holding a review".

== Parole hearings ==
Over his 20 years in prison, Pora made numerous appearances before the parole board. At those hearings he repeatedly denied he had any part in Burdett's murder, which made it difficult for the board to grant him parole. His 12th attempt to be released on parole was declined in October 2013 after he admitted visiting a prostitute with a former inmate while on temporary leave. He was finally released in April 2014. At a monitoring hearing five months later, the board noted he was doing well but added: "Given his lengthy time in prison, and limited education before (being) imprisoned, (reintegration) will be a difficult and necessarily slow process of which he is aware."

== Privy Council hearing 2014 ==
On 31 January 2014 the Judicial Committee announced that Pora had been granted permission to take his case to the Privy Council in London later in 2014. The hearing was held in November. Pora's lawyer Jonathan Krebs told the Privy Council his client had recently been diagnosed with foetal alcohol spectrum disorder and had a mental age of nine or 10 at the time of the crime. He said this disability meant Pora was easily confused, had a drive to please others, and that his confession in 1993 should therefore be seen as unreliable.

Questions were also asked about the people named by Pora as having committed the murder. One of the Privy Council judges, Lord Toulson asked New Zealand's Solicitor-General "Why didn't Pora name [Malcolm] Rewa?" The explanation given by Pora's lawyers was that "Pora couldn't name Rewa because Pora didn't know him and because Pora wasn't there". The Privy Council quashed Pora's convictions on 3 March 2015.

== Compensation and apology ==
On 15 June 2016, Teina Pora was awarded NZ$2.52 million compensation and received a government apology for being wrongfully convicted of rape and murder. Retired High Court judge Rodney Hansen, QC, who was appointed by the government to review the case after the Privy Council quashed Pora's convictions, said he could have found Pora innocent on a higher standard than the balance of probabilities.

In July 2017, Pora appealed the amount awarded, submitting that it had been calculated on 1998 guidelines that awarded $100,000 per year, and had not been adjusted for inflation as recommended by Judge Hansen. The court upheld the appeal in August 2017.

In September 2017, the general election resulted in a change of government, and incoming Justice Minister Andrew Little announced that the outgoing government's intention to appeal the decision would not go ahead and Pora's compensation would be increased to match inflation. A few days later Little announced Pora would receive an extra $988,099 bringing his total compensation to $3,509,048.

== Impact on justice system ==
This case has been one of a number of high profile miscarriages of justice in New Zealand in recent years. It was a factor in the Labour Government's decision to establish a Criminal Cases Review Commission in 2020.

== Source documents ==
- PORA – Teina – 08/04/2013 Parole Board decision
- PORA – Teina – 02/02/2011 Parole Board decision
