= Wellington Rape Crisis =

Support center for sexual crime victims

Wellington Rape Crisis is a support centre for survivors of rape and sexual abuse, their families and friends. It was founded in 1977 as part of a wave of foundations across New Zealand in the early to mid 1970s. Their work includes advocacy, education for public and counselling for survivors. In 2008 Wellington Rape Crisis received charitable status from the Charities Commission.

== Advocacy ==
Wellington Rape Crisis advocates against sexual violence and rape culture.

In 2012, pizza company Hell Pizza faced controversy when they ran a "Confessional" competition on Facebook. The winner described an incident of sexual assault where he put his penis inside the mouth of a drunk person who was passed out. This was met with a huge number of complaints and criticisms across Facebook and Twitter. Hell Pizza blamed a social media manager and removed the post. However they subsequently donated $10,000 to Wellington Rape Crisis and matched donations made to the agency that month dollar for dollar. At the time Wellington Rape Crisis were being forced to cut services, closing their doors on Fridays due to a $55,000.00 funding shortfall. Wellington Rape Crisis experienced an increase in client numbers and were faced with a difficult funding environment. The funding was accepted by the agency on the condition that Hell Pizza's executives, staff and managers do sexual violence awareness and bystander intervention training provided by the Sexual Abuse Prevention Network.

News of the Roast Busters scandal first broke in November 2013. A group of young men based in Auckland allegedly intoxicated underage girls to gang rape them. The lack of police response to the issue and the line of questioning they took when interviewing the complainants sparked a large public outcry. Wellington Rape Crisis condemned the behavior of the young boys as abhorrent and denounced the rape culture in New Zealand. Agency Manager Natalie Gousmett said:

This whole situation is horrific. First we have the abhorrent behavior of the members of the rape group, causing serious harm to the victims they have targeted. Then we have appalling coverage by media, including extreme victim-blaming and today we have heard the Police have indeed had complaints yet have only just started taking action now.

In November 2015 New Zealand Prime Minister John Key accused the opposition party of “Backing rapists.” In response to these claims several female MPs stood up and shared their own experiences of sexual violence and voiced their offence to the Prime Minister's comments. They were subsequently thrown out of Parliament by the Speaker of the House. Spokesperson for Wellington Rape Crisis Eleanor Butterworth said the Prime Minister's comments were not helpful. She said “It was not only harmful for survivors to have rape used as a political football, but also for the families of people who have been sexually abused.

== Awards ==
- 2013 Wellington Rape Crisis received The Dominion Post Choice Charities Award. The winners were chosen by the public. The award included a $10,000 prize comprising $5000 cash and $5000 worth of advertising.

== See also ==
- Violence against women in New Zealand
- Sexual Abuse Prevention Network
- Initiatives to prevent sexual violence
