= SAPN =

SAPN may stand for:

- SA Power Networks, Australian electric utility
- Sexual Abuse Prevention Network, New Zealand organisation
- Société des Autoroutes de Paris Normandie, French company
