= Domestic violence in New Zealand =

Domestic violence in New Zealand, often called family violence or family harm is defined under New Zealand law as not only intimate partner violence but also violence against other family members, including children and extended family or whānau, as well as people living together in the same household, such as flatmates. It is estimated that one third of people in New Zealand have experienced intimate partner violence (IPV) within their lifetime, making New Zealand have the highest rate of domestic violence in 14 OECD countries. In 2020, New Zealand police responded to a domestic violence call every 4 minutes.

The New Zealand Family Violence Clearinghouse was launched in 2005 and is operated by the University of Auckland, under a contract funded by Te Puna Aonui. (nzfvc.org.nz). Data collected and reviewed by NZFVC has found that in 2016, 89% of people in New Zealand who sought a protection order were women. Men made up 89% of the respondents to protection orders.

The Family Violence Death Review Committee found that in the period 2009–2018, 88 New Zealand women were murdered by their partners. Of the women who were killed, 51% had left their abusive partner within the last three months. A further 14% of women who were killed had left their partner more than three months before they were murdered. This indicates that separation does not equal safety.

The New Zealand Family Violence Death Review Committee notes that where a woman had killed her partner, the violence often had “strong defensive features”.

Research shows that strangulation, substance abuse, gun ownership, extreme jealousy, forced sex, isolation from friends and family, having a child from a different biological parent in the home, threats to kill, threats of suicide, threats during pregnancy, and stalking are all high-risk factors for being murdered by a partner. The risk is highest in the three months after a woman leaves and doesn’t drop significantly until 12 months have passed.

The Ministry of Health has suggested that Māori women and children often use health and community services later than others, meaning that when they do their injuries and issues are more serious.

== Prevalence ==
The Dunedin Multidisciplinary Health and Development Study reported that 34% of men and 27% of women have experienced physical abuse by their partner. 37% of women and 22% of men reported that they had perpetrated the violence. According to the Ministry of Justice, 23% of females and 10% of males who have had a partner have experienced intimate partner violence in their lifetime.

New Zealand is ranked as having the highest prevalence of domestic violence in 14 OECD countries that participated in a survey.

=== Sexual violence ===
A survey conducted by the Ministry of Justice found that 94% of sexual assaults were not reported to police, and that 2% of victims experienced 33% of all offences.

In 2021, the Ministry of Justice reported that in the past 12 months, approximately 2% of adults experienced sexual assault ranging between threats of unwanted touching to forced sexual intercourse. This number was 11% for sexual minorities. 9% of females aged 15-19 had experienced sexual assault, and 7% of females aged 20-29 had also.

=== Māori ===
Māori are over represented as both the victims and perpetrators of family violence in New Zealand. With Māori women being at a three times higher risk of IPV than other women. Just over half of Child, Youth and Family clients whom have at least one substantiated abuse finding are Māori. Of this total number, 4451 were boys and 4490 were girls.

Between 2011 and 2012, Māori women were the most common gender and ethnic group to be admitted to hospital following assault by a family member. More than half of the total were Māori. Of these cases, about 19% of the perpetrators were identified as ‘other' family members, with spouse/domestic partners being the most common perpetrators.

== Contributing factors ==
Domestic violence in New Zealand is more likely to occur when alcohol is involved, being financially reliant on a partner, social and economic disadvantage regarding education, employment, health, housing and income, in young families, and beneficiaries in sole parent households. Currently Māori make up for almost a third of the total proportion of beneficiaries in New Zealand.

The New Zealand Department of Corrections has recognised that whānau violence perpetrators have a range of individual problems such as anger, hostility and personality disorders from having witnessed or suffered abuse as children.

=== Māori ===
Hardship experienced by Māori is seen as a key factor, which includes low educational achievement, low income and restricted employment opportunities.

In a study of a group of Māori women who have experienced whānau violence, they identified financial dependence on other family members — particularly their partners — as a key contributing factor for violence. They identified the link beginning at education through to employment opportunities and adequate income with freedom of choice, independence, safety and equal power and control.

== Law ==
=== Domestic violence ===
The Domestic Violence Act 1995 was enacted to ensure the legal protection for victims of any physical, sexual, and psychological domestic violence. Through the Family Court, it provides a civil procedure for obtaining a 'protection order' requiring perpetrators of domestic violence to desist, and attend "stopping violence" programmes for the prevention of family violence. The New Zealand Police can also issue immediately effective 'Police Safety Orders' requiring the person issued with the order to leave the address of the victim for up to five days. Criminal courts may also issue protection orders during sentencing for a domestic violence offence.

In 2013 the New Zealand government made changes to the Domestic Violence Act 1995, such as increasing maximum penalty for breaching a protection order, and discussed taking a "long-term approach" to ending family violence through promoting changes in attitude and behaviours.

=== Sexual offences ===
Sexual offences are defined in the Crimes Act 1961. The crime of rape or unlawful sexual connection requires that the accused did not have the person's consent and did not believe on reasonable grounds that the person was consenting.

In 2008 the Ministry of Justice released a discussion documenting calling for submissions on the inclusion of ‘positive consent’, the inclusion of broader investigation into the surrounding circumstances in determining whether the accused had reasonable grounds for consent, and the extension of the ‘rape shield’ to limit a defendant's ability to question a complainant about their past sexual behaviour. Furthermore, the question was raised over the models and practices of the current justice system in dealing with sexual violence.

In 2009 the Taskforce for Action on Sexual Violence produced a report including recommendations on preventing sexual violence, creating specialist front-line services for victims and offenders, reforming criminal justice, and approaches to end sexual violence. The report recommended the completion of a Sexual Violence Prevention Plan, a review of funding for crisis support services, legislative changes to the Accident Compensation Corporation scheme, legislative amendments to the Crimes Act 1961, and an exploration of alternative justice in cases of sexual offences. The New Zealand government responded to the report in September 2010, however it was noted by the Committee on the Elimination of Discrimination against Women in 2012 that many of the recommendations in the report have yet to be implemented.

== Māori ==
Community organisations such as the New Zealand Women's Refuge have attempted to make their services more accessible to Māori women and children experiencing whānau violence by providing culturally appropriate services. Of the 45 local refuges around New Zealand, 14 ‘whare’ (houses) have been specifically designed by Māori for wahine (Māori women) and their tamariki (children) and whānau. The whare aim to eliminate violence whilst promoting Māori values such as the wellbeing of whānau, promoting mana (strength), transformation and creating support within the wider community.

Figures from 2011 and 2012 support the introduction of these specialised refuges for Māori women as half of the total number of women who used Women's Refuge services were identified as Māori.

== Prevention ==
Current prevention techniques include providing education, information and support services to implement changes in attitude and behaviour for not only the victims and perpetrators of whānau violence but also for the whānau and wider community. The focus on the wider community is of particular importance as it focuses on the large scale of whānau violence and aims to shift attitudes and norms within the Māori culture.

A prevention technique is the Mauri Ora framework which incorporates Māori principles and values such as whakapapa, tikanga, wairua (spirit), tapu (forbidden/sacred values), mauri (the essence of emotions), and mana (power). These cultural constructs help to give priority to Māori culture, knowledge and identity when addressing the issue of whānau violence. They also help non-Māori to understand the different approach required on the path to eliminating whānau violence. The framework aims to apply the principles in practice when facing contemporary issues of today such as colonisation. This is a fairly new approach focussing on the preservation of Māori values within the environmental and contextual influences of modern New Zealand.

The Ministry for Women acknowledge that when dealing with violence there are three stages of prevention, namely, primary (before violence occurs, with a focus on large groups) and secondary and tertiary (after violence occurs, with a targeted focus on victims and offenders). The Ministry has noted that previously most primary prevention approaches for violence against women specifically targeted women but has recently begun to include men and boys.

Current prevention techniques include providing education, information and support services to implement changes in attitude and behaviour for not only the victims and perpetrators of domestic violence, but also for the wider community.

=== Māori ===
Another culturally sensitive prevention technique is the Mauri Ora framework which incorporates Māori principles and values such as whakapapa (genealogy), tikanga (general behaviour guidelines for daily life and interaction within the Māori culture), wairua (spirit), tapu (forbidden/sacred values), mauri (the essence of emotions), and mana (power). These cultural constructs help to give priority to Māori culture, knowledge and identity when addressing the issue of whānau violence. They also help non-Māori to understand the different approach required on the path to eliminating whānau violence. The framework aims to apply the principles in practice when facing contemporary issues of today such as colonisation. This is a fairly new approach focussing on the preservation of Māori values within the environmental and contextual influences of modern New Zealand.

== Response ==
In 2018, New Zealand Police introduced a different way of responding to what they called family harm which sought to intervene at the earliest opportunity, rather than repeatedly responding to incidents between the same two parties that got progressively worse.

New legislation by the NZ government alongside advocacy groups such as the White Ribbon Campaign seek to reduce the occurrence of Domestic violence in New Zealand.

The New Zealand Family Violence Clearinghouse provides an online catalogue and depository for resources, statistics, and publications on family violence in New Zealand.

=== Media ===
In recent years the government has established the It's not OK! campaign to raise awareness amongst New Zealanders. The campaign advocates that family violence should be a concern to everybody and encourages both victims and perpetrators to seek help. According to research, one in three people report taking some form of action to prevent family violence as a result of the Campaign.

Domestic violence against men gets media less attention than violence against women or children. Pasifika victims are also underrepresented.

== Research ==
- Family Violence Clearing House

== Legislation ==
- "Domestic Violence Act, 1995". New Zealand Law online. 1995.
- "Family Violence Act, 2018 (2019 reprint)". New Zealand Law online. 2019.

== See also ==
- Domestic violence against men
- Violence against women in New Zealand
