= Anthony Ray Parker =

American actor

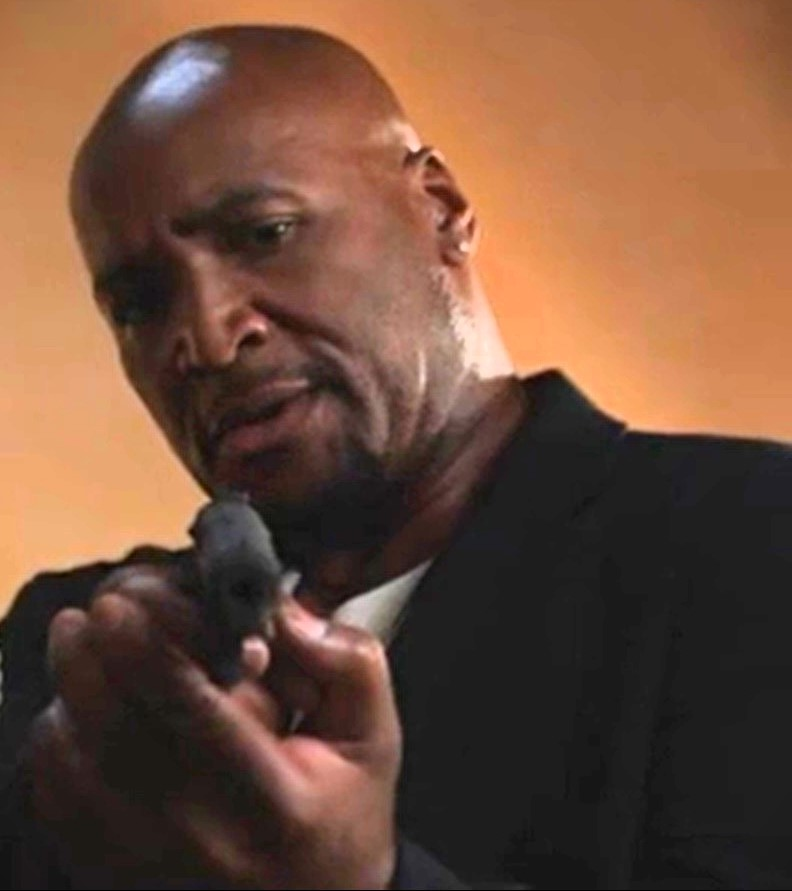
- Parker in The Love Affair, 2010 short film
- Born: Saginaw, Michigan, U.S.
- Other names: Antony Rarker; A. R. Parker
- Children: 3

Anthony Ray Parker is an American actor.

== Early life ==
Parker was born in Saginaw, Michigan, United States.

== Career ==
For years during the late 1990s and early 2000s, Parker settled in Auckland, New Zealand, and had a prominent career on television in various shows as Suzanne Paul's sidekick. He appeared in the film The Matrix as the character Dozer. In 2006, Parker starred in John Cena's film The Marine. He also appeared in the horror film Dead Air.

Parker has filmed a number of television shows and movies in Australia and New Zealand, including Hercules in the Maze of the Minotaur where he performed Hercules' half-brother Gryphus who was turned into a Minotaur by his father Zeus for trying to turn humanity away from the Gods. Al Chalk was the one who voiced Gryphus. Parker would later perform a different Minotaur in the Hercules: The Legendary Journeys episode "The Sword of Verocity" where it was created by Hera. Parker has also done voice work as different monsters in Power Rangers Dino Thunder and Power Rangers Megaforce

In 2007, he performed the role of Buddy McDeere, the Head coach of the Russian boxer, Anton Kolchin in the Russian movie Shadowboxing 2: Revenge.

Parker has appeared in the Starz production of Spartacus: War of the Damned in the role of a rebel slave named Sanus in 2013.

== Personal life ==
Anthony Ray Parker has a daughter and two sons. His son Joseph Lavell Parker received widespread media attention after alleged involvement in gang rapes in the Roast Busters scandal.

He has advertised for a browser application called RealStew. He owned Club Physical, a short lived cafe in New Zealand.

Parker has advocated for suicide prevention.

Parker currently resides in Los Angeles, California.

== Filmography ==
=== Film ===
Year	Title	Role	Notes
1996	The Frighteners	Deputy	
1999	The Matrix	Dozer	
1999	Nightmare Man	Webster	
2005	Harmony Parker	John	Short film
2005	Way of the Game	Jack Payne	Short film
2006	The Marine	Morgan	
2007	T.K.O.	Slim	
2007	Unlicensed	Marcus Moore	Short film
2007	Shadowboxing 2: Revenge	Buddy McDeere	
2008	The Mourner	Ruben Dutch	Short film

=== Television ===
Year	Title	Role	Notes
1994	Hercules in the Maze of the Minotaur	Minotaur/Gryphus	Television film
1995–1996	Hercules: The Legendary Journeys	Ipicles, Minotaur, and Valerus	3 episodes
1996	One West Waikiki	Kim's bodyguard	Episode: "The Romanoff Affair"
1996–2000	Xena: Warrior Princess	Bacchus, Deliverer, Mephistopheles, and Pinullus	4 episodes
1996	Every Woman's Dream	Security guard	Television film
1998	Shortland Street	Chip Dexter	
1998–2001	Guess Who's Coming to Dinner?	Host	
1998	Garage Sale	Himself	
2002	Superfire	Fire Captain	Television film
2003	Eddie's Million Dollar Cook-Off	Umpire	Television film
2004	Power Rangers Dino Thunder	Thornox (voice)	Episode: "Disappearing Act"
2006	Prison Break: Proof of Innocence	Beefy Con	Episode: "Proof"
2013	Power Rangers Megaforce	Scaraba (voice)	Episode: "Mega Mission"
2019	Euphoria	Allan	Episode: "Shook Ones Pt. II"
