= Sexual Abuse Prevention Network =

New Zealand NGO

Sexual Abuse Prevention Network (SAPN) is a New Zealand non-governmental organisation that works in primary prevention of sexual abuse. The organisation focuses its prevention efforts on education and is also involved in awareness raising activities. The organisation is governed by Wellington Rape Crisis, Wellington Sexual Abuse HELP Foundation and WellStop.

== History ==
The Sexual Abuse Prevention Network began as informal meetings between Wellington Rape Crisis, Wellington Sexual Abuse HELP Foundation and WellStop in the early 2000s. The collaboration was formalised as Wellington Sexual Abuse Network in 2011 and in 2013 the Network relaunched with the name, Sexual Abuse Prevention Network. In 2019 it relaunched as "RespectEd Aotearoa".

== Projects ==
Sexual Abuse Prevention Network is part of the Who are You? Steering Committee that manages the use and distribution of the Who are You? film and toolkit. The organisation runs a program for people working in the hospitality sector, including bar staff and security staff, to train them to identify situations that may lead to sexual violence and how to intervene. The tools to do so have been drawn from the social psychology research into the phenomenon of the bystander effect. In 2015, Sexual Abuse Prevention Network presented on this topic at the NGO side events at the 59th UN Commission on the Status of Women.

== Advocacy ==
Sexual Abuse Prevention Network regularly speaks out on a range of issues relating to sexual abuse and rape culture, particularly on emerging issues of technology-facilitated sexual violence. This has included the Roast Busters Scandal, the sharing of nude images without consent and dating apps such as Tinder and Grindr.

== See also ==
- Violence against women in New Zealand
- Initiatives to prevent sexual violence
