= Initiatives to prevent sexual violence =

Responses aimed at combating sexual violence

Sexual Violence and Victimization
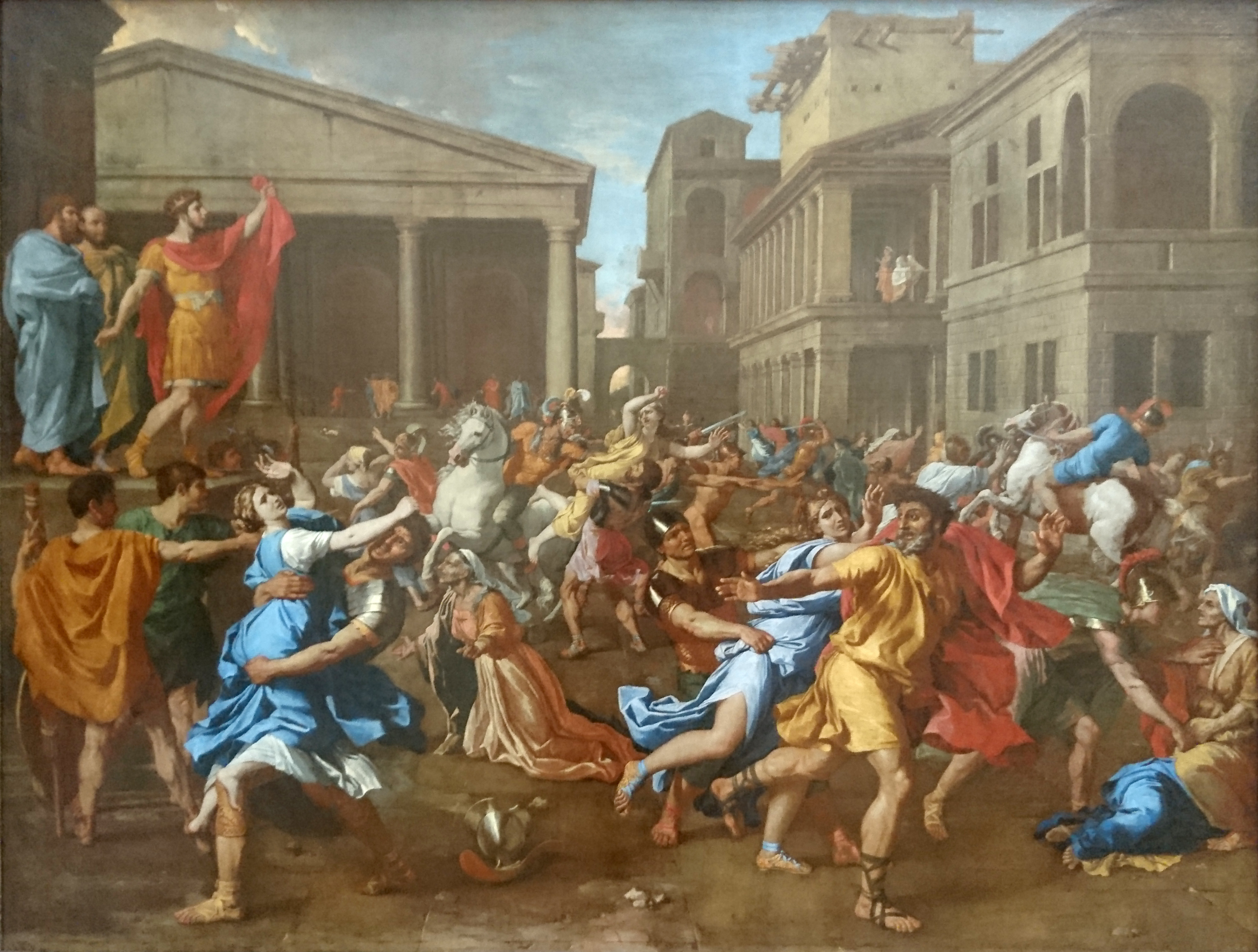

Specific Offenses
- Rape · Statutory Rape · Incest
- Sexual Assault · Domestic violence
- Sexual Abuse · Child sexual abuse
- Sexual Harassment · Pimping
- Attempted rape · Genital mutilation
- Deviant sexual intercourse

Forms of Violence and Victimization
- Types of rape · War rape · Sexual slavery
- Spousal Rape · Prison rape
- Date rape · Date rape drug
- Human trafficking · Prostitution

Victimization of Children
- Child pornography · Child trafficking
- Prostitution of children
- Commercial exploitation

Sociological Theories
- Sociobiological theories of rape
- Motivation for rape · Victim blaming
- Misogyny · Misandry · Aggression
- Pedophilia · Effects and aftermath
- Rape Trauma Syndrome

Social and Cultural Aspects
- Rape culture · History of rape
- raptio · Comfort women ·

Policy
- Laws about rape · Rape shield law
- Laws regarding child sexual abuse
- Rape crisis center · Honor killing
- Anti-rape female condom · Rape statistics

Portals: Law

As sexual violence affects all parts of society, the responses that arise to combat it are comprehensive, taking place on the individual, administrative, legal, and social levels.

== Individual approaches ==
=== Programmes for perpetrators ===
There are few programmes outside of the criminal justice system which are targeting perpetrators of sexual violence, generally aimed at men convicted of male-on-female sexual assault, who form a significant portion of criminal cases of sexual violence. A common response of men who commit sexual violence is to deny both that they are responsible and that what they are doing is violent. These programs, found mainly in Industrialized nations, work with male perpetrators to make them admit responsibility and be publicly seen as responsible for their actions. One way of achieving this is for programmes that target male perpetrators of sexual violence to collaborate with support services for victims, which would potentially be a revictimization of rape victims and be a poor choice of action unless the rape perpetrator is highly contrite and apologetic, as well as with campaigns against sexual violence.

==== Life-skills and other educational programmes ====
In recent years, several programmes for sexual and reproductive health promotion, particularly those promoting HIV prevention, have begun to introduce gender issues and to address the problem of sexual and physical violence. Two notable examples developed for Africa but used in many parts of the developing world include "Stepping Stones" and "Men As Partners". These programmes have been designed for use in peer groups of men and women and are delivered over several workshop sessions using participatory learning approaches. Their comprehensive approach helps men, who might otherwise be reluctant to attend programmes solely concerned with violence against women, participate and discuss a range of issues concerning violence. Furthermore, even if men are sometimes the perpetrators of sexual violence, the programmes are careful to avoid labelling them as such.

A review of the effect of the Stepping Stones programme in Africa and Asia found that the workshops helped the men participating take greater responsibility for their actions, relate better to others, have greater respect for women and communicate more effectively. As a result of the programme, reductions in violence against women have been reported in communities in Cambodia, the Gambia, South Africa, Uganda, Fiji, the United Republic of Tanzania and elsewhere. The evaluations to date, though, have generally used qualitative methods and further research is needed to adequately test the effectiveness of this programme.

=== Developmental approaches ===
Research has stressed the importance of encouraging nurturing, with better and more gender balanced parenting, to prevent sexual violence. At the same time, Schwartz has developed a prevention model that adopts a developmental approach, with interventions before birth, during childhood and in adolescence and young adulthood. In this model, the prenatal element would include discussions of parenting skills, the stereotyping of gender roles, stress, conflict and violence. In the early years of childhood, health providers would pursue these issues and introduce child sexual abuse and exposure to violence in the media to the list of discussion topics, as well as promoting the use of non-sexist educational materials. In later childhood, health promotion would include modelling behaviours and attitudes that avoid stereotyping, encouraging children to distinguish between good and bad touching, and enhancing their ability and confidence to take control over their own bodies. This intervention would allow room for talking about sexual aggression. During adolescence and young adulthood, discussions would cover myths about rape, how to set boundaries for sexual activity, and breaking the links between sex, violence and coercion. While Schwartz's model was designed for use in industrialized countries, some of the principles involved could be applicable to developing countries.

== Health care responses ==
=== Medico-legal services ===
In many countries, when sexual violence is reported, the health sector has the duty to collect medical and legal evidence to corroborate the accounts of the victims or to help in identifying the perpetrator. Research in Canada suggests that medico-legal documentation can increase the chance of a perpetrator being arrested, charged, or convicted. For instance, one study found that documented physical injury, particularly of the moderate to severe type, was associated with charges being filed, irrespective of the patient's income level or whether the patient knew the assailant, either as an acquaintance or an intimate partner. However, a study of women attending a hospital in Nairobi, Kenya, following rape, has highlighted the fact that in many countries rape victims are not examined by a gynaecologist or an experienced police examiner and that no standard protocols or guidelines exist on this matter.

The use of standard protocols and guidelines can significantly improve the quality of treatment and psychological support of victims, as well as the evidence that is collected. Comprehensive protocols and guidelines for female victims of assault should include:

- recording a full description of the incident, listing all the assembled evidence;
- listing the gynecological and contraceptive history of the victim;
- documenting in a standard way the results of a full physical examination;
- assessment of the risk of pregnancy;
- testing for and treating sexually transmitted diseases, including, where appropriate, testing for HIV;
- providing emergency contraception and, where legal, counseling on abortion;
- providing psychological support and referral.

In some countries, the protocol forms part of the procedure of a sexual assault evidence kit that includes instructions and containers for collecting evidence, appropriate legal forms and documents for recording histories. Examinations of rape victims are by their nature extremely stressful. The use of a video to explain the procedure before an examination has been shown significantly to reduce the stress involved.

=== Training for health care professionals ===
Issues concerning sexual violence need to be addressed in the training of all health service staff, including psychiatrists and counsellors, in basic training as well as in specialized postgraduate courses. Such training should, in the first place, give health care workers greater knowledge and awareness of sexual violence and make them more able to detect and handle cases of abuse in a sensitive but effective way. It should also help reduce instances of sexual abuse within the health sector, something that can be a significant, though generally unacknowledged, problem.

In the Philippines, the Task Force on Social Science and Reproductive Health, a body that includes doctors, nurses and social scientists and is supported by the Department of Health, has produced training modules for nursing and medical students on gender-based violence. The aims of this programme are:

- to understand the roots of violence in the context of culture, gender and other social aspects;
- to identify situations, within families or homes that are at a high risk for violence, where it would be appropriate to undertake;
- primary interventions, in particular in collaboration with other professionals;
- secondary interventions, including identifying victims of violence, understanding basic legal procedures and how to present evidence, referring and following up patients, and helping victims reintegrate into society.

These training modules are built into the curricula for both nursing and medical students. For the nursing curriculum, the eleven modules are spread over the four years of formal instruction, and for medical students over their final three years of practical training.

=== Prophylaxis for HIV infection ===
The possibility of transmission of HIV during rape is a major cause for concern, especially in countries with a high prevalence of HIV infection. The use of antiretroviral drugs following exposure to HIV is known in certain contexts to be reasonably effective. For instance, the administration of the antiretroviral drug zidovudine (AZT) to health workers following an occupational needle-stick exposure (puncturing the skin with a contaminated needle) has been shown to reduce the subsequent risk of developing HIV infection by 81%. The average risk of HIV infection from a single act of unprotected vaginal sex with an infected partner is relatively low (approximately 1.2 per 1000, from male to female, and around 0.5–1 per 1000 from female to male). This risk, in fact, is of a similar order to that from a needle-stick injury (around 3 per 1000), for which post exposure prophylaxis is now routine treatment. The average risk of HIV infection from unprotected anal sex is considerably higher, though, at around 5.30 per 1000. However, during rape, because of the force used, it is very much more likely that there will be macroscopic or microscopic tears to the vaginal mucosa, something that will greatly increase the probability of HIV transmission. There is no information about the feasibility or cost-effectiveness in resource-poor settings of routinely offering rape victims prophylaxis for HIV.

Testing for HIV infection after rape is difficult in any case. In the immediate aftermath of an incident, many victims are not in a position fully to comprehend complicated information about HIV testing and risks. Ensuring proper follow-up is also difficult as many victims will not attend further scheduled visits for reasons that probably relate to their psychological coping following the assault.

The side-effects of antiretroviral treatment may also be significant, causing people to drop out from a course, though those who perceive themselves as being at high risk are much more likely to be compliant.

Despite the lack of knowledge about the effectiveness of HIV prophylaxis following rape, many organizations have recommended its use. For instance, medical aid schemes in high-income countries are increasingly including it in their care packages. Research is urgently needed in middleincome and low-income countries on the effectiveness of antiretroviral treatment after rape and how it could be included in patient care.

=== Centres providing comprehensive care to victims of sexual assault ===
Because of the shortage of doctors in many countries, specially trained nurses have been used in some places to assist victims of sexual assault. In Canada, nurses, known as sexual assault nurse examiners, are trained to provide comprehensive care to victims of sexual violence. These nurses refer clients to a physician when medical intervention is needed. In the province of Ontario, Canada, the first sexual assault care centre opened in 1984 and since then 26 others have been established. These centres provide or coordinate a wide range of services, including emergency medical care and medical follow-up, counseling, collecting forensic evidence of assault, legal support, and community consultation and education.

In South Africa, where the rate of sexual violence is among the highest in the world, Thuthuzela Care Centres (TCCs) employ a trans-disciplinary approach to dealing with the aftermath of an assault. They provide forensic as well as medical services to victims in the 72 hours following a rape. TCCs are credited with helping to reduce trial completion time for cases from two years to just over seven months, and for producing conviction rates of 84–89%. The TCC model has been held by the UN as a "best practice model" as a sexual violence support centre.

Centres that provide a range of services for victims of sexual assault, often located in places such as a hospital or police station, are being developed in many countries. For example, the One-Stop Crisis Centre is a unit in the Kuala Lumpur Hospital that provides coordinated inter-agency response to violence against women. Specialized centres such as these have the advantage of providing appropriately-trained and experienced staff. In some places, on the other hand, integrated centres exist providing services for victims of different forms of violence.

== Community-based efforts ==
=== Prevention programs ===
Several research based rape prevention programs have been tested and verified through scientific studies.

The Men's Program, also known as the One in Four program, by John Foubert focuses on empathy toward rape survivors and intervention of sexual assault situations. Men who participated in program committed 40 percent fewer acts of sexually coercive behavior and any sexual coercion committed was eight times less severe than a control group. Participants reported more success with intervention and a greater willingness to help as a bystander.

Bring in the Bystander by Victoria Banyard focuses on bystanders. The program includes a brief empathy induction component and a pledge to intervene in the future. Participants showed increased bystander efficacy, increased willingness to intervene as a bystander, and decreased rape myth acceptance.

MVP: Mentors in Violence Prevention by Jackson Katz also focuses on bystanders by encouraging men to be active bystanders. The program instructs participants through hypothetical scenarios. Outcomes reported in research literature include lower levels of sexism and increased belief that participants could prevent violence against women.

The Green Dot program by Dorothy Edwards also focuses on bystanders and instructs using both motivational speeches and peer education. Program participation is associated with reductions in rape myth acceptance and increased bystander intervention.

=== Community activism by men ===
Men's groups against domestic violence against women by men and rape of women by men can be found in Australia, Africa, Latin America and the Caribbean and Asia, and in many parts of North America and Europe. The underlying theory for this type of initiative is that men must as individuals take measures to reduce their use of violence. Typical activities include group discussions, education campaigns and rallies, work with violent men, and workshops in schools, prisons and workplaces. Actions are frequently conducted in collaboration with women's organizations that are involved in preventing violence against women and providing services to abused women.

In the United States alone, there are over 100 such men's groups, many of which focus specifically on sexual violence. The Men Can Stop Rape group in Washington, DC, for instance, views masculinity as inherently violent and sexist and seeks to promote alternative forms of masculinity that foster non-violence and gender equality. Its recent activities have included conducting presentations in secondary schools, designing posters, producing a handbook for teachers and publishing a youth magazine. Other groups, such as One in Four, focus on applying research based programs to sexual assault prevention on college campuses and in the military.

=== Legal and policy responses ===
==== Reporting and handling cases of sexual violence ====
Many countries have a system to encourage people to report incidents of sexual violence to the police and to improve the speed and sensitivity of the processing of cases by the courts. The specific mechanisms include dedicated domestic violence units, sexual crime units, gender training for the police and court officials, women-only police stations and courts for rape offences.

Problems are sometimes created by the unwillingness of medical experts to attend court. The reason for this is frequently that the court schedules are unpredictable, with cases often postponed at short notice and long waits for witnesses who are to give short testimonies. In South Africa, to counter this, the Directorate of Public Prosecutions has been training magistrates to interrupt proceedings in sexual violence cases when the medical expert arrives so that testimonies can be taken and witnesses cross-examined without delay.

=== Legal reform ===
Legal interventions that have been adopted in many places have included:

- broadening the definition of rape;
- reforming the rules on sentencing and on admissibility of evidence;
- removing the requirements for victim's accounts to be corroborated.

In 1983, the Canadian laws on rape were reformed, in particular removing the requirement that accounts of rape be corroborated. Nonetheless, an evaluation has found that the prosecutors have tended to ignore this easing of the requirement for corroboration and that few cases go to court without forensic evidence.

Several countries in Asia, including the Philippines, have recently enacted legislation radically redefining rape and mandating state assistance to victims. The result has been a substantial increase in the number of reported cases. Campaigns to inform the general public of their legal rights must also take place if the reformed legislation is to be fully effective.

To ensure that irrelevant information was not admitted in court, the International Criminal Tribunal for the Former Yugoslavia drew up certain rules, which could serve as a useful model for effective laws and procedures elsewhere. Rule 96 of the Tribunal specifies that in cases of sexual assault there is no need for corroboration of the victim's testimony and that the earlier sexual history of the victim is not to be disclosed as evidence. The rule also deals with the possible claim by the accused that there was consent to the act, stating that consent as a defense shall not be allowed if the victim has been subjected to or threatened with physical or psychological violence, or detention, or has had reason to fear such violence or detention. Furthermore, consent shall not be allowed under the rule if the victim had good reason to believe that if he or she did not submit, another person might be so subjected, threatened or put in fear. Even where the claim of consent is allowed to proceed, the accused has to satisfy the court that the evidence for such a claim is relevant and credible, before this evidence can be presented. (See presumption of guilt.)

In many countries, judges hand out particularly short sentences for sexual violence. One way of overcoming this has been to introduce minimum sentencing for convictions for rape, unless there are extenuating circumstances.

=== International treaties ===
International treaties are important as they set standards for national legislation and provide a lever for local groups to campaign for legal reforms. Among the relevant treaties that relate to sexual violence and its prevention include:

- the Convention on the Elimination of All Forms of Discrimination Against Women (1979);
- the Convention on the Rights of the Child (1989) and its Optional Protocol on the Sale of Children, Child Prostitution and Child Pornography (2000);
- the Convention Against Transnational Organized Crime (2000) and its supplemental Protocol to Prevent, Suppress and Punish Trafficking in Persons, Especially Women and Children (2000);
- the Convention Against Torture and Other Cruel, Inhuman or Degrading Treatment or Punishment (1984).

A huge number of international agreements set norms and limits of behaviour, including behaviour in conflicts, that necessitate provisions in national legislation. The Rome Statute of the International Criminal Court (1998), for instance, covers a broad spectrum of gender-specific crimes, including rape, sexual slavery, enforced prostitution, forced pregnancy and forced sterilization. It also includes certain forms of sexual violence that constitute a breach or serious violation of the 1949 Geneva Conventions, as well as other forms of sexual violence that are comparable in gravity to crimes against humanity. The inclusion of gender crimes in the definitions of the statute is an important historical development in international law.

== Actions to prevent other forms of sexual violence ==
=== Sexual trafficking ===
Initiatives to prevent the trafficking of people for sexual purposes have generally aimed to:

- create economic programs in certain countries for women at risk of being trafficked;
- provide information and raise awareness so that women at potential risk are aware of the danger of trafficking.

In addition, several government programs and nongovernmental organizations are developing services for the victims of trafficking. In Cyprus, the Aliens and Immigration Department approaches women entering the country to work in the entertainment or domestic service sectors. The Department advises the women on their rights and obligations and on available forms of protection against abuse, exploitation and procurement into prostitution. In the European Union and the United States, victims of trafficking willing to cooperate with the judicial system in prosecuting traffickers can receive temporary residence permits. In Belgium and Italy, shelters have been set up for victims of trafficking. In Mumbai, India, an antitrafficking centre has been set up to facilitate the arrest and prosecution of offenders, and to provide assistance and information to trafficked women.

=== Genital cutting ===
Cutting of human genitals without medical need is viewed by some to be sexual violence. Khafagi has argued that female circumcision (female genital cutting) should be understood from the perspective of those who perform them and that such knowledge can be used to design culturally appropriate interventions to prevent the practices. In the Kapchorwa district of Uganda, the REACH programme sought to enlist the support of elders in the community in detaching the practice of female circumcision from the cultural values it served. Alternative activities were proposed to sustain original cultural ideals. The United Nations Population Fund called the programme's reduction of female circumcision in the district a success.

=== Child marriage ===
Child marriage has a cultural basis and is often legal, so the task of achieving change is considerable. Simply outlawing early marriages will not, of itself, usually be sufficient to prevent the practice. In many countries the process of registering births is so irregular that age at first marriage may not be known. Approaches that address poverty, an important underlying factor in many such marriages, and those that stress educational goals, the health consequences of early childbirth and the rights of children are more likely to achieve results.

=== Rape during armed conflicts ===
The issue of sexual violence in armed conflicts has recently again been brought to the fore by organizations such as the Association of the Widows of the Genocide (AVEGA) and the Forum for African Women Educationalists. The former has supported war widows and rape victims in Rwanda and the latter has provided medical care and counselling to victims in Sierra Leone.

In 1995, the Office of the United Nations High Commissioner for Refugees released guidelines on the prevention of and response to sexual violence among refugee populations. These guidelines include provisions for:

- the design and planning of camps, to reduce susceptibility to violence;
- documenting cases;
- educating and training staff to identify, respond to and prevent sexual violence;
- medical care and other support services, including procedures to avoid further trauma to victims.

The guidelines also cover public awareness campaigns, educational activities and the setting up of women's groups to report and respond to violence. Based on work in Guinea and the United Republic of Tanzania, the International Rescue Committee has developed a programme to combat sexual violence in refugee communities. It includes the use of participatory methods to assess the prevalence of sexual and gender-based violence in refugee populations, the training and deployment of community workers to identify cases and set up appropriate prevention systems, and measures for community leaders and other officials to prosecute perpetrators. The programme has been used in many places against sexual and gender-based violence, including Bosnia and Herzegovina, the Democratic Republic of the Congo, East Timor, Kenya, Sierra Leone and North Macedonia.

== See also ==
- Anti-rape movement
- Community accountability
- Erin Merryn
- Ni Putes Ni Soumises (Neither Whores Nor Submissives)
- Outline of domestic violence
- Rape crisis center
- Sexual Abuse Prevention Network
- Subway shirt
- Women Power Line 1090
