= Rape crisis centre =

Support centre for victims of rape and sexual assault

A rape crisis centre, also known as a sexual assault crisis centre or sexual assault referral centre (SARC), is a specialised centre to support victims of rape or other sexual assault, both in the immediate aftermath of the assault and in the months and sometimes years following the attack. They are usually situated in a secure location and employ a multidisciplinary team of practitioners to provide medical, psychological, and practical support to the victim.

== Description ==
Rape crisis centres typically provide medical, practical, and emotional support to the victim in the aftermath of rape, sexual assault or sexual abuse.

== By country ==
=== Australia ===
In Australia, there are a number of state- and territory-based rape crisis centres, such as Full Stop Australia (the first in Australia, founded as Sydney Rape Crisis Collective in 1971) (Note: Renamed NSW Rape Crisis Centre in 1998, then Rape & Domestic Violence Services Australia in 2013, then Full Stop Australia in 2021.) in New South Wales; Canberra Rape Crisis Centre in the Australian Capital Territory; Yarrow Place in South Australia. In Victoria, the Sexual Assault Services Victoria (SASVic, formerly CASA Forum) is the umbrella body for Centres Against Sexual Assault, or CASAs, located across the state. In the Northern Territory, there are a number of Sexual assault referral centres (SARCs) which provide support, education, and advocacy. There is only 24/7 access to medical, legal and counselling information at Darwin and Alice Springs SARCs. In Western Australia there are five Sexual Assault Support Services in the regions, and a SARC in Perth. Most of the state and territory services have a help line providing advice, and there is also a national 24/7 help line, 1800RESPECT.

=== Canada ===
In Canada, the networks of rape crisis centres are provincially- and territorially-based, but there is a national body named the Canadian Association of Sexual Assault Centres (CASAC). In Ontario, the Ontario Coalition of Rape Crisis Centres (OCRC) is the umbrella body for centres in that province. Vancouver Rape Relief & Women's Shelter is Canada's longest-running rape crisis centre.

=== Ireland ===
In Ireland, the Dublin Rape Crisis Centre, a national service, provides a range of services, including a 24-hour helpline, counselling services, accompanying victims to court, and outreach services, along with provision of training and advocacy work.

=== New Zealand ===
In New Zealand (Māori: Aotearoa), groups to support victims of rape and sexual abuse were set up during the 1970s, and in 1986 "Rape Crisis and Related Groups" (RCRG) were established. These groups were run by trained volunteers, and provided immediate crisis support as well as ongoing counselling; judicial advocacy work; and help for victims in their dealings with police, doctors, Accident Compensation Corporation, and the Department of Social Welfare. Over time, the number of support groups first grew, and then declined, largely through lack of funding and changing legislation. RCRG was run as a collective, and was underpinned by a feminist philosophy, which clashed with neo-liberal ideologies which came to the fore in the 21st century. By 2000 there were only 25 functioning rape crisis centres, and the national office in Wellington was closed. By 2018 there were only six such centres.

As of 2023, the Sexual Abuse Assessment and Treatment Service (SAATS) is a national service providing medical assistance to sexual assault victims. There are a number of not-for-profit centres focusing on different groups, such as Māori women, or male victims, some explicitly named rape crisis centre, such as Wellington Rape Crisis. There are local and national help lines.

=== South Africa ===
In South Africa, Thuthuzela Care Centres have become a model for best practice in care after sexual assault. The name is derived from the Xhosa word thuthuzela, meaning "comfort".

=== United Kingdom ===
In the UK, sexual assault referral centres or SARCs exist across the country, funded and run by the National Health Service. Their staff comprise specifically-trained doctors, nurses, and other support staff. The first SARC was established in 1986 at St Mary's Hospital in Manchester, as St Mary's Sexual Assault Referral Centre or SARC. In the 1990s, there were two more SARCs established, REACH in Northumbria and STAR in West Yorkshire.

A mixed methods study reviewed SARCs in the UK. It found that people were mostly positive about sexual assault referral centres and the voluntary sector (few interactions, 1% and 4% respectively, were experienced as harmful). Feedback was mixed about wider NHS services (including general practice and sexual health clinics, for example, but not SARCs) and the police and criminal justice service (15% and 25% of interactions, respectively, were experienced as harmful). People reported improvements in symptoms of post-traumatic stress disorder (PTSD) 1 year after accessing SARCs.

There are also crisis centres run as charitable organisations, overseen by umbrella organisations Rape Crisis England & Wales and Rape Crisis Scotland. They not only work to end sexual assault and abuse, but also provides specialist information and support to anyone who has been affected by any other form of sexual violence and abuse in England and Wales. They act as an umbrella organisation for 39 member rape crisis centres as of 2023. The member organisations, such as Northamptonshire Rape Crisis, are typically independent charities staffed by a mix of paid staff and trained volunteers, and are run with the support of or collaboration with local councils, police forces, and corporate sponsors. Edinburgh Rape Crisis is one of Scotland's largest centres. However, as of April 2023 rape crisis centres across the UK have had to close waiting lists owing to shortage of funds and staff. Rape Crisis Northern Ireland, located in Belfast, covers Northern Ireland.

=== United States ===
The first American rape crisis centers (RCCs) were formed in several states throughout the country in the early 1970s, largely by women associated with the second-wave feminist movement. Central to second-wave feminism was the practice of consciousness raising, which allowed groups of women to speak openly about their experiences with sexual violence and the shortcomings of law enforcement, health care providers, and the criminal justice system to effectively and constructively respond to survivors.Among the first was the Washington D.C. Rape Crisis Center, founded in 1972 by women identifying with the radical branch of the women's movement. The D.C. RCC published a pamphlet entitled "How to Start a Rape Crisis Center", which provided a model for other early RCCs to follow.

While the goals of RCCs have remained largely unchanged since their creation in the 1970s, they have undergone a number of structural changes. Among these changes is the phenomenon of RCCs moving toward more professionalisation and hierarchy and away from the radical activism that defines their roots. Many RCCs, rather than being freestanding collectives, are incorporated into the mainstream organisations that they once worked against, such as hospitals or other social services agencies. These trends are related to the political climate and also the availability of government money to fund their activities. Despite the fact that RCCs now more closely resemble mainstream organisations, they still occupy an important place in the anti-rape movement. When dealing with rape survivors, the fact that RCCs have no interest other than in providing emotional support and assistance to survivors distinguishes them from physicians who are primarily concerned with treating injuries, law enforcement officers who are primarily concerned with ascertaining facts, or prosecutors who primarily concerned with building a case. RCCs are further separated from mainstream organisations by their consistent efforts to reform how these organisations respond to rape, primarily through the provision of training in appropriate rape definitions and responses.

RCCs may receive funding from a number of sources and funding can vary greatly for each RCC depending on its location, if it is affiliated with a host agency, and the type of host agency. RCCs housed in hospitals and county social service and health agencies generally have more funding than those situated in mental health centres, battered women's shelters, and legal-justice organisations.
