= Women in New Zealand =

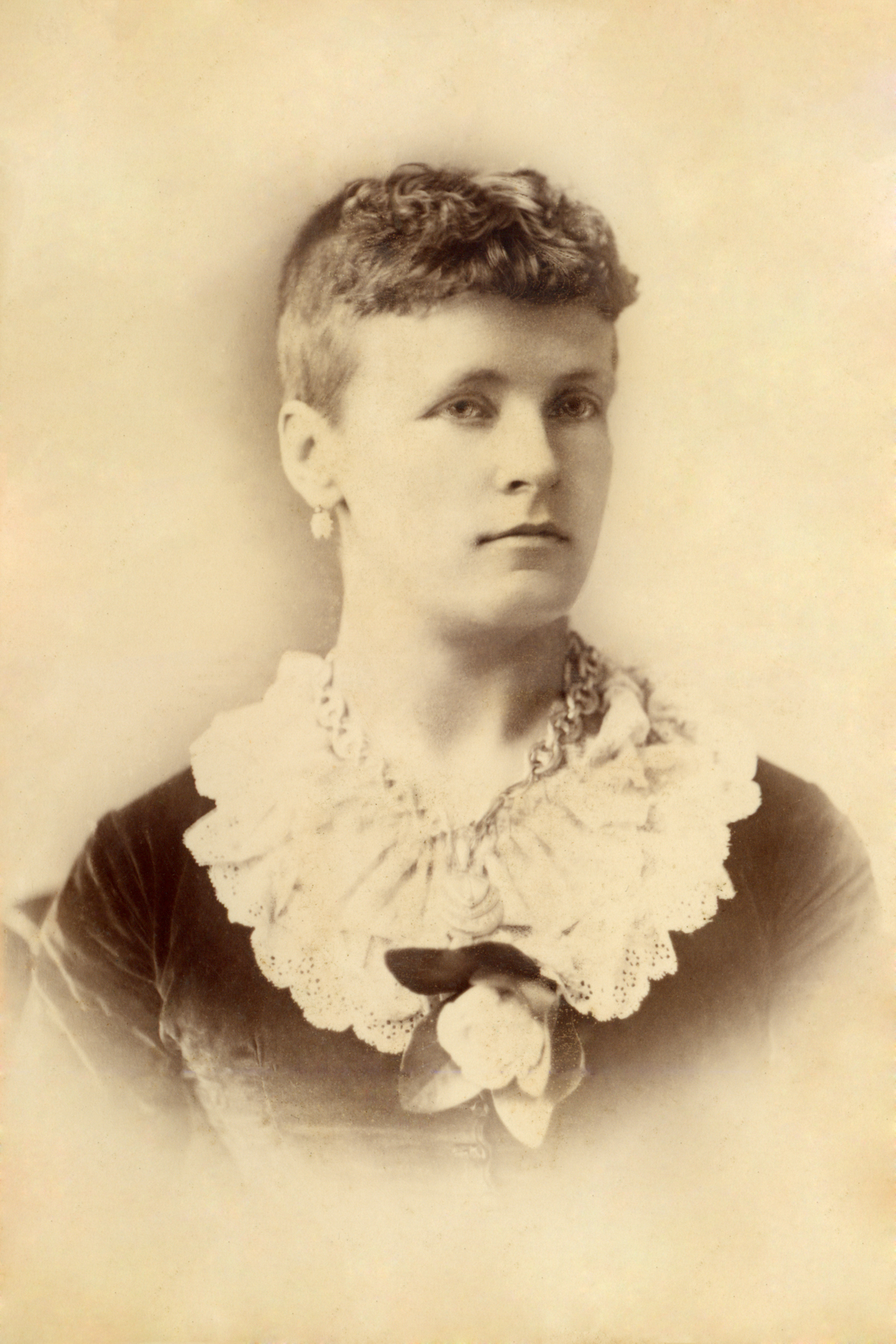
- Portrait of a New Zealand suffragist (c. 1880s). She has a white camellia (the NZ symbol of Women's Suffrage) and short hair, an action of protest during the period.

General statistics
- Maternal mortality (per 100,000): 15 (2010)
- Women in parliament: 40.8% (2019)
- Women over 25 with secondary education: 95.0% (2012)
- Women in labour force: 62.1% (2012)

Gender Inequality Index
- Value: 0.088 (2021)
- Rank: 25th out of 191

Global Gender Gap Index
- Value: 0.841 (2022)
- Rank: 4th out of 146

Women in New Zealand are women who live in or are from New Zealand. Notably New Zealand was the first self-governing country in the world where women were entitled to vote. In recent times New Zealand has had many women in top leadership and government roles, including three female prime ministers, most recently Jacinda Ardern.

== Political and legal history ==
=== 18th century ===
Prior to the colonisation of New Zealand, Māori women held a range of roles and responsibilities in society. High ranking Māori women could and did own and inherit land. Māori women held positions of social influence and some were signatories to the Treaty of Waitangi in 1840 which was a document between Māori and the British Crown to 'establish British law in new Zealand, while at the same time guaranteeing Māori authority over their land and culture.'

During the early to mid nineteenth century there were significant political and legal differences between the worlds of Māori and European women. Married European women were considered to be subsumed under their husbands' legal status and could not own land. With the introduction of the English legal system that occurred concurrently with the Crown of England establishing governance over New Zealand, in keeping with British common law, Māori women also became chattels of their husbands. The restricted position of women under English laws and customs constrained the actions of Māori and European women.

The first groups of Europeans to visit New Zealand at the end of the 18th century were almost all men and were sealers, whalers and missionaries. Men outnumbered women in the European populations as measured in a census from 1861 to 1926. Even though the founders of European settlement in New Zealand such as the New Zealand Company encouraged settlement by families instead of single men because women were believed to have a "civilising" influence there were still more men, mostly because of migration.

=== Late 19th century ===
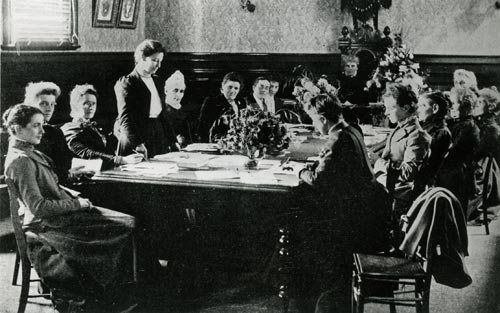
National Council of Women of New Zealand, 1901 meeting

After the New Zealand Wars around the late 1860s and early 1870s, iwi throughout New Zealand forged links to work together to have autonomy and a say through political means. Māori women were particularly influential at this time.

Ann Robertson is thought to be the first women to address parliament in 1884.

The Supreme Court ruled in November 1888 that a married woman could not hold a hotel licence to be a publican.

In 1893, New Zealand became the first self-governing country in the world to allow women to vote. This included both European and Māori women. Elizabeth Yates became the first female mayor in the British Empire in 1893.

=== Early 20th century ===
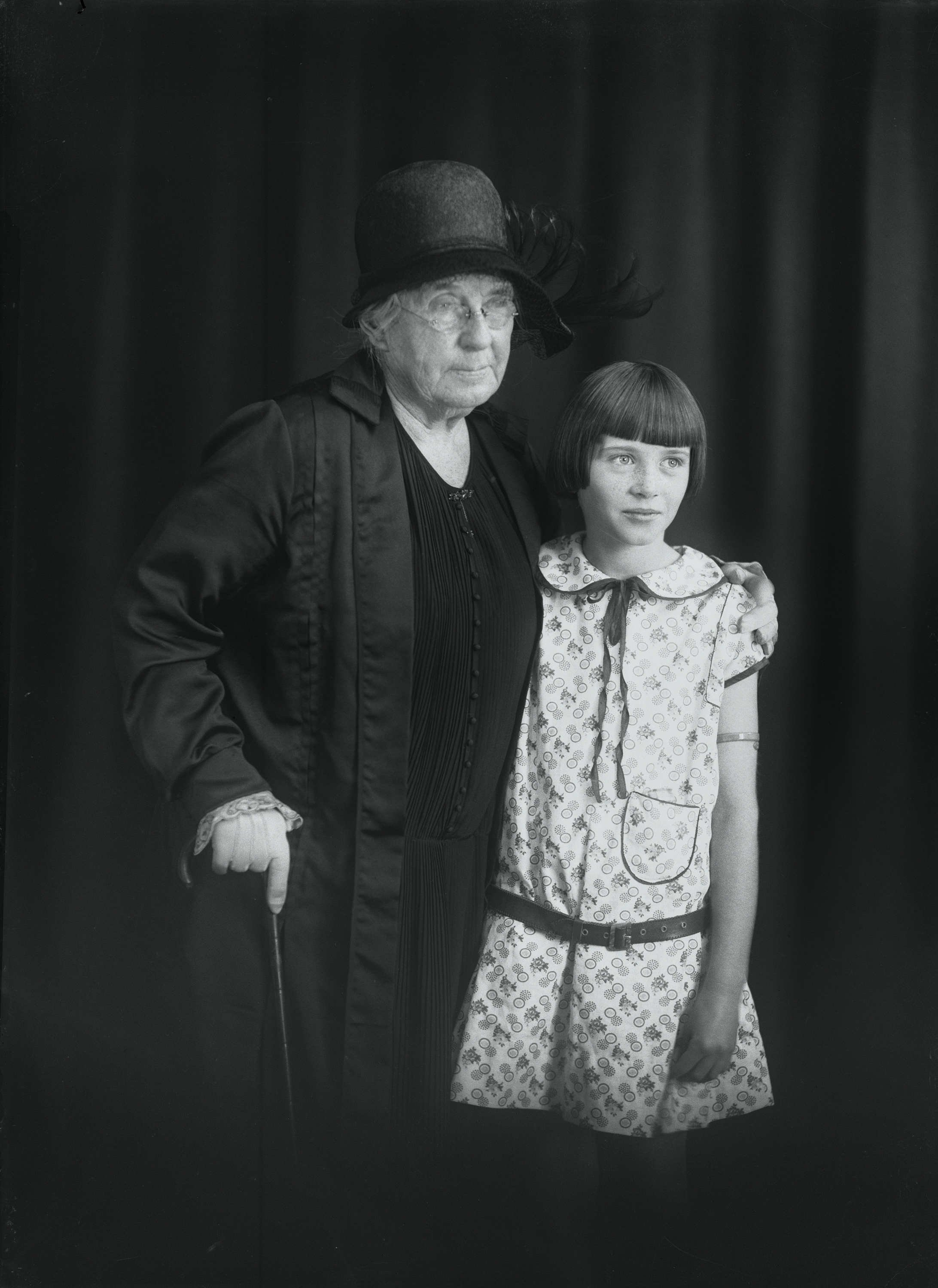
Woman and girl, c. 1925

In 1919 women were allowed to run for Parliament, and Elizabeth McCombs became the first women elected to the Parliament in 1933.

In the 1920 to 1950 period, there were significant changes in public policy that gradually extended economic citizenship to women. Attention at first focused on single women; later there were improvements for married women as well. Initially, families were the focus of benefit, so that the living wage applied only to married men with families to support. No women on their own were entitled to unemployment relief. Policy shifts partly reflected changes in the occupational profile of women from domestic to industrial employment.

=== 1940s – 1970s ===
Early twentieth-century party leaders were reluctant to allow women rights beyond basic suffrage, but wartime sped up change. By 1972, the Second Wave of Feminism and the changing attitudes of some party leaders resulted in women gaining more opportunities to become MPs and by 2001 an unprecedented number of women held leadership positions in the New Zealand Parliament.

World War II made women more visible and more essential. The absence of service men lead to the first women police officers completing their training in 1941. On October 26, 1942, the Women Jurors Act was passed which for the first time allowed women between the ages of 25 and 60 to have their names placed on the jury list on the same basis as men. Elaine Kingsford was New Zealand's first female juror and she sat on a case at the Auckland Supreme Court in 1943. Mary Anderson became the first woman to sit on a Magistrate's Court Bench in 1943 and then in 1946 she and Mary Dreaver, a former Member of the House of Representatives, became the first women to be appointed to the Legislative Council.

In 1949, Iriaka Rātana became the first Māori woman to win a seat in Parliament. By the late twentieth century there are many examples of women influencing politics and the legal system. One significant event was the 1975 Land March led by Dame Whina Cooper protesting ongoing Māori land alienation. She was 79 when she led this march commonly called a hīkoi (march) from the top of the North Island to Wellington to submit a petition to the prime minister, a walk of 1000 km.

Addressing inequalities for women came into play in New Zealand in the early 1970s with the Equal Pay Act 1972. This requires employers to pay men and women the same wages for the same work.

The protests of another Māori woman, Eva Rickard, over land also took place in the mid 1970s. Rickard was protesting land that was confiscated during World War II but then not returned as per the agreement. Later Rickard stood for Parliament for the Mana Motuhake Party and also formed her own party, Mana Māori.

=== 1980s – 2000 ===
A woman created much unintended publicity over a controversy in 1984 when telephone tolls operator Naida Glavish (of Ngāti Whātua) answered calls with the Māori language greeting ‘Kia ora’. Her supervisor insisted that she use only English greetings, Glavish refused and was demoted.

The Ministry of Women's Affairs was established in 1985, and is known in 2020 as the Ministry for Women.

In 1990 Dame Catherine Tizard, a former mayor of Auckland, became the first woman governor-general and held the post until 1996. Dame Silvia Cartwright became the first woman High Court judge in 1993.

In 1997 Jenny Shipley became the first woman prime minister of New Zealand. Prior to becoming prime minister, Shipley held several portfolios, including women's affairs, but was best known for social welfare and health, where she oversaw radical and sometimes controversial reforms driven by Ruth Richardson's policies. After leaving Parliament, Shipley became a company director in Auckland, she also became Dame Jenny Shipley in 2009. Whilst Shipley was prime minister for only two years, she held some strong and influential views on what constituted leadership. For Shipley, leadership meant that when things happen, you pick yourself up and make the best of the situation.

In 1999, Helen Clark became the second woman (and first elected woman) prime minister of New Zealand. Clark served three terms in office and was prime minister until 2008. When Clark resigned as Labour Party leader in 2008, she joined the UN and in 2017 the Richtopia list named Clark as the third most influential woman in the world. Clark ran for the position of Secretary General in 2017 though was unsuccessful. Clark says herself that while she did not find there was a glass ceiling in New Zealand to break, she met one in the UN where countries were just not used to women leaders, like New Zealand was.

==== Gallery ====
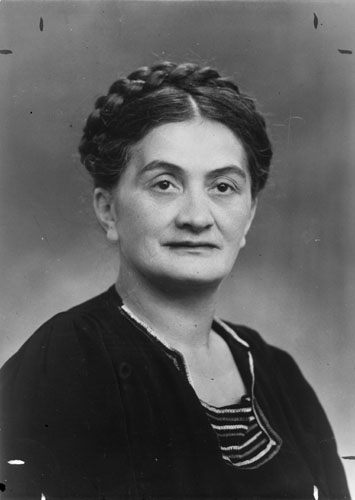
Iriaka Rātana

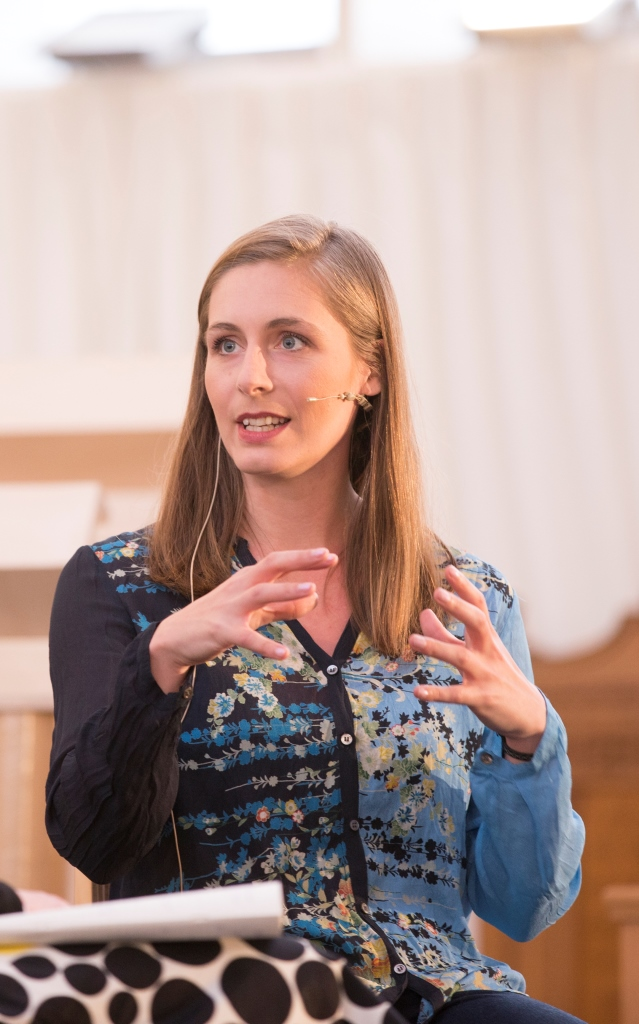
Eleanor Catton

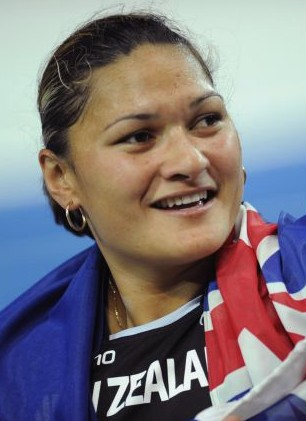
Valerie Adams (Vili)

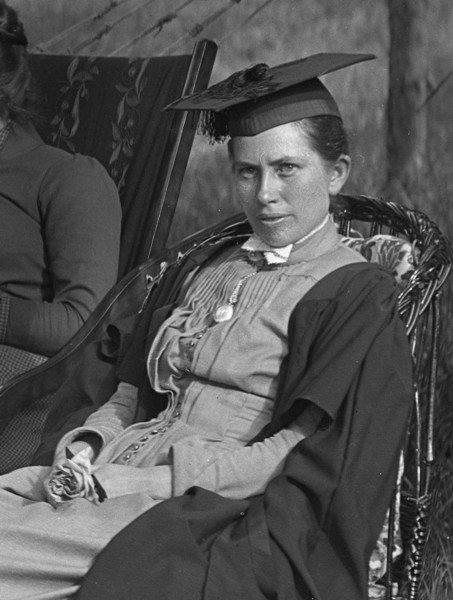
Kate Edger

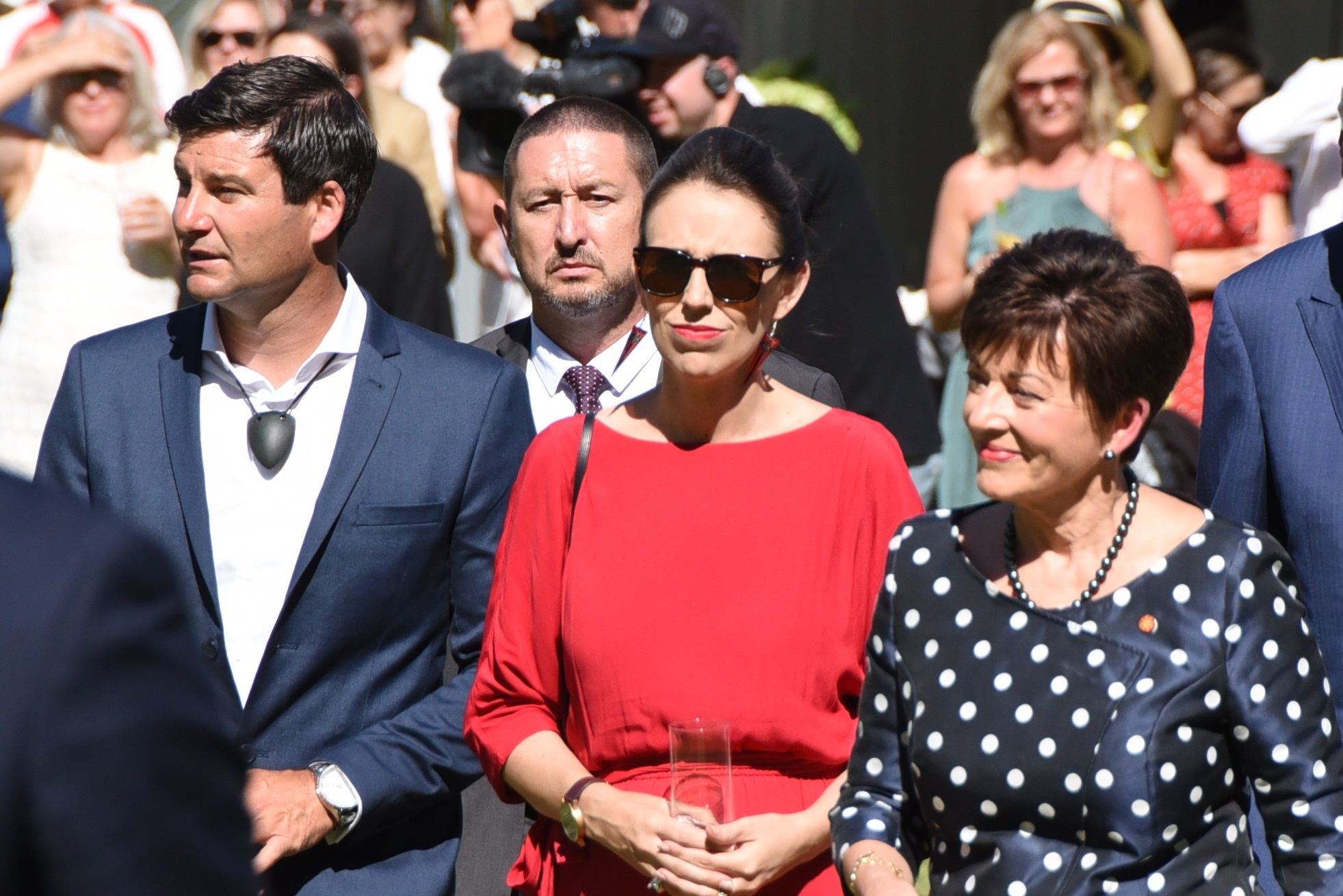
Jacinda Ardern and Patsy Reddy on Waitangi Day

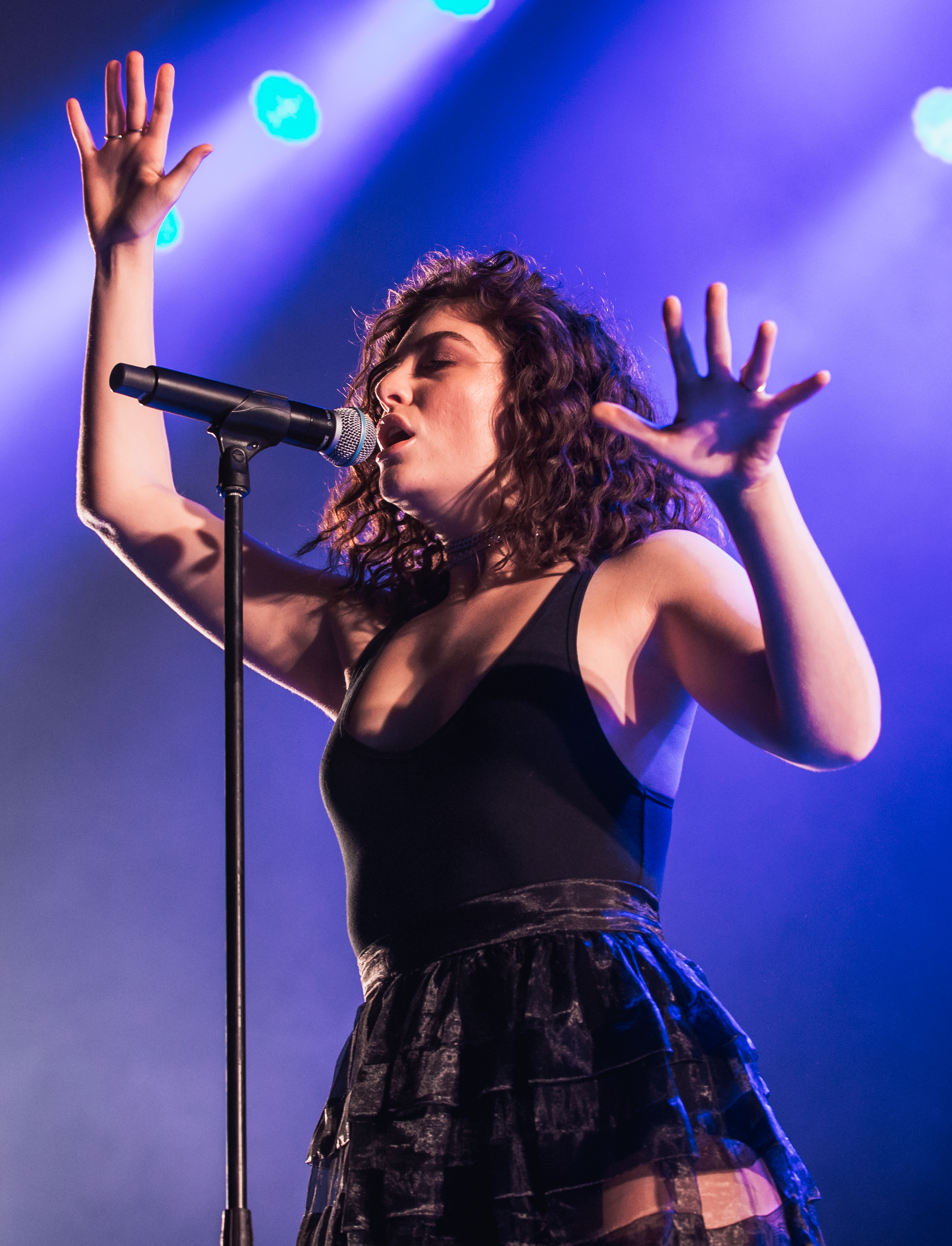
Lorde

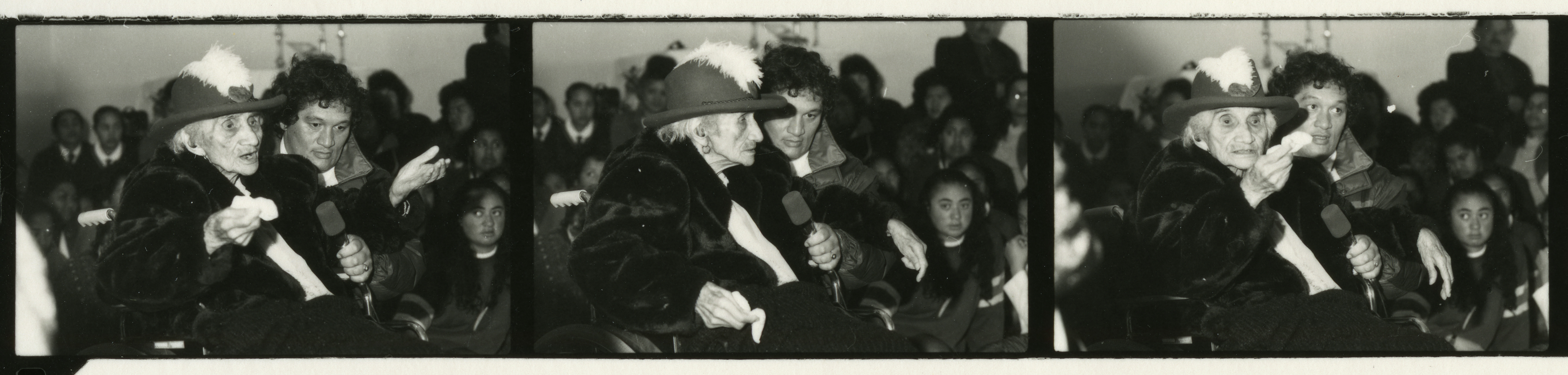
Dame Whina Cooper, 1993

=== 2000 to present ===
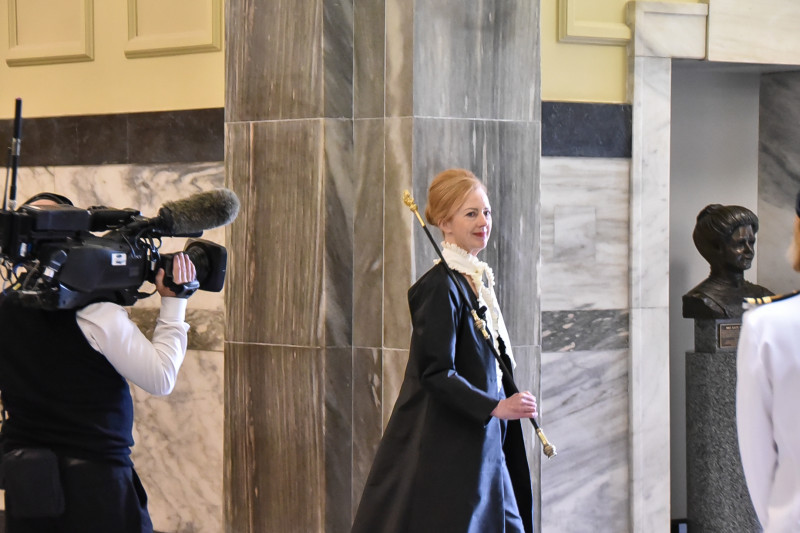
Sandra McKie, Usher of the Black Rod, at the State Opening of Parliament

In 2001 Dame Silvia Cartwright became governor-general, which for the first time in New Zealand's history meant women held four of the country's top political and legal positions of prime minister (Helen Clark), opposition leader (Jenny Shipley), chief justice (Sian Elias) and attorney-general (Margaret Wilson).

In 2017, Jacinda Ardern became New Zealand's third female prime minister. She was re-elected in 2020.

In January 2019, women made up 40.8% of the unicameral New Zealand Parliament. There are 120 members, 49 of whom are women. In the 2020 election the percentage rose to a new high with close to 48% women. The Labour party won 64 seats and has 55% women. The Green party won 10 seats and has 70% women. In the ceremonial role of Usher of the Black Rod at State Opening of Parliament, Sandra McKie was appointed, the first time a woman performed these duties in the 128-year history of this event.

In 2020, the Parental Leave and Employment Protection Act 1987 governs parental leave entitlements along with providing protections of rights of employees during pregnancy and parental leave.

Upon the swearing in of list MP Soraya Peke-Mason on 25 October 2022, parliament was for the first time in history represented 50% by women.

== Selected development and advancements of women ==
=== Education ===
In 1877 Kate Edger was the first woman to earn a university degree in New Zealand as well as the first woman in the British empire to earn a Bachelor of arts degree. Helen Connon was Canterbury college's first female student to graduate with a Bachelor of Arts degree in 1880. In 1881 she went on to be the first woman in the British Empire to graduate with an Honors Degree. Early university graduates were Emily Siedeberg (doctor, graduated 1895) and Ethel Benjamin (lawyer, graduated 1897). The Female Law Practitioners Act was passed in 1896 and Benjamin was admitted as a barrister and solicitor of the Supreme Court of New Zealand in 1897.

=== Governmental goals ===
New Zealand's government is making efforts towards improving its overall economic status and prosperity through increasing women's involvement and leadership in society.

In 2004, a five-year plan known as The Action Plan for New Zealand Women was launched in an attempt to progress work-life balance, economic stability, and well-being for women. In response to this proposed plan, 52 meetings along with stakeholder meetings took place in an effort to deliberate and advocate the new priorities for women.

=== Disabled women's access to education and employment ===
As of 2006, about 332,600 women (16.2%) were considered to have a disability with only about 50% of those women having an involvement in the labor force compared to men with about 70% involved. Women with disabilities in New Zealand lack access to programs to help learn the ways to utilise their disabilities, potentially explaining the large number of women who are not in the labor force.

In February 2009, a Ministerial Committee on Disability Issues was created by the government of the day to target issues such as: modern disability support, making New Zealand accessible for the disabled, and getting more citizens to contribute to the effort. These efforts make up the vision outlined in the New Zealand Disability Strategy.

=== First women enter police training ===
When the pressure of the Second World War began to take a toll on the workforce, New Zealand's National Council of Women started pushing for the approval of female officers. In 1941 this idea became reality when 10 women from numerous parts of New Zealand were recruited. There were numerous requirements the trainees were required to meet, like being between 25 and 40 years of age, well educated, single, and a few others. The first 10 women to be recruited trained at the Police Training school in Wellington for three months. The women completed their training in October, then sent to work as temporary constables in various detective branches. They dealt mainly with cases involving women and delinquent children. Despite having full authority to arrest lawbreakers, the women were not uniformed until 1952.

== Notable New Zealand women ==
- Katherine Mansfield (writer)
- Whina Cooper (Māori leader)
- Eva Rickard (politician and activist)
- Frances Hodgkins (artist)
- Nancy Wake (war heroine)
- Janet Frame (poet)
- Jane Campion (filmmaker)
- Jean Batten (aviator)
- Lorde (singer)
- Valerie Adams (shot putter)
- Kiri te Kanawa (opera singer)
- Kate Sheppard (suffragist)
- Mabel Howard (politician)
- Eleanor Catton (writer)
- Lydia Ko (golfer)
- Melanie Lynskey (actress)
- Anna Paquin (actress)
- Jenny Shipley (first woman prime minister)
- Helen Clark (first elected woman prime minister)
- Jacinda Ardern (third woman prime minister)

=== Gallery ===
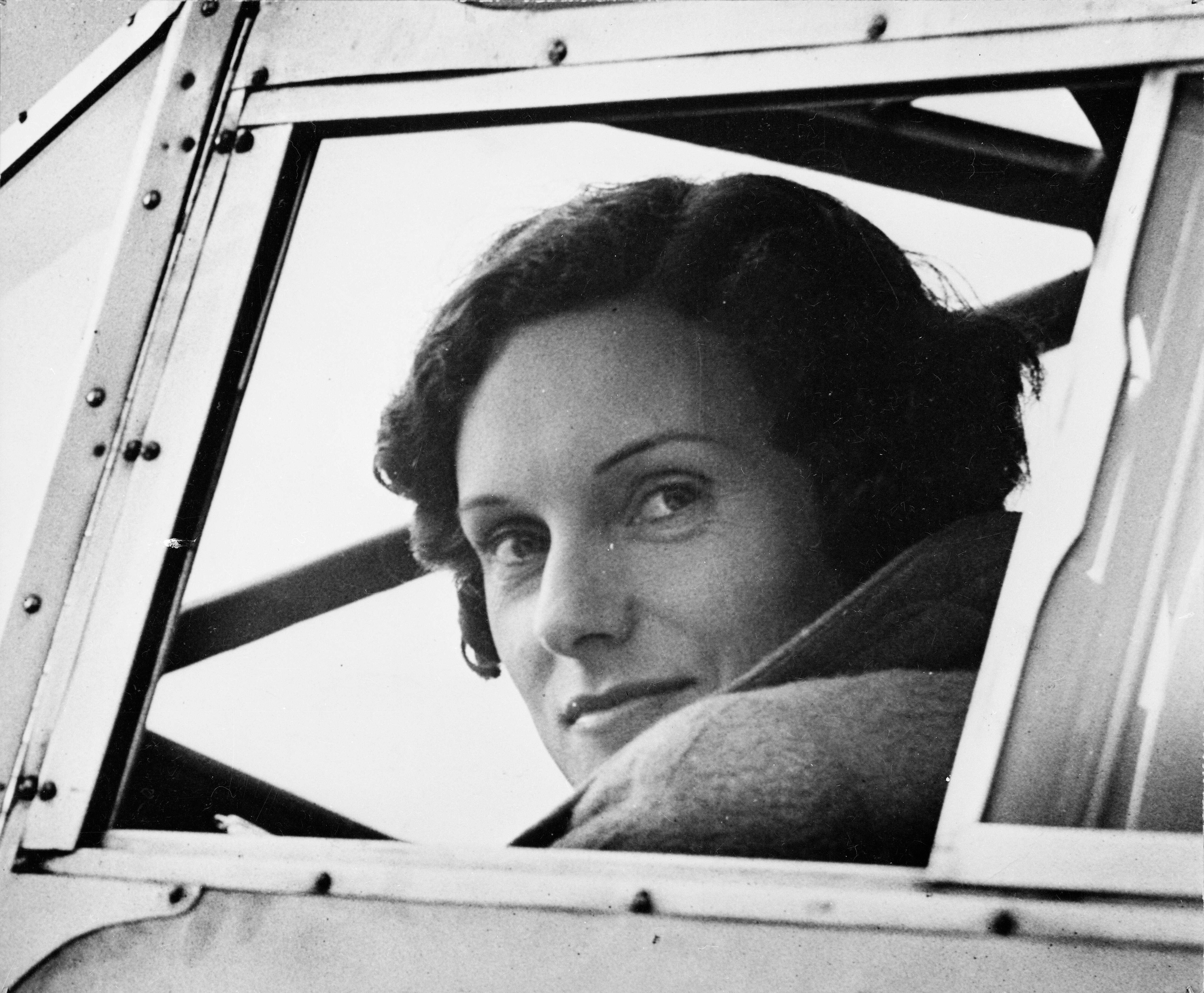
Jean Batten

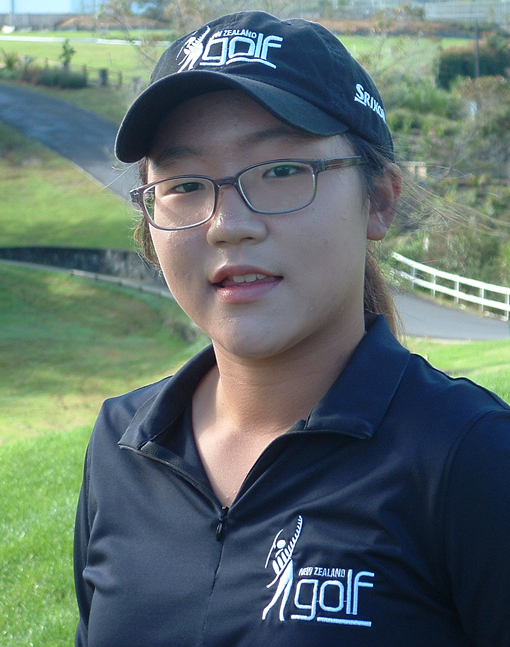
Lydia Ko

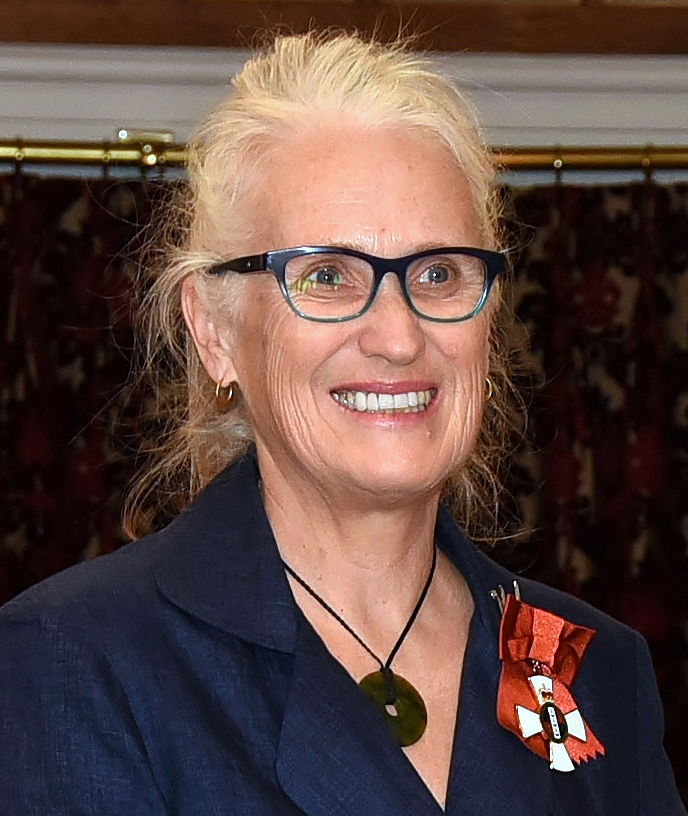
Jane Campion

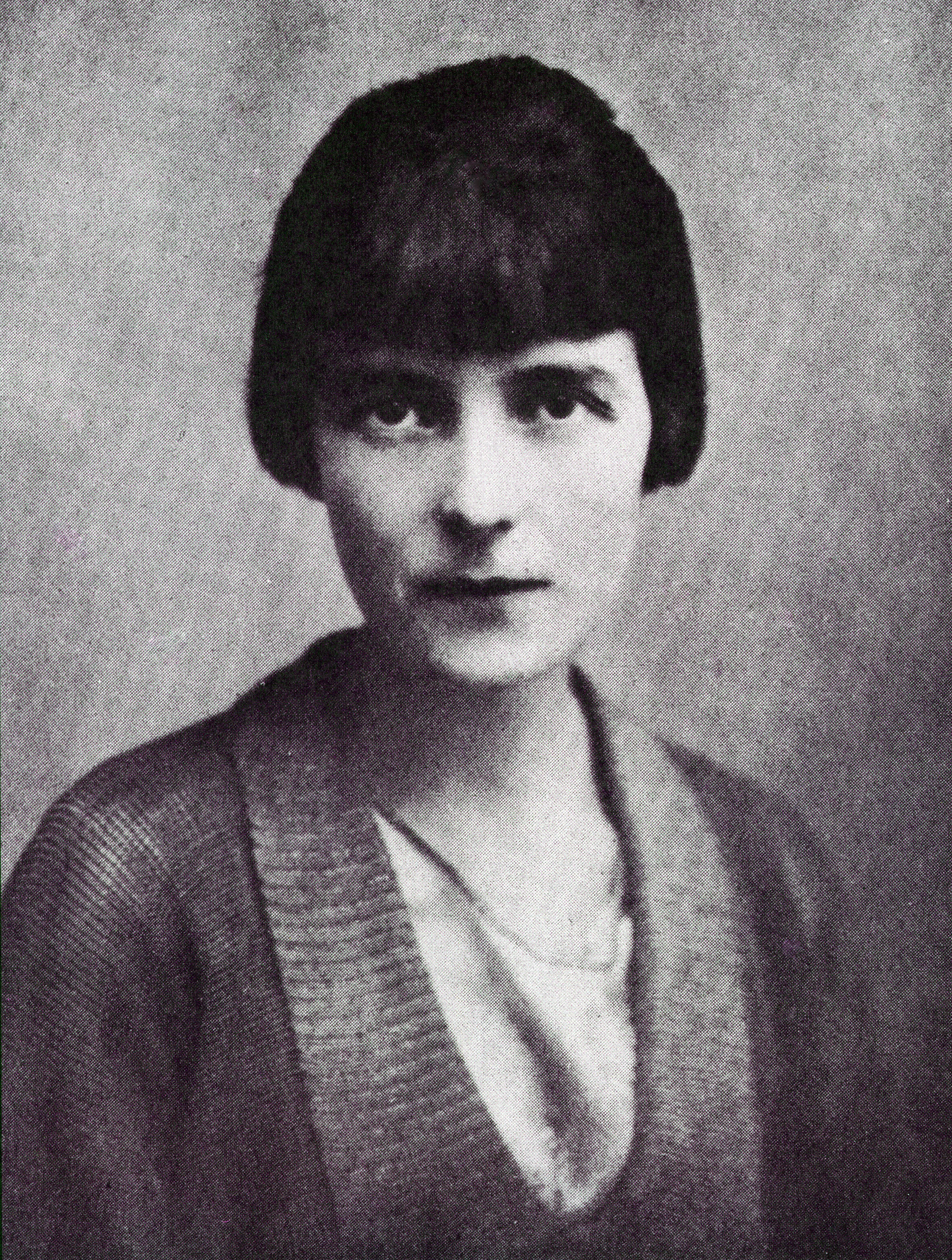
Katherine Mansfield

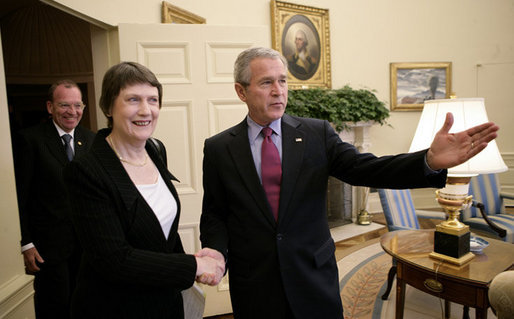
Helen Clark and George W. Bush

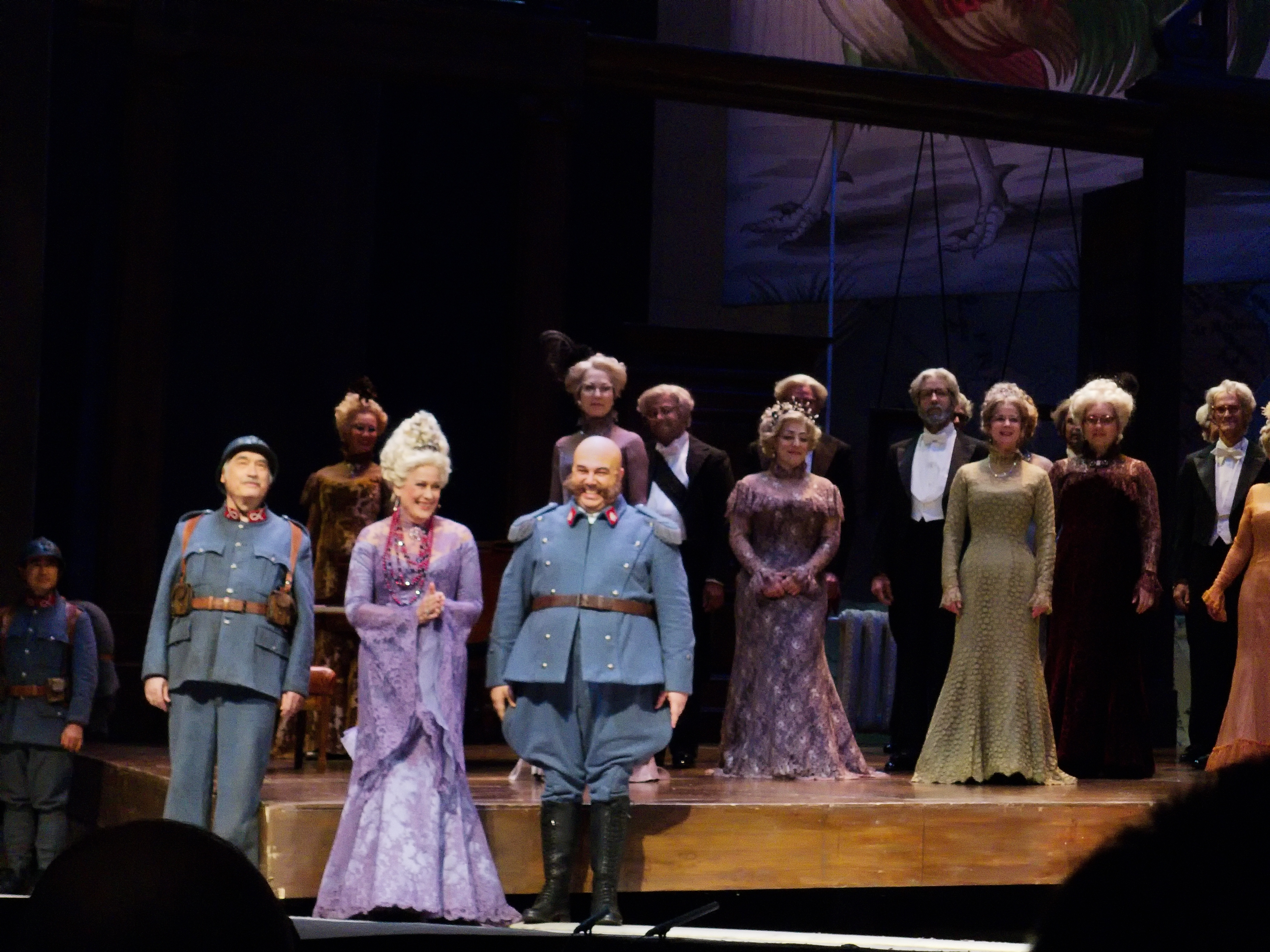
Kiri Te Kanawa

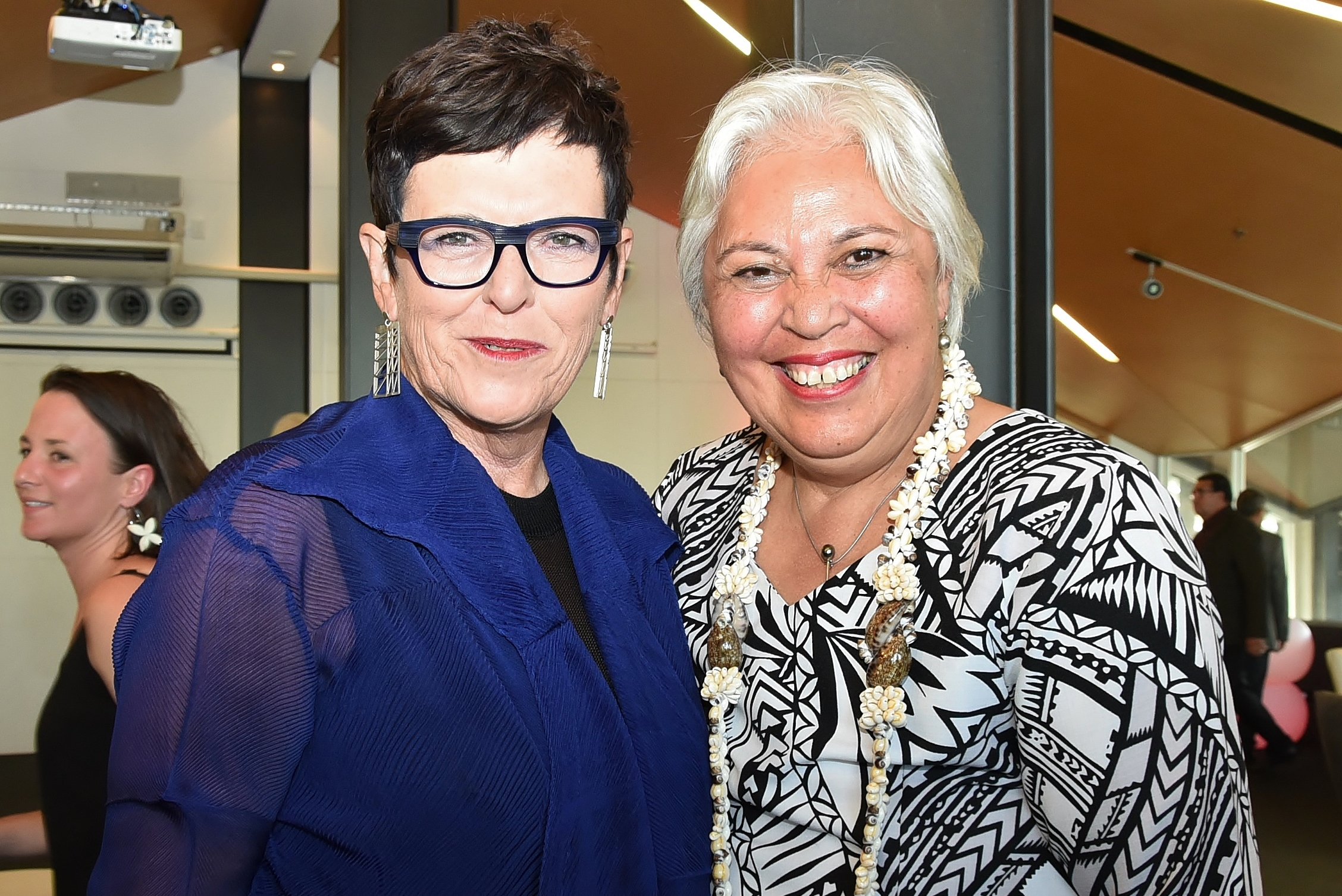
Jenny Shipley and Winnie Laban

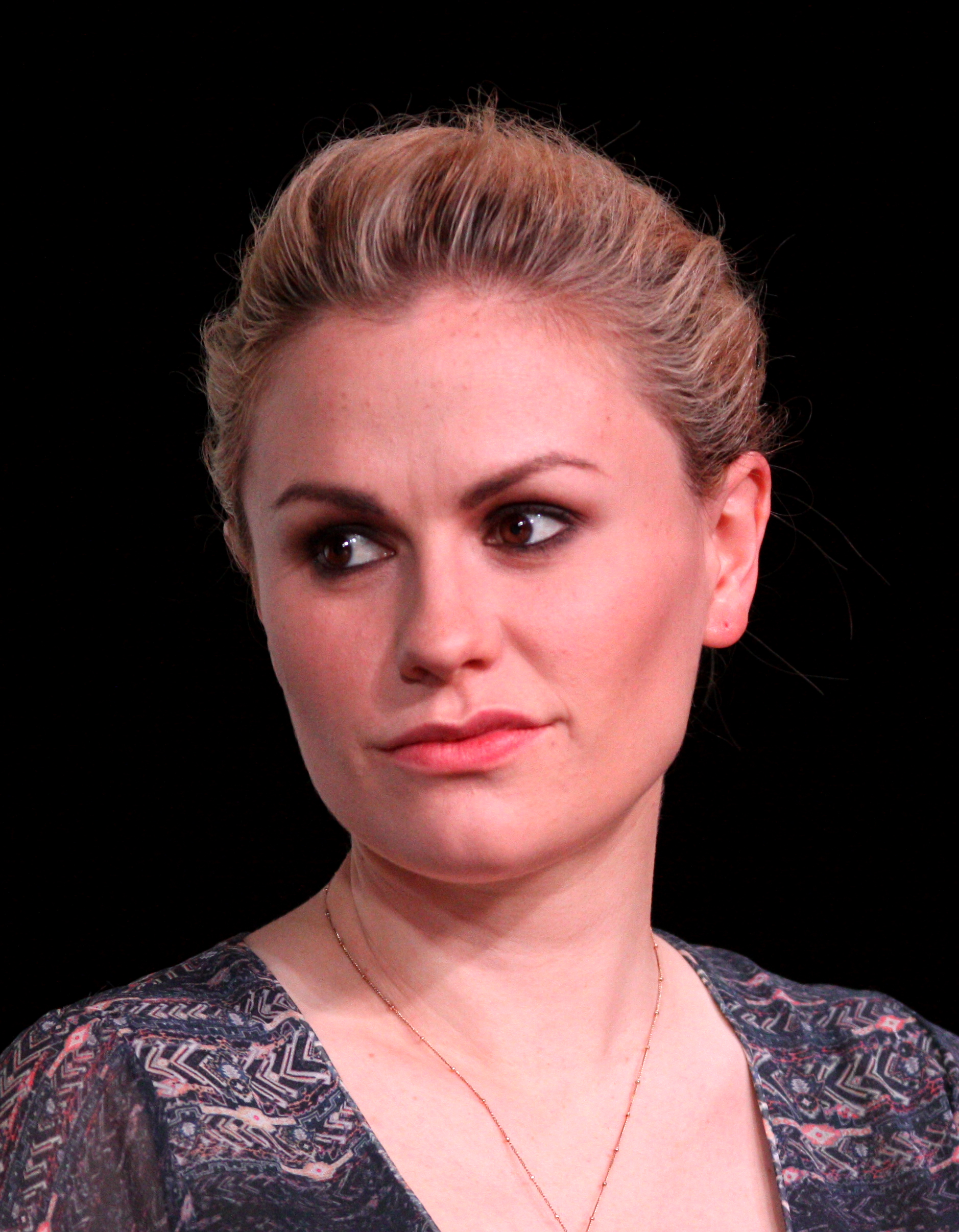
Anna Paquin

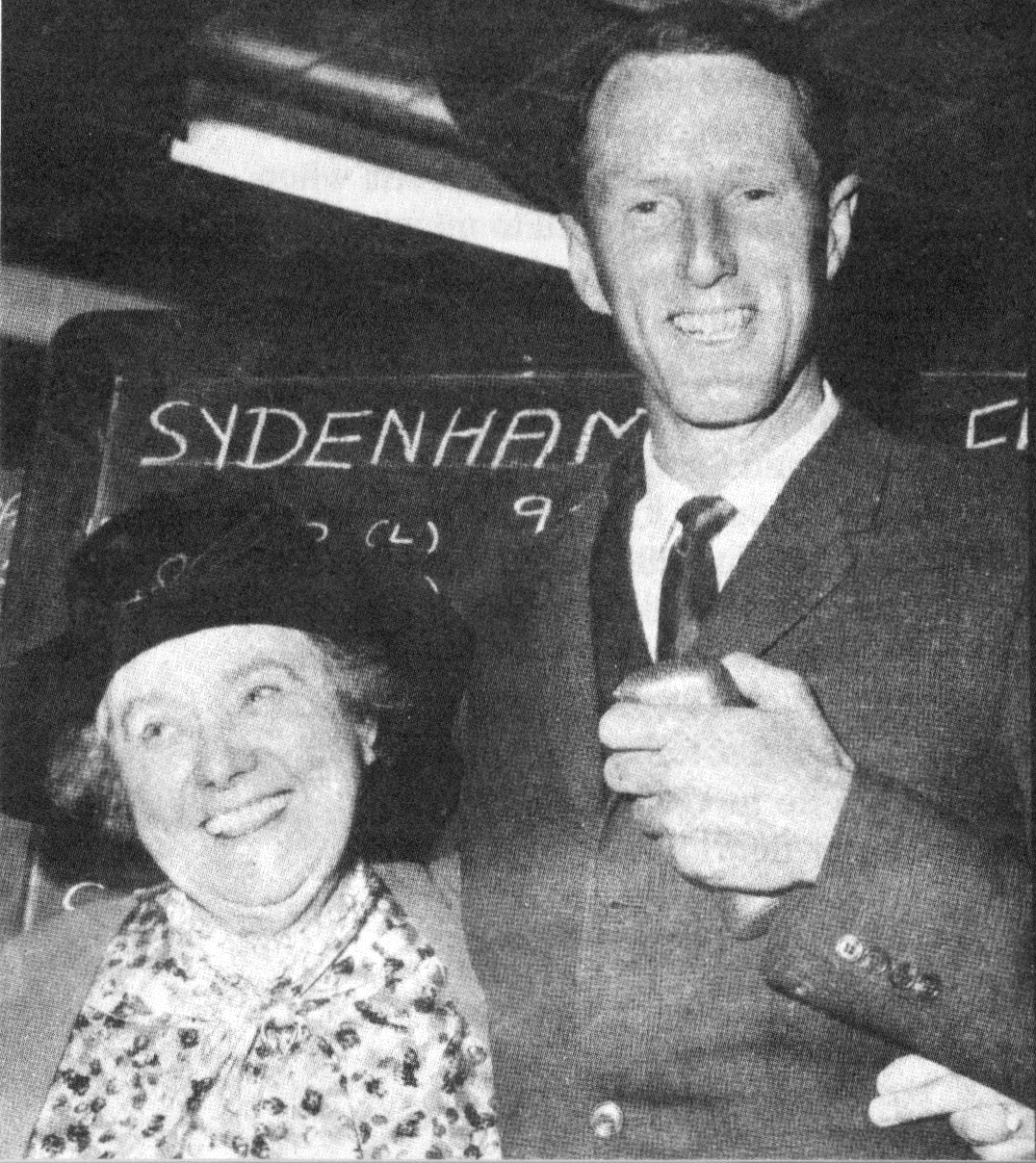
Mabel Howard and Derek Quigley

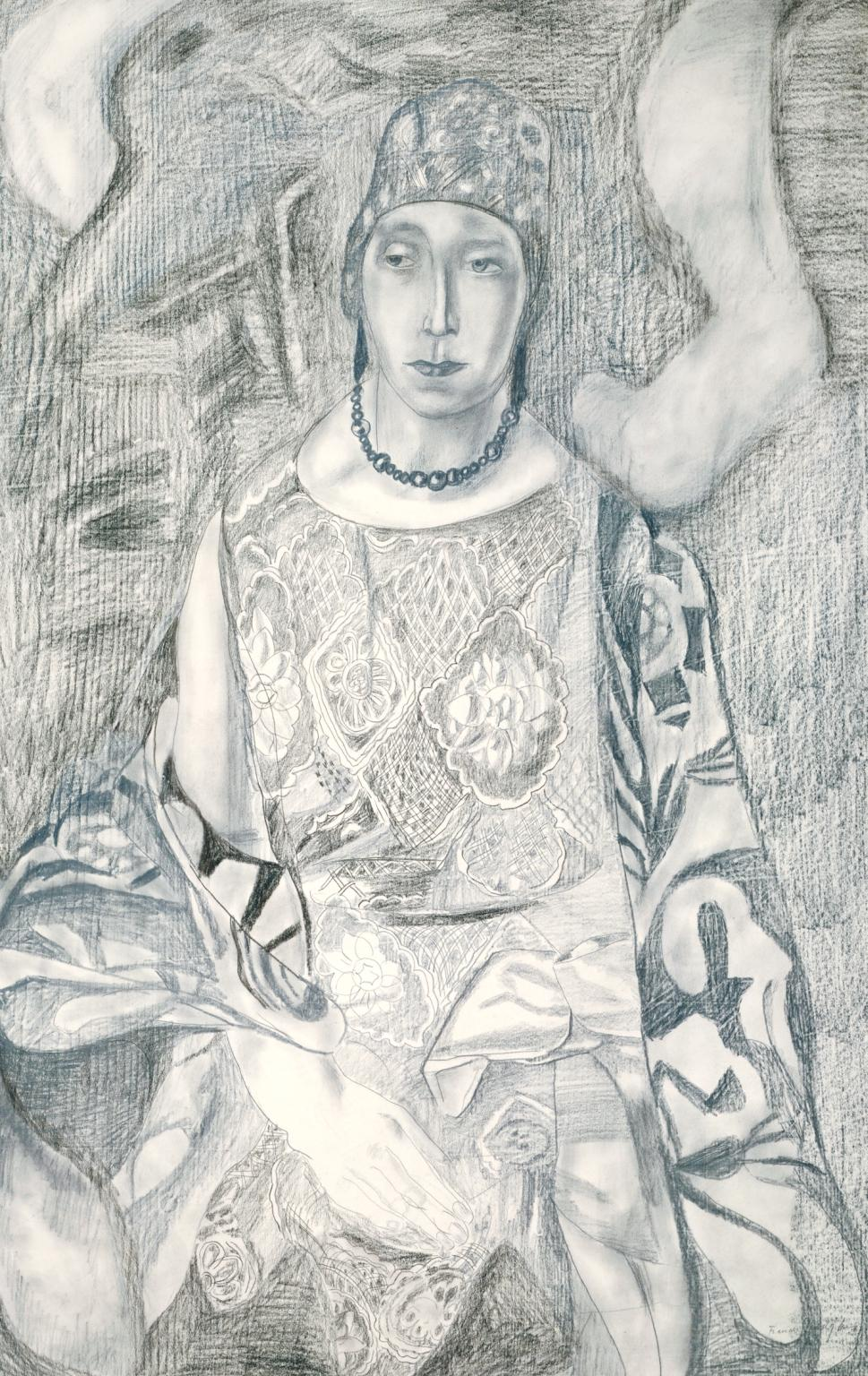
Frances Hodgkins Seated Woman

== Discrimination ==
Inequality between men and women exists in New Zealand and is a legacy of colonisation. In New Zealand society and Pākehā (European) institutions until the 1960s, women were expected to fulfill a limited role centering on marriage, motherhood, and taking care of husband, home and children. Men had the role to support their wives and children financially, by working or using their family funds. This division in roles impacted on every aspect of women's lives, regardless of their own talents and ambitions, or their economic and social realities (such as having to raise children alone). Public culture focused almost entirely on men and their interests. Men also represented both themselves and their families in public affairs and over this time through the 19th century up until the 1960s men held most of the leadership and management roles in public and private institutions.

As of 2023, the gender pay gap in New Zealand is 9.2%.

New Zealand has anti-discrimination and human rights laws including the New Zealand Bill of Rights Act 1990, the Human Rights Act 1993 and the Equal Pay Act 1972.

On 10 January 1985 New Zealand ratified the Convention on the Elimination of All Forms of Discrimination against Women (CEDAW) with reservations. In 1989, 2003 and 2007, New Zealand withdrew its three reservations.

The New Zealand government is subject to the United Nations periodic reporting procedures in relation to those conventions which it has ratified. The 9th Periodic Report on CEDAW was submitted in July 2023. The UN reporting committee's concluding remarks noted several positive changes since the previous report. However, the committee noted a number of continuing concerns, including women's access to justice, gender-based violence against women and nationality matters.

The previous report commended the measures taken to ensure the protection of women's rights in New Zealand, and made recommendations covering a wide range of issues including the visibility of CEDAW; access to justice; eliminating gender-based violence against women; accelerating women's equal representation in decision-making positions; eliminating occupational segregation; and realising substantive equality in the labour market. The 2017 report highlighted concerns regarding the violence towards Māori women and is hoping to increase the prosecution rates of those who attack women, as well as impacts of racial discrimination and this impacts on Māori and Pasifika women.

Māori women had a voice in their tribe and were able to inherit land. Women who were members of chiefly families were viewed as sacred and often performed special ceremonies such as the karanga. Early European settlers generally thought that Māori women did not have power and only negotiated with men. When Europeans settled in the mid to late 19th century they brought with them their ideas about gender differences and inequalities that influenced laws, property rights, education and employment. Although Māori people are largely discriminated against as a whole, Maori women are the most heavily impacted by the gendered aspects of racial discrimination. Māori women are greatly impacted by their lack of access to employment and health and fear the violence that is inflicted upon many Māori women.

=== Prostitution ===
In June 2003, the Prostitution Reform Act was passed which decriminalised prostitution and New Zealand is recognised as having prostitution laws that protects the rights of people in the sex industry. Prior to the Prostitution Reform Act, prostitution was still prevalent in New Zealand societies and no change was found to have occurred in the size of the industry. Sex workers (many of whom are women) benefited from this law as it provides a level of protection from violence and discrimination.

== See also ==
- Feminism in New Zealand
- Human rights in New Zealand
- Māori people
- Prostitution in New Zealand
- Violence against women in New Zealand
- Women's history#Australia and New Zealand
- Women's suffrage in New Zealand
