= Violence against women in New Zealand =

Public health issue of violent acts against women

Violence against women in New Zealand is the use of domestic abuse, murder, sex trafficking, rape and assault against women in New Zealand. It has been recognised as a public health concern. Family violence and intimate partner violence (IPV) are common problems in New Zealand: the 2019 New Zealand Family Violence Study found that 55% of women have experienced one or more types of abuse from intimate partners, ranging from physical or sexual violence to psychological abuse, controlling behaviours or economic abuse, and the New Zealand Crime and Victims Survey found that women are 2.4 times more likely than men to experience intimate partner violence.

One in three women experience sexual assault in their lifetime. Family violence was estimated to cost the country up to $7 billion per year in 2014, while the cost of sexual violence was estimated at $6.9 billion per year in 2020. The violence is heavily gendered and often lethal: 74% of people killed by their partners between 2007 and 2021 were women, and 51% of all women who died from IPV between 2009 and 2018 were in the process of separating from their violent partner. Wāhine Māori are disproportionately affected, with 49% experiencing physical or sexual intimate partner violence in their lifetime. Most of this violence never reaches the justice system: 89.9% of sexual assault offences from 2018 to 2024 went unreported to Police, and of those that were reported between 2017 and 2023, only 42% resulted in court action and 12% in a conviction, meaning an estimated 4.2% of sexual assault victimisations result in charges and 1.2% in convictions.

== Incidence of violence against women ==
=== Sexual violence ===
1 in 3 women in New Zealand are estimated to have experienced physical and/or sexual violence from a partner in their lifetime. Further, sexual assault is considered to be a less serious crime compared to other forms of interpersonal violence, where only 15% of victims believed sexual assault was a crime according to the 2019 New Zealand Crime and Victims Survey (NZCVS).

In the 2009 New Zealand Crime and Safety Survey (NZCASS), publishing survey data on crime that took place in 2008, sexual offences accounted for 5% of all offences reported in the survey. The New Zealand Police recorded crime for reported sexual offences in 2008 accounted for 1% of all offences. In the NZCASS, 45% of people who had experienced sexual offences considered the incident a crime, 31% considered the incident ‘wrong, but not a crime’, and 23% considered the incident as ‘just something that happens’. Approximately one in four New Zealand women experience unwanted sexual contact in their lifetime, most often by someone known to them. In New Zealand in 2008 there were 607 prosecuted cases for rape, of which just 29% resulted in convictions, compared with the 68% conviction rate for all offences. A Ministry of Justice discussion paper exploring improvements to sexual violence legislation reported that around 90 percent of rapes go unreported. This makes it the least likely crime to be reported.

Of Police files coded as sexual violation of an adult between 1 July 2005 and 31 December 2007, 95% of victims were female, and of the identified perpetrators, 99% were male. In contrast, Police data for the 12 months to December 2024 shows that 80.4% of sexual assault victims were female, 13.3% were male, and 6.3% were of unspecified gender. In the same period, 97.3% of identified offenders were male. One reason for the decline in the proportion of female victims and male offenders is the effect of the Crimes Amendment Act 2005, which amended the Crimes Act to make all sexual offences gender-neutral. It also closed previous legal gaps in which certain female-on-male offences, including indecent assault and sexual conduct with a minor, had not been criminalised. As a result, offending by women is now more consistently recognised and prosecuted, especially in cases involving male victims.

=== Māori women ===
In February 2015 the New Zealand Ministry for Women released a report stating that Māori women are twice as likely as other New Zealand women to experience some form of violence.

A government report in 2021 reveals that half of wāhine Māori have experienced sexual or physical violence, with young people making up two-thirds of sexual assault victims. A new initiative called Te Hau Tangata, launched at Wharewātea Marae, seeks to address sexual harm and family violence. Led by Green Party co-leader Marama Davidson, the initiative adopts a whānau-led Te Ao Māori approach to transform the system. It aims to provide a safe platform for survivors to share their stories through anonymous feedback, community meetings, and family-led solutions, aiming to tackle long-standing issues of fragmented government agency efforts.

Autistic Woman

90% of Autistic woman experience sexual assualts and abuse. They are twice as likely to experience sexual violence.

Autism NZ identifies the problem as a lack of national safety course for Autisic woman.

In 2026, a Facebook page called NeuroReverse was started to bring awareness to the issue based on the lived experience of 5 late diagnosed AuDHD woman from state care abuse survivor circles.

=== Domestic violence ===
The Dunedin Multidisciplinary Health and Development Study, a longitudinal cohort study of 1037 people born in Dunedin during 1972–73, found that by age 21, 27 percent of female study members reported they had been physically abused by a partner and 22 percent of male study members reported they had perpetrated violence against their partner. However, in contradiction to many other reports, the Dunedin study also found higher rates of domestic violence against men than against women, with 34 percent of male study members reporting physical abuse by a partner and 37 percent of female study members reporting they had perpetrated violence against their partner.

Data is largely dependent upon reporting and recording practices, and is unlikely to accurately represent the incidence of domestic violence against women in New Zealand. In 2013, there were 6749 incidents of ‘male assaults female’ recorded by the New Zealand Police, and 2013 Protection Orders were granted by the Family Court. Ninety percent of respondents named in Protection Order applications were male. In 2013, the National Collective of Independent Women's Refuges received 81,720 crisis calls and 2940 women (and children) accessed safe house services.

In 2026 on the Facebook page NeuroReverse it was revealed Women's Refuge was contributing to the domestic and sexual violence of undiagnosed and diagnosed Autistic woman in New Zealand by relocating them to new cities, towns or countries, only so they could be targeted again due to the common personal safety issues Autism symptoms can cause.

== International Law ==
New Zealand's international treaty obligations require the state to submit periodic reports to the United Nations Human Rights Council under the Universal Periodic Review and to the Committee on the Elimination of Discrimination against Women. Under these obligations, New Zealand is required to uphold its commitments to international human rights, including women's rights, and is subject to the scrutiny and recommendations made by the periodic reviews.

=== Universal Periodic Review ===
New Zealand's Universal Periodic Review is conducted by the UN Human Rights Council and aims to improve the human rights situation of each of the 193 United Nations (UN) members and occurs every five years.

The national report submitted by New Zealand in 2013 identified the reduction of violence within families and its disproportionate impact upon women and children as a key priority of the New Zealand Government.

In the Report of the Working Group on the Universal Periodic Review for New Zealand, published in April 2014, mentioned the Government's commitment to eradicate the problem, including taking steps to reconvene the Family Violence Ministerial Group, the introduction of Police Safety Orders, expanding the definition of domestic violence to include economic and financial abuse, implementing the 2009 Action Plan for New Zealand Women, and implementation of recommendations on the Taskforce for Action on Sexual Violence. Included in the report were recommendations from seventeen other states suggesting measures for the reduction of violence against women in New Zealand. The New Zealand government accepted the majority of these recommendations and detailed the steps taken in carrying out the recommendations.

=== Committee on the Elimination of Discrimination against Women ===
Under New Zealand's CEDAW obligations, New Zealand is required to submit periodic reports on the implementation of CEDAW to the Committee on the Elimination of Discrimination against Women (the Committee). New Zealand's most recent periodic report on its obligations under CEDAW was in 2010/2011. Since 1989, it has been common practice for parties to CEDAW to include in their periodic reports to the Committee information on any legislation protecting women against all kinds of violence, measures adopted to eradicate violence, existence of support systems for women who are the victims of violence, and statistical data on women who are the victims of violence. Furthermore, in 2010 the scope of Article 2 of CEDAW was described to include a due diligence obligation on states to prevent discrimination by private actors.

==== Concluding observations of the Committee ====
In its concluding observations, issued in August 2012, the Committee expressed concern at "insufficient" statistical data on violence against Māori and migrant women, and women with disabilities.

== Organisations ==
The Ministry for Women is a government department that advises the government on women's economic independence, leadership, and safety from violence. The Ministry for Women in New Zealand provides research publications on issues effecting women, including violence against women generally and its effect on particular groups of women. New Zealand's international obligations in relation to the status of women are primarily managed by the Ministry of Women, and their role includes the promotion of consistency between international and domestic law protecting the interests and well-being of women.

The Women's Refuge is a community support service that provides crisis line support, information, planning services, and education and training programmers on the prevention of violence against women in New Zealand. Women's Refuge works to promote social discussion on domestic violence and to inform public debate.

== See also ==
- Domestic violence in New Zealand
- Human rights in New Zealand
- Violence against women
- Domestic violence
- Sexual violence
- Women in New Zealand
- Sexual Abuse Prevention Network
