= Roast Busters scandal =

2013 rape allegations in New Zealand

The Roast Busters scandal was a scandal in New Zealand involving a group of young men based in Auckland who were accused of intoxicating underage girls to gang rape them, and the police response (or perceived lack of response) to the complaints of alleged victims. Three members of the group, including those identified as Joseph Lavell Parker (son of Hollywood actor Anthony Ray Parker) and Beraiah Hales, after an 18 month investigation by detectives from across the country the investigation ended with no charges being laid, due to lack of evidence. The case has drawn reactions from the then Prime Minister (John Key), the Police Commissioner (Peter Marshall), the Minister of Police (Anne Tolley), several prominent media personalities in New Zealand, and the New Zealand public.

In December 2020, nearly a decade since the first allegations, NZ Police has reopened the case after a fresh complaint has been laid and arrested two of the men involved, with a warrant out for a third man who is overseas. In August 2023, two men were sentenced to home detention and given permanent name suppression.

== Investigation ==
The story initially broke due to reporting by 3 News (later known as Newshub) reporter Karen Rutherford on 3 November 2013. Police spokesmen claimed they had been aware of the group and had been monitoring their Facebook page for two years, but had not begun prosecution because no alleged victims had made formal statements or complaints. However, it was later reported that at least two alleged victims had gone to the police in 2011. One of the alleged victims made a formal complaint in 2011 when she was thirteen years old, and was quoted as saying the police "said that I didn't have enough evidence to show, because I went out in clothes that was pretty much asking for it. [...] I was asked a lot of questions about what I was wearing, and I went out in a skirt." She stated she was also asked to re-enact her sexual assault with dolls.

In that same month the media reported that several girls who alleged they were raped by the group made complaints to the police at least as early as 2011, despite initial claims that no such complaints had been filed: four girls had come forward in 2011 and 2012. The police continually stated there was insufficient evidence to prosecute, although they claimed they had warned members of the group to cease their activities. That same month one of the alleged victims made a second official complaint after claiming the police failed to act on her initial complaint two years before.

Police Commissioner Peter Marshall initially defended the police's treatment of the alleged victims and its handling of the case, but later acknowledged that the police misled the public on the details of the case and could have done a better job dealing with the investigation. Police Minister Anne Tolley has since asked the Independent Police Conduct Authority (IPCA) to review how the case was handled, citing concerns of police mishandling. On 11 December 2013, speaking at a parliamentary select committee in Wellington, Police Commissioner Peter Marshal admitted police failings over the handling of the case, acknowledging that the investigation and response "should have been sharper."

On 12 November 2013 the police appointed "a woman detective with significant experience in child sexual abuse cases to head the newly named Operation Clover", who was to lead a multi-agency probe into the case. The investigating team has asked possible victims and others who may have information into the group to come forward by calling a dedicated phone-line.

The mother of an alleged victim stated that the school which the young men and some of the alleged victims attended did nothing in response to complaints. In a statement to the press the principal claimed "she was aware of an incident at an out-of-school party which she was told about it [sic] in April 2012", and that the school at the time cooperated with police, but the alleged victim claimed she was bullied by one of the young men on school grounds.

Some friends of the group have since claimed the boasts are exaggerated and the group did not specifically target under-age girls. Friends of the group also claimed the behaviour of the young men was nothing more than normal teen antics. Despite official police complaints having been laid as early as 2011, several friends of the group have claimed that other girls did indeed give consent: in New Zealand it is an offence to have sexual contact with a person under the age of 16, and one alleged victim was 13 years old when she made an official complaint in December 2011.

The IPCA reported in March 2015 that the original 2011 police investigation had serious problems and basic police work on the matter was inadequate. The police decided that prosecutions would be inappropriate but the IPCA said the legal threshold for prosecution had been met, for example on charges of sexual activity with a person under the age of consent. Police officials admitted that the police work was of unacceptable standard and apologised to the women involved and their families.

Police spoke with more than 100 girls as part of the Operation Clover reinvestigation in 2013. The outcome was announced in 2014 following a 12 month review of the case.

== Media attention ==
The Roast Busters group and the alleged lack of police action came to prominent media attention in early November 2013 and sparked a national debate and attracted international attention.

On 16 November 2013 numerous protests were held across New Zealand's major cities in response to the group as well as police and media handling of the case. Protesters sought to speak out against rape culture, the police mishandling of the case, victim blaming, and inadequate funding for rape crisis centres and educational programmes set up focusing on consent, and rape prevention and awareness.

The matter has also featured heavily on talk back radio and political blogs, where the handling of the subject by John Tamihere and Willie Jackson sparked outrage, subsequently resulting in advertising boycotts and presenters being taken off air due to comments felt to be victim blaming. When speaking with an 18-year-old friend of an alleged victim of the group, who had launched rape complaints, the hosts referred to the group's actions as "mischief." Some felt John Tamihere and Willie Jackson implied that the alleged victims of gang rape were culpable when they claimed that young girls "should not be drinking anyway."

On 21 November 2013 a petition signed by over 111,000 people demanding stronger action over the Roast Busters scandal was handed over to the New Zealand Parliament. The petition also demanded better police support for victims of sexual assault and asked that the government to no longer strip back funding to sexual violence services.

In January 2019, an interview conducted with former Roast Busters ringleader Joseph Parker by Newshub was heavily criticised for reportedly re-traumatising the victims of the group's attacks, who had launched rape complaints against him. The ringleader described his place in the gang, as being an artist, saying "When you talk about the Roast Busters that is why I started Roast Busting. Why I even was a Roast Buster, to me it was a form of performing, it was an avenue of performing. It was kind of like a performance act in a lot of ways. You got treated like a performer, celebrated like a performer, celebrated like peers you get a lot of fruits that performers get, like is like...access to all types of...of all types of sinful treats [laughs] which is what I was indulging myself in... That is what drew me to pursuing the Roast Busters as hard as I pursued it."

== Renewed investigation ==
On 16 December, New Zealand Police arrested two men connected to the Roast Busters gang after a formal complaint of a sexual nature involving a person aged 12 to 16 in 2020 prompted an investigation. Police have also issued a warrant for a third man who is currently overseas. The accused pleaded not guilty. Their names have been suppressed. Additional charges were placed in March 2021 after a new complainant came forward. In August 2023, they were sentenced to home detention and given permanent name suppression.

== Name ==
The name of the group Roast Busters is assumed to be derived from the term "Spit roast", a euphemism for a sexual practice involving two males and one female, and to be a play on the title of the 1984 film Ghostbusters. Roast Busters Sandwich Ltd in the United Kingdom changed its name after its Facebook page filled with abuse.
