= List of King's and Queen's Counsel in New Zealand =

The office of King's Counsel was established in New Zealand in 1907. It recognises excellence in court advocacy and other outstanding contributions to the law in New Zealand. During the reign of a female sovereign, appointees are called Queen's Counsel. They are also informally called "silks", in reference to office holders being permitted to wear silk robes instead of standard wool and cotton robes and new appointees are described as "taking silk".

== Appointments as King's Counsel ==
Appointments in New Zealand are governed by the Lawyers and Conveyancers (Lawyers: King's Counsel) Regulations 2012. They are made by the Governor-General acting on behalf of the sovereign. Recommendations are made by the Attorney-General with concurrence by the Chief Justice. King's Counsel may be appointed at any time. The Attorney-General calls for applications from time to time, generally on annual basis, although ad hoc appointments are also made in special cases - generally in relation to the current Attorney-General or a current or incoming Solicitor-General. The Attorney-General is required to consult with the New Zealand Law Society and the New Zealand Bar Association prior to making a recommendation for appointment.

=== Criteria ===
The criteria for appointment of King’s Counsel are set out in the Guidelines for Candidates, published by Crown Law. The overarching requirement is excellence. Successful candidates possess qualities such as superior knowledge, skill in oral and written advoacy, leadership, contribution to the profession, promoting access to justice, and integrity and honesty. The rank is only available to those practising as barristers sole.

In addition to those practising as barristers who are appointed under the criteria set out in the regulations, the Governor-General is able to appoint King's Counsel under the Royal Prerogative based on their extraordinary contribution to the law. This is often for services to the government such as the Attorney-General, the Solicitor-General, or senior Parliamentary drafters, or for eminent legal academics. The fact that appointment is made under the prerogative is normally referred to in the announcement of the appointment. Unlike the United Kingdom, which has the rank of King's Counsel (Honoris Causa), there is no distinction between those in New Zealand appointed under the standard process and under the "extraordinary contribution" criterion following appointment.

== Name of the rank ==
During the reign of a male sovereign, appointees are called King's Counsel, and this applied from 1907 to 1952 during the reign of Edward VII (1907–1910), George V (1910–1936), Edward VIII (1936), and George VI (1936–1952). During Elizabeth II's reign (February 1952 – September 2022), new appointees were called Queen's Counsel. King's Counsel who were living when Elizabeth II became the monarch became Queen's Counsel. Forty-three King's Counsel had been appointed before 1952. When King Charles III ascended the throne on 9 September 2022 (New Zealand time), living Queen's Counsel automatically became King's Counsel.

In 2008, the Lawyers and Conveyancers Act (Lawyers: Senior Counsel and Queen's Counsel) Regulations 2008 were promulgated which provided for the appointment of Senior Counsel instead of Queen's Counsel from 2008 onwards, although existing Queen's Counsel retained the former designation. There was only one round of lawyers appointed as Senior Counsel, in 2008. The rank of Senior Counsel was open to lawyers practising in firms as well as at the Bar. The regulations were revoked and replaced from 1 February 2013 by the Lawyers and Conveyancers Act (Lawyers: Queen’s Counsel) Regulations 2012, which provided for reinstatement of the rank of Queen's Counsel and restriction to those practising at the independent bar. Those who had been appointed Senior Counsel were offered redesignation as Queen's Counsel, and all elected to do so. Those who had been appointed as Senior Counsel while practising in firms were permitted to continue to practise in firms without losing the rank. There were no appointments between 2009 and 2011, and the only apponintments in 2012 were those of the Attorney-General, Chris Finlayson, and the Solicitor-General, Mike Heron. 26 lawyers were appointed to the rank in the 2013 appointment round, which was (and remains) the largest number.

== Overview of office holders ==
Following the appointment round in October 2026, there have been 391 warrant holders. Of the 119 years since 1907 (as of 2026), there have been 42 years in which no appointments were made. There were no appointment rounds in 2020 and 2023, both being election years.

The first women appointed to the office were Sian Elias and Lowell Goddard in 1988.

=== Initial appointees ===
When the first ten appointments were made in June 1907 by Chief Justice Sir Robert Stout, two were from Auckland, four were from Wellington, two were from Christchurch, and two were from Dunedin. The first King's Counsel to die was Thomas Joynt on 5 September 1907, less than three months after his appointment; Joynt had been the senior member of the bar in the country.

== List of office holders ==
The following is a complete list of the office holders. This is based on the list published by the Crown Law Office in October 2026.

| Name | Portrait | Year appointed | Location |
|---|---|---|---|
| Frederick Baume | | 1907 | Auckland |
| Francis Bell | | 1907 | Wellington |
| Martin Chapman | | 1907 | Wellington |
| John Findlay | | 1907 | Wellington |
| John Hosking | | 1907 | Dunedin |
| Thomas Joynt | | 1907 | Christchurch |
| Charles Skerrett | | 1907 | Wellington |
| Saul Solomon | | 1907 | Dunedin |
| Walter Stringer | | 1907 | Christchurch |
| Joseph Tole | | 1907 | Auckland |
| John F. M. Fraser | | 1910 | Dunedin |
| Thomas Cotter | | 1911 | Auckland |
| Fred Earl | | 1912 | Auckland |
| Alexander Gray | | 1912 | Wellington |
| Charles Morison | | 1912 | Wellington |
| John Reed | | 1912 | Auckland |
| John Salmond | | 1912 | Wellington |
| George Raymond | | 1913 | Christchurch |
| Frederick Wilding | | 1913 | Christchurch |
| William MacGregor | | 1915 | Dunedin |
| Oliver Samuel | | 1919 | New Plymouth |
| Michael Myers | | 1922 | Wellington |
| Hubert Ostler | | 1925 | Auckland |
| Arthur Fair | | 1925 | Wellington |
| Thomas Wilford | | 1929 | Wellington |
| Alf Hanlon | | 1930 | Dunedin |
| Harold Johnston | | 1930 | Wellington |
| John Callan | | 1934 | Dunedin |
| Alexander Johnstone | | 1934 | Auckland |
| Claude Weston | | 1934 | Wellington |
| Henry Cornish | | 1934 | Wellington |
| Humphrey O'Leary | | 1935 | Wellington |
| Philip Cooke | | 1936 | Wellington |
| Wilfrid Sim | | 1939 | Christchurch |
| Herbert Evans | | 1946 | Wellington |
| Rex Mason | | 1946 | Auckland |
| John O'Shea | | 1946 | Wellington |
| Ossie Mazengarb | | 1947 | Wellington |
| Alfred North | | 1947 | Auckland |
| Alf Neill | | 1950 | Dunedin |
| Howard Richmond | | 1952 | Auckland |
| Leonard Leary | | 1952 | Auckland |
| Alexander Turner | | 1952 | Auckland |
| Clifton Webb | | 1954 | Auckland |
| Vincent Meredith | | 1957 | Auckland |
| Richard Wild | | 1957 | Wellington |
| Reginald Hardie Boys | | 1958 | Auckland |
| Lance Tompkins | | 1958 | Hamilton |
| Nigel Wilson | | 1958 | Auckland |
| Campbell Spratt | | 1961 | Wellington |
| Ronald Davison | | 1963 | Auckland |
| Robin Cooke | | 1964 | Wellington |
| Charles Hutchinson | | 1964 | Auckland |
| Edgar Bowie | | 1965 | Christchurch |
| David Beattie | | 1965 | Auckland |
| Muir Chilwell | | 1965 | Auckland |
| John White | | 1966 | Wellington |
| Peter Hillyer | | 1967 | Auckland |
| Frank O'Flynn | | 1968 | Wellington |
| Lloyd Brown | | 1968 | Auckland |
| Graham Crossley | | 1970 | Palmerston North |
| Laurie Southwick | | 1970 | Auckland |
| Richard Savage | | 1970 | Wellington |
| Paul Temm | | 1971 | Auckland |
| Peter Mahon | | 1971 | Christchurch |
| Maurice O'Brien | | 1971 | |
| Ian Barker | | 1973 | Auckland |
| Martyn Finlay | | 1973 | Auckland |
| Bob Edgley | | 1973 | |
| Bill Shires | | 1973 | Wellington |
| Stewart Lusk | | 1973 | |
| Edward Somers | | 1973 | Christchurch |
| David Tompkins | | 1974 | Hamilton |
| John Wallace | | 1974 | Auckland |
| Don Inglis | | 1976 | |
| Maxwell Vautier | | 1976 | |
| Brian McClelland | | 1976 | Christchurch |
| Robert Adams-Smith | | 1978 | |
| Rodney Gallen | | 1978 | |
| Thomas Eichelbaum | | 1978 | Wellington |
| Peter Penlington | | 1978 | Christchurch |
| Robert Smellie | | 1979 | Auckland |
| Colin Nicholson | | 1979 | Auckland |
| John Henry | | 1980 | Auckland |
| Paul Neazor | | 1981 | |
| Alan Houston | | 1981 | Hamilton |
| Anthony Hearn | | 1981 | Christchurch |
| Richard Craddock | | 1981 | Auckland |
| Edmund (Ted) Thomas | | 1981 | Auckland |
| Anthony (Tony) Ellis | | 1981 | Wellington |
| Simon Lockhart | | 1982 | Auckland |
| John Allen | | 1983 | Hamilton |
| Peter Salmon | | 1983 | Auckland |
| Barrie Atkinson | | 1983 | Christchurch |
| David Baragwanath | | 1983 | Auckland |
| Thomas Gault | | 1984 | Wellington |
| Andrew McGechan | | 1984 | Wellington |
| Anthony (Tony) Molloy | | 1984 | Auckland |
| Ralph Wylie | | 1985 | Christchurch |
| Colin Pidgeon | | 1985 | Auckland |
| Roderick Joyce | | 1985 | Auckland |
| Robert Fisher | | 1985 | Hamilton |
| Don Mathieson | | 1986 | Wellington |
| John Gibson | | 1986 | Wellington |
| Mike Bungay | | 1986 | |
| James Farmer | | 1986 | Auckland |
| Noel Anderson | | 1986 | Auckland |
| Alan Lough Hassall | | 1987 | Hamilton |
| Gerald Stewart Tuohy | | 1987 | Wellington |
| Peter Williams | | 1987 | Auckland |
| David Williams | | 1987 | Auckland |
| Alan Galbraith | | 1987 | Auckland |
| John McGrath | | 1987 | Wellington |
| Peter Jenkin | | 1988 | Wellington |
| Douglas White | | 1988 | Wellington |
| Sian Elias | | 1988 | Auckland |
| Colin Stuart Withnall | | 1988 | Dunedin |
| Lowell Goddard | | 1988 | Auckland |
| Michael Lance | | 1988 | |
| Hugh Williams | | 1988 | Palmerston North |
| Walter Iles | | 1989 | Wellington |
| John Laurenson | | 1989 | New Plymouth |
| Nigel Hampton | | 1989 | Christchurch |
| George Patterson Barton | | 1990 | Wellington |
| Stephen Pendrill Charles | | 1990 | Australia |
| Colin Carruthers | | 1990 | Wellington |
| Les Atkins | | 1990 | Palmerston North |
| John Fogarty | | 1990 | Christchurch |
| Paul Cavanagh | | 1991 | Auckland |
| John Upton | | 1991 | Wellington |
| Michael Camp | | 1991 | Wellington |
| Anthony (Tony) Lusk | | 1991 | Auckland |
| Julian Miles | | 1991 | Auckland |
| William Young | | 1991 | Christchurch |
| Robert Chambers | | 1992 | Auckland |
| Raynor Asher | | 1992 | Auckland |
| Bruce Squire | | 1992 | Wellington |
| Barry Paterson | | 1993 | Hamilton |
| John Wild | | 1993 | Wellington |
| John Haigh | | 1993 | Auckland |
| John Priestley | | 1994 | Auckland |
| Rodney Harrison | | 1994 | Auckland |
| Graham Panckhurst | | 1994 | Christchurch |
| Rhys Harrison | | 1994 | Auckland |
| John Francis Lyons | | 1994 | Australia |
| Frank Hortin Callaway | | 1994 | Australia |
| David Shavin | | 1994 | Australia |
| Kenneth Keith | | 1994 | Wellington |
| Chris McVeigh | | 1995 | Christchurch |
| Gary Judd | | 1995 | Auckland |
| Rodney Hansen | | 1995 | Auckland |
| Hugh Rennie | | 1995 | Wellington |
| Bradley Giles | | 1995 | Auckland |
| Michael Reed | | 1995 | Auckland |
| Judith Ablett-Kerr | | 1995 | Dunedin |
| Paul East | | 1995 | Rotorua |
| Charles Augustine Sweeney | | 1995 | Australia |
| Warwick Gendall | | 1996 | Wellington |
| Stuart Grieve | | 1996 | Auckland |
| Bill Wilson | | 1996 | Wellington |
| Tony Randerson | | 1996 | Auckland |
| Austin Forbes | | 1996 | Christchurch |
| Nick Davidson | | 1996 | Christchurch |
| John Billington | | 1996 | Wellington |
| Paul Davison | | 1996 | Auckland |
| Denese Bates | | 1996 | Auckland |
| Howard Keyte | | 1997 | Auckland |
| John Rowan | | 1997 | Whanganui |
| David Wilson | | 1997 | Hamilton |
| Lynton (Lyn) Stevens | | 1997 | Auckland |
| Terence Arnold | | 1997 | Wellington |
| Brendan Brown | | 1997 | Wellington |
| Helen Cull | | 1997 | Wellington |
| Kevin Ryan | | 1998 | Auckland |
| Christopher Hodson | | 1998 | Wellington |
| Ian Millard | | 1998 | Wellington |
| Royden Somerville | | 1998 | Dunedin |
| John Katz | | 1998 | Auckland |
| Tony Hughes-Johnson | | 1998 | Christchurch |
| Robert Dobson | | 1998 | Wellington |
| Ailsa Duffy | | 1998 | Auckland |
| Paul Heath | | 1998 | Hamilton |
| Mike Behrens | | 1999 | Palmerston North |
| Noel Ingram | | 1999 | Auckland |
| Rodger Haines | | 1999 | Auckland |
| Christopher (Kit) Toogood | | 1999 | Auckland |
| Kristy McDonald | | 1999 | Wellington |
| Tom Weston | | 1999 | Christchurch |
| Peter McKenzie | | 2000 | Wellington |
| Vivienne Ullrich | | 2000 | Wellington |
| David Collins | | 2000 | Wellington |
| Paul Mabey | | 2000 | Tauranga |
| David McGee | | 2000 | Wellington |
| Bruce Stewart | | 2000 | Auckland |
| Mark Cooper | | 2000 | Auckland |
| George Tanner | | 2002 | Wellington |
| Richard Clarke | | 2002 | Wellington |
| Peter Woodhouse | | 2002 | Auckland |
| Andrew Brown | | 2002 | Auckland |
| Donald Stevens | | 2002 | Wellington |
| Robert Fardell | | 2002 | Auckland |
| Edwin Wylie | | 2002 | Christchurch |
| Anne Hinton | | 2002 | Auckland |
| Mary Scholtens | | 2002 | Wellington |
| Maureen Southwick | | 2003 | Auckland |
| Grant Illingworth | | 2003 | Auckland |
| Philip Morgan | | 2003 | Hamilton |
| David Goddard | | 2003 | Wellington |
| Michael Ring | | 2004 | Auckland |
| Harry Waalkens | | 2004 | Auckland |
| Miriam Dean | | 2004 | Auckland |
| Francis Cooke | | 2004 | Wellington |
| Tómas Kennedy-Grant | | 2005 | Auckland |
| Helen Aikman | | 2005 | Wellington |
| David Jones | | 2005 | Auckland |
| John Burrows | | 2005 | Christchurch |
| Brian Keene | | 2006 | Auckland |
| Bruce Gray | | 2006 | Auckland |
| John Marshall | | 2007 | Wellington |
| Bruce Corkill | | 2007 | Wellington |
| Matthew Casey | | 2007 | Auckland |
| Stephen Mills | | 2007 | Auckland |
| Robert Lithgow | | 2007 | Wellington |
| Stephen Kós | | 2007 | Wellington |
| Chris Gudsell | | 2007 | Hamilton |
| Susan Hughes | | 2007 | New Plymouth |
| Nicholas Till | | 2007 | Christchurch |
| Deborah Chambers | | 2007 | Auckland |
| Campbell McLachlan | | 2007 | Wellington |
| Karen Clark | | 2007 | Wellington |
| Geoffrey Palmer | | 2008 | Wellington |
| David Heaney | | 2008 | Auckland |
| Murray Gilbert | | 2008 | Auckland |
| Jack Hodder | | 2008 | Wellington |
| Jan McCartney | | 2008 | Auckland |
| Simon Moore | | 2008 | Auckland |
| Christine Gordon | | 2008 | Auckland |
| Chris Finlayson | | 2012 | Wellington |
| Michael Heron | | 2012 | Auckland |
| Philip Hall | | 2013 | Christchurch |
| Terence Stapleton | | 2013 | Wellington |
| Richard Fowler | | 2013 | Wellington |
| Simon Jefferson | | 2013 | Auckland |
| Trevor Shiels | | 2013 | Dunedin |
| Paul Dacre | | 2013 | Auckland |
| Russell Fairbrother | | 2013 | Napier |
| Frances Joychild | | 2013 | Auckland |
| Nathan Gedye | | 2013 | Auckland |
| Peter Churchman | | 2013 | Wellington |
| Peter Watts | | 2013 | Auckland |
| Justin Smith | | 2013 | Wellington |
| Graham Kohler | | 2013 | Auckland |
| Matthew Muir | | 2013 | Auckland |
| Gillian Coumbe | | 2013 | Auckland |
| Les Taylor | | 2013 | Wellington |
| Kate Davenport | | 2013 | Auckland |
| Matthew Dunning | | 2013 | Auckland |
| Philip Skelton | | 2013 | Auckland |
| David Chisholm | | 2013 | Auckland |
| John Pike | | 2013 | Wellington |
| Christine Meechan | | 2013 | Auckland |
| Clive Elliott | | 2013 | Auckland |
| Jonathan Eaton | | 2013 | Christchurch |
| Daniel McLellan | | 2013 | Auckland |
| Neil Campbell | | 2013 | Auckland |
| Russell Bartlett | | 2014 | Auckland |
| Stephen Bonnar | | 2014 | Auckland |
| Paul David | | 2014 | Auckland |
| Marie Dyhrberg | | 2014 | Auckland |
| Antonia Fisher | | 2014 | Auckland |
| Paul Rishworth | | 2014 | Auckland |
| Paul Wicks | | 2014 | Auckland |
| Prudence Steven | | 2014 | Christchurch |
| Peter Whiteside | | 2014 | Christchurch |
| Anita Chan | | 2014 | Dunedin |
| David Laurenson | | 2014 | Auckland |
| Matthew McClelland | | 2014 | Wellington |
| Matthew Palmer | | 2014 | Wellington |
| Paul Radich | | 2014 | Wellington |
| Margaret Casey | | 2015 | Auckland |
| Mark O'Brien | | 2015 | Wellington |
| Richard Boast | | 2015 | Wellington |
| Derek Nolan | | 2016 | Auckland |
| Aaron Perkins | | 2016 | Auckland |
| Kieran Raftery | | 2016 | Auckland |
| David Bigio | | 2016 | Auckland |
| Jane Anderson | | 2016 | Auckland |
| Marc Corlett | | 2016 | Auckland |
| Vanessa Bruton | | 2016 | Auckland |
| Richard Raymond | | 2016 | Christchurch |
| John Prebble | | 2016 | Wellington |
| Kenneth Johnston | | 2016 | Wellington |
| Victoria Casey | | 2016 | Wellington |
| Una Jagose | | 2016 | Wellington |
| John Dixon | | 2017 | Auckland |
| Suzanne Robertson | | 2017 | Auckland |
| Rachael Reed | | 2017 | Auckland |
| Paul Borich | | 2017 | Auckland |
| Adam Ross | | 2017 | Auckland |
| Jenny Cooper | | 2017 | Auckland |
| Simon Mount | | 2017 | Auckland |
| Andrew Barker | | 2017 | Auckland |
| Greg Blanchard | | 2017 | Auckland |
| Campbell Walker | | 2017 | Auckland |
| Grant Brittain | | 2017 | Tauranga |
| James Every-Palmer | | 2017 | Wellington |
| Tony Angelo | | 2017 | Wellington |
| Vivienne Crawshaw | | 2018 | Auckland |
| Paul Dale | | 2018 | Auckland |
| Maria Dew | | 2018 | Auckland |
| Bob Hollyman | | 2018 | Auckland |
| Andru Isac | | 2018 | Wellington |
| Fiona Guy Kidd | | 2018 | Invercargill |
| James Rapley | | 2018 | Christchurch |
| Belinda Sellars | | 2018 | Auckland |
| Anne Stevens | | 2018 | Dunedin |
| James Wilding | | 2018 | Christchurch |
| Stephen Hunter | | 2019 | Auckland |
| Julie-Anne Kincade | | 2019 | Auckland |
| Simon Foote | | 2019 | Auckland |
| Janet McLean | | 2019 | Auckland |
| Nicolette Levy | | 2019 | Wellington |
| Karen Feint | | 2019 | Wellington |
| Len Andersen | | 2019 | Dunedin |
| Jonathan Temm | | 2019 | Rotorua |
| Lynda Kearns | | 2021 | Auckland |
| Stephen McCarthy | | 2021 | Auckland |
| Ron Mansfield | | 2021 | Auckland |
| Laura O'Gorman | | 2021 | Auckland |
| Fletcher Pilditch | | 2021 | Auckland |
| Davey Salmon | | 2021 | Auckland |
| Greg Arthur | | 2021 | Wellington |
| Michael Colson | | 2021 | Wellington |
| Victoria Heine | | 2021 | Wellington |
| Kerryn Beaton | | 2021 | Christchurch |
| Catherine Cull | | 2022 | Northland |
| Bronwyn Carruthers | | 2022 | Auckland |
| Nicholas Chisnall | | 2022 | Auckland |
| David Cooper | | 2022 | Auckland |
| Tiffany Cooper | | 2022 | Auckland |
| Jason Goodall | | 2022 | Auckland |
| Simon Mitchell | | 2022 | Auckland |
| Andrew Butler | | 2022 | Wellington |
| Stephanie Grieve | | 2022 | Christchurch |
| Lisa Preston | | 2022 | Christchurch |
| Judith Collins | | 2023 | Auckland |
| Philip Joseph | | 2024 | Christchurch |
| Philip Shamy | | 2024 | Christchurch |
| Todd Simmonds | | 2024 | Auckland |
| Robert Stewart | | 2024 | Auckland |
| Garry Williams | | 2024 | Auckland |
| Zane Kennedy | | 2024 | Auckland |
| Kelly Quinn | | 2024 | Auckland |
| Katherine Anderson | | 2024 | Auckland |
| Wendy Aldred | | 2024 | Wellington |
| Timothy Stephens | | 2024 | Wellington |
| Douglas Ewen | | 2024 | Wellington |
| Anne Toohey | | 2024 | Christchurch |
| Sarah Armstrong | | 2024 | Auckland |
| Christopher Stevenson | | 2024 | Wellington |
| Daniel Kalderimis | | 2024 | Wellington |
| Alanya Limmer | | 2024 | Christchurch |
| Sally Gepp | | 2024 | Nelson |
| Samuel Wimsett | | 2024 | Auckland |
| Nura Taefi | | 2024 | Auckland |
| Richard Marchant | | 2025 | Auckland |
| Alan Webb | | 2025 | Auckland |
| Brian Dickey | | 2025 | Auckland |
| Paul Keegan | | 2025 | New Plymouth |
| Cassandra Nicholson | | 2025 | Wellington |
| Simon Ladd | | 2025 | Auckland |
| Balthazar Matheson | | 2025 | Auckland |
| Tiana Epati | | 2025 | Gisborne |
| Kevin Glover | | 2025 | Auckland |
| Sarah Jerebine | | 2025 | Auckland |
| Katie Hogan | | 2025 | Auckland |
| Matthew Smith | | 2025 | Wellington |
| Anna Adams | | 2026 | Auckland |
| Matanuku Mahuika | | 2026 | Gisborne |
| Karen Radich | | 2026 | Wellington |
| Janette Campbell | | 2026 | Auckland |
| Matthew Harris | | 2026 | Auckland |
| Kirsten Gray | | 2026 | Christchurch |
| Tim Smith | | 2026 | Wellington |
| Polly Pope | | 2026 | Auckland |
| Kerry Cook | | 2026 | Christchurch |
| Sam Lowery | | 2026 | Auckland |
| Rob Kirkness | | 2026 | Wellington |
| Isaac Hikaka | | 2026 | Auckland |
| Annabel Maxwell-Scott | | 2026 | Auckland |
