= Deborah Chambers =

New Zealand King's Counsel (born 1961)

Lady Chambers KC
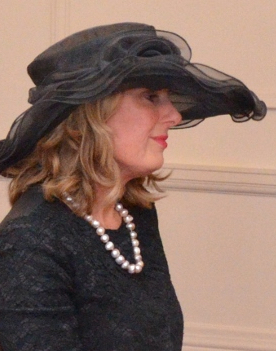
- Chambers in 2013
- Born: Deborah Anne Tohill; 22 March 1961 (age 65); North Shore, New Zealand
- Education: University of Auckland
- Occupations: Relationship property and trust lawyer King's Counsel
- Spouse: Sir Robert Chambers (m. 2004; died 2013)

Deborah Anne, Lady Chambers KC (née Tohill; born 22 March 1961) is a New Zealand King's Counsel specialising in relationship property and trusts law. She was married to the New Zealand Supreme Court judge Sir Robert Chambers from 2004 until his death in 2013.

== Personal life ==
Born on the North Shore in Auckland on 22 March 1961, Chambers grew up in the working-class suburb of Glenfield in a State Advances house. She attended Takapuna Primary School, Carmel College and Auckland Metropolitan College, an alternative state school. She graduated from the University of Auckland in 1982 with a BA/LLB.

She married Charles Hollings in 1987, and the couple had two children. In 2004, she married Justice Robert Chambers of the New Zealand Court of Appeal, and became a step-mother to his two sons. Justice Chambers was appointed as a Supreme Court judge in 2012. He died suddenly on 21 May 2013 as a result of a brain aneurism. He was made a Knight Companion of the New Zealand Order of Merit in the 2013 Queen's Birthday Honours, but as royal assent was given to the appointment before his death, the knighthood took effect from 20 May 2013. Deborah Chambers sponsors the annual Justice Sir Robert Chambers Memorial Moot held by at the University of Auckland Law School.

In 2015, Chambers' eldest step-son, David, commenced legal proceedings against the executors of his father's estate seeking greater provision than provided in his father's will. David's claims in regard to removing Chambers and her fellow executor, the family solicitor, were unsuccessful. He was also unsuccessful in seeking to impose a constructive trust.

== Legal career ==
After graduation, she worked as a solicitor at Butler White & Hannah, a Crown prosecutor at Meredith Connell, and a solicitor at Russell McVeagh MacKenzie Bartleet & Co. She also spent a year in Glasgow, Scotland, as a procurator fiscal depute prosecuting crime.

In 1989, she went to the bar joining Shortland Chambers. In 1994 she appeared with Alan Galbraith QC in the Privy Council acting for Richard Prebble, then Minister of State-Owned Assets in Prebble v Television New Zealand Ltd. In 2007, she joined Bankside Chambers and was appointed a Queen's Counsel the same year. She is described as a "divorce guru" and "the Divorce Queen".

Chambers has been counsel in many significant equity, trust and relationship property cases in New Zealand. She advocated for broadening the definition of "property" to include for example a spouse or partner's enhanced earning capacity in Z v Z and for better recognition of economic disparity in cases like M v B on behalf of traditional wives. More recently, she acted as counsel for the wife in Clayton v Clayton. The decisions of the Court of Appeal and Supreme Court in that case rewrote the landscape in regard to trust law in New Zealand.

Chambers has consistently been placed on the power list of New Zealand’s lawyers, most recently as the 42nd most powerful lawyer in the country and the only female QC in private practice to be listed in the 2022 power list.

In all recent years including 2024, Chambers was ranked as the high net worth barrister at the New Zealand Bar in regard to the handling of relationship property and trust litigation matters generally and of high profile divorce cases in particular. She held that position at both the Global and Asia-Pacific Chambers and Partners Guide with the Guide spotlighting her achievements as including multi-jurisdictional aspects and attracting “especially favourable notice”. The Chambers Guide noted that interviewees widely acknowledge her to be a preeminent practitioner in her field, one source unhesitatingly calling her "the very top relationship property lawyer in the country" and adding "she is a fearless advocate, unflinching in her dedication to advancing her client’s case." In March 2022, 2023 and 2024 she was listed as the Leading Family and Relationship Property Law Barrister in Doyles Guide.

== Publications ==
- For Richer For Poorer (CCH, 2001).
- Of Gold Diggers and Possums – Section 15 of the Property (Relationships) Act 1976 (paper presented to the New Zealand Law Society Conference, October 2001).
- The quantum of economic disparity [2010] NZLJ 366.
- Co-author New Zealand Master Trusts Guide (CCH, 2011).
- “Hunger Games – Weapons for a game of Trusts” (paper presented to the New Zealand Law Society Trusts Conference, June 2013).
- “Baby, Baby, Baby, Where did our trust go?” (paper presented to the International Family Law Conference, Queenstown, September 2015).
- “Simple policy changes could help close pay gap” (NZ Herald, 30 March 2016).
- "Baby, where did our rights go?" (NZ Herald, 22 February 2022).
- "Royal Commission Covid inquiry: David Seymour, Winston Peters right about scrapping it" (NZ Herald, 21 December 2023).
