= Bell Gully =

New Zealand law firm

- Headquarters: Auckland
- No. of offices: 2
- No. of attorneys: 200+
- No. of employees: 400+
- Major practice areas: General Practice
- Key people: Torrin Crowther (Chair)
- Date founded: 1840
- Website: www.bellgully.com

Bell Gully is a major New Zealand law firm. Founded in 1840 it is one of New Zealand's largest law firms, and along with Chapman Tripp and Russell McVeagh it is considered to be one of the "big three".

Bell Gully is a full-service law firm. Major practice areas include corporate, financial services, property, tax and litigation, and the firm is capable of acting on large and complex commercial matters.

With offices in Auckland and Wellington, the firm has about 400 staff.

== History ==
Bell Gully is the result of a merger between Bell Gully & Co of Wellington, founded in 1860, and Buddle Weir & Co of Auckland, founded in 1840.

Over the years, the firm has produced many leading lawyers, including four of the twelve first presidents of the New Zealand Law Society (Sir Francis Bell, Sir Humphrey O'Leary, A. B. Buxton, and Sir Denis Blundell), two solicitors-general (Herbert Edgar Evans and Sir Richard Wild), four attorneys-general, three chief justices (Michael Myers, Sir Humphrey O'Leary, and Sir Richard Wild), numerous High Court and Court of Appeal judges, two prime ministers and a governor-general.

== Community support ==
Bell Gully is recognised for its community support. Bell Gully was named a winner at the 2019 NZ UN Women's Empowerment Principles White Camellia Awards. The firm received an award in recognition of its work to promote education, training and professional development opportunities for women.

Bell Gully is certified with the Rainbow Tick and is a signatory of the New Zealand Law Society's Gender Equality Charter. The firm is also an active member of Diversity Works NZ and a supporting partner of Global Women NZ.

Each year, Bell Gully supports a variety of individuals, charities and organisations through its Pro Bono and Community Programme. Examples of the organisations Bell Gully supports include the Auckland and Wellington City Missions, Shine, Plunket, Habitat for Humanity and KidsCan. For the last 10 years the firm has contributed close to NZ$1 million per year in pro bono support to its clients.

== International rankings ==
Bell Gully is regularly ranked as one of New Zealand's leading law firms. The firm holds top-tier Chambers rankings across Banking & Finance, Competition/Antitrust, Corporate/Commercial, Dispute Resolution, Employment, Energy & Natural Resources, Public Law, Real Estate and Tax.

Bell Gully is the only New Zealand law firm to have a partner ranked in Chambers Global as a leading lawyer for climate change work.

Bell Gully is also the only New Zealand law firm to be ranked in the top tier of both International Tax Review's (ITR) World Tax 2020 and World Transfer Pricing 2020.

Global Competition Review's GCR 100 has recognised Bell Gully as having an 'elite' competition practice for the past 16 years, its highest ranking in New Zealand.
