= Anna Adams =

Anna Adams may refer to:

- Anna Adams (poet) (1926–2011), English poet and artist
- Anna Adams (lawyer), New Zealand lawyer and solicitor-general

== See also ==
- Anna Adams Gordon (1853–1931), American social reformer and songwriter
- Anne Adams (born 1960), Welsh swimmer
- Ann Adams (1926–1992), American artist
