= Jenny Cooper (lawyer) =

New Zealand lawyer and KC

Jennifer Cooper KC is a corporate lawyer and King's Counsel from New Zealand.

Cooper attended the University of Otago in Dunedin, New Zealand, graduating with a BA and LLB (Hons). She attended the University of Oxford as a Rhodes Scholar and completed a BCL (first class) and MPhil in international relations.

Cooper was admitted to the bar in 1995 and worked for the UK Foreign and Commonwealth Office from 1998 to 2002, including holding the position of Second Secretary at the British Embassy in The Hague. In 2003 she returned to New Zealand. She works in company and securities law, fair trading and consumer finance law, competition law, and insolvency. Cooper also serves on the council of the New Zealand Bar Association. She was appointed a Queen's Counsel in 2017. As of 2020, she is the president of Lawyers for Climate Action NZ.

== See also ==
- List of King's and Queen's Counsel in New Zealand
