= Environmental movement in New Zealand =

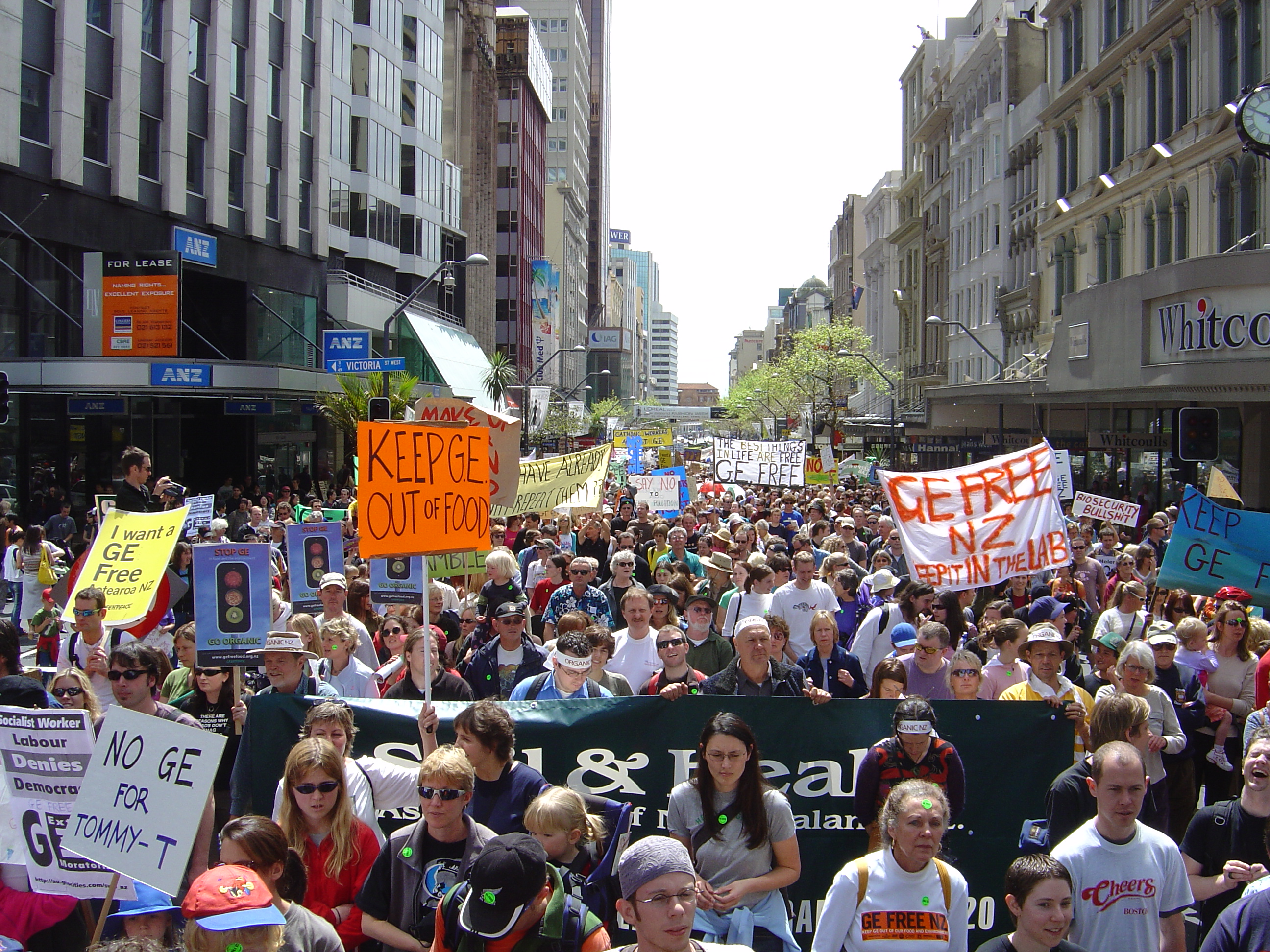
Part of a protest march held in 2003 voicing opposition to genetic engineering, making its way up Queen St, a main thoroughfare of Auckland

The environmental movement in New Zealand started in the 1950s, a period of rapid social change. Since then multiple high-profile national campaigns have contested various environmental issues including forest protection, transport decarbonisation, and coal mining. The environmental movement eventually spawned the Values Party, which was the first political party with a strong focus on environmental issues to contest national elections. The Values Party eventually morphed into the Green Party of Aotearoa New Zealand.

Environmental organizations in New Zealand work in different ways to protect nature. Some focus on public campaigns and protests, while others work on environmental laws, research and government policies. For example, Forest & Bird has been involved in conversation since 1923, including campaigns to protect native forests and wildlife. The Environmental Defence Society focuses more on environmental law and policy, while Greenpeace is known for its environmental campaigns and direct action.

== Beginnings ==
A number of commentators consider that the earliest major environmental issue in New Zealand was the national campaign to prevent the raising of the levels of Lakes Manapouri and Te Anau as part of stage two of the development of the Manapouri Power Project. A "Save Manapouri Campaign" ran from 1959 through to 1962, involving organisations such as the Forest and Bird Protection Society and the Scenery Preservation Society, resulting in two petitions to parliament and the formation of the Nature Conservation Council, a government advisory body. The "Save Manapouri Campaign", which commenced in Invercargill in October 1969, became a national campaign in 1970 with a third petition to parliament, a Cabinet Committee report and a Commission of Inquiry. The Save Manapouri debate lasted until the 1972 general election, when the incoming Kirk administration promised not to raise the levels of either Lakes Manapouri and Te Anau, establishing instead the Guardians of Lakes Manapouri and Te Anau to ensure that both lakes would be operated within their natural levels.

Certainly the Save Manapouri Campaign occurred during a time of heightened international concern for the popular concept of the 'environment', but it was neither the first – nor the last – of a succession of campaigns to preserve aspects of New Zealand's natural heritage dating back to the creation of the first scenic reserves and national parks. Earlier 'scenery preservation' campaigns, such as the Waipoua Forest debate, when the Waipoua Preservation Society, campaigned against the government's plans in 1946 to log the Waipoua Forest, included multiple recognisable elements of later 'environmental' campaigns – appeals to public opposition to the loss of natural landscapes, petitions and on-site consideration of the potential impacts of logging. What was different by 1969, therefore, was the sophistication of the conservation/environmental debate, which was able to use the new international lexicon of 'environmentalism' to describe those tangible and intangible features of the Manapouri landscape, which were threatened by the power project.

== History ==
=== Forest campaigns in the 1970s and 1980s ===
In October 1971, the government proposed cutting large areas of lowland beech forest in the South Island to supply pulp mills. At that time, Forest and Bird was the only environmental group in New Zealand that worked mainly on forests. The plan led to the creation of new groups, including the Beech Forest Action Committee, which later became the Native Forests Action Council.

On 4 July 1975, the Native Forests Action Council produced the Maruia Declaration. It asked the government to protect native forests by law and to stop logging them. It was first a public petition and was given to the government in 1977. Protests against logging native forest continued between 1975 and 1985.

In 1978, protesters at Pureora Forest in the central North Island climbed into the trees and lived on platforms to stop logging. The forest is home to the rare kōkako. Logging at Pureora stopped in 1982. Similar protests took place at Whirinaki and Ōkārito.

=== Anti-nuclear movement and the Rainbow Warrior ===
Greenpeace campaigned against French nuclear testing at Mururoa Atoll in the Pacific.

On 10 July 1985, two bombs sank the Greenpeace ship Rainbow Warrior at Marsden Wharf in Auckland. The photographer Fernando Pereira was killed. The ship had arrived in Auckland a few days earlier to lead a group of boats to Mururoa to protest against French nuclear tests. French secret service agents carried out the attack. Prime Minister David Lange called it an act of state-backed terrorism. Two French agents were sentenced to ten years in prison for manslaughter in November 1985.

The bombing made many New Zealanders more strongly opposed to nuclear weapons. On 8 June 1987, Parliament passed the New Zealand Nuclear Free Zone, Disarmament and Arms Control Act. It banned nuclear-armed and nuclear-powered ships from New Zealand waters and nuclear weapons from its land. France stopped its nuclear testing in the Pacific in 1996.

In 1986, the government and environmental groups agreed to the West Coast Forest Accord. Under this agreement, 180,000 hectares of native forest were protected and 120,000 hectares were kept for logging. Some protesters did not accept the deal. A tree-sitting protest in 1990 led to the end of logging native trees. Whanganui National Park (1986) and Paparoa National Park (1987) were created in the same period. In 1989, most state-owned native forests passed to the new Department of Conservation.

== Environmental Law Reform ==
The Resource Management Act 1991 (RMA) was New Zealand's main law for managing land, air, water and the coast. It was the result of a long reform process in the 1980s. The Resource Management Bill was introduced to Parliament in December 1989, but the Labour government lost the 1990 election before it was passed.

The RMA was changed many times over the following decades. In October 2024, the Resource Management (Freshwater and Other Matters) Amendment Act came into force. A second amendment, about consenting, became law in August 2025.

In March 2025, the Cabinet agreed to replace the RMA with two new laws. The government said the new laws would cut red tape, help the economy grow and improve environmental results. The Planning Bill covers how land can be used and developed. The Natural Environment Bill covers the use and protection of the natural environment. Both bills were introduced in December 2025, and a select committee finished its review in July 2026.

Parliament passed both bills on 22 September 2026. The new system will start in stages and is expected to be fully working by 2030.

== Māori and the Environment ==
Kaitiakitanga (guardianship) is a Māori way of looking after the environment. It is based on the idea that people are part of the natural world. A kaitiaki (guardian) can be a person or a group that cares for a place such as a lake or a forest. Local iwi (tribes) give them this role. The idea has been included in some New Zealand laws, including the Resource Management Act 1991. Some iwi have also used it in their own work. For example, four iwi came together to stop pollution in the Manawatū River.

Since 2014, three Treaty of Waitangi settlements have made natural places legal persons. The first was Te Urewera, a former national park in the North Island. The Te Urewera Act 2014 was signed into law on 27 July 2014. It ended the national park and made Te Urewera a legal entity, with the rights, powers, duties and liabilities of a legal person. A board speaks for Te Urewera. After the first three years it has six members chosen by Tūhoe and three chosen by the Crown, and the chair is always a Tūhoe member.

The Te Awa Tupua (Whanganui River Claims Settlement) Act 2017 was signed on 20 March 2017. It made the Whanganui River a legal person. Two people, one chosen by the Crown and one by Whanganui iwi, act for the river as Te Pou Tupua.

In January 2025, Parliament passed a law that made Taranaki Maunga and its nearby peaks a legal person called Te Kāhui Tupua. A group called Te Tōpuni Kōkōrangi speaks for it. Four of its members are chosen by the Minister of Conservation and four by iwi. The national park, now called Te Papa-Kura-o-Taranaki, is still a national park managed by the Department of Conservation.

== Climate Movement ==
Climate change became a major issue for the environmental movement in the late 2010s. Extinction Rebellion began its actions in New Zealand in April 2019.

On 15 March 2019, tens of thousands of students marched in towns and cities around New Zealand as part of School Strike 4 Climate. They asked the government to pass a Zero Carbon Act with a plan to reach carbon neutrality by 2050. On 27 September 2019, the organisers said about 170,000 people joined the third strike. Adults joined the students this time, and many businesses closed for the day.

In November 2019, Parliament passed the Climate Change Response (Zero Carbon) Amendment Act. The law sets a target of net zero emissions by 2050 for all greenhouse gases except biogenic methane. For biogenic methane, the target is to cut emissions by 24 to 47 per cent below 2017 levels by 2050. On 2 December 2020, Parliament passed a motion declaring a climate emergency. The government also promised to make the public sector carbon neutral by 2025.

Some campaigners have also used the courts. In 2019, Mike Smith, the climate change spokesperson for the Iwi Chairs Forum, took legal action against several major New Zealand companies over their greenhouse gas emissions. In February 2024, the Supreme Court said his claims could go to trial. In May 2026, the government announced it would change the law to stop courts from finding people liable in tort for the climate effects of emissions. The Climate Change Response (Tort Liability) Amendment Act 2026 came into force on 25 August 2026 and applies to existing cases, including Smith's. The government said Parliament, not the courts, should decide how New Zealand responds to climate change. Some legal commentators said the change removed a way to hold large emitters to account.

== Community Conservation and Predator Free 2050 ==
Community groups and private landowners have long taken part in conservation in New Zealand. The Queen Elizabeth II National Trust, set up in 1977, lets landowners protect land or forest with special conservation value by signing a contract.

In July 2016, the government announced a goal to remove rats, stoats and possums from New Zealand by 2050. The plan depends on community groups. In September 2025, the Department of Conservation (DOC) said there were more than 9,000 community trapping projects and 20 large landscape projects. In Dunedin, more than 1,000 people trap pests in the town and the countryside. Since 2018, they have removed more than 60,000 possums, 20,000 rats and 2,000 mustelids. On Rakiura / Stewart Island, DOC, Zero Invasive Predators and Te Rūnanga o Ngāi Tahu are working with the local community to remove predators from about 175,000 hectares. DOC says this is the largest attempt of its kind.

In May 2025, the government announced in its Budget that it would close Predator Free 2050 Limited, a Crown company set up in 2016 to support large predator projects. Its work moved to DOC. The Minister of Conservation, Tama Potaka, said this would reduce double work, and the government expected to save $12.6 million over four years. Critics were worried that the change would undo progress on removing predators. In November 2025, Potaka said feral cats would be added to the list of target species. They had not been included before. A new strategy for 2026–2030 was launched in March 2026. It aims to remove rats, mustelids, possums and feral cats.

== Campaigns ==
Other major issues have included nuclear energy, preventing native forest logging and halting the growing of genetically engineered (GE) food crops. Logging protests occurred in Whirinaki, Pureora, and on the West Coast of the South Island.

As of 2010 the environmental movement is active in multiple areas, including opposition to new large-scale hydro dams, protecting conservation land from mining and preventing overuse of water resources.

== Organisations ==
The largest conservation organisation, formed in 1923, is Forest and Bird. Greenpeace New Zealand carries out advocacy and direct action in and around New Zealand. Environment and Conservation Organisations of Aotearoa New Zealand (ECO) is an umbrella organisation of about 50 environmental organisations.

The Environmental Law Initiative (ELI) is a charity set up in 2020 in Christchurch, focused on taking litigation on environmental issues. Their first successful case was over crayfish catch limits in Northland, where they claimed crayfish were functionally extinct due to kina barrens, and the minister had failed to account for this is in setting the catch limits. The case was taken in conjunction with Te Uri O Hikihiki hapū. Another case revolved around water pollution, nitrate levels and water regulation in Canterbury. In 2026, they joined with Climate Action NZ to challenge the government's Emissions Reduction Plan, which they claimed relied too much on tree-planting at the expense of reductions in emissions.

Other groups include Lawyers for Climate Action NZ, set up in 2019 to encourage New Zealand to take more ambitious actions to meet its Paris Agreement commitments..

== See also ==
- Timeline of the New Zealand environment
- Conservation in New Zealand
- Environment of New Zealand
