= Chamberlains v Lai =

New Zealand law case

- Court: Supreme Court of New Zealand
- Full case name: Chamberlains v Sun Poi Lai & Hilda Lorraine Lai
- Decided: 11 September 2006
- Transcript: http://jdo.justice.govt.nz/jdo/SearchResult.jsp

Court membership
- Judges sitting: Elias, Gault, Keith, Tipping, Thomas

Keywords
- barristerial immunity

Chamberlains v Lai [2006] NZSC 70, is an important case which lifted "barristerial immunity" in New Zealand as a defence to negligence claims against barristers for their actions in both civil and criminal proceedings, which had been a feature of New Zealand since the early 1970s.

== Background ==
Chamberlains (a law firm) represented the Lais' horticulture company, S and L Lai Limited, in defending a claim for breach of fiduciary duty heard in the High Court of New Zealand by Blanchard J, during November 1995. Near the end of the trial, the judge asked Mr and Mrs Lai whether they would personally guarantee the judgement if their company lost in court, a stipulation they agreed to after obtaining the advice of their lawyer, an employee of Chamberlains.

Unfortunately for the Lais, their company eventually lost in court, and judgement was entered against not only the company, but also against both of the Lais personally as well.

Subsequently, the Lais sued Chamberlains for negligence in contract and in tort, as well breach of fiduciary duty, for which Chamberlains filed a defence of "barristerial immunity". Salmon and Laurenson JJ heard the new case as a full bench of the High Court, ultimately deciding that they were bound to uphold the validity of the defence due to precedent set by the New Zealand Court of Appeal.

The Lais appealed to the New Zealand Court of Appeal and won by a 4–1 majority, Anderson P dissenting. Chamberlains subsequently filed an appeal with the Supreme Court of New Zealand.

== Judgment ==
The Supreme Court of New Zealand struck out the defence of "barristerial immunity" in Chamberlains v Lai [2006] NZSC 70, meaning the Lai's were able to sue their lawyers for damages on an action in negligence. This was based on the earlier decision by the UK House of Lords in Arthur J S Hall & Co (a firm) v Simons [2002] 3 All ER 673. This means that any barrister or solicitor before a Court in New Zealand may be liable in negligence for their actions. Despite being a civil case, the court held the ruling would apply to barristers both in civil and criminal proceedings, to avoid what was described in the principal judgement as "incongruity [that] would be exacerbated by the difficulties of classification of proceedings as civil or criminal".

A key issue in this case was whether the striking out of immunity would interfere with finality in the court system. Overall, it was held that existing court powers relating to abuse of process would be sufficient to rein in any discrepancies. It was also held that the lawyer's duty to the court would remain paramount, and the striking out of immunity would not place an undue emphasis on the interests of the client. Elias CJ, in the majority opinion, described the duty to the court as the "rules by which the litigation must be conducted."

The majority opinion was delivered by Elias CJ on behalf of Keith and Gault JJ. Concurrences were delivered by Tipping J and Thomas J.
