= Frederick Fitchett =

New Zealand politician

Frederick Fitchett CMG
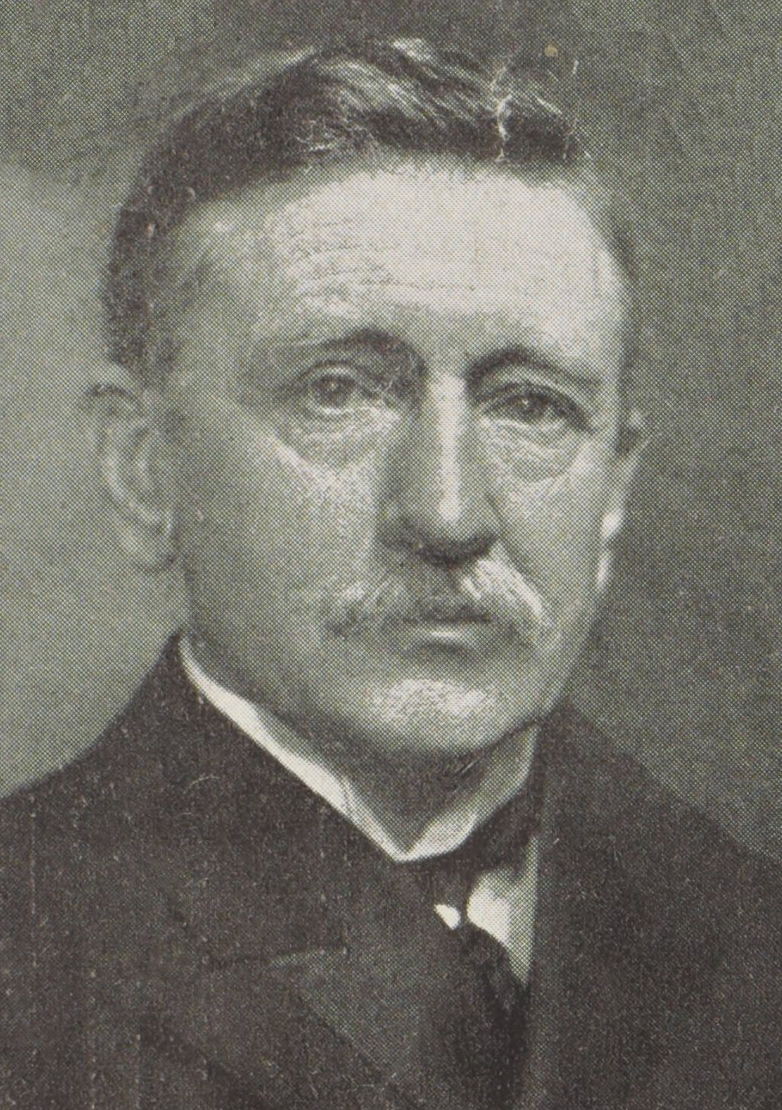

Member of the New Zealand Parliament for Dunedin Central
- In office 1887–1890
- Preceded by: Thomas Bracken
- Succeeded by: Constituency abolished

Solicitor-General of New Zealand
- In office 1901–1910
- Preceded by: Walter Scott Reid
- Succeeded by: John Salmond

New Zealand Public Trustee
- In office 1910–1917
- Preceded by: Joseph William Poynton
- Succeeded by: Robert Triggs

Personal details
- Born: 1851 Grantham, Lincolnshire, England
- Died: 5 October 1930 (aged 79) Auckland, New Zealand
- Party: Independent
- Spouse: Lina Valerie Blain (m. 1890)
- Profession: Barrister

Frederick Fitchett CMG (1851 – 5 October 1930) was a 19th-century member of parliament from Dunedin, New Zealand.

== Biography ==
New Zealand Parliament
Years	Term	Electorate	Party
1887–1890	10th	Dunedin Central	Independent

Born in 1851 in Grantham, Lincolnshire, England, Fitchett was educated at the University of Melbourne and Canterbury University College, Christchurch, graduating Bachelor of Arts in 1879 and Master of Arts in 1880. He was admitted to the Bar the following year, and began practising law in Dunedin. In 1887 he was conferred with an LLD from Canterbury.

Fitchett represented the Dunedin Central electorate from 1887 to 1890, when he retired. In 1890 he was the junior opposition whip. In 1890 Fitchett visited London, where he married Lina Valerie Blain at St Simon's Church, Cadogan Square, on 16 April. The couple had one son.

In 1895 Fitchett was appointed as the parliamentary draughtsman and assistant Crown law officer. He served as solicitor-general from 1901 to 1910, and represented New Zealand at the 1907 conference of French, British and colonial representatives that considered the New Hebrides question. He was appointed public trustee in 1910, and remained in that role until his retirement in 1917. In the 1911 Coronation Honours Fitchett was appointed a Companion of the Order of St Michael and St George.

Fitchett was a member of the senate of the University of New Zealand from 1883 until 1915. He died in Auckland on 5 October 1930, and his ashes were buried at Waikumete Cemetery.

== Notes ==
New Zealand Parliament
Preceded by Thomas Bracken	Member of Parliament for Dunedin Central; 1887–1890	In abeyance Title next held by John A. Millar
