= Miriam Dean =

New Zealand Queen's Counsel

Miriam Dean CNZM KC
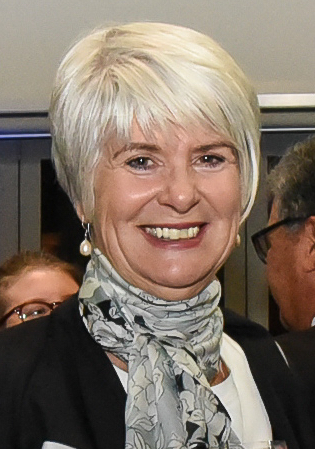
- Education: Harvard Law School, University of Auckland, University of Waikato
- Awards: King's Counsel, Companion of the New Zealand Order of Merit, Distinguished Alumni

Miriam Rose Dean CNZM KC is a New Zealand King's Counsel and company director. In 2011 Dean was appointed a Companion of the New Zealand Order of Merit for services to the law and business. She was awarded Distinguished Alumna status at the University of Waikato.

== Career ==
Dean completed a Bachelor of Laws with honours at the University of Auckland, a Master of Laws at Harvard University, and a Bachelor of Social Science at the University of Waikato.

Dean was made Queen's Counsel in 2004. She was the first woman president of the New Zealand Bar Association, beginning her term in 2011.

Dean was part of the Government’s Ministerial inquiry into the 2013 Fonterra botulinum recall, the Electricity Pricing Review, and Auckland Council's review of council-controlled organisations. Dean led a 2019 Department of Corrections review into prisoner's mail, with Grant O'Fee, after complaints about mail being sent by prisoners. In 2020 she reviewed Weta Digital's workplace culture after allegations of bullying, sexual harassment, intimidation, misogyny and homophobia.

Dean was a member of the Auckland Transition Authority that created the new Auckland Council. She has been Deputy Chair of Auckland Council Investments Ltd and a Director of Crown Fibre Holdings Ltd, Chorus New Zealand, and was chair of New Zealand On Air. She has also chaired the Banking Ombudsman Scheme, and was deputy chair of the Real Estate Institute of New Zealand.

== Honours and awards ==
In the 2011 New Year Honours Dean was appointed a Companion of the New Zealand Order of Merit for services to the law and business. In 2018 Dean was awarded a Distinguished Alumni Award at the University of Waikato.
