= David Collins (judge) =

New Zealand former Solicitor-General (b. 1954)

The Honourable David Collins KC

Justice of the Court of Appeal
- In office 1 April 2019 – 19 March 2024

Solicitor-General of New Zealand
- In office 2006–2012
- Preceded by: Terence Arnold
- Succeeded by: Michael Heron

Personal details
- Born: 18 March 1954 (age 72)
- Education: Victoria University of Wellington; Duke University School of Law

David Collins KC (born 18 March 1954) is a retired judge of the Court of Appeal of New Zealand. He is an acting judge of the Court of Appeal until 18 March 2026. He was the Solicitor-General of New Zealand from 1 September 2006 to 15 March 2012, before being made a judge of the High Court in 2012.

== Education ==
Collins graduated from Victoria University of Wellington with a LL.B.(Hons) (1st Class) in 1975 and an LL.M. in 1976. He was awarded an LL.D. by Victoria University in 1993. He is an Honorary Fellow of the Faculty of Law at Victoria University. He also has a LL.M. Judicial Studies from Duke University School of Law in the United States.

== Professional qualifications ==
Collins was admitted to the New Zealand Bar in 1976. He was admitted to the State of Victoria Bar and the High Court of Australia Bar in 1986. He was appointed Queen's Counsel in 2000.

== Career ==
Upon graduating from Victoria University in 1975, Collins took up a three-month research position at Rhyne & Rhyne in Washington DC. After this role concluded he returned to New Zealand and completed his LL.M. He commenced a two-year clerkship for the Judges of the High Court and Court of Appeal of New Zealand between 1976 and 1978.

In 1979, Collins commenced practicing law in Wellington as a solicitor for Chapman Tripp. In 1982 he was admitted to partnership in a firm that subsequently merged and is today known as Rainey Collins. He remained at the firm until 1995. In 1996 he left practice to become a barrister. During this period he conducted several appeals before the Privy Council in London. He took silk in 2000.

Prior to his appointment as Solicitor-General, Collins was Chair of the Accident Compensation Commission, and Chair of the Health Practitioners Disciplinary Tribunal. Collins has served terms as President of the Wellington District Law Society, vice-president of the New Zealand Law Society, and Executive Vice President and member of the Board of Governors, World Association of Law and Medicine. In 2006, Collins was appointed Solicitor-General. He remained in this role until he was appointed a High Court Judge.

He appeared as senior counsel in over 30 Supreme Court and Privy Council decisions, including:

- North Shore City Council v Attorney-General [The Grange] [2011] 1 NZLR 296 (SC)
- Chapman v Attorney-General [2011] NZSC 110
- R v Gwaze [2010] 3 NZLR 734 (SC)
- Saxmere Company Ltd v Wool Board Disestablishment Company Ltd [2010] 1 NZLR 35, 76 (SC)
- Bain v R [2009] UKPC 4
- Phipps v RACS [2000] 2 NZLR 513 (PC)
- R v Ramstead [1999] 2 AC 92, [1999] 1 NZLR 513 (PC)
- Treaty Tribes Coalition and Others v Urban Maori Authority [1997] 1 NZLR 513 (PC)

Collins has authored a textbook, and has been a contributory author for three other texts. He has written a number of articles.

== Interests ==
Collins has been actively involved in mountaineering and tramping.
