= Jagose =

Jagose is a surname. Notable people with the surname include:

- Annamarie Jagose (born 1965), New Zealand LGBT academic and writer
- Una Jagose, New Zealand lawyer
- Pheroze Jagose, New Zealand High Court Judge
