= Timberworld Ltd v Levin =

- Court: Court of Appeal of New Zealand
- Full case name: Timberworld Ltd v Henry David Levin and Vivienne Judith Madsen-Ries
- Decided: 24 April 2015
- Citation: [2015] NZCA 111; [2015] 3 NZLR 365
- Transcript: Available here

Case history
- Prior action: Levin v Z Energy Ltd [2014] NZHC 688; Levin v Timberworld Ltd [2013] NZHC 3180

Court membership
- Judges sitting: O'Regan P, Stevens and Miller JJ

Keywords
- Peak indebtedness rule, Insolvency

Timberworld Ltd v Levin was a landmark legal decision concerning whether the peak indebtedness rule operated in New Zealand. The peak indebtedness rule concerns how much a liquidator can claw back of the value paid to a creditor of a company, as part continuing business relationship, prior to the debtor company's liquidation. The Court of Appeal judgment rejected the liquidators contention that the rule should be adopted in New Zealand law.

== Background ==
When companies go into liquidation the liquidator is entitled under s 292 of the Companies Act 1993 to clawback property transferred, money paid, and goods or charges given if it is an insolvent transaction entered into within two years of the company commencing liquidation. An insolvent transaction is a transaction that, as per s 292 (2) of the Act, "(a) is entered into at a time when the company is unable to pay its due debts; and (b) enables another person to receive more towards satisfaction of a debt owed by the company than the person would receive, or would be likely to receive, in the company's liquidation".

This is because the "fundamental principle" underpinning insolvency law is the pari passu or equal step principle.

However, as per section 292 (4B) of the Companies Act a "series of transactions will be treated as a single transaction where such transactions are an integral part of a continuous business relationship between the parties (as where the parties have used a running account) and the level of the debtor company’s indebtedness fluctuates from time to time as a result of the various individual transactions. With a transaction of this type the liquidator will only be entitled to claim the net difference of payments made and goods and services received from a creditor, where there is an ongoing business relationship with the debtor company."

The liquidators in these two appeals heard together sought the court's adoption of the "peak indebtedness rule". The rule this; "would enable the liquidators to choose the point during the two-year specified period when the relevant indebtedness was at its highest, as opposed to an earlier date taking into account transactions predating peak indebtedness."

As Justice Stevens summarised of the decision's importance, "Naturally liquidators will wish to use the point where the indebtedness of the company is at its highest. On that basis, any later transactions under which the creditor provides further value to the company will be exceeded in value by other transactions reducing the company’s indebtedness. Liquidators could then point to the net reduction in indebtedness as amounting to a preference. Suppliers, however, will seek to use an earlier date so that any increase in indebtedness is offset by earlier transactions through which the creditor supplier gave value to the debtor company."

== Judgment ==
The Court of Appeal ruled against the liquidators,

We are satisfied the peak indebtedness rule is not part of the law in New Zealand. If Parliament had intended to adopt it, it could have done so without difficulty. It chose not to do so. Any change to the legislative policy as we have interpreted it would be a matter for Parliament. We therefore dismiss the liquidators’ appeal and cross-appeal.

Justice Stevens, giving the judgment of the court, explained the "arbitrariness of peak indebtedness in operation" through an example where three different creditors supply goods on differing terms to a company, but because of the peak indebtedness rule, the preference they are said to receive is wildly different as some transactions are disregarded by the calculation.

Despite each creditor advancing the same value of goods to Company X and receiving the same payments in return, the peak indebtedness rule can operate to produce vastly different outcomes, merely on the basis of the particular credit arrangements in each case.

Justice Stevens also noted that,

The legislature did not see fit to address the peak indebtedness rule, or to include it in the wording of s 292(4B). ...The effect of the section, taken on its face, is to require all payments and transactions within the continuing business relationship to be netted off against one another. This includes both payments to the creditor and the supply of goods to the debtor. Of course where the business relationship began before the start of the two year period, only the transactions occurring within the period are taken into account. The statutory wording does not permit a liquidator to disregard some of those transactions. There is also no basis on which the liquidator can commence with only the first payment, and disregard the first supply of goods. The plain meaning of “all transactions” is just that.

Furthermore, Stevens J observed that similarly to the rule in Allied Concrete Ltd v Meltzer [2015] NZSC 7,

The distinct treatment of trade creditors is, in our view, a similar mechanism. Parliament took the decision to set aside a particular group of creditors who continue to provide credit and goods on the assumption of future trade. That is seen as having distinct commercial benefits in the context of liquidation. It is a policy choice consistent with New Zealand’s insolvency scheme generally.
