= Clive Elliott (barrister) =

New Zealand barrister

Clive Elliott KC
- Born: Clive Lincoln Elliott; Durban, Natal, Union of South Africa
- Citizenship: New Zealand citizenship
- Education: University of Natal; University of Auckland; Victoria University of Wellington
- Occupations: Barrister; arbitrator; author; artist
- Years active: 1983–present
- Spouse: Heather Elliott
- Website: cliveelliottkc.com

Clive Lincoln Elliott KC is a New Zealand barrister specialising in intellectual property law, technology law, and dispute resolution. He was appointed King's Counsel in 2013. Elliott has served as president of the New Zealand Bar Association. In addition to his legal career, he has contributed to legal literature, public commentary on social issues, and advocacy in artistic and governance matters.

== Early life and education ==
Elliott was born in Durban, South Africa. He completed a Bachelor of Laws (LLB) at the University of Natal. Experiencing disenchantment with the racial segregation of apartheid, he immigrated to New Zealand in 1983. In New Zealand, he earned a Master of Laws (LLM) with Honours from Victoria University of Wellington.

== Legal career ==
Elliott joined the intellectual property firm Baldwin Son & Carey (later Baldwin Shelston Waters) in 1984 and later became a partner, leading its litigation team. In 2000, he transitioned to independent practice as a barrister sole, joining the leading set of chambers, Shortland Chambers, focusing on intellectual property, technology, and media law.

Elliott has appeared as counsel in significant intellectual property cases before the High Court of New Zealand, Court of Appeal of New Zealand, and Supreme Court of New Zealand. He has also represented clients in the Judicial Committee of the Privy Council in London.

He was appointed as a Queen's Counsel in 2013, later changing to King's Counsel following the death of Queen Elizabeth II on 8 September 2022. He is a Fellow of the Arbitrators' and Mediators' Institute of New Zealand (AMINZ) and has served on arbitration panels, including for the World Intellectual Property Organization (WIPO).

== Publications ==
Elliott has authored and co-authored several works on intellectual property law, including:

- Copyright and Design in New Zealand (co-author, published by LexisNexis).
- Patents and Trade Marks in New Zealand (co-author, published by LexisNexis).
- The Power of Wellbeing (2021), exploring governance and public policy.

== Artistic and public engagement ==
Elliott has exhibited paintings in New Zealand, focusing on themes related to climate change and social issues. His exhibition So Much to Lose! in 2020 centred on environmental concerns.

In 2021, he delivered a TEDx talk in Auckland, discussing governance and social cohesion in a post-pandemic world.

== Awards and recognitions ==
- Recognised by Chambers and Partners as a leading intellectual property barrister.
- Listed in Who’s Who Legal for patents and internet/e-commerce law.

== See also ==
- List of King's and Queen's Counsel in New Zealand
