= Ted Thomas (judge) =

New Zealand judge

Sir Edmund Walter Thomas KNZM KC PC (born 1934) is a New Zealand jurist. He is a retired judge of the Court of Appeal of New Zealand and a former acting judge of the Supreme Court of New Zealand.

== Biography ==
Born in 1934, Thomas was educated at Feilding Agricultural High School and Victoria University College graduating with a BA and LLB in 1956, and the higher doctorate LLD in 2009. He was admitted to the bar as a barrister and solicitor of the Supreme Court (later the High Court) of New Zealand.

Following many years as a partner at New Zealand law firm Russell McVeagh, he became a barrister sole and was appointed Queen's Counsel in 1981.

In 1989 and 1990, he was President of the New Zealand Bar Association, and in 1990 he was appointed to the bench of the High Court of New Zealand. In 1995 he was elevated to the Court of Appeal. He retired from the appellate bench in 2001. As a judge some saw him as a proponent of judicial activism. He was also noted for his frequent dissenting judgements, particularly after 1996.

In 2002 Thomas was visiting fellow at the Research School of Social Sciences, The Australian National University, Canberra. From August 2004 he has been serving as a Distinguished Visiting Fellow, The University of Auckland.

He was appointed a director of the Reserve Bank of New Zealand in 2003, for a five-year term.

Justice Thomas was brought out of retirement to become an acting Judge of the Supreme Court of New Zealand from 2005.

He is a noted author, his works including The Judicial Process: Realism, Pragmatism, Practical Reasoning and Principles (Cambridge University Press, Cambridge, 2005).

== Honours and awards ==
In 1990, Thomas was awarded the New Zealand 1990 Commemoration Medal. He was made a member of the Privy Council in 1996. In the 2002 New Year Honours, he was appointed a Distinguished Companion of the New Zealand Order of Merit, for services as a judge of the Court of Appeal. Following the re-introduction of titular honours by the New Zealand government, he accepted redesignation as a Knight Companion of the New Zealand Order of Merit in 2009.

== Notable judgments ==
- Re Taylor (1992) 4 NZBLC 102,875.
- Livingston v. Roskilly [1992] 3 NZLR 230
