= Allied Concrete Ltd v Meltzer =

- Court: Supreme Court of New Zealand
- Full case name: Allied Concrete Limited V Jeffrey Philip Meltzer And Lloyd James Hayward As Liquidators Of Window Holdings Limited (In Liquidation)
- Decided: 18 February 2015
- Citation: [2015] NZSC 7; [2016] 1 NZLR 141
- Transcript: Available here

Case history
- Prior action: Meltzer v Allied Concrete Ltd [2013] NZHC 977; Allied Concrete Ltd v Meltzer [2013] NZSC 102; Farrell v Fences & Kerbs Ltd [2013] NZCA 91; Farrell v Fences & Kerbs Ltd [2013] NZCA 329.

Court membership
- Judges sitting: Elias CJ, McGrath, William Young J, Glazebrook and Arnold JJ.

Keywords
- Voidable transactions, Insolvency

Allied Concrete Ltd v Meltzer was a landmark Supreme Court decision on the defence to a court order allowing a liquidator to claw back value from an insolvent transaction. The matter in contention concerned whether repaying an old debt satisfied the words "gave value" in section 296(3)(c) of the Companies Act 1993. The Supreme Court unanimously agreed that "gave value" includes value given when a debt was initially incurred by the now insolvent debtor company.

== Background ==
Section 292(1) of the Companies Act 1993 says that an insolvent transaction entered into within two years of a company commencing liquidation can be voided by the liquidator. Section 292(2) of that Act defines an insolvent transaction as one that,

(a) is entered into at a time when the company is unable to pay its due debts; and

(b) enables another person to receive more towards satisfaction of a debt owed by the company than the person would receive, or would be likely to receive, in the company's liquidation.

Section 295 of the Act allows a court to make a range of orders to set an insolvent transaction aside on the application of the liquidator. As Justice Arnold in the Supreme Court noted, "The court may, for example, order a person to pay the company an amount that fairly represents some or all of the benefits received because of the transaction." Section 296(3) of the Act provides a defence to the s 295 orders:

(3) A court must not order the recovery of property of a company (or its equivalent value) by a liquidator, whether under this Act, any other enactment, or in law or in equity, if the person from whom recovery is sought (A) proves that when A received the property—

(a) A acted in good faith; and

(b) a reasonable person in A's position would not have suspected, and A did not have reasonable grounds for suspecting, that the company was, or would become, insolvent; and

(c) A gave value for the property or altered A's position in the reasonably held belief that the transfer of the property to A was valid and would not be set aside.

The question before the Supreme Court was "whether the value referred to [in 296(3)(c)] must be given at or after the time of payment, or may precede it".

== Judgment ==
McGrath, Glazebrook and Arnold JJ gave the majority judgment and Elias CJ and William Young J concurred in separate judgments. All three judgments overturned the Court of Appeal's decision that "gave value" did not include where a company had given value preceding the insolvent transaction.

Justice Arnold, delivering the majority judgment held,

As we have said, the Court of Appeal’s interpretation of s 296(3) does not advance the objective of providing creditors with more certainty that the transactions they enter into will not be made void but, rather, undermines it. We think it implausible that Parliament intended the types of outcome that we have just identified. Accordingly, we consider that s 296(3) should be interpreted consistently with the Australian provision, which is consistent with the approach that was taken historically in relation to the “valuable consideration” requirement in the bankruptcy legislation. On that approach, “value” under s 296(3), while it must be real and substantial, can include value given when the debt was initially incurred or value arising from by the reduction or extinguishment of a liability to the creditor incurred by the debtor company as a result of an earlier transaction. In this context, it must be remembered that before a creditor can take advantage of the s 296(3) defence, it must show that it acted in good faith and there were no reasonable grounds for a creditor in its position to believe that the company was technically insolvent. These are significant requirements, not easily met.

In addition, as a Russell McVeagh publication notes, "The majority confirmed that cash on delivery or payment in advance does not give rise to voidable transaction exposure, as no repayment of debt occurs."

== Significance ==
The decision is good for creditors of companies. As was noted in one case comment,

The Supreme Court's decision brings welcome certainty for those providing goods and services on credit with no security (eg sub-contractors in the construction industry). Value can include value given when the debt was initially incurred. New Zealand's good faith defence is now aligned in this respect with the equivalent provision in Australia. This consistency will be welcomed by businesses operating on both sides of the Tasman.

In circumstances where creditors provided value for their payment, a payment to a creditor will not be voidable where the creditor both acted in good faith and had no reasonable grounds to suspect insolvency. We expect that greater focus will now be placed on whether creditors suspected, or ought to have suspected, insolvency at the time of payment and whether substantial value was given by the creditor. There are other potential elements to the defence, for example alteration of position, which were not considered.
