= Terence Arnold =

New Zealand judge (born 1947)

The Honourable Sir Terence Arnold KNZM KC
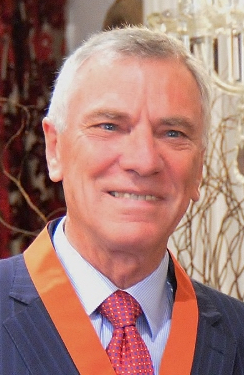
- Arnold in 2016

Justice of the Supreme Court
- In office 11 June 2013 – 12 April 2017
- Preceded by: Robert Chambers

Solicitor-General of New Zealand
- In office 2000–2006
- Prime Minister: Helen Clark
- Preceded by: John McGrath
- Succeeded by: Dr David Collins

Personal details
- Born: 1947 (age 78–79)

Sir Terence Arnold KNZM KC (born 1947) is a former judge of the Supreme Court of New Zealand. He was the Solicitor-General of New Zealand from 2000, before being made a judge of the Court of Appeal of New Zealand in 2006. He was elevated to the Supreme Court on 11 June 2013.

== Career ==
Arnold graduated from Victoria University of Wellington with a B.A. and LL.M. and from New York University with an LL.M. He taught criminal law at Victoria University of Wellington as well as at several Canadian universities, including Dalhousie University and the University of Calgary. He taught at different law schools of New Zealand and Canada in the years between 1970 and 1982. Later, in 1986, he became a monitoring and advising member for the Bill of Rights. He was a partner of Chapman Tripp Sheffield Young between 1985 and 1994. He became a barrister sole in 1994 and shortly thereafter was appointed Queen's Counsel. He is one of the founders of the Law and Economics Association of New Zealand and became its president for a year in 1996. He also played a noticeable part in the establishment of the New Zealand Law Society Litigation Skills Programme and the Civil Litigation Skills Programme. He was Solicitor-General between 2000 and 2006. He was appointed a judge of the High Court and the Court of Appeal in May 2006. He was appointed a judge of the Supreme Court on 11 June 2013. On 12 April 2017, he retired from the permanent bench of the Supreme Court, having reached 70 years of age, but sits as a retired judge when required.

In the 2016 New Year Honours, Arnold was appointed a Knight Companion of the New Zealand Order of Merit, for services to the judiciary.

Arnold was appointed, alongside former Prime Minister Geoffrey Palmer, to the 2018 inquiry into the NZSAS murder of at least six civilians and the wounding of fifteen more in Operation Burnham. The inquiry's report found the attack on the villagers was justified.

Arnold was appointed to the Cook Islands Court of Appeal in December 2022 and the Supreme Court of Fiji in July 2023

On 16 October 2026, the Hong Kong government announced that Arnold would join the Hong Kong Court of Final Appeal as a foreign non-permanent judge after receiving the endorsement of the Legislative Council of Hong Kong.
