= Althea Carbon =

New Zealand lawyer

Althea Carbon is a Filipino-New Zealand lawyer and co-founder of Charity-IT, a not-for-profit organisation that helps charities improve their IT systems.

Carbon was born in the Philippines and her family moved to Christchurch when she was 10 years old. She attended the University of Canterbury, where she became CEO of Entre, a student-run company focused on developing entrepreneurship in students.

On graduating, she moved to Wellington to work as a lawyer for Chapman Tripp. In 2013, she co-founded Charity-IT as a way for IT students to share their skills with the not-for-profit sector. She is also a mentor with the Asian Law Students Society at Victoria University.

In 2014 she won the Emerging Leader category at the New Zealand Women of Influence Award for her work encouraging women to engage in entrepreneurship, science, and technology.
