= Christine Grice =

New Zealand lawyer and jurist

The Honourable Christine Grice CNZM

Justice of the High Court
- Incumbent
- Assumed office 20 December 2017

President of the New Zealand Law Society
- In office 1999–2003
- Preceded by: Ian Haynes
- Succeeded by: Christopher Darlow

Personal details
- Born: Christine Mary Grice
- Education: University of Canterbury
- Profession: Lawyer, judge

Christine Mary Grice CNZM is a New Zealand lawyer and jurist, who was the first female judge in the Cook Islands, and the second female president of the New Zealand Law Society.

== Career ==
Grice studied at University of Canterbury for a Bachelor of Laws degree, graduating on 2 May 1979, and was admitted as a barrister within the High Court of New Zealand in 1981. She became the first female judge in the Cook Islands in June 2007. As part of the High Court of the Cook Islands, she normally presides on cases for two weeks each year, spending the remaining time in New Zealand.

Within law societies, she began being a member of the council of the New Zealand Law Society (NZLS) in 1992, and joined its board in the following year. In 1997 she became vice-president, and served as president of the NZLS between 1999 and 2003. She was the second female president in the organisation's history, following Judith Potter who was president between 1991 and 1993; and who was the second female judge in the Cook Islands after Grice. Grice succeeded Ian Haynes in April 1999. Following her three-year term, she became executive director of the society.

In the 2004 New Year Honours, Grice was appointed a Companion of the New Zealand Order of Merit, for services to the legal profession.

On 20 December 2017, she was appointed Justice of the High Court of New Zealand. On 11 September 2026, Grice was granted retention of the title The Honourable for life, in recognition of her service as a judge of the High Court.
