= Companies Act 1993 =

Act of Parliament in New Zealand

New Zealand Parliament
- Long title: An Act to reform the law relating to companies, and, in particular,— (a) to reaffirm the value of the company as a means of achieving economic and social benefits through the aggregation of capital for productive purposes, the spreading of economic risk, and the taking of business risks; and (b) to provide basic and adaptable requirements for the incorporation, organisation, and operation of companies; and (c) to define the relationships between companies and their directors, shareholders, and creditors; and (d) to encourage efficient and responsible management of companies by allowing directors a wide discretion in matters of business judgment while at the same time providing protection for shareholders and creditors against the abuse of management power; and (e) to provide straightforward and fair procedures for realising and distributing the assets of insolvent companies
- Royal assent: 28 September 1993
- Status: Current legislation

The Companies Act is an Act of Parliament passed in New Zealand in 1993.

The Act regulates companies, and replaces the earlier Companies Act of 1955.

== Case law ==
- Allied Concrete Ltd v Meltzer - Decision determining the meaning of "gave value" in section 296(3)(c) of the Companies Act.
- Mason v Lewis - Decision holding that the test for determining what reckless trading under section 135 of the Companies Act 1993 is an objective one.
- Timberworld Ltd v Levin - Decision concerning whether the peak indebtedness rule operated in New Zealand (section 292 of the Companies Act).
