= Ahuroa Gas Storage Facility =

Gas Storage facility at Ahurao, New Zealand

Coordinates: 39°15′54″S 174°20′25″E

The Ahuroa Gas Storage Facility is an underground natural gas storage facility situated at Ahuroa in the Taranaki region of New Zealand, owned by Flex Gas, a subsidiary of First Gas. Flex Gas is the trading name of Gas Services New Zealand.

The stored gas is used to supply the Stratford Power Station and other major users of gas when needed during periods of peak demand. The facility can store up to 7 PJ of gas, with injection rates up to 65 terajoules per day and withdrawal rates of up to 65 terajoules per day.

== History ==
The Tariki / Ahuroa field was discovered in 1986. Construction of wellsite facilities began in 1995 and production commenced in 1996. The facility was in turn owned by Fletcher Challenge, Shell and Swift Energy.

In 2008, when the field was largely depleted, it was acquired by Origin Energy as part of the Tariki / Ahuroa / Waihapa / Ngaere assets. Gas injection into storage began in 2008 and the surface facility was constructed by Contact Energy in 2009 and 2010.

The facility was officially opened in 2011 with a development cost of $177m.

In 2017, Contact Energy sold the gas storage facility to Gas Services New Zealand.

== See also ==
- Oil and gas industry in New Zealand
