= Lawyers for Climate Action NZ =

Legal lobby group in New Zealand

Lawyers for Climate Action NZ Inc (LCANZI, also known as LCANZ) is a climate advocacy group that has been active since 2019. A non-profit, it includes over 300 lawyers, solicitors, and academics. LCANZI was created to encourage New Zealand to take more ambitious actions to meet its Paris Agreement commitments.

LCANZI has advocated for New Zealand's law and actions to be consistent with its stated commitments under the Paris Agreement, Te Tiriti o Waitangi principles, and requirements under recent climate regulation such as the Climate Change Response (Zero Carbon) Amendment Act. Activities undertaken by the group have included climate change litigation, consultation, submissions, and pro-bono legal advice.

LCANZI held its first AGM in June 2019 and elected Jenny Cooper as president. As of 2023, LCANZI's current President is Bronwyn Carruthers. Membership has been open to all people who hold a law degree, however students and non-lawyers have also been able to join as associates.

== Notable cases ==
=== Lawyers for Climate Action v. Firstgas Group ===
In 2021, LCANZI filed a complaint with the New Zealand Advertising Standards Authority against an advertising campaign by First Gas. LCANZI argued that the First Gas advertisements amounted to greenwashing, due to factual inaccuracies and encouragement of complacency instead of action to address climate change. This claim was partially upheld by the New Zealand Advertising Standards board, which ordered First Gas to remove the advertisements.

=== Lawyers for Climate Action v. Climate Change Commission ===
In another notable case in 2021, LCANZI filed a judicial review of the New Zealand Climate Change Commission’s recommendations to the New Zealand Government. This case questioned the Climate Change Commission's carbon calculations and accounting that informed the recommendations for the government's amendment of New Zealand's nationally determined contribution for 2021 to 2030. LCANZI advocated for more transparent recommendations that clearly advocated for domestic emission reductions and contributed to New Zealand's global commitments towards a 1.5°C pathway.

The case was unsuccessful with the High Court ruling that the Zero Carbon Act did not require meeting the 1.5°C global pathway in order to contribute to global commitments towards this aim. Justice Jill Mallon stated that other factors—such as economic impacts—are also important to the Climate Change Commission's recommendations. The Climate Change Commission described defending itself as a non-beneficial use of time and resources for the New Zealand public, and, unsuccessfully, sought for LCANZI to pay for its costs. LCANZI has said it will appeal the Climate Commission case through the court of appeal.

=== Lawyers for Climate Action v. Climate Change Minister ===
In March 2026, Lawyers for Climate Action along with the Environmental Law Initiative brought a case against Minister for Climate Change Simon Watts to the high court. Their case argued that the government's plan to tackle climate change is inherently risky, and that dismantling dozens of climate policies without consulting the public was unlawful. The two groups have shared concerns that New Zealand may not reach its 2030 climate targets, especially the methane target, based on the revised policies.

== Change litigation in New Zealand ==
While achieving success internationally, climate change ligation has not yet achieved significant rulings in New Zealand. Instead, recent court rulings have stressed the need for further regulation from policy makers before issues can be addressed in the courts.

Courts have also highlighted the costs of private litigation as a barrier for using this method to achieve timely and efficient action on climate change. High costs have also affected LCANZI, which describes itself as a small volunteer-based organisation funded by membership rates.

While environmental litigation cases often fall under public interest in New Zealand—therefore not receiving costs if court cases are lost—public interest status is not guaranteed. In discussing LCANZI, David Bullock, the author of a book on cost recovery cases in New Zealand, said that high costs against public interest groups could have a chilling effect on further environmental litigation.

== See also ==
- Climate change litigation
