= Anna Adams (lawyer) =

New Zealand lawyer

Anna Adams KC

Solicitor-General of New Zealand
- Incumbent
- Assumed office 11 May 2026
- Preceded by: Una Jagose

Personal details
- Education: University of Auckland; Yale Law School

Anna May Adams KC is a New Zealand lawyer and King's Counsel, who is currently serving as the Solicitor-General from May 2026. She was appointed King's Counsel effective 13 March 2026, and she became Solicitor-General on 11 May 2026.

== Education ==
Anna Adams studied law and political science at the University of Auckland, graduating with an Bachelor of Law (Honours) and a Bachelor of Arts in political science in 1995. She later completed a Master of Law at Yale Law School in 1998. Adams later graduated from the Harvard Business School's Global Women's Leadership Forum.

== Legal career ==
Adams was admitted to the New Zealand bar as a barrister and solicitor in 1996. After graduating from Yale in 1998, she was admitted to the New York State Bar and United States Federal Court in 1999.

After a period of practising law in the United States, Adams worked for 20 years at Meredith Connell, a major Auckland-based public law and Crown prosecution firm. Besides serving as the firm's lead public and health law partner, Adams also worked as a Crown prosecutor. She also served for four years as the chair of Meredith Connell's board. Anna served as lead counsel on several coronial inquests and major inquiries before the District Court of New Zealand, High Court of New Zealand and the Court of Appeal of New Zealand. She also represented both public and private sector clients in several criminal prosecutions and civil cases.

Adams later became a barrister and public law expert at the law firm Bankside Chambers. While at Bankside Chambers, she advised the New Zealand Transport Agency during its 2019–2021 vehicle compliance review, represented the Mayor of Auckland Wayne Brown in Mike Bush's review of the Auckland Council's handling of the 2023 Auckland Anniversary Weekend floods, and appeared in the inquest into the Cris and Cru Kahui homicides.

== Solicitor-General, 2026–present ==
On 11 March 2026, Attorney-General Judith Collins appointed Adams as the Solicitor General, effective 11 May 2026. In early November 2026, the Public Service Association filed legal proceedings against Adams and the Crown Law Office over a proposed restructure that would eliminate two deputy solicitor-generals. The trade union argued that the consultation timeframe of nine days was insufficient and that the proposed restructure would weaken its criminal law team.

== Other roles and activities ==
In addition to her legal career, Adams has served as a long-standing member of the Auckland Medico-Legal Society's governing committee and is an associate member of the New Zealand Institute of Directors. Between 2017 and 2019, she served on the board of the New Zealand Civil Aviation Authority. In May 2025, Adams was appointed to the board of New Zealand's pharmaceutical purchasing agency, Pharmac.
