= Mason v Lewis =

Court decision

- Court: Court of Appeal
- Decided: 30 March 2006
- Citation: [2006] 3 NZLR 225
- Transcript: Court of Appeal judgment

Case history
- Prior action: High Court Auckland M 459-IM03, 25 November 2004
- Subsequent action: High Court Auckland CIV 2003-404-0936, 1 October 2008; Court of Appeal [2009] NZCA 306; Supreme Court [2009] NZSC 103

Court membership
- Judges sitting: Hammond, Chambers and Robertson JJ

Keywords
- Directors' duties, Corporate law, reckless trading

Mason v Lewis is a Court of Appeal decision that held that the test for determining what reckless trading under section 135 of the Companies Act 1993 is an objective one. The decision also clarified that s 135 is concerned not with deterring mere risk but with prohibiting "substantial risk of serious loss".

== Background ==
Mr and Mrs Lewis were directors of their own printing business, set up in 1984, who invested in and became directors of a company called Global Print in 1999. Global Print was the idea of Mr Grant, who became its manager. In February 2000 Global Print lost its main contract, although the Lewises did not learn of this until April 2000. Until this point there were four other directors, three former colleagues of Mr Grant and his wife, Mrs Grant, but on 20 April 2000 the three former colleagues resigned as directors. The financial position of the company gradually worsened and in September 2001 Mrs Lewis resigned as a director. In February 2002 Global Print was placed into liquidation and a complaint was made to the Serious Fraud Office about Mr Grant, which resulted in him being convicted of five charges of fraud for arranging false invoices to Global Print which were factored to another company.

The liquidators went to the High Court alleging breaches by the Lewises of their duties under ss 135 and 300 of the Companies Act 1993. Section 135 states,

A director of a company must not—

(a) agree to the business of the company being carried on in a manner likely to create a substantial risk of serious loss to the company's creditors; or

(b) cause or allow the business of the company to be carried on in a manner likely to create a substantial risk of serious loss to the company's creditors.

Section 300 allows for the personal liability of directors if proper accounting records have not been kept.

In the High Court Justice Salmon held, "that there must be a conscious decision to allow the business to be conducted in a way that creates a substantial risk of serious loss to the company's creditors or a wilful or grossly negligent turning of a blind eye to the particular situation; in other words, some element of subjectivity."

The liquidators appealed.

== Judgment ==
Justice Hammond delivered the decision of the Court and overturned Justice Salmon's decision that in determining whether or not a breach of s 135 of the Companies Act had occurred a court should consider the director's subjective intentions.

The essential pillars of the present section are as follows:

• the duty which is imposed by s 135 is one owed by directors to the company (rather than to any particular creditors);
• the test is an objective one;
• it focuses not on a director’s belief, but rather on the manner in which a company’s business is carried on, and whether that modus operandi creates a substantial risk of serious loss; and

• what is required when the company enters troubled financial waters is what Ross (above at para [48]) accurately described as a “sober assessment” by the directors, we would add of an ongoing character, as to the company’s likely future income and prospects.

— Hammond J, Mason v Lewis

In applying this test the Court observed, "In our view, any reasonable and prudent director would have known by July 2000, or at the very latest by mid-August 2000, that the company was in deep trouble, that even radical surgery might not save it, and that the cessation of trading had to be contemplated. [...] This is a paradigm case of reckless trading under s 135 of the Companies Act."

The Court then stated, "Directors must take reasonable steps to put themselves in a position not only to guide but to monitor the management of a company. The days of sleeping directors with merely an investment interest are long gone: the limitation of liability given by incorporation is conditional on proper compliance with the statute."
