= First Gas =

Natural gas transmission and distribution company

First Gas Limited
- Formerly: NGC, Vector Gas
- Industry: Natural gas transmission and distribution
- Headquarters: New Plymouth, New Zealand
- Key people: Mark Ratcliffe (chair)
- Brands: Firstgas
- Number of employees: 130
- Website: firstgas.co.nz

First Gas Limited is a natural gas transmission and distribution company in New Zealand. First Gas's network has 2,517 km (1,564 mi) of high pressure pipelines transmitting gas across the North Island, and 4,996 km (3,104 mi) of gas distribution pipelines in Northland, Waikato, Bay of Plenty, Gisborne, and the Kapiti Coast. Through Flex Gas, First Gas owns and operates the Ahuroa Gas Storage Facility.

== History ==
The Natural Gas Corporation (NGC) was established by the New Zealand government to buy, process, and wholesale natural gas from the Kapuni gas field, which was discovered in 1959. NGC built the first high pressure gas transmission lines in the late 1960s, initially supplying Kapuni gas to Auckland, Hamilton, New Plymouth, Wanganui, Palmerston North, and Wellington. The network was expanded through the 1970s and 1980s, supporting the major growth of the oil and gas industry at that time.

NGC was privatised in 1992. The Australian Gas Light (AGL) sold NGC to Vector Limited in 2004 and 2005. In 2016, Vector sold its entire transmission business, along with its gas distribution networks outside Auckland, to First State Funds. The new owner established First Gas Limited to operate these assets.

The Māui pipeline, constructed separately in the 1970s, was owned by Māui Development Ltd and operated independently of NGC/Vector. In 2016, First Gas purchased the Maui natural gas pipeline from Maui Development for $335 million. At that time, ownership of Maui Development was between Shell (84%), OMV NZ (10%) and Todd Energy (6%).

In 2017, First Gas purchased the Ahuroa Gas Storage Facility from Contact Energy.

== Transmission ==
The First Gas transmission network comprises 2,517 kilometres (1,564 mi) of high-pressure pipelines that transport natural gas from fields in Taranaki to destinations across the North Island. In the year to 30 September 2024, the system transmitted 116,125 TJ of natural gas. Gas is supplied either directly to large consumers, such as the Huntly Power Station and Methanex, or to distribution networks operated by First Gas Distribution, Vector, Powerco, and GasNet for delivery to mass-market consumers.

The transmission network has two major systems: the Kapuni system and the Māui system.

=== Kapuni system ===
The core Kapuni system was established in 1970 with two major pipelines originating from the Kapuni Gas Treatment Plant in South Taranaki: one running north towards Auckland and the other south towards Wellington. The system was expanded in the early 1980s with three major extensions: north from Auckland to Whangārei; east from the northern pipeline at Pokuru (southwest of Te Awamutu) to Tauranga, Kawerau and Gisborne; and east from the southern pipeline near Palmerston North to Hastings.

In normal operation, the Kapuni system is divided into two subsystems by closing a mainline valve south of Pokuru. Gas supply to the northern half of the system is usually provided via the Māui system.

=== Māui system ===
Map of the main Māui pipeline

The Māui system was established in 1979 to transport gas from the Māui gas field. Its main pipeline is 302 kilometres (188 mi) long, running from the Oaonui Production Station near Ōpunake to the Huntly Power Station.

In the year to 30 September 2024, the Māui system transported 93,542 TJ of gas, representing 81% of the total transmitted.

A major branch, the Frankley Road sub-system, connects the Māui pipeline at Frankley Road offtake station (southwest of New Plymouth) to the Stratford Power Station and the southern Kapuni system at the Kapuni Gas Treatment Plant. The Māui system also has interconnections with the northern Kapuni system at Pokuru and at Rotowaro, west of Huntly.

Unlike the Kapuni system, which distributes odourised gas, the Māui system transports unodourised gas, as odourants such as mercaptan can interfere with some industrial processes. Odourant is instead added at delivery points, or at interconnection stations (Kapuni, Pokuru, and Rotowaro) where Māui gas enters the Kapuni system.

=== Major pipelines ===
Major natural gas pipelines in New Zealand
Ref.	Diameter	Length	Origin	Destination	Year built	Note
100	200 mm (8 in)	253 km (157 mi)	Kapuni Gas Treatment Plant	Waitangirua delivery point	1968	
200	200 mm (8 in)	344 km (214 mi)	Kapuni Gas Treatment Plant	Papakura delivery point	1968	
300	500 mm (20 in)	47 km (29 mi)	400 pipeline at Frankley Road offtake station	Kapuni Gas Treatment Plant	1974	
400 & 403	750 mm (30 in)	302 km (188 mi)	Oaonui Production Station	Huntly Power Station	1977	Māui pipeline
400B	350 mm (14 in)	90 km (56 mi)	400 pipeline at Rotowaro compression station	Westfield delivery point	1981	
430	150 mm (6 in)	185 km (115 mi)	400B pipeline at Westfield delivery point	Maungatapere delivery point	1982	
500	200 mm (8 in)	182 km (113 mi)	200 and 400 pipelines at Pokuru compression station	Kawerau delivery point	1980–82	
505	100 mm (4 in)	201 km (125 mi)	500 pipeline at Kawerau compression station	Gisborne delivery point	1984	
700 & 113	200 mm (8 in)	183 km (114 mi)	100 pipeline at Himatangi offtake station	Hastings delivery point	1980–82	
800	100 mm (4 in)	88 km (55 mi)	500 pipeline at Lichfield offtake station	Te Puke delivery point	1980	

== Distribution ==
First Gas owns and operates the natural gas distribution networks in Northland, Waikato, Bay of Plenty, Gisborne, and the Kapiti Coast. These networks convey gas from transmission delivery points to mass-market consumers—including households, businesses, and small industries—through a mix of low-, medium-, and intermediate-pressure pipelines.

=== Statistics ===
First Gas Limited gas distribution network statistics for the year ending 30 September 2024
Parameter	Value
Regulatory asset base	$220 million
Line charge revenue	$34.8 million
Capital expenditure	$7.4 million
Operating expenditure	$12.5 million
Customer connections	67,994
Total gas conveyed	9,096 TJ
Maximum daily load	34.0 TJ
System length	4,996 km

== See also ==
- Oil and gas industry in New Zealand
