= Chapman Tripp =

Commercial law firm in New Zealand

- No. of offices: 3
- No. of attorneys: 180+
- No. of employees: c.400
- Major practice areas: General Practice
- Key people: Pip England (Chief Executive Partner); Emma Sutcliffe (Chair of the Board); Sophia Gunn (Chief Operations Officer)
- Date founded: 1875
- Website: chapmantripp.com

Chapman Tripp is one of New Zealand's largest commercial law firms. It is considered one of the "big three" law firms along with Russell McVeagh and Bell Gully. Established in New Zealand in 1875, it now has around 53 partners and roughly 180 legal staff across its offices in Auckland, Wellington and Christchurch. The firm practices in all areas of corporate and commercial, property, construction, finance, tax, dispute resolution, environmental and public law.

== History ==
Chapman Tripp started as a one-man practice in Wellington in 1875 with Martin Chapman. Chapman was joined in partnership by William Fitzgerald in 1882 and then by Leonard Owen Howard Tripp in 1889, who spent a record 69 years with the firm.

The firm went through many name changes, reverting to Chapman Tripp & Co in 1949.

In 1962 the firm opened an Auckland office, becoming the first law firm to have offices in both Auckland and Wellington. In 1985 Chapman Tripp merged with Sheffield Young and Ellis, becoming Chapman Tripp Sheffield Young, and in late 1997 the Christchurch office was opened.

== Notable alumni ==
Supreme Court judge Justice Arnold was a partner of predecessor firm Chapman Tripp Sheffield Young between 1985 and 1994. He later served as Solicitor-General between 2000 and 2006 before becoming a judge of the Court of Appeal, sitting from 2006 until his elevation to the Supreme Court.

The Honourable Justice Sir Mark O'Regan of the Court of Appeal served as partner at Chapman Tripp from 1984. He was appointed to the High Court in 2001, and was elevated to the Court of Appeal in 2004 where he served as President of the Court of Appeal, until his elevation to the Supreme Court in September 2014. Justice Miller was a partner at Chapman Tripp from 1987, until appointment to the High Court in 2004, then to the Court of Appeal in June 2013, and to the Supreme Court in December 2023.

High Court judges Collins, Ellis, Gilbert, Jagose, Katz, MacKenzie and Peters of the High Court all previously held roles at Chapman Tripp, as have a number of District Court judges.

Other notable alumni include:

- Althea Carbon, founder of Charity-IT
- Philip Cooke (1893–1956), judge and decorated WWI veteran
- Stephen Franks (born 1950), politician, lawyer and media commentator
- Rez Gardi, international lawyer and human rights activist

== Supporting the community ==
Chapman Tripp has formal partnerships with nine community organisations, BLAKE, New Zealand Opera, First Foundation, Māia Health Foundation, The Aotearoa Circle, Auckland City Mission, Wellington City Mission, Centre for Sustainable Finance, and Circa Theatre.

Chapman Tripp sponsored the Chapman Tripp Theatre Awards from 1992 - 2014. Chapman Tripp has also supported the Auckland Philharmonia Orchestra, Orchestra Wellington, the Christchurch Symphony Orchestra.

== Rankings ==
Chapman Tripp is regularly ranked as one of New Zealand's leading law firms, and is considered a top-tier firm in Banking, Finance and Project Finance; Capital Markets; Corporate Commercial and M&A; Dispute Resolution; Real Estate & Construction; and Restructuring and Insolvency.
