= Livingstone v Roskilly =

Livingstone v Roskilly.
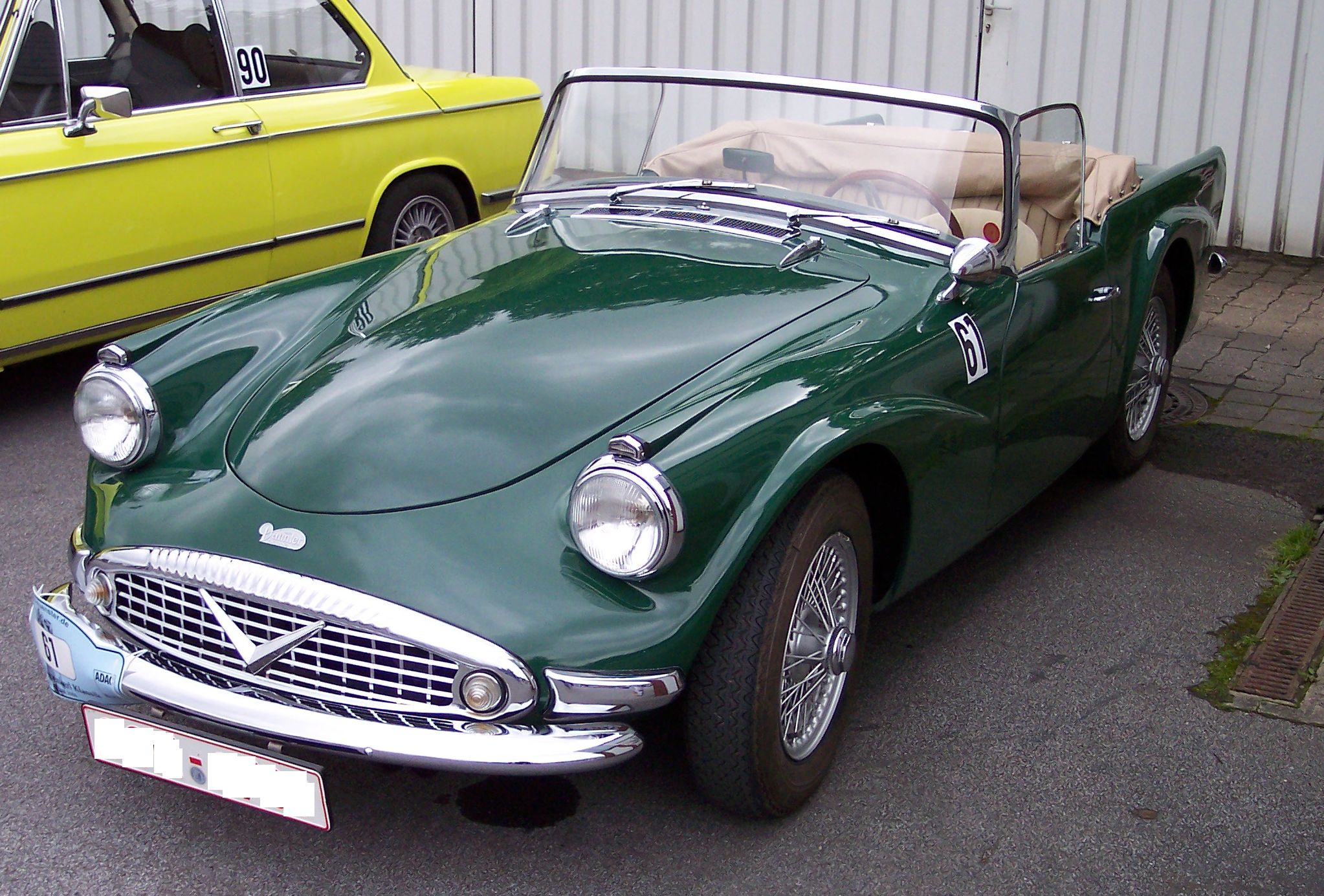
- Court: New Zealand High Court at Auckland.
- Full case name: Mark David Livingstone v Nigel Roskilly (trading as CLASSIC CAR STABLE)
- Decided: 2 March 1992.
- Citation: [1992] 3 NZLR 230; (1992) 4 NZBLC 102,640.

Case history
- Prior actions: District Court, Auckland

Court membership
- Judge sitting: Thomas J.

Keywords
- Contract, Exclusion clause, Bailment.

Livingstone v Roskilly [1992] 3 NZLR 230 was a 1992 New Zealand appeal case questioning whether an "all care, no responsibility" clause excluded liability for negligent damage to a bailor's goods.

== Facts ==
Livingstone had bought a Daimler Dart from Roskilly, who ran a classic car stable. The car required some further work which Roskilly agreed to undertake. The work was done by Friday, and the car was left in the garage over the long weekend. Over the weekend the car was stolen. Mr Livingstone sued Mr Roskilly for the value of the car. The two questions before the District Court were, first, whether Mr Roskilly had taken all reasonable care to prevent the loss of the car and, secondly, whether he was exempt from liability by reason of the notice that was displayed in the garage workshop. The District Court Judge held that the lock on the garage door was inadequate, particularly as the key to the car was left in its ignition. Mr Roskilly was therefore held to have acted negligently. The sole question on appeal was whether the notice that was displayed in the workshop excluded Mr Roskilly's liability in negligence for the bailment of the car. The sign read:

"ALL VEHICLES STORED and DRIVEN at

OWNERS RISK

All Care Taken: NO RESPONSIBILITY."

Thomas J held there was no exemption. The sign was to be interpreted such that "All Care" meant that the car would be fully secured at the garage. Only after being secured would the "No Responsibility" clause be triggered, covering Roskilly from any damage arising. As the car was not secure, and negligently so, the responsibility clause was not triggered. Therefore, Mr Roskilly was not exempted from liability in negligence.

Livingstone v Roskilly was distinguished on its facts by Shipbuilders v Benson [1992] 3 NZLR 549 in the Court of Appeal soon after.
