= Re Taylor =

- Court: Auckland High Court
- Full case name: In Re Taylor
- Decided: 1 September 1992
- Citation: (1992) 4 NZBLC 102,875

Court membership
- Judge sitting: Thomas J

Keywords
- Insolvency, Rogernomics

Re Taylor is a leading New Zealand case on when the High Court will exercise its discretion and refuse to adjudicate a debtor bankrupt.

== Background ==
The background to the application to adjudicate Mr Taylor bankrupt was summarised by Justice Thomas,

Mr Taylor's creditors, Mr and Mrs Greenwood, obtained a summary judgment against Mr Taylor on 17 April 1991 for $21,448.86. The summary judgment application had not been opposed. The judgment sum represented unpaid rent and outgoings for which Mr Taylor and his wife were liable under a lease which they had taken from Mr and Mrs Greenwood. The lease related to business premises occupied by Mr and Mrs Taylor's company. Sensitive readers liable to be easily disturbed should look the other way when I recite that the company went by the awful name of "Bath and Dunny Shop Limited". As befits its name it went down the drain, and it is now in liquidation.

Following judgment, Mr and Mrs Greenwood were unable to obtain repayment of any part of their judgment debt. They sought execution against Mr and Mrs Taylor's assets, including their real property, but the assets and property proved worthless, and there was no equity available for them or any other unsecured creditors. Consequently, on 16 March last, Mr and Mrs Greenwood issued a bankruptcy notice against Mr Taylor. It was renewed on 16 April 1992 and was finally served on Mr Taylor on 16 May.

== Judgment ==
The debtor, Mr Taylor, made an application in opposition to a bankruptcy notice. Although Taylor had no technical grounds on which to oppose the notice, Justice Thomas held,

For my part, I consider that adjudicating a person bankrupt when that person is essentially a victim of the current downturn in this country’s economy may, in certain circumstances, be unnecessarily severe. In Mr Taylor’s case I believe that the collapse of his business can be directly traced to the political and economic developments which took place at the time. But for those developments, Mr and Mrs Taylor would probably have a thriving business today. Bankruptcy will not now realise one cent in the dollar for Mr and Mrs Greenwood. Moreover it is difficult to perceive any public interest element which would be served by making Mr Taylor bankrupt. He cannot get a job and it is unlikely that he will get credit. To make Mr Taylor bankrupt would be purely punitive and serve no practical or useful purpose.

The only question, therefore, is whether the issue of bankruptcy should be left to be finally decided at the hearing of the petition, should Mr and Mrs Greenwood decide to pursue that course, or whether I should stay the proceeding now.... I therefore propose to grant a stay. In the event that Mr and Mrs Greenwood obtain evidence that Mr and Mrs Taylor’s fortunes have changed for the better it would be open to them to apply to the Court to uplift this stay. The debt as Mr and Mrs Taylor will appreciate, remains due and owing.

== Significance ==
The rule in Re Taylor is codified in the Insolvency Act 2006 which states that a court may at its discretion refuse to adjudicate a debtor bankrupt if "it is just and equitable that the court does not make an order of adjudication".
