= Ann Adams =

American artist

Ann Adams drawing a picture, 1972

Ann Adams (1926-1992) was an American artist who, after becoming almost fully paralyzed due to poliomyelitis, re-learned to draw by using a pencil held in her mouth.

== Early life ==
Adams was born in Jacksonville, Florida, and had a sister, Margaret. At age 19, Adams married a Navy officer. Their only child, a son named Kenneth, was born two years later.

== Illness ==
At age 24, in 1950, Adams contracted polio after the Georgia/Florida game where she caught a chill after crossing the river in a boat that night. The last time her sister saw her move was that night as she danced with her brother-in-law to Glenn Miller. She was an art major before getting married at Florida State University and had started art school in Jacksonville in 1950. She was working at the shipyard in Jacksonville at the time when she became ill. The disease totally destroyed and paralyzed all but a few facial and neck muscles. She spent a year and a half in a hospital in Jacksonville and another year and a half in a rehabilitation center in North Carolina. After this, Adams spent five years, spending up to 24 hours a day, inside an iron lung due to her inability to breathe on her own. Polio does not destroy the nerves so she still had feeling through her body.

Her husband was unable to cope with Adams' disability, divorcing her three years after contracting the illness and he received primary custody of their son due to her hospitalization. Her parents cared for her during this time, and the March of Dimes (then the National Foundation for Infantile Paralysis) provided financial and medical assistance. Under the care of the Central Carolina Convalescent Hospital, she lay in a rocking bed which helped her body, paralyzed from the neck down, breathe. Her mind was alert and she was given an adaptive device invented by Frank Reck and made by a dentist, Dr. Coble, that allowed her to type letters using her mouth. She was also fitted with an electric typewriter and given a page turner, made by Harry Doll of Western Electric Company, so that she could read a book by herself.

The Southeastern Respiration and Rehabilitation Center in Augusta, Georgia, provided Adams with a corset breathing device, where a rubber bag mimicked the negative pressure needed to breathe so that she could spend four hours a day where she was free of the iron lung; additionally, the center had a unique rocking bed and mouth hose device that allowed her to sleep normally, which meant that she could spend twelve hours a day outside the iron lung. Despite this freedom, it was eight years before she was able to return to artistic pursuits. She told her sister Margaret that the "positive Pressure" machine allowed her to embrace her art again and allowed her to express herself. Margaret says Ann is the bravest person she has ever known.

== Artistic career ==
Ann Adams, Winter Birds, made between 1958 and 1992

After she was able to sit up in a wheelchair with a breathing device, she trained herself to draw using a pencil held between her teeth with a mouth grip. An adjustable easel was set up to hold her paper and a tray for paints. She finished her first drawing of a chapel in the woods ten years after getting polio. Each of her works of art took about two months to complete. She made drawings and paintings that were used in Christmas cards, like Madonna and Child. She also made drawings for other greeting cards and was nationally known for that work. Some of the drawings included landscapes, puppies, and kittens. The drawings were printed and sold through her mail-order business.

By 1972, she supported herself with her artwork, living in her own home, and traveling with a portable iron lung. She required constant care and was still spending her nights in an iron lung. She was still working in 1990. She encouraged other people with disabilities and enjoyed reading, listening to music, and cooking.

== Conversion to Roman Catholicism ==
Adams was born in a Presbyterian family, but in 1956 converted and was baptized into the Roman Catholic Church.
