= Judith Potter =

New Zealand judge

The Honourable Dame Judith Potter DNZM CBE
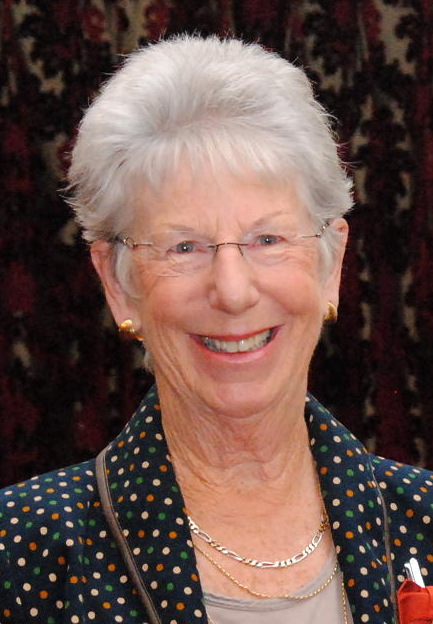
- Potter in 2013

Justice of the High Court
- In office 1997–2012

Personal details
- Born: 23 August 1942 (age 84) Auckland, New Zealand
- Relatives: Philip Ernest Potter (father)
- Education: University of Auckland

Dame Judith Marjorie Potter DNZM CBE (born 23 August 1942) is a former High Court judge in New Zealand.

== Early life ==
Potter was born in the Auckland suburb of Mount Albert on 23 August 1942, the daughter of Winifred Marjorie Potter (née Hall) and Philip Ernest Potter, who served as mayor of Mount Roskill between 1950 and 1953. She spent much of her childhood in Mount Roskill and Epsom. She was educated at Epsom Girls' Grammar School, before studying at the University of Auckland from 1960 to 1964, graduating with a Bachelor of Laws degree in 1965. In 1964, Potter joined the law firm Wallace, McLean, Bawden & Partners.

== Career ==
Potter became a senior partner at law firm, Kensington Swan. She is the former President of the Auckland District Law Society and was the first woman president of the New Zealand Law Society, holding the position from 1991 to 1994.

On 20 March 1997 Potter was appointed as a judge of the High Court of New Zealand Potter has presided over several high-profile cases in her 15 years on the bench. One such case which prompted a rebuke from the United Nations Human Rights Committee was the criminal conviction of twelve-year-old Emelysifa Jessop for aggravated robbery. In 1998, Potter convicted and sentenced the girl to 4 years. When this conviction was overturned on grounds the judge had convicted Miss Jessop despite her not entering a plea, Potter presided over the retrial and sentenced the girl to 4 years and eight months.

Her previous roles include director of the Electricity Corporation, a director of the New Zealand Guardian Trust Company, chairwoman of the Broadcasting Standards Authority and a member of the Securities Commission.

In 2000 Potter issued an influential ruling balancing the rights of those alleging harassment and the rights of freedom of expression in Beadle v Allen. In 2007 Potter jailed website editor Vince Siemer for his continual breaches of a High Court injunction. Potter has been criticised in the media for sentences which were considered excessively lenient.

On 31 December 2012 Potter retired from the bench in New Zealand and accepted an appointment to the High Court of the Cook Islands. Potter was the second woman to become a judge in the Cook Islands following Christine Grice.

== Honours ==
In 1990, Potter received the New Zealand 1990 Commemoration Medal, and in 1993 she was awarded the New Zealand Suffrage Centennial Medal.

In the 1994 New Year Honours, Potter was appointed a Commander of the Order of the British Empire, for services to the legal profession, and became Judith Potter CBE. On 20 March 1997, on her appointment to the High Court of New Zealand, she became The Honourable Justice Judith Potter CBE. On 27 August 2012, Potter was granted the right to retain the title of "The Honourable" for life, in recognition of her service as a judge of the High Court of New Zealand.

In the 2013 New Year Honours, Potter was appointed a Dame Companion of the New Zealand Order of Merit, for services to the judiciary, and became The Honourable Justice Dame Judith Potter DNZM CBE.

== See also ==
- First women lawyers around the world
