= Russell McVeagh =

New Zealand national law firm

- Headquarters: Auckland, New Zealand
- No. of offices: 2
- No. of lawyers: 250+
- No. of employees: 400+
- Major practice areas: Competition, Corporate, Employment, Finance, Litigation, Property, Resource Management, Public Law and Tax
- Key people: Allison Arthur-Young (Chair), Jo Avenell (CEO)
- Date founded: 1863; 163 years ago
- Founder: John Benjamin Russell
- Website: www.russellmcveagh.com

Russell McVeagh is a New Zealand law firm with offices in Auckland and Wellington. It is one of New Zealand's largest law firms and is ranked highly by law firm ranking guides such as The Legal 500 and Chambers and Partners.

== History ==
John Benjamin Russell (1834–1894) established a one-man practice in Auckland in 1863. Various partners joined him before he was succeeded at the firm by his son Edward Robert Nolan Russell (1869–1939) in 1893.

In 1904 Robert McVeagh became a partner and remained involved in the firm until his death in 1944. In 1969 the firm merged with McKenzie & Bartleet to become Russell McVeagh McKenzie Bartleet & Co, the name it held until 2000, when it became known simply as "Russell McVeagh".

In 1988 the firm established its Wellington office with four founding partners. It is on the panel of lawyers who are instructed by the New Zealand government to undertake legal work.

Historically the firm was considered one of New Zealand's "Big Three" law firms, along with Chapman Tripp and Bell Gully, but in 2014 it was noted that this term was becoming less frequently used, with other law firms approaching them in size and scale.

It was reported on 14 October 2021 that Russell McVeagh intended to require all staff, clients, and visitors to be fully vaccinated against COVID-19. Chief executive Jo Avenell said that many people were concerned about contacting unvaccinated people and that from 1 November 2021 all visitors would have to have received both vaccinations.

=== 2018 criticism and subsequent cultural changes ===
In 2018 the firm was criticised in the media for its handling of sexual assault allegations, levelled against two senior male lawyers. It was alleged that those lawyers engaged in non-consensual and consensual sexual acts with female intern students. These allegations led all the six university law schools in New Zealand to cut ties with Russell McVeagh.

In 2018, the firm ordered an external investigation into the allegations of sexual assault and harassment. Dame Margaret Bazley was engaged to lead the inquiry into the claims of sexual harassment and assault. Bazley's report was published in July 2018. She found that the firm had a "work hard, play hard" culture that involved excessive drinking and in some cases inappropriate behaviour, but that this culture had changed over the past couple of years. She also found failings in the firm's response to the incidents and made 48 recommendations for improvement, which were accepted by the firm. The president of the New Zealand Law Society, Kathryn Beck, said the report was an "important milestone in shining light into the dark corners of our profession" and that she hoped it would help improve the culture of New Zealand law firms. As of May 2019, the New Zealand law schools were re-evaluating whether they could resume a recruitment relationship with the firm.

In February 2020, the firm said it had addressed the "majority" of Bazley's recommendations, including introducing a whistleblower service and a "speak-up" policy, but did not specifically comment on whether it had introduced a 10-year change implementation plan, a sexual harassment and sexual assault policy or a bullying policy. Steph Dyhrberg, convenor of the Wellington Women Lawyers' Association, said she was disappointed by the response.

In December 2020, CEO Jo Avenell said the firm had taken steps to address the issue of junior lawyers working long hours including by ensuring that workloads were better spread around the firm. In February 2021, the firm said it had addressed nearly 95% of Bazley's recommendations, including introducing a whistleblower service and a "speak-up" policy, but some remained as works-in-progress.

== Notable alumni ==
Supreme Court judge Stephen Kós was a litigation partner at Russell McVeagh from 1988 to 2005 and practised in commercial, equity and environmental litigation. He was appointed as a High Court judge in 2011, as a Court of Appeal judge in 2015, president of the Court of Appeal in 2016, and as a Supreme Court judge in 2022.

Court of Appeal judge Sarah Katz was the senior litigation partner at Russell McVeagh before her appointment to the High Court in 2012. She was appointed to the Court of Appeal in 2022.

Former Court of Appeal judge Lynton Stevens was a partner at Russell McVeagh from 1980 to 1992. He was appointed as a Queen's Counsel in 1997, as a High Court judge in 2006 and as a Court of Appeal judge in 2010. He retired in 2016 and subsequently led the inquiry into the Havelock North water contamination crisis.

The first legal job of the future politician Winston Peters after graduating in law in 1974 was with Russell McVeagh; he stayed until 1978 before leaving to become a politician.

Other notable alumni include:

- Tom Ashley, Olympic Gold medallist in windsurfing (employed until 2016)
- Rebecca Edwards, High Court judge (employed as a senior solicitor 1998–2003)
- Sally Fitzgerald, High Court judge (partner 2007–2016)
- Charlotte Kight, netballer (previously employed)
- Gerard van Bohemen, High Court judge and diplomat (previously employed as a senior solicitor)
- Christian Whata, High Court judge (partner 2001–2011)

== Community support ==
Russell McVeagh supports a range of different charities and organisations through pro bono work. Its work has included supporting community law centres, representing Lecretia Seales and representing organisations like the Breast Cancer Research Trust. In 2021, Russell McVeagh assisted RainbowYOUTH on its merger with OuterSpaces. In 2022, the firm said it had undertaken over $1m of pro bono hours over the last three years.

In 2018, the firm was criticised for claiming on its website that it provided ongoing pro bono work for the charity Women's Refuge when its work had been limited to one-off work for a single refuge two years previously. The charity accepted the firm's explanation that this was in error.

== Rankings ==
Russell McVeagh has achieved high rankings in law firm ranking guides in various fields, including banking and finance, competition and antitrust, corporate and M&A,capital markets, dispute resolution, project development, real estate, restructuring and insolvency, tax, and technology, media and telecommunications (TMT).
