= Solicitor-General (New Zealand) =

New Zealand law officer

The Solicitor-General is the second law officer of state in New Zealand. The Solicitor-General is also the chief executive of the Crown Law Office, that comprises lawyers employed to represent the Attorney-General in court proceedings in New Zealand. The current Solicitor-General is Anna Adams.

Under section 9A of the Constitution Act 1986 the Solicitor-General can exercise almost all of the statutory functions conferred on the Attorney-General. As the non-political Law Officer, the Solicitor-General has traditionally assumed responsibility for the exercise of those functions that should be undertaken independently of the political process. The Crown Law Office supervises the prosecution of major criminal offences, with most prosecutions being conducted by regional law firms that act as Crown Solicitors.

== History ==
New Zealand has had its own Attorney-General since 1841 and the position of Solicitor-General was established in 1867 which was initially a political office as it currently is in England. In 1875, the office became a permanent government position. Walter Scott Reid was the first to hold the position. He remained in the position for the next 25 years. During this period the roles and responsibilities of the Attorney-General and the Solicitor-General were the subject of some debate and clarification by the Supreme Court.

In 1854 the General Assembly introduced a bill to establish, among others, the position of Solicitor-General. James O'Neill opposed the establishment of the position because each Province had its own Solicitor and thought that they together with the Attorney-General were sufficient. Whether the position was established is difficult to determine. Papers in 1854 refer to Henry Sewell as the late Solicitor-General, yet his biography says he was Attorney-General. Also, in 1861 reference is made of William Travers being offered the position, but Travers had not been in office since 1859.

When William MacGregor was appointed judge in 1923, the Attorney-General, Francis Bell discontinued the office of Solicitor General, with the tasks to be carried out by the Principal Law Officer, to which office Arthur Fair was appointed. Fair was eventually appointed Solicitor-General in May 1925, and at the same time, he was made a King's Counsel.

The current Solicitor-General is Una Jagose, who was appointed in February 2016. Jagose was a former acting head of the Government Communications Security Bureau (GCSB) and prior to that had spent two years as Deputy Solicitor, Crown Legal Risk at Crown Law. Her predecessor was Michael Heron KC, who was appointed in July 2012. Heron is a former partner of Meredith Connell (the firm that holds the Crown Prosecution warrant in Auckland) and more recently, Russell McVeagh. In turn, his predecessor was Dr David Collins KC, who was appointed as a judge of the High Court in March 2012. There has been a usual practice of appointing the Solicitor General as a judge of the High Court, although former Solicitor-General Terrence Arnold's predecessor, John McGrath KC, was appointed to the Court of Appeal in July 2000 (Justice McGrath was subsequently appointed to the Supreme Court in May 2005. Justice Arnold was appointed to the Supreme Court in June 2013).

== List of solicitors-general ==
	Name	Portrait	Term
Political office (1867–1875)
1	John Hyde Harris		1867–1868
Civil office (since 1875)
2	Walter Scott Reid		1875–1900
3	Frederick Fitchett		1901–1910
4	John Salmond		1910–1920
5	William MacGregor		1920–1923
6	Arthur Fair		1925–1934
7	Henry Cornish		1934–1945
8	Herbert Evans		1945–1956
9	Richard Wild		1957–1966
10	John White		1966–1970
11	Richard Savage		1970–1980
12	Paul Neazor		1980–1989
13	John McGrath		1989–2000
14	Terence Arnold		2000–2006
15	David Collins		2006–2012
16	Michael Heron		2012–2016
17	Una Jagose		2016–2026
18	Anna Adams		from 11 May 2026
