= Auckland Metropolitan College =

Location
- 16 Ngauruhoe Street, Mount Eden, Auckland, New Zealand; 36.882143°S 174.759853°E

Information
- Type: state, co-educational, alternative secondary school
- Motto: Dare to be different
- Established: 1977
- Status: Auckland Girls' Grammar School Eden Campus
- Closed: 2001

Auckland Metropolitan College was a state coeducational alternative secondary school located in the suburb of Mount Eden in Auckland, New Zealand. It was not compulsory for students to attend classes. The school was widely viewed negatively, particularly when numerous children expelled from other schools were sent to the school

After 8 years of critical ERO reports the school was closed in 2001 by the Minister of Education Trevor Mallard.

== See also ==
- Auckland Girls' Grammar School
