= Walter Scott Reid =

Solicitor-General of New Zealand

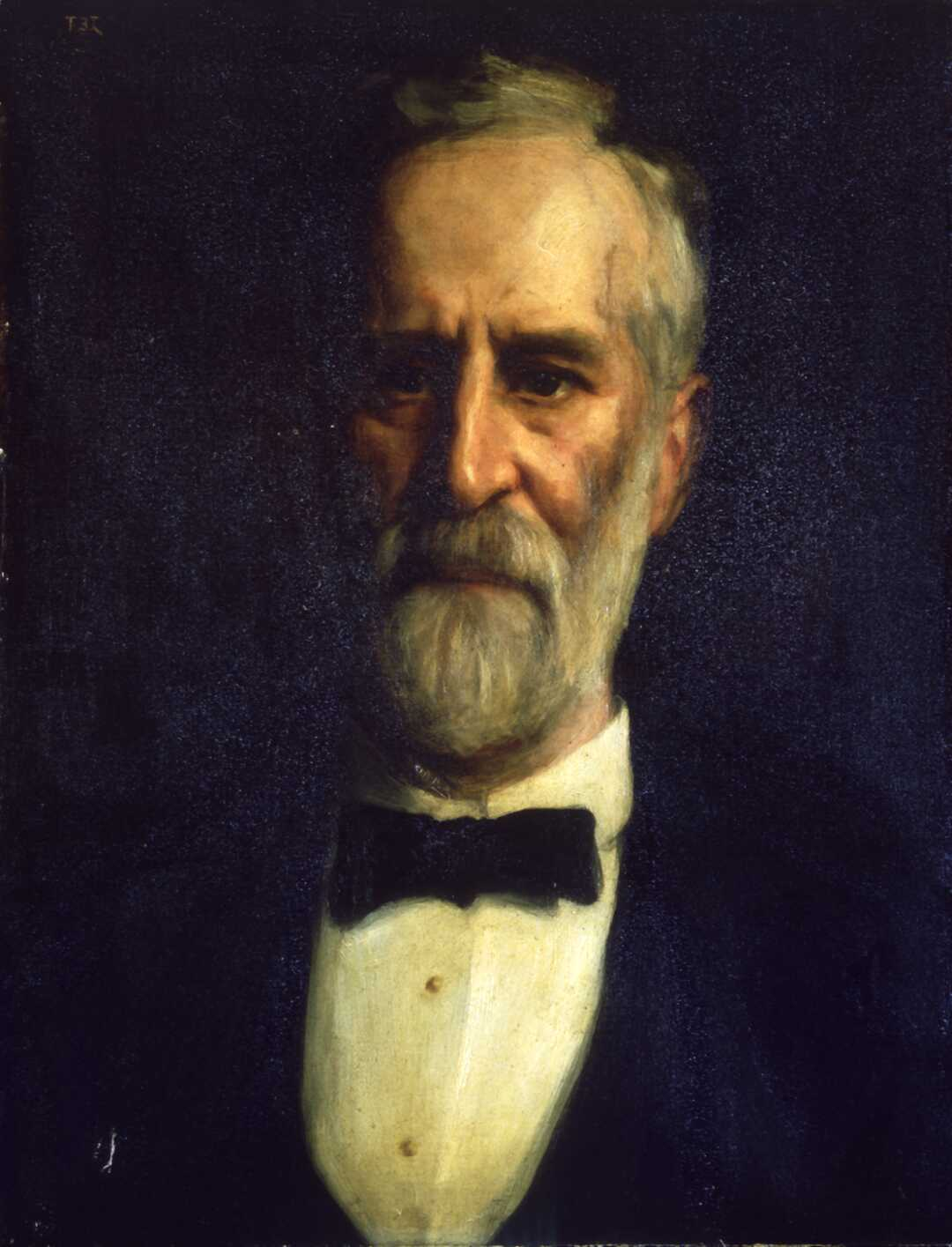
- Reid in c. 1880

Solicitor-General of New Zealand
- In office 1 April 1875 – 1900
- Preceded by: inaugural office holder
- Succeeded by: Frederick Fitchett

Personal details
- Born: 25 October 1839 Edinburgh, Scotland
- Died: 31 January 1920 (aged 80) Wellington Central, Wellington, New Zealand
- Spouse(s): Mary Jane Hume (m. 1865; died 1875) Emma Halse (m. 1895–1920)
- Profession: Barrister

Walter Scott Reid (25 October 1839 – 31 January 1920) was New Zealand's first non-political Solicitor-General and the first elected president of the New Zealand Law Society.

== Early life ==
Reid was born in 1839 in Edinburgh, Scotland. His father, Captain James Reid, was an army officer in the 45th Regiment. In the early 1840s, James was posted to Victoria, Australia, where some of Walter's siblings were born. In 1852, Captain Reid was posted to Launceston, Tasmania, where Walter Scott Reid finished his schooling. Reid commenced work for the law firm Douglas & Dawes and received his qualification as barrister and solicitor in 1862.

== Life in New Zealand ==
=== Professional career ===
By June 1864, Reid had moved to New Zealand and was working as clerk for Charles Button in Invercargill. Button had also been trained at Douglas & Dawes in Launceston and had emigrated to Invercargill in 1863. From July 1865, Reid worked as a solicitor in Wellington in partnership with Button and Patrick Buckley, with his office in Manner Street, but this partnership was dissolved shortly after on 30 September 1865. He then had an office on the corner of Willis Street and Custom House Quay.

At the beginning of 1866, Reid was appointed Registrar of Deeds in Invercargill. In August 1866, Reid's Invercargill household possession were put up for auction as he was leaving Southland permanently. By October 1866, he was in Hokitika in partnership with Button and Orbell Oakes.

=== Political career and community involvement ===
Reid was elected to the Board of Education and by 1868, he was the chairman. He was elected to the Permanent Hospital Committee in June 1869. In 1870, he was re-elected onto the committee of the Literary Society and became Vice-President under Henry Harper as president.

Reid first stood for election in the County of Westland in December 1870 in the Hokitika electorate. Four candidates stood for two positions, and Reid topped the poll, with James Bonar the second successful candidate. In Aprilo 1871, Reid accepted the position of the government's first law officer in Wellington. He resigned his position on the County of Westland on 27 April 1871 and Conrad Hoos won the resulting by-election. He arrived in Wellington on 8 May on the Alhambra.

James Prendergast had been Attorney-General since 1865. When Prendergast was appointed Chief Justice on 1 April 1875, the Attorney-General position was left vacant. To compensate for this, Reid was promoted to Solicitor-General on 1 April 1875; this was the first time that the role was non-political and Reid became the second Solicitor-General. Before him, John Hyde Harris had held this role as a political appointment during the second Stafford Ministry in 1867 and 1868. Reid was to hold this role until 1900. While he was Solicitor-General, no Attorney-General was in place for the first eighteen months and the last five years, during which periods Reid was thus the Crown's senior law officer. One of his first tasks in the role was to draft the Abolition of Provinces Act 1875 that abolished the system of provincial governments, and this established him as a constitutional law expert.

== Family ==
Reid returned from Invercargill to marry Mary Jane Hume at Launceston on 1 June 1865. She died on 7 October 1875, aged 30. Their only daughter, Minnie Ethel Reid, married William Richard Symons (1861–1906) in March 1893; he was the manager of W. and G. Turnbull and Company's shipping department.

Reid's second marriage was to Emma Halse on 16 February 1895 at the Wellington Cathedral of St Paul. They both died in 1920 at their home in The Terrace in Wellington Central; he on 31 January and she on 21 August. Reid in his two wives are buried at Bolton Street Memorial Park.
