= Robert McVeagh =

New Zealand lawyer

Robert McVeagh (22 September 1866 – 30 May 1944) was a New Zealand lawyer. He was born in Maungakawa, Waikato, New Zealand on 22 September 1866. McVeagh attended Cambridge public school at the age of 15 and from there he went on to the Cambridge office of the law firm of Frederick Whitaker and John Sheehan.
