= Una Jagose =

New Zealand lawyer

Una Jagose KC
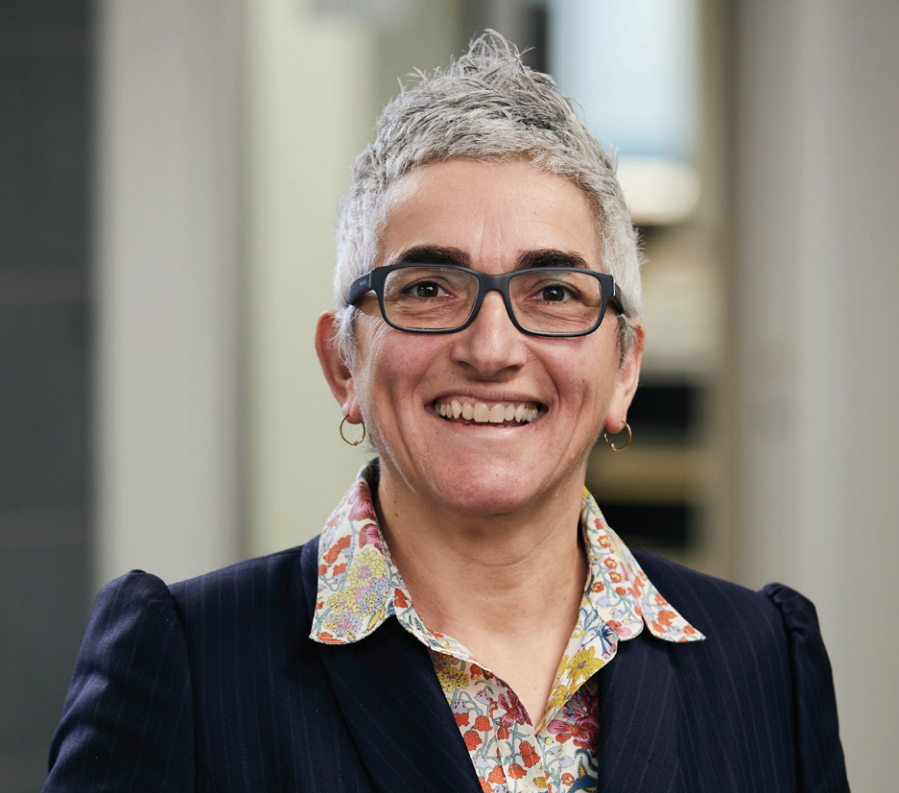

Solicitor-General of New Zealand
- In office February 2016 – 11 May 2026
- Preceded by: Michael Heron
- Succeeded by: Anna Adams

Personal details
- Born: Cambridge, New Zealand
- Education: University of Otago; Victoria University of Wellington

Una Jagose KC is a New Zealand lawyer and King's Counsel, who served as the Solicitor-General from February 2016 to May 2026.

== Early life and education ==
Jagose was born and raised in Cambridge, New Zealand. Her parents were both medical professionals who had emigrated to New Zealand: her father was a Parsi doctor from India and her mother a nurse from Ireland.

Jagose studied law at the University of Otago, followed by an LLM at Victoria University of Wellington, graduating with first class honours.

== Public service career ==
She was admitted to the bar in 1990 and joined the Ministry of Consumer Affairs (now MBIE) before moving to the Ministry of Fisheries where she was appointed Chief Legal Advisor in 1999. Jagose joined the Crown Law Office in 2002 and was appointed Deputy Solicitor-General in 2012. She was appointed acting director of the Government Communications Security Bureau in 2015, then as the Solicitor-General in February 2016 and as a Queen's Counsel in June 2016.

In 2020, Jagose won the public policy category of the New Zealand Women of Influence Awards.

In mid October 2024, Jagose as Solicitor-General issued a new guiding document for prosecutors to "think carefully" when deciding whether to prosecute Māori individuals or individuals from other groups "disproportionately impacted" by the justice system. Jagose emphasised that the guidelines were not advocating different treatment based on ethnicity or membership of a particular group but were meant to alert prosecutors to "situations or factors that may deliver inequitable outcomes for some people in those groups." The Attorney-General Judith Collins declined to write a foreword to the guiding document, stating that the Solicitor-General issued prosecution guidelines independently while expressing disagreement with the advice and wording. Collins reiterated the Sixth National Government's commitment to equality under the law. The new guidelines were released in December 2024 and came into force from 1 January 2025.

In November 2024, Jagose apologised on behalf of Crown Law to the survivors of abuse in state care. Many survivors had called upon Jagose to resign, alleging that in cases brought against the Crown by survivor claimants she was personally complicit in withholding evidence from the police, using aggressive and re-traumatising lines of questioning, and suggesting the use of psychological stress against claimants as a legal strategy.
