= Pokuru =

- Village
- Interactive map of Pokuru
- Location in Andhra Pradesh, India
- Coordinates: 15°10′N 79°49′E
- Country: India
- State: Andhra Pradesh
- District: Prakasam
- Mandal: Voletivaripalem

Government
  - Type: Village Panchayat
  - Body: Sarpanch

Population (2011)
  - Total: 8,083

Languages
  - Official: Telugu
- Time zone: UTC+5:30 (IST)
- PIN: 523113
- Telephone code: +91–8599
- Vehicle registration: AP27

Pokuru (or Nekunampuram@Pokuru) is a village in Sri Potti Sriramulu Nellore district of the Indian state of Andhra Pradesh. It is located in Voletivaripalem mandal.

Pokuru is located at 15.10°N 79.49°E and is a part of Kandukur (Assembly constituency)
