= Robert Chambers (New Zealand judge) =

New Zealand judge and Supreme Court justice

The Honourable Sir Robert Chambers KNZM QC

Justice of the Supreme Court
- In office 1 February 2012 – 21 May 2013

Personal details
- Born: Robert Stanley Chambers; 23 August 1953 Auckland, New Zealand
- Died: 21 May 2013 (aged 59) Wellington, New Zealand
- Spouses: Claire Taylor (m. 2000, divorced) Deborah Chambers KC (m. 2004)

Robert Stanley Chambers KNZM QC (23 August 1953 – 21 May 2013) was a judge of the Supreme Court of New Zealand.

== Biography ==
After an education at King's College, Chambers attended the University of Auckland and graduated in 1975 with an LLB (Hons). He was awarded Junior and Senior Scholarships in Law, the AG Davis Scholarship and the Sir Alexander Johnston Scholarship.

Chambers became a clerk to Judges of the Supreme Court (now High Court) before attending Oxford University having been awarded Commonwealth and New Zealand Law Society Scholarships. At Oxford he was Salvesen Fellow at New College, gained High Honours and was awarded his DPhil in 1978.

Chambers returned to New Zealand and lectured in law at the University of Auckland and worked as a lawyer for the firm Wilson Henry Martin & Co. He commenced practice as a barrister sole in 1981 and was appointed Queen's Counsel in 1992 — one of the few to be appointed under the age of 40.

He was a founding member of the Arbitrators’ Institute of New Zealand in 1987, a member of the Law Commission's Evidence Sub-Committee and a member of the Council of the Legal Research Foundation.

He was a Council member of the Auckland District Law Society from 1992 to 1998, its vice-president from 1995 to 1997 and President from 1997 to 1998. He was also a Vice-President of the New Zealand Law Society from 1998 to 1999.

Chambers was appointed to the High Court in 1999 and in January 2004 appointed to the Court of Appeal.

In January 2012 Chambers was appointed to the Supreme Court and took up the post on 1 February 2012. On that last appointment the Chief Justice Sian Elias described Chambers as "born for that position".

Chambers created and contributed to guidelines and systems still applicable in the New Zealand courts today, such as flow charts for juries, the New Zealand system for assessing party and party costs (created with Fisher J), the Evidence Act and the New Zealand Law Style Guide.

On 21 May 2013, Chambers unexpectedly died in his sleep in Wellington.

Subsequently, the Governor-General Sir Jerry Mateparae announced that Chambers was to have been appointed a Knight Companion of the New Zealand Order of Merit in the 2013 Queen's Birthday Honours and that, as royal assent had been given to the appointment before Chambers' death, his knighthood took effect from 20 May 2013.

His funeral was held at the Auckland Town Hall — the first since the passing of former New Zealand Prime Minister Sir Robert Muldoon. He was buried at Purewa Cemetery in the Auckland suburb of Meadowbank.

Chambers was married twice: first to Claire Taylor until they parted amicably in 2000 and with whom he had two sons David and Christopher; and then to Deborah Chambers KC (née Tohill, married name Hollings) from 2004 until his death.

On 10 November 2016 the Minister of Justice Amy Adams announced the development of a memorial garden in honour of Chambers to be situated at the Auckland High Court.

== Contributions to legal writing ==
- Co-editor Salmond and Heuston's Law of Torts (Sweet & Maxwell, 1981).
- Chapter in "Professional Responsibility" (Legal Research Foundation, 1987).
- Stephen Todd (ed) The Law of Torts in New Zealand (Brooker's, 1991 (1st ed), 1997 (2nd ed)).
