= Crown Law Office (New Zealand) =

- Te Tari Ture o te Karauna (Māori)

Agency overview
- Formed: 1875 (Solicitor-General)
- Jurisdiction: New Zealand
- Headquarters: Level 2, Justice Centre, 19 Aitken St, Wellington; WELLINGTON 6011
- Employees: 199 FTE staff (30 June 2020)
- Annual budget: Vote Attorney-General; Total budget for 2019/20 ▲$73,379,000
- Minister responsible: Chris Bishop Attorney-General
- Agency executive: Una Jagose KC, Chief Executive and Solicitor-General
- Website: www.crownlaw.govt.nz

The Crown Law Office (Crown Law; Māori: Te Tari Ture o te Karauna) is the public service department charged with advising the New Zealand Government on legal affairs, representing the government in appellate cases, and overseeing the prosecution of criminal offences before the courts.

== Law officers of the Crown ==
The offices of the attorney-general and solicitor-general are the principal legal advisers to the New Zealand Government, and act as the Crown's representatives in court. The attorney-general is by tradition a ministerial position, and is filled by a member of parliament. The solicitor-general, since 1875, is a non-political appointee, and also serves as the chief executive of the Crown Law Office.

The positions of attorney-general and solicitor-general were established in England in 1243 and 1461 respectively. The solicitor-general was a sub-ordinate office to the attorney-general.

New Zealand has had its own attorney-general since 1841. The position of solicitor-general was not established until 1867 and was initially a political office as it currently is in England. In 1875, the office became a permanent government position, with Walter Scott Reid as the first non-political solicitor-general. He remained in the position for the next 25 years. During this period the roles and responsibilities of the attorney-general and the solicitor-general were the subject of some debate and clarification by the Supreme Court.

== Crown Law Office ==
The Crown Law Office was formed to provide legal and administrative support to the solicitor-general. Its role was mainly advisory, but did include the drafting of legislation until a separate Law Drafting Office was formed in 1907. When John W Salmond became solicitor-general in 1910, all Crown legal work and the conduct of criminal prosecutions in Wellington became the responsibility of the Crown Law Office. The Law Drafting Office ceased to be the responsibility of the solicitor-general in 1918 when it was given statutory recognition and became what is now known as the Parliamentary Counsel Office.

The main purpose of the Crown Law Office is to assist the attorney-general and the solicitor-general in carrying out their legal responsibilities and obligations. In addition to legal and administrative support, the Office is accountable for:

- supporting and assisting the Attorney General and solicitor-general in the performance of their statutory and other function as Law Officers of the Crown;
- assisting the solicitor-general with the conduct of criminal appeals;
- assisting the solicitor-general in the supervision, direction and performance of regional Crown Solicitors in their prosecution functions including administration of the Crown Solicitor's Regulations 1994; and
- providing advice on the establishment and development of legal service provision within government departments and agencies

Today, the Crown Law Office operates as a government department with the solicitor-general as its chief executive. The office has more than 70 legal staff and a similar number of support staff. The scope and range of legal work undertaken has expanded to meet the full range of activities undertaken by the government in commercial, economic and social areas.

== Role of Crown Solicitor ==
The Crown Solicitor network began in the 1920s when P S K Macassey resigned from the Crown Law Office to enter private practice. He was allowed to continue his Wellington-based criminal prosecution work. Some years later a similar arrangement was made with V R S Meredith QC, (later Sir Vincent Meredith), who later became the Crown Solicitor in Auckland.
