= New Zealand Law Society =

- Te Kāhui Ture o Aotearoa
- Established: 1869; 157 years ago
- Type: Bar association
- Legal status: Statutory body
- Purpose: National regulator of the legal profession
- Professional title: Barrister and Solicitor
- Headquarters: 17 Whitmore Street
- Location: Wellington, New Zealand
- Coordinates: 41.280938°S 174.777916°E
- Region served: New Zealand
- Members: 15,109 (2020)
- President: David Campbell
- CEO: Katie Rusbatch
- Revenue: $21.9 million (2020)
- Expenses: $24.8 million (2020)
- Website: www.lawsociety.org.nz

The New Zealand Law Society (Māori: Te Kāhui Ture o Aotearoa) is the parent body for barristers and solicitors in New Zealand. It was established in 1869, and regulates all lawyers practising in New Zealand. Membership of the society is voluntary, although any person wishing to practice law in New Zealand must obtain a practising certificate from the society. The society has 13 branch offices throughout the country. Each branch has a president and a council, which represent their members’ interests on a regional and national level.

== Structure ==
The New Zealand Law Society was established by statute in 1869. The current legislation is the Lawyers and Conveyancers Act 2006 (LCA), which came into force on 1 August 2008. The Act continues the Law Society and sets out its regulatory and representative functions and powers.

Previous legislation provided for 14 district law societies with their own statutory powers, operating in a federal structure with the Law Society. The statutory role of districts ceased on 31 January 2009 and, with the exception of Auckland, their assets and liabilities were transferred to the Law Society. From 1 February 2009, branches of the Law Society were established in all former districts, including Auckland.

The Law Society's Constitution sets out the membership, election processes and meeting procedures for the Law Society's governing bodies. The Law Society is governed by a Council and managed by a Board.

The Council comprises the president, the four vice-presidents, one member from each branch of the Law Society, the chair or president of each of the Law Society's sections, the chair or president of the New Zealand Bar Association, and a representative of the large law firm corporation. The Board acts as the executive body, managing the affairs of the Law Society and exercising most of the functions and powers of the Council under delegation. The Board comprises the president (and president-elect where applicable) and the four vice-presidents. The Board also has an independent, non-lawyer representative. It appoints members to the Law Society's law reform committees.

The Law Society is supported by its executive, under the leadership of the executive director.

== Functions ==
The regulatory functions of the Law Society are set out in s 65 of the LCA. They include controlling and regulating the practice of the profession of law in New Zealand, and assisting and promoting the reform of the law (for the purpose of upholding the rule of law and the administration of justice).

Among the Law Society's regulatory activities are:

- issuing practising certificates;
- maintaining a register of lawyers;
- making practice rules;
- law reform activities, including submissions on legislation;
- managing the Lawyers Complaints Service;
- operating a Financial Assurance scheme;
- operating a Fidelity Fund.

All lawyers are regulated, and must pay the required regulatory fees and levies.

== Membership ==
Full membership of the Law Society is voluntary, and is open to any lawyer with a current practising certificate. Associate Membership is open to those who have close links to the legal profession in New Zealand, including experienced legal executives and New Zealand lawyers who do not currently hold any practising certificate.

Membership includes access to the full range of the Law Society's representative services and the opportunity to have a say in the way the profession is regulated. Full Members of the Society may use the post-nominal letters "MNZLS", whereas Associate Members may use the post-nominal letters "Assoc.MNZLS".

== Sections ==
=== Property law section ===
The Property Law Section represents the interests of a large number of New Zealand's property lawyers by supporting its members in the development and practice of property law. The section is also active in property law reform activities.

=== Family law section ===
The Family Law Section has primary responsibility on behalf of the society in all areas of family law and has a strong and active voice in relation to such issues as Family Courts management, the independence of the Family Court, Lawyer for Child rates, legal aid rates, and education.

=== ILANZ ===
The In-house Lawyers Association of New Zealand provides advocacy, networking and education to lawyers working in private sector, public sector, academia, not-for-profit and other organisations.

=== Law reform ===
The Law Society makes submissions on many bills referred to select committee and on discussion papers from government agencies and the Law Commission. It also maintains open communication with the government on administration of justice and rule of law issues.

The Law Society's Law Reform Committee, with assistance from the specialist committees and the sections, prepares submissions on behalf of the legal profession and in the public interest.

== Lawyers complaints service ==
The Service handles all complaints about lawyers or former lawyers; incorporated law firms or former incorporated law firms; people who are not lawyers but who are or were an employee of a lawyer or an incorporated law firm.

== Communications ==
The society produces a monthly magazine, LawTalk, available in both print and digital versions, a weekly e-newsletter for all registered lawyers, LawPoints, a weekly newsletter for non-lawyers, NZLS Weekly, and Guides to the Law.

== Presidents ==
Since 1897, the office of president was elected. The first holder of the office, from 1870 to 1875, was James Prendergast upon appointment by the government.

- Walter Scott Reid (1897–1902)
- Francis Bell (1902–1918)
- Charles Skerrett (1918–1926)
- Alexander Gray (1926–1934)
- Charles Herbert Treadwell (1934–1935)
- Humphrey O'Leary (1935–1946)
- Philip Cooke (1946–1950)
- William Cunningham (1950–1954)
- Timothy Cleary (1954–1957)
- Allan Bruce Buxton (1957–1959)
- David Perry (1959–1962)
- Denis Blundell (1962–1968)
- Denis McGrath (1968–1971)
- Stanley William Wilford Tong (1971–1974)
- William Guy Smith (1974)
- Lester John Castle (1974–1977)
- Laurie Southwick (1977–1980)
- Thomas Eichelbaum (1980–1982)
- Bruce Slane (1982–1985)
- Peter Clapshaw (1985–1988)
- Graham Mitchell Cowley (1988–1990)
- Judith Potter (1990–1993)
- Austin Forbes (1993–1996)
- Ian Leslie Haynes (1996–1999)
- Christine Grice (1999–2003)
- Christopher Robert Darlow (2003–2007)
- John Marshall (2007–2010)
- Jonathan Temm (2010–2013)
- Chris Moore (2013–2016)
- Kathryn Beck (2016–2019)
- Tiana Epati (2019–2022)
- Jacque Lethbridge (2022–2022)
- Frazer Barton (2022–2026)
- David Campbell (2026-present)

== See also ==
- New Zealand Bar Association
