= New Zealand Bar Association =

- Type: Bar association
- Region served: New Zealand

The New Zealand Bar Association (NZBA) is a voluntary association of lawyers in New Zealand who practise at the independent bar as barristers and King's Counsel.

The NZBA is governed by an elected council headed by a president. James Farmer QC was president from 1991 to 1995 and again from 2004 to 2008. For 2020/2021, the president was Paul Radich QC. For 2021–2023, the president is Maria Dew KC.

== See also ==
- New Zealand Law Society
