= Lists of law schools =

This lists of law schools is organized by world region and then country.

== Africa ==
=== Egypt ===
- List of law schools in Egypt

=== Ghana ===
- Ghana School of Law

=== Liberia ===
- Louis Arthur Grimes School of Law, University of Liberia

=== Nigeria ===
- Nigerian Law School
- Edwin Clark University Faculty of Law
- Abia State University Faculty of Law
- Adekunle Ajasin University Faculty of Law
- Ahmadu Bello University Faculty of Law
- Ambrose Alli University Faculty of Law
- Anambra State University Faculty of Law
- Bayero University Faculty of Law
- Benue State University Faculty of Law
- Delta State University Faculty of Law
- Ebonyi State University Faculty of Law
- Enugu State University Faculty of Law
- Igbinedion University Faculty of Law
- Imo State University Faculty of Law
- Kogi State University Faculty of Law
- Lagos State University Faculty of Law
- Madonna University Faculty of Law
- Nnamdi Azikiwe University Faculty of Law
- Obafemi Awolowo University Faculty of Law
- Olabisi Onabanjo University Faculty of Law
- Rivers State University Faculty of Law
- University of Abuja Faculty of Law
- Ekiti State University Faculty of Law
- University of Benin Faculty of Law
- University of Calabar Faculty of Law
- University of Ibadan Faculty of Law
- University of Ilorin Faculty of Law
- University of Jos Faculty of Law
- University of Lagos Faculty of Law
- University of Maiduguri Faculty of Law
- University of Nigeria Faculty of Law
- University of Uyo Faculty of Law
- Usman Danfodiyo University Faculty of Law
- Niger Delta University Faculty of Law
- Babcock University Faculty of Law
- Nasarawa State University Faculty of Law
- Benson Idahosa University Faculty of Law
- Osun State University Faculty of Law
- Afe Babalola University Faculty of Law
- Umaru Musa Yar'adua University Katsina Faculty of Law
- Justice Fati Lami Abubakar law school, Minna

=== South Africa ===
- List of law schools in South Africa

=== Uganda ===
- List of law schools in Uganda

== United Arab Emirates ==
- Ajman University offers Bachelor of Law (LLB) and Doctor of Philosophy in Law programs.

== Asia ==
=== China ===
- List of law schools in China

=== Hong Kong ===
- List of law schools in Hong Kong

=== India ===
- List of law schools in India

=== Indonesia ===
- Padjadjaran University
- University of Indonesia
- Gadjah Mada University
- Airlangga University
- Sebelas Maret University
- Medan Area University
- Muhammadiyah University of North Sumatera
- Atma Jaya Catholic University

=== Iraq ===
- List of law schools in Iraq

=== Israel ===
- List of law schools in Israel

=== Macau ===
- List of law schools in Macau

=== Malaysia ===
- List of law schools in Malaysia

=== Myanmar ===
- Dagon University
- Mandalay University
- University of Yangon
- University of Distance Education, Yangon

=== Pakistan ===
- List of law schools in Pakistan

=== Philippines ===
- List of law schools in the Philippines

=== Singapore ===
- National University of Singapore – NUS Faculty of Law
- Singapore Management University – Yong Pung How School of Law
- Singapore University of Social Sciences – SUSS School of Law

=== South Korea ===
- Law school in South Korea

=== Sri Lanka ===
- Faculty of Law, University of Colombo
- University of Peradeniya
- Open University of Sri Lanka
- Sri Lanka Law College
- University of Jaffna

=== Taiwan ===
- List of law schools in Taiwan

=== Thailand ===
- Faculty of Law, Chulalongkorn University
- Faculty of Law, Thammasat University
- Faculty of Law, Ramkhamhaeng University
- Faculty of Law, Chiang Mai University
- Department of Law, Kasetsart University
- Faculty of Law, Khon Kaen University

=== Vietnam ===
- Ho Chi Minh City University of Law
- University of Economics, Ho Chi Minh City
- Hanoi Law University

=== Uzbekistan ===
- Tashkent State University of Law

== Australia and New Zealand ==
- List of law schools in Australia
- List of law schools in New Zealand

== Europe ==
=== Armenia ===
- Yerevan State University – Faculty of Law
- American University of Armenia
- French University in Armenia – Faculty of law

=== Austria ===
- Johannes Kepler University – Faculty of Law, Linz
- Karl-Franzens-Universität, Graz
- Universität Salzburg – Rechtswissenschaftliche Fakultät, Salzburg
- University of Innsbruck – Rechtswissenschaftliche Fakultät, Innsbruck
- University of Vienna – Rechtswissenschaftliche Fakultät, Vienna

=== Azerbaijan ===
- Baku State University, Law School

=== Belgium ===
- College of Europe – Law Department, Bruges (only postgraduate)
- Ghent University – Faculty of Law, Ghent
- Katholieke Universiteit te Leuven – Faculty of Law, Leuven
- Saint-Louis University, Brussels – Faculty of Law, Brussels
- University of Antwerp – Faculty of Law, Antwerp
- University of Hasselt – Faculty of Law, Hasselt
- University of Liège – Faculty of Law, Political Science and Criminology, Liège
- UCLouvain – Faculty of Law and Criminology, Louvain-la-Neuve
- University of Namur – Faculty of Law, Namur
- Vrije Universiteit Brussel – Faculty of Law and Criminology, Brussels

=== Bosnia and Herzegovina ===
- University of Banja Luka – Faculty of Law
- University of Mostar Faculty of Law
- University of Sarajevo Faculty of Law
- University of Tuzla – Faculty of Law

=== Croatia ===
- University of Osijek – Faculty of Law
- University of Rijeka – Faculty of Law
- University of Split – Faculty of Law
- University of Zagreb – Faculty of Law

=== Czech Republic ===
- Charles University in Prague – Faculty of Law
- Masaryk University of Brno – Faculty of Law
- Palacký University of Olomouc Faculty of Law
- University of West Bohemia – Faculty of Law

=== Denmark ===
- Copenhagen Business School – Law Department
- University of Copenhagen – Faculty of Law
- University of Aarhus – School of Law
- University of Southern Denmark – Faculty of Social Sciences, Odense
- University of Aalborg – Department of Law

=== Estonia ===
- Tallinn University of Technology Tallinn Law School
- University of Tartu – Faculty of Law
- Tallinn University – Law School

=== Finland ===
- University of Helsinki – Faculty of Law
- University of Lapland – Faculty of Law, Rovaniemi
- University of Turku – Faculty of Law
- University of Eastern Finland – Department of Law, Joensuu

=== France ===
- List of law schools in France
  - List of faculties of law in France
  - Collège de droit in France
  - Toulouse school of law

=== Germany ===
- Bucerius Law School, Hamburg
- Christian-Albrechts-Universität zu Kiel – Rechtswissenschaftliche Fakultät
- EBS Universität für Wirtschaft und Recht - EBS Law School
- Freie Universität Berlin
- Friedrich-Alexander-Universität – Law School, in Erlangen and Nuremberg
- Friedrich-Schiller-Universität – Rechtswissenschaftliche Fakultät
- Gottfried Wilhelm Leibniz Universität Hannover – Faculty of Law
- Heidelberg University Faculty of Law, University of Heidelberg
- Heinrich Heine University – Faculty of Law, Düsseldorf
- Humboldt University of Berlin
- Institute for Law and Finance, Frankfurt
- Johann Wolfgang Goethe-Universität – Fachbereich Rechtswissenschaft, Frankfurt
- Johannes Gutenberg University of Mainz – Faculty of Law
- Julius Maximilian University of Würzburg – Juristische Fakultät
- Justus-Liebig-Universität – Department of Law, Giessen
- Leipzig University – Faculty of Law
- LMU Munich
- Martin-Luther-Universität Halle-Wittenberg – Juristische und Wirtschaftswissenschaftliche Fakultät
- Philipps-Universität Marburg
- Ruhr Law School – Non-academic education centre
- Ruhr-Universität Bochum – Juristische Fakultät
- Ruprecht-Karls-Universität Heidelberg – Juristische Fakultät
- Universität Augsburg – Law School
- Universität Bayreuth – Rechtswissenschaften Fakultäten
- Bielefeld University – Faculty of Law
- Universität Bremen – Fachbereich Rechtswissenschaft
- Universität des Saarlandes – Faculty of Law and Economics
- Universität Trier – Rechtswissenschaft
- University of Bonn
- University of Cologne
- University of Freiburg
- University of Göttingen
- University of Greifswald Faculty of Business and Law, Greifswald
- University of Hagen – Faculty of Law
- University of Hamburg
- Universität Konstanz – Faculty of Law, Economics and Politics
- Universität Mannheim – Fakultät für Rechtswissenschaft und Volkswirtschaftslehre
- University of Münster
- University of Osnabrück – Faculty of Law
- University of Passau – Faculty of Law
- University of Potsdam – Faculty of Law
- Universität Regensburg – Juristische Fakultät
- University of Rostock – Faculty of Law
- University of Tübingen – Faculty of Law

=== Greece ===
- National and Kapodistrian University of Athens – School of Law
- Aristotle University of Thessaloniki – Faculty of Law
- Democritus University of Thrace – Department of Law

=== Hungary ===
- Central European University- Legal Studies Department, Budapest
- Eötvös Loránd University – Faculty of Law, Budapest
- University of Miskolc – Faculty of Law
- University of Szeged – Faculty of Law
- University of Debrecen – Faculty of Law
- Károli Gáspár University of the Reformed Church in Hungary – Faculty of Law
- Pázmány Péter Catholic University – Faculty of Law and Political Sciences
- University of Pécs – Faculty of Law
- Széchenyi István University – Deák Ferenc Faculty of Law and Political Sciences

=== Iceland ===
- University of Reykjavik – School of Law
- University of Iceland – Faculty of Law

=== Ireland ===
- List of law schools in the Republic of Ireland

=== Italy ===
Region (city)	School	Type	Founded	Campus
Abruzzo (Teramo & Avezzano)	University of Teramo	Public	1993	Rural
Calabria (Catanzaro)	Magna Græcia University	Public	1998	Rural
Calabria (Rende)	University of Calabria	Public	1972	Rural
Calabria (Reggio Calabria)	Mediterranea University of Reggio Calabria	Public	2001	Urban
Campania (Benevento)	University of Sannio	Public	1998	Small Town
Campania (Fisciano)	University of Salerno	Public	1968	Suburban
Campania (Napoli)	Parthenope University of Naples	Public	1930	Urban
Campania (Napoli)	Suor Orsola Benincasa University of Naples	Public/Private	1895	Urban
Campania (Napoli)	University of Naples Federico II	Public	1224	Urban
Campania (Santa Maria Capua Vetere)	Università degli Studi della Campania Luigi Vanvitelli	Public		Suburban
Emilia-Romagna (Bologna) (Ravenna)	University of Bologna	Public		Urban
Emilia-Romagna (Ferrara)	University of Ferrara	Public	1391	Urban
Emilia-Romagna (Modena)	University of Modena and Reggio Emilia	Public		Urban
Emilia-Romagna (Parma)	University of Parma	Public		Urban
Emilia-Romagna (Piacenza)	Catholic University Milan	Private		Urban
Friuli-Venezia Giulia (Trieste)	University of Trieste	Public		Urban
Friuli-Venezia Giulia (Udine)	University of Udine	Public		Urban
Lazio (Cassino)	University of Cassino and Southern Lazio	Public		Small Town
Lazio (Roma)	European University	Private		
Lazio (Roma)	Libera Università Internazionale degli Studi Sociali Guido Carli	Private		Urban
Lazio (Roma)	Libera Università Maria SS. Assunta	Private		Urban
Lazio (Roma)	Link University	Private		
Lazio (Roma)	Roma Tre University	Public		Urban
Lazio (Roma)	Sapienza University of Rome	Public		Urban
Lazio (Roma)	University of Rome Tor Vergata	Public		Urban
Lazio (Viterbo)	Tuscia University	Public	1979	Small Town
Liguria (Genova)	University of Genoa	Public		Urban
Lombardia (Milan)	Bocconi University School of Law	Private		Urban
Lombardia (Bergamo)	University of Bergamo	Public		Urban
Lombardia (Brescia)	University of Brescia	Public		Urban
Lombardia (Castellanza)	University Carlo Cattaneo	Private		Suburban
Lombardia (Milan)	Catholic University Milan	Private		Urban
Lombardia (Milan)	University of Milano-Bicocca	Public		Urban
Lombardia (Milan)	University of Milan	Public		Urban
Lombardia (Pavia)	University of Pavia	Public		Urban
Lombardia (Varese & Como)	University of Insubria	Public		Urban
Marche (Camerino)	University of Camerino	Public		College Town
Marche (Macerata)	University of Macerata	Public		College Town
Marche (Urbino)	University of Urbino	Public		College Town
Molise (Campobasso)	University of Molise	Public		
Piemonte (Alessandria)	University of Eastern Piedmont	Public		Urban
Piemonte (Turin) (Biella)	University of Turin Department of Law	Public	1436	Urban
Puglia (Bari) (Taranto)	University of Bari	Public		Urban
Puglia (Casamassima)	Libera Università Mediterranea Jean Monnet	Private		
Puglia (Foggia)	Università degli studi di Foggia	Public		
Puglia (Lecce)	University of Salento	Public		
Sardegna (Cagliari)	University of Cagliari	Public		Urban
Sardegna (Sassari)	University of Sassari	Public		Urban
Sicilia (Catania)	University of Catania	Public		Urban
Sicilia (Enna)	Kore University of Enna	Public/Private		
Sicilia (Messina)	University of Messina	Public		Urban
Sicilia (Palermo)	Libera Università Maria SS. Assunta	Private		
Sicilia (Palermo e Trapani)	University of Palermo	Public		Urban
Tuscany (Florence)	University of Florence	Public		Urban
Tuscany (Pisa) (Livorno)	University of Pisa	Public		Urban
Tuscany (Siena)	University of Siena	Public		Urban
Trentino-Alto Adige (Trento)	University of Trento	Public		Urban
Umbria (Perugia)	University of Perugia	Public		Urban
Veneto (Padova) (Treviso)	University of Padua	Public		Urban
Veneto (Rovigo)	University of Ferrara	Public		
Veneto (Verona)	University of Verona	Public	1982	Urban

=== Kosovo ===
- University of Gjilan – Faculty of Law (Gjilan)
- Haxhi Zeka University – Faculty of Law (Peja)
- University of Mitrovica – Faculty of Law (Mitrovica)
- University of Pristina – Faculty of Law (Pristina)
- University of Priština (North Mitrovica) – Faculty of Law (North Mitrovica)
- University of Prizren – Faculty of Law (Prizren)

=== Latvia ===
- List of law schools in Latvia

=== Lithuania ===
- List of law schools in Lithuania

=== Luxembourg ===
- Université de Luxembourg – Département de Droit

=== Malta ===
- University of Malta – Faculty of Laws
- International Maritime Law Institute (IMLI)

=== Montenegro ===
- University of Montenegro Faculty of Law (Podgorica, Budva, Bijelo Polje)
- University "Mediterranean" – Faculty of Law (Podgorica)

=== Netherlands ===
- Amsterdam Law School
- Erasmus University Rotterdam – School of Law
- Hague Academy of International Law – The Hague
- Leiden University – Faculty of Law
- Maastricht University – Faculty of Law
- Radboud University Nijmegen – Faculty of Law
- Tilburg University – Faculty of Law
- University of Amsterdam – Faculty of Law
- University of Groningen – Faculty of Law
- Utrecht University – Faculty of Law
- Vrije University Amsterdam – Faculty of Law

=== North Macedonia ===
- European University Skopje – Faculty of Law (Skopje)
- FON University – Faculty of Law (Skopje)
- Goce Delčev University of Štip – Faculty of Law (Skopje)
- Ss. Cyril and Methodius University of Skopje – Faculty of Law
- International University of Struga (Struga)
- State University of Tetova – Faculty of Law (Tetovo)

=== Norway ===
- University of Bergen – Faculty of Law
- University of Oslo – Faculty of Law
- University of Tromsø – Faculty of Law

=== Poland ===
- List of law schools in Poland

=== Portugal ===
- University of Coimbra
- Portuguese Catholic University, Lisbon and Porto
- University of Lisbon
- University of Minho, Braga
- University of Porto
- New University of Lisbon
- Universidade Lusíada de Lisboa
- Universidade Lusófona de Humanidades e Tecnologias
- Universidade Portucalense Infante Dom Henrique, Porto

=== Russia ===
- Academic Law University under the auspices of the Institute of State and Law, Russian Academy of Sciences
- Bashkir State University – Institute of Law
- Baikal State University of Economics and Law
- Chelyabinsk State University – Faculty of Law
- Finance University under the Government of the Russian Federation – Faculty of Law
- Higher School of Economics – Faculty of Law
- Institute of Legislation and Comparative Law
- Irkutsk State University – Faculty of Law
- Kazan Federal University – Faculty of Law
- Khabarovsk State Academy of Economics and Law
- Kutafin Moscow State Law University
- Moscow State Institute of International Relations – International Law School
- Moscow State University Faculty of Law
- Novosibirsk State University – Institute for the Philosophy and Law
- Petrozavodsk State University – Faculty of Law
- Russian Peoples' Friendship University – Faculty of Law
- Russian Presidential Academy of National Economy and Public Administration – Institute of Law and National Security
- Russian State University for the Humanities – Faculty of Law
- Russian School of Private Law
- Ryazan State University – Faculty of Law
- Saint Petersburg State Polytechnical University – Faculty of Law
- Saint Petersburg State University, Faculty of Law
- Saratov State Academy of Law
- Siberian Federal University – Institute of Law
- State University of Management – Institute of Public Administration and Law
- South Ural State University – Faculty of Law
- Tomsk State University – Institute of Law
- Tyumen State University – Faculty of Law
- Ural State Law University
- Voronezh State University – Faculty of Law

=== Serbia ===
- Belgrade Law School
- Novi Sad Law School
- Niš Law School
- University of Kragujevac, Faculty of Law
- Union University, Faculty of Law (Belgrade)
- Megatrend University, Faculty of Law (Belgrade)

=== Slovakia ===
- List of law schools in Slovakia

=== Slovenia ===
- University of Ljubljana – Faculty of Law
- University of Maribor – Faculty of Law

=== Spain ===
- University of Castilla–La Mancha – Facultad de Derecho, Albacete
- Universidad de Allicante – Facultad de Derecho, San Vicente del Raspeig
- Universidad Autonoma de Barcelona – Facultat de Dret
- Universitat de Barcelona – Facultat de Dret
- Universitat Pompeu Fabra – Facultat de Dret, Barcelona
- Universidad de Deusto – Facultad de Derecho, Bilbao
- Universidad de Extremadura – Facultad de Derecho, Cáceres
- Universitat Jaume I – Facultat de Ciències Jurídiques i Econòmiques, Castelló
- Universidad de Cordoba – Facultad de Derecho
- Universidad del Pais Vasco – Facultad de Derecho, Donostia / San Sebastián
- Universitat de Girona – Facultat de Dret
- Universidad de Granada – Facultad de Derecho
- Universidad de Cadiz, Facultad de Derecho, Jerez de la Frontera
- Universidade da Coruña – Facultad de Dereito
- Universidad de La Laguna – Facultad de Derecho
- Universidad de Las Palmas de Gran Canaria – Facultad de Ciencias Jurídicas, Las Palmas
- Universidad de León – Facultad de Derecho
- Universitat de Lleida – Facultad de Derecho
- Universidad Autonoma de Madrid – Facultad de Derecho, Madrid
- Universidad Carlos III de Madrid – Facultad de Derecho
- Universidad Complutense de Madrid – Facultad de Derecho, Madrid
- Universidad de Alcalá – Facultad de Derecho, Madrid
- Universidad Nacional de Educacion a Distancia – Facultad de Derecho
- Universidad Pontifica de Comillas – Facultad de Derecho
- Universidad de Malaga – Facultad de Derecho
- Universidad Miguel Hernández – Facultad de Ciencias Sociales y Jurídicas, Elche
- Universidad de Murcia – Facultad de Derecho
- University of Navarra School of Law, Pamplona
- Universidade de Vigo – Facultad de Derecho, Orense
- Universidad de Oviedo – Facultad de Derecho
- Universitat de les Illes Balears – Facultat de Dret, Palma, Spain
- Universidad Rey Juan Carlos – Facultad de Ciencias Jurídicas y Sociales, Madrid; Móstoles; Fuenlabrada; Aranjuez
- Universitat Rovira i Virgili – Facultad de Ciencias Jurídicas, Tarragona
- Universidad de Salamanca – Facultad de Derecho, Salamanca
- Universidad de Cantabria – Facultad de Derecho, Santander, Spain
- Universidade de Santiago de Compostela – Facultade de Dereito
- Universidad de Sevilla – Facultad de Derecho
- Universidad Pablo de Olavide – School of Law, Sevilla
- Universitat de Valencia – Facultad de Derecho
- Facultad de Derecho de la Universidad de Valladolid
- Universidad de Zaragoza – Facultad de Derecho

=== Sweden ===
- List of law schools in Sweden

=== Switzerland ===
- Graduate Institute of International and Development Studies, Geneva (only Postgraduate)
- Universität St.Gallen – Law School
- Universität Basel – Juristische Fakultät
- Universität Bern – Rechtswissenschaftliche Fakultät
- Université de Fribourg / Universität Freiburg – Faculté de droit / Rechtswissenschaftliche Fakultät
- Université de Genève – Faculté de droit
- Université de Lausanne – Faculté de droit, des sciences criminelles et d'administration publique
- Universität Luzern – Rechtswissenschaftliche Fakultät
- Université de Neuchâtel – Faculté de droit
- Universität Zürich – Rechtswissenschaftliche Fakultät

=== Turkey ===
- List of law schools in Turkey

=== Ukraine ===
- List of law schools in Ukraine

=== United Kingdom ===
- List of law faculties in the United Kingdom

== Latin America and the Caribbean ==
=== Bahamas ===
- University of the West Indies – Eugene Dupuch Law School

=== Barbados ===
- University of the West Indies

=== Brazil ===
- List of law schools in Brazil

=== Cayman Islands ===
- Cayman Islands Law School (School of Law)

=== Chile ===
- Universidad de Chile – Facultad de Derecho
- Pontificia Universidad Católica de Chile – Facultad de Derecho
- Universidad Adolfo Ibañez – Facultad de Derecho

=== Costa Rica ===
- Universidad de Costa Rica (School of Law)
- Universidad Autónoma de Centro América (School of Law)
- Universidad de San José (University with a Faculty of Law)

=== Ecuador ===
- Pontificia Universidad Católica del Ecuador (School of Law)
- Universidad Catolica Santiago de Guayaquil (School of Law)
- Universidad Central del Ecuador (School of Law)
- Universidad de Especialidades Espíritu Santo (School of Law)
- Universidad San Francisco de Quito (College of Law)
- Universidad Del Pacifico – Ecuador (School of Law)

=== Jamaica ===
- University of the West Indies – Norman Manley Law School

=== Panama ===
- Universidad Latinoamericana de Ciencia y Tecnología (School of Law)

=== Trinidad and Tobago ===
- University of the West Indies – Hugh Wooding Law School

== North America ==
- List of law schools in Canada
- List of law schools in the United States
- List of law schools in Mexico

== See also ==
- Legal education
- Lists of universities and colleges
- Madrasa
