= Francisco Samper Polo =

Chilean jurist

Francisco Samper

Personal details
- Born: 20 June 1932 (age 93); Valparaíso, Chile
- Spouse: Sonia Alejandra Inostroza Adasme (m. 2016)
- Education: Instituto Rafael Ariztía
- Alma mater: Pontifical Catholic University of Valparaíso (BA); University of Navarra (PhD)
- Profession: Lawyer

Francisco Samper Polo (born 20 June 1932) is a Chilean lawyer and scholar, a specialist in Roman Law.

== Biography ==
Samper completed his primary and secondary studies at the Instituto Rafael Ariztía (IRA) in Quillota, belonging to the Marist Brothers. Later, he studied Law at the Pontifical Catholic University of Valparaíso, where he graduated on 21 December 1961.

Once graduated, Samper went to Spain to do a Ph.D. in-laws at the University of Navarra School of Law, a degree he obtained on 30 June 1965. His doctoral thesis was directed by the prominent Spanish jurist Álvaro d'Ors. Similarly, Samper's work obtained summa cum laude qualification, the highest scholar score.

He has taught at numerous universities, both in Spain and Chile, including Navarra (1963), Santiago de Compostela (1970), Valladolid (1973), Palma de Mallorca (1978), where was also dean from 1978 to 1980. Similarly, at the University of Cantabria, he was founding dean of the Faculty of Law in Santander (1982−1985).

Despite Samper definitely settling in his country after 1985, he began to teach at the Pontifical Catholic University of Chile (PUC) since 1980. At the PUC he was the head of its Doctorate in Law, (2008). Samper also taught lessons at the following universities: Andrés Bello (UNAB), Gabriela Mistral, SEK, Adolfo Ibáñez (UAI), Universidad de los Andes, Bernardo O'Higgins and Santiago de Chile (USACh).

In 2017, Alejandro Guzmán Brito presented his book Las Instituciones de Gayo (2017).

== Works ==
=== Books ===
- Derecho Romano (2007)
- Las Instituciones de Gayo (2017)
