= List of law schools in Israel =

This is a list of law schools in Israel.

== Universities ==
There are six university faculties of law at the following Israeli universities:

- Bar-Ilan University (BIU) — Yaakov Herzog Faculty of Law, Ramat Gan
- University of Haifa (HAI) — Faculty of Law, Haifa
- Hebrew University of Jerusalem (HUJI) — Faculty of Law, Mount Scopus, Jerusalem
- Tel Aviv University (TAU) — Buchmann Faculty of Law, Tel Aviv
- Reichman University — Harry Radzyner School of Law, Herzliya
- Ariel University — Faculty of Law, Ariel

== Colleges ==
In addition, the following Israeli academic colleges operate accredited law schools:

- College of Law and Business, Ramat Gan
- College of Management Academic Studies, Rishon LeZion
- Netanya Academic College, Netanya
- Ono Academic College, Kiryat Ono
- Academic Center for Science and Law, Hod HaSharon
- Zefat Academic College, Safed
- Sapir Academic College, Sderot
- Peres Academic Center, Rehovot
- Carmel Academic Center, Haifa

== Bar examination pass rates ==
All graduates of Israeli law schools must pass the Israel Bar Association's written qualifying examination (bechinat hahasmacha) in order to be licensed to practice law. The examination is administered twice yearly, in summer (typically June or July) and winter (typically December), by a Committee of Examiners (Va'adat Bohanot) appointed by the Minister of Justice under Amendment 38 to the Bar Association Law (2016).

Pass rates fell sharply following the 2016 amendment, reaching a historic low in November 2016 with an overall pass rate of approximately 30% (raised to 37% after appeals). Structural reforms in 2017 introduced a new three-part exam format, and in November 2018 the passing score was lowered from 65 to 60. Pass rates have since fluctuated, generally between 32% and 62%, and have been affected by disruptions from the Israel-Hamas war (from October 2023) and the Israel-Iran war (June 2025).

The Bar Association publishes detailed pass-rate statistics after each sitting, broken down by institution, by number of times the examinee has taken the exam, and by location of internship. Graduates of the six accredited university law faculties consistently outperform graduates of college law schools by a margin of approximately 30 to 50 percentage points.

=== Recent sittings: overall results ===
Israel Bar Association qualifying examination: overall results, 2022–2025
Sitting	Examinees	First-time examinees	Overall pass rate	First-time pass rate	Avg. score
December 2025	2,953	2,056	52.3%	67.7%	59.2
July 2025	2,599	1,771	59.5%	77.8%	61.5
December 2024	2,270	1,371	32.4%	49.0%	53.2
September 2024	1,863	1,012	59.9%	82.4%	61.9
June 2024	2,156	1,259	—	68.2%	—
February 2024	1,754	1,058	54.7%	75.2%	60.7
April 2024	770	101	16.2%	57.4%	50.5
June 2023	1,957	1,221	49.5%	71.0%	59.2
December 2022	2,188	1,386	62.0%	79.0%	63.0
June 2022	1,506	597	43.0%	64.0%	57.5

Source: Israel Bar Association press releases.

For earlier sittings, the Bar Association reported overall pass rates of approximately 53% in December 2020, 34% in August 2020 (raised to approximately 55% following successful appeals), 48% in winter 2019, and 54% in July 2019 (2,582 examinees, 67% first-time pass rate).

=== First-time pass rates by institution ===
The Bar Association reports first-time pass rates as the primary indicator of institutional performance, since overall pass rates are weighted by repeat examinees who have accumulated from previous unsuccessful attempts. The following table shows first-time pass rates and (in parentheses) the number of first-time examinees from each institution across six recent sittings.

First-time pass rates by institution, 2022–2025 (first-time examinees in parentheses)
Institution	Jun 2022	Dec 2022	Feb 2024	Sept 2024	Jul 2025	Dec 2025
Hebrew University of Jerusalem	95% (25)	96% (105)	100% (74)	98.0% (98)	96.0% (126)	95.9% (145)
Tel Aviv University	100% (34)	94% (146)	97.4% (121)	98.6% (141)	96.9% (161)	86.6% (112)
Bar-Ilan University	100% (24)	98% (88)	95.0% (65)	93.8% (81)	92.6% (148)	91.7% (120)
University of Haifa	100% (15)	98% (47)	94.3% (36)	94.1% (34)	89.6% (48)	90.9% (44)
Reichman University	85% (58)	87% (32)	93.8% (23)	91.7% (24)	82.4% (34)	87.6% (275)
College of Management	91% (67)	88% (187)	90.3% (88)	93.3% (135)	89.9% (198)	86.6% (194)
Sapir Academic College	93% (33)	91% (66)	89.2% (44)	90.5% (42)	79.6% (54)	73.8% (61)
Peres Academic Center	54% (23)	81% (66)	92.9% (63)	80.0% (50)	86.5% (89)	53.6% (28)
Zefat Academic College	64% (27)	84% (36)	66.7% (19)	70.0% (10)	75.0% (28)	44.0% (25)
Academic Center for Science and Law	53% (154)	74% (205)	63.0% (119)	73.9% (46)	69.9% (83)	56.3% (96)
Netanya Academic College	36% (131)	73% (176)	72.5% (138)	64.3% (70)	66.7% (165)	52.3% (128)
Ono Academic College	60% (560)	68% (649)	60.1% (597)	66.5% (212)	64.5% (484)	49.9% (655)
College of Law and Business	48% (165)	53% (183)	61.9% (169)	55.4% (65)	70.8% (120)	55.0% (129)
Carmel Academic Center	0% (37)	0% (40)	50.0% (21)	—	0.0% (1)	0.0% (3)

Source: Israel Bar Association press releases. Italics denote university faculties of law. Bold figures denote the leading institution by first-time pass rate in that sitting.

=== Average scores by institution ===
The Bar Association also publishes the average score (out of 100; passing threshold 60) achieved by each institution's examinees. Average scores diverge meaningfully from pass-rate rankings in some sittings, as a small number of examinees just below the threshold can shift the pass rate substantially while the underlying score distribution remains stable.

Average scores by institution, all first-time examinees, recent sittings
Institution	Dec 2022	Feb 2024	Sept 2024	Jul 2025	Dec 2025
Hebrew University	73.7	72.7	74.7	72.7	70.9
Tel Aviv University	74.8	73.7	73.7	72.1	69.3
Haifa University	74.5	73.6	71.9	70.3	68.0
Bar-Ilan University	73.1	72.3	71.1	71.4	70.1
Reichman University	69.4	69.8	66.7	65.8	67.1
College of Management	69.5	69.0	71.2	69.7	67.6

Source: Israel Bar Association press releases. Bold figures denote the highest average score in that sitting.

=== Patterns ===
Several patterns recur across the documented sittings:

- University–college gap. Graduates of the six accredited university faculties of law consistently outperform graduates of college law schools by 30 to 50 percentage points. In the December 2025 sitting, universities recorded a collective pass rate of 87.5% compared with 43.2% for colleges.
- Leadership among universities. The Hebrew University of Jerusalem and Tel Aviv University have alternated at the top of the institutional table. Tel Aviv University recorded the highest first-time pass rate of any institution in June 2022 (100%), September 2024 (98.6%), and July 2025 (96.9%), and the highest average score among all institutions in December 2022, February 2024, September 2024, and July 2025. The Hebrew University led the table by first-time pass rate in December 2022 (96%) and December 2025 (95.9%).
- Top college performance. Among colleges, the College of Management Academic Studies has consistently been the strongest performer, with first-time pass rates approaching or exceeding 90% in most documented sittings and average scores comparable to mid-tier universities.
- Examinee volume. Ono Academic College is consistently the single largest source of examinees — 800 in December 2024, 1,047 in December 2025, and 822 in July 2025 — despite below-average pass rates, reflecting its very large undergraduate law program.
- Carmel Academic Center. Records the lowest pass rates in most published sittings, with 0 of 18 first-time examinees passing in July 2025 and 0 of 3 in December 2025, despite very small examinee numbers.

== See also ==
- Israel Bar Association
- Council for Higher Education of Israel
- Education in Israel
- Legal profession in Israel
