= San Esteban de Deyo =

Coordinates: 42.6339°N 2.1064°W

Aerial view of Deio

San Esteban de Deyo, also called the Castillo de Monjardín, is a ruined castle on a hill overlooking Villamayor de Monjardín in Navarre. The castle lies at an elevation of 890 metres. The castle has a Roman foundation, but was repeatedly rebuilt over the centuries. It was one of the last fortresses of the Banu Qasi, the local Muslim dynasty, before it was taken by King Sancho I of Navarre in 914. According to the Historia Caroli Magni et Rotholandi—a legendary retelling of the lives of Charlemagne and Roland found in the 12th-century Codex Calixtinus—the castle was actually taken by Charlemagne from a Navarrese prince named Furré. Only the walls of the castle stand today. Many of the stones were taken to build a Baroque hermitage, the Ermita de San Esteban, in the 17th century.

The ruins of San Esteban de Deyo were named a Bien de Interés Cultural de Navarra on 25 June 1985.

== Gallery ==
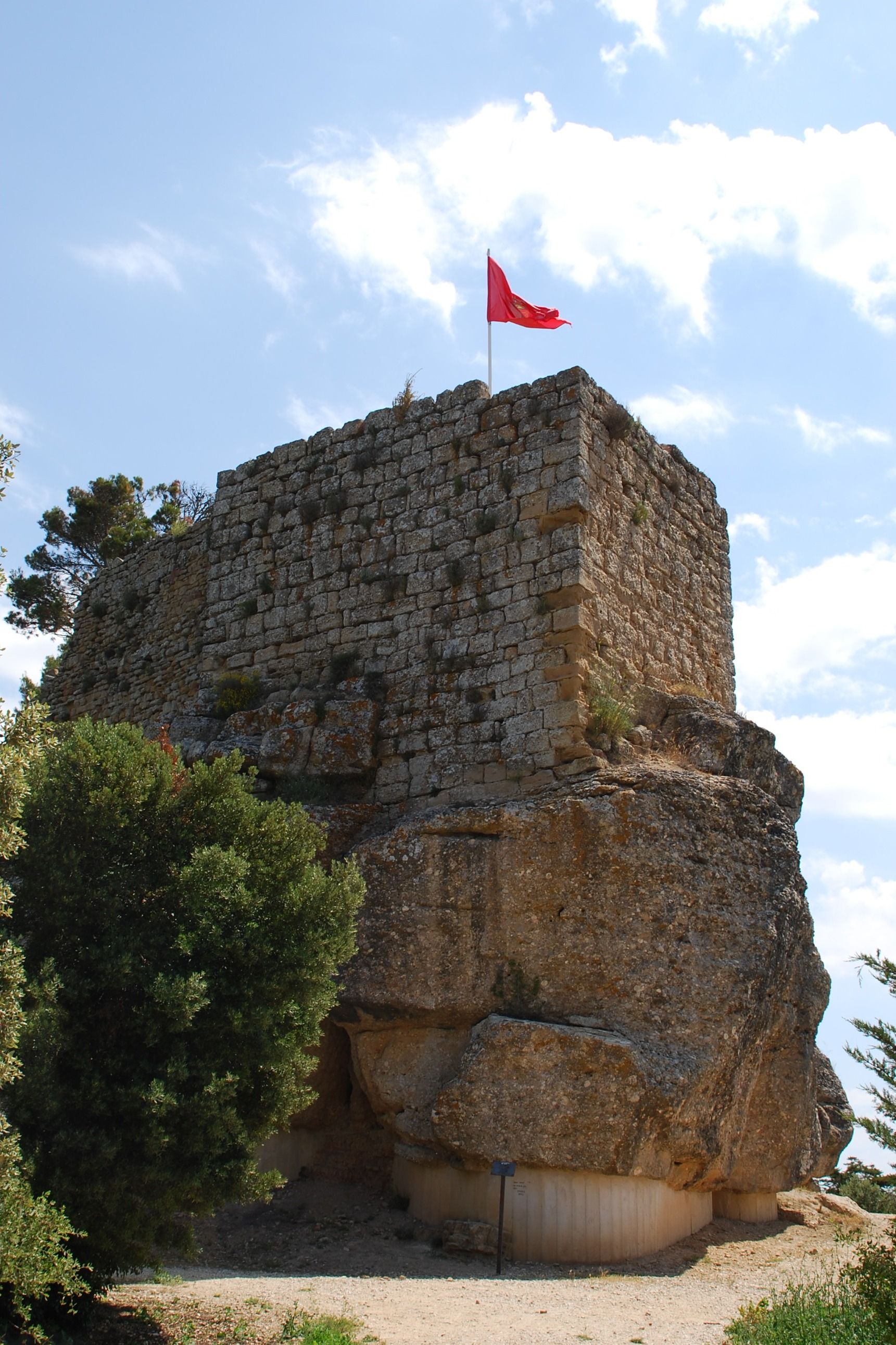
Well-preserved corner tower of the exterior wall

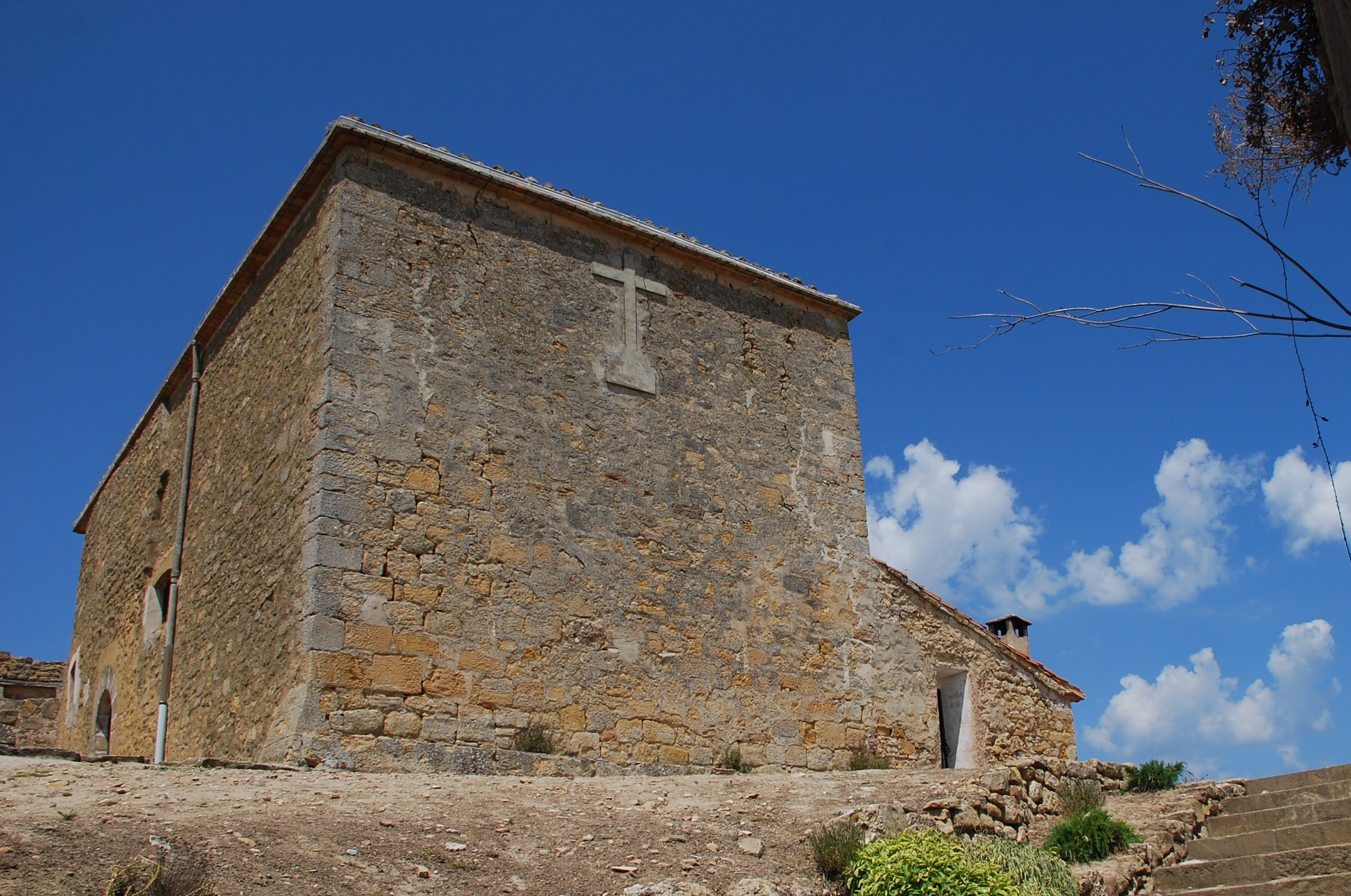
Baroque hermitage constructed from the castle's stones

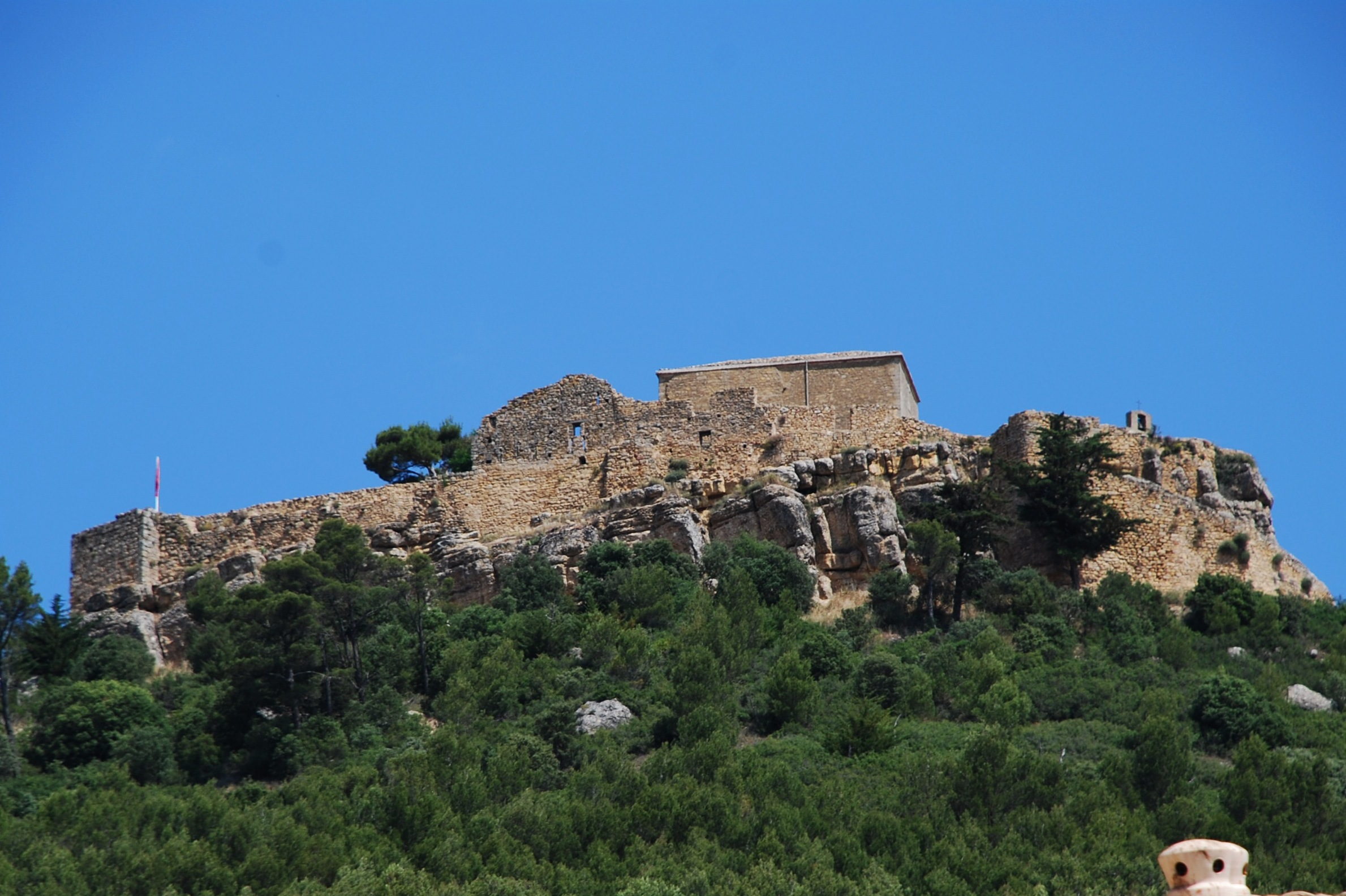
Panorama of the surviving exterior wall

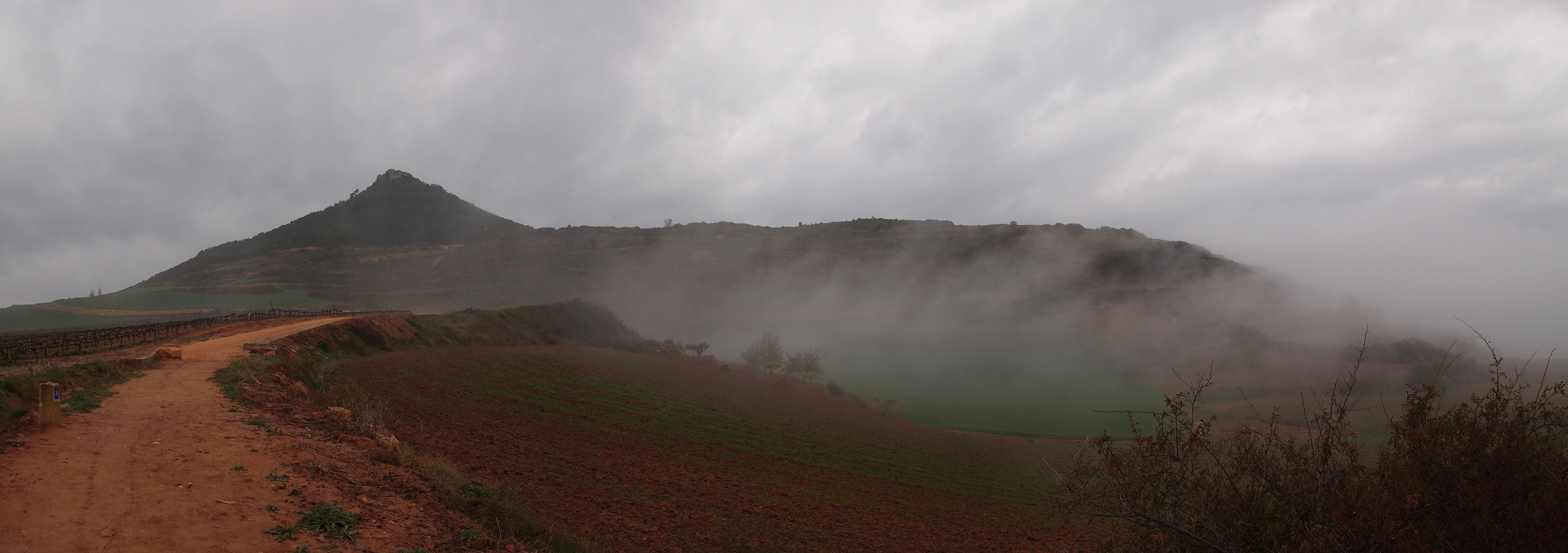
The castle, atop the hill on the left, would have dominated the landscape in the 10th century
