= Group of Eight (Australia) =

Coalition of Australian tertiary institutions

- Formation: 1999
- Type: Nonprofit organisation
- Headquarters: Canberra, ACT
- Location: Australia
- Members: Adelaide University; Australian National University; Monash University; University of Melbourne; University of New South Wales; University of Queensland; University of Sydney; University of Western Australia
- Website: www.go8.edu.au

The Group of Eight (Go8 or G8) comprises Australia's most research intensive universities (in alphabetical order) – Adelaide University, the Australian National University, Monash University, University of Melbourne, University of New South Wales, University of Queensland, University of Sydney, and University of Western Australia. It is often compared to the Russell Group of research universities in the United Kingdom.

== Overview ==
The Go8 universities are some of the largest and the oldest universities in Australia and are consistently the highest ranked of all Australian universities. Seven of the Go8 members are ranked in the world's top 100 universities and all Go8 members are ranked in the world's top 150 universities; in the Academic Ranking of World Universities, the Times Higher Education World University Rankings, the QS World University Rankings and the U.S. News & World Report. Go8 Universities feature in the top 50 for every broad subject area in the QS world university subject rankings. In addition, all Go8 Universities are in the QS top 100 for Engineering and Technology, Life Sciences and Medicine, Arts and Humanities, and Social Sciences and Management.

The Go8 educates 425,000 students; educating more than one quarter of all higher education students in Australia. It graduates some 110,000 graduates each year.

The Go8 undertakes 70 per cent of Australia's university research and their research funding from industry and other non-Government sources is twice that of the rest of the sector combined.

The Go8 receives 71 per cent of Australian Competitive Grant (Category 1) funding and had the largest proportion of research fields rated at 4 or 5 ('above' or 'well above' world standard) in the latest Excellence in Research for Australia (ERA) exercise, with 99 per cent of Go8 research is world class or above. Each year the Go8 spends some $6.5 billion on research – more than $2.4 billion of which is spent on Medical and Health Services research. Go8 universities educate more than half of Australia's doctors, dentists, vets and provide some 54 per cent of Australia's science graduates and more than 40 per cent of Australia's engineering graduates.

The Go8 Board, which consists of the vice-chancellors (who also serve as principals or presidents) of its eight member universities, meets five times a year. The current Chair of the Board is Professor Mark Scott AO, Vice-Chancellor and President of The University of Sydney, appointed in 2024. Vicki Thomson is the Chief Executive of the Group of Eight, taking up the role in January 2015.

== Members ==
University	City	Established	International Rankings								
University	City	Established	Average	QS World (2027)	THE World (2027)	US News (2026-2027)	ARWU World (2026)	Scimago (2026)	URAP (2026)	NTU (2026)	Leiden (2026) (Note: Measured by the impact indicator P (top 1%), ordered by P (top 1%) using core publications only and fractional counting. Leiden Ranking Open Edition. Data from 2021-2024.)
University of Melbourne	Melbourne	1853	28.5	22=	34=	28=	37	30	23	17	37
University of Sydney	Sydney	1850	38.5	28	51=	31	79	39	21	21	38
Monash University	Melbourne	1958	43.5	31	61	38=	76	40	29	28	45
University of New South Wales	Sydney	1949	48.3	19	75=	33=	81	45	31	31	71
University of Queensland	Brisbane	1909	52.8	40=	73=	42	73	54	40	37	63
Australian National University	Canberra	1946	145.8	29	77	81	101–150	228	177	153	296
University of Western Australia	Perth	1911	151.2	77=	149=	90	101–150	248	126	109	285
Adelaide University	Adelaide	1874	152.8	79	141=	85=	101–150	250	161	107	274

Equals signs (=) denote tied rankings.

== Map ==
Locations of each Group of Eight university main campus

== See also ==
- Association of American Universities – USA & Canada
- C9 League – The Chinese Ministry of Education's formal grouping of elite universities in China
- TU9, alliance of nine leading Technical Universities in Germany
- Ivy League – group of premium private universities in Northeastern United States
- Group of 8 (Go8) undergraduate law schools
- Law schools in Australia
- Universities in Australia
