= Sangüesa =

- Sangüesa / Zangoza
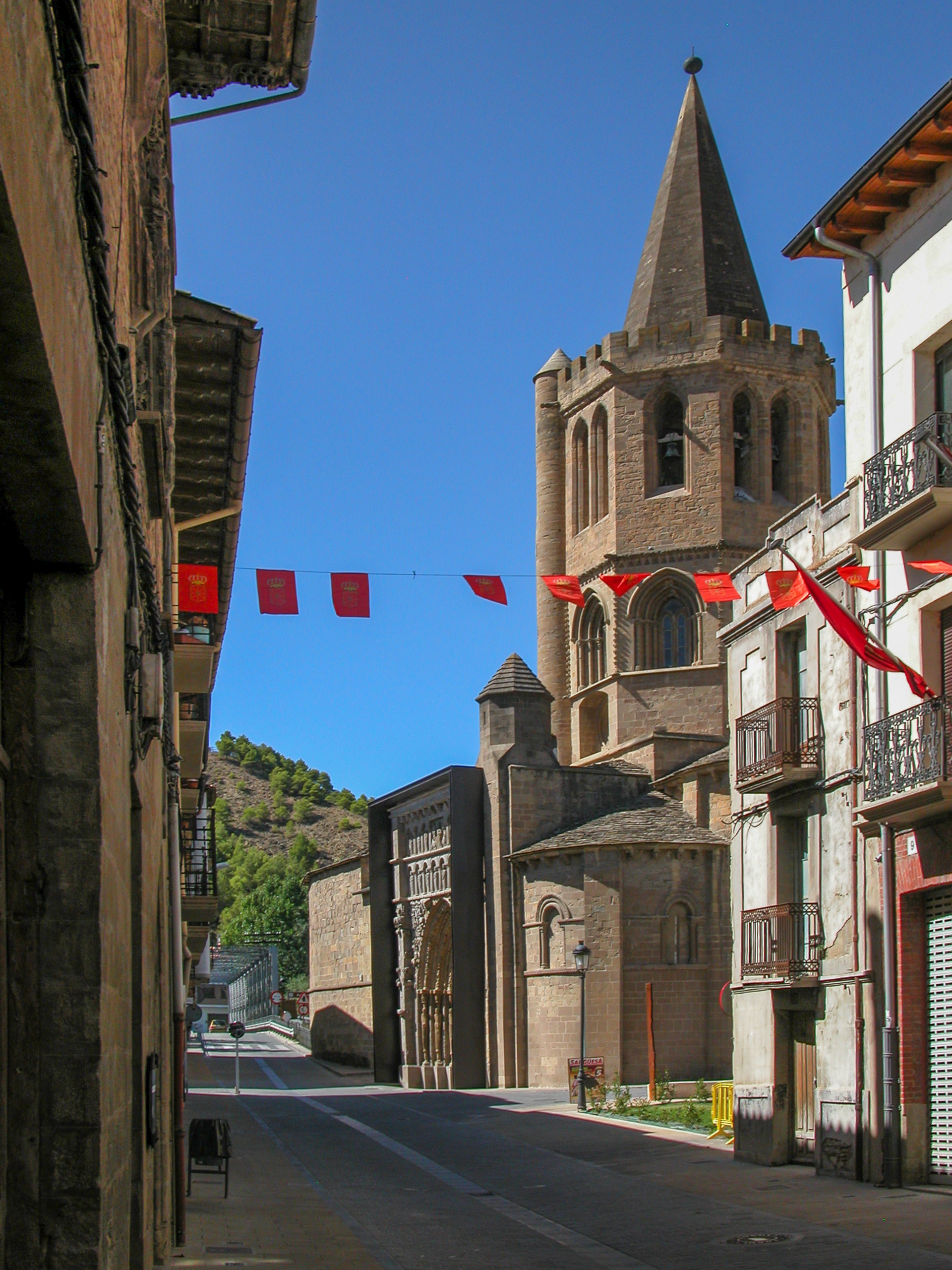
- Sangüesa, street scene

- Flag Coat of arms

- Location within Navarre Location within Spain
- Coordinates: 42°35′N 1°17′W
- Country: Spain
- Autonomous Community: Navarre
- Comarca: Merindad de Sangüesa
- Time zone: UTC+1 (CET)
  - Summer (DST): UTC+2 (CEST)

Sangüesa (Basque: Zangoza) is a city in Navarre, Spain, 44.5 kilometers from Pamplona. It lies close to the River Aragon and in 2007 had a population of 5,128. It is located on the Way of Saint James. It has been an important stopping point for pilgrims since the Middle Ages and has preserved its medieval character.

Sangüesa-Zangoza is the historic capital of one of the six merindades into which the old Kingdom of Navarre was divided.

In 1089, a bridge was built here over the River Aragon and Sancho Ramirez located the town to the present location. In 1121, Alfonso el Batallador (Alfonso the Battler) extended the fuero of Jaca to Sangüesa which significantly expanded the opportunities for Frankish merchants to settle here.

== Religious monuments ==
- Church of Santa María la Real, located on Calle Mayor. The oldest part dates from 1131. Its magnificent main façade is particularly remarkable, with its representation of the Final Judgement (built in the 12th to 13th centuries), one of the masterpieces of Navarre and Iberian Romanesque architecture.
- Church of Santiago the Elder, (12th to 13th centuries), transitional Romanesque.
- Church of San Salvador. Gothic (13th to 14th centuries).
- Convent of Saint Francis of Assisi. Founded in 1266 by Teobaldo II, and reformed in the 16th century. Contains an interesting Gothic cloister and chapter room.
- Church of the Carmen, first Carmelite convent established in Sangüesa in the 13th century. A Gothic church, it was reformed in the 16th and 17th centuries. Gothic cloister.

== Civil monuments ==
- Palace of the Dukes of Granada de Ega, urban palace of the 15th century.
- Palace of the Prince of Viana, former residence of the kings of Navarre, 13th century.
- Palace of Íñiguez de Medrano, built in the 16th century, located on Enrique de Labrit street.
- Palace of the marquises of Valle-Santoro, built in the 17th century.
- Palace of the Counts of Guendulain, typical baroque palace of the 17th century.
- Major House, built in 1570 over part of the former palace of the Kings of Navarre. Sober Renaissance facade.
- San Adrián de Vadoluengo, Romanesque building close to Sangüesa, on the way to Sos del Rey Católico.
