= List of law schools in Australia =

There are currently 38 law schools in Australia. Only one of the 39 member institutions of Universities Australia has no law school: Federation University.

== Current law schools ==
University	Law school	State/territory	City	Established	Degree(s)	Total Undergraduate Law Student Intake (2019) (Incomplete)
Australian Catholic University	Thomas More Law School	National	Blacktown, Brisbane, Melbourne and Sydney	2012	LL.B.	
Australian National University	ANU Law School	Australian Capital Territory	Canberra	1960	LL.B. (Hons), J.D., LL.M., M.Phil., and Ph.D.	~400 (rough estimate due to nonspecific number of 2019 student intake)
Bond University	Faculty of Law	Queensland	Gold Coast	1989	LL.B., J.D., LL.M., S.J.D., and Ph.D.	*38 (excl. dual degree students)
Central Queensland University	School of Business and Law	Queensland	Rockhampton/Online	2011	LL.B.	
Charles Darwin University	School of Law	Northern Territory	Darwin/Online	2003	LL.B., and LL.M.	
Charles Sturt University	Centre for Law and Justice	New South Wales	Bathurst/Online	2016	LL.B.	
Curtin University	Law School	Western Australia	Perth	2012	LL.B.	
Deakin University	School of Law	Victoria	Burwood, Melbourne and Geelong, Melbourne	1992	LL.B., J.D., LL.M., and Ph.D.	
Edith Cowan University	School of Business and Law	Western Australia	Perth/Online	2005	LL.B., LL.M., and Ph.D.	
Flinders University	College of Business, Government and Law	South Australia	Adelaide	1992	Bachelor of Laws and Legal Practice	
Griffith University	Law School	Queensland	Brisbane/Gold Coast	1992	LL.B., and J.D.	~800 (rough estimate due to nonspecific number of 2019 student intake)
James Cook University	School of Law	Queensland	Cairns/Townsville	1989	LL.B.	
La Trobe University	Law School	Victoria	Melbourne	1992	LL.B., J.D., and LL.M.	
Macquarie University	Law School	New South Wales	Sydney/External	1972	LL.B., J.D, LL.M. and Ph.D.,	
Monash University	Faculty of Law	Victoria	Clayton	1963	LL.B., LL.M., J.D., M.Phil. and Ph.D.	457
Murdoch University	School of Law	Western Australia	Perth	1992	LL.B., and LL.M.	
Queensland University of Technology	School of Law	Queensland	Brisbane/External	1977	LL.B. (Hons)	837
RMIT University	School of Law	Victoria	Melbourne/Online	2007	J.D, LL.B.(from 2021)	
Southern Cross University	Faculty of Business, Law and Arts	New South Wales	Gold Coast/Lismore/Online	1994	LL.B.,, LL.M., and Ph.D.,	
Swinburne University of Technology	Law School	Victoria	Melbourne	2015	LL.B., LL.M., and Ph.D.	
University of Adelaide	Law School	South Australia	Adelaide	1883	LL.B., and LL.M.	288
University of Canberra	Law School	Australian Capital Territory	Canberra	1993	LL.B., and LL.M.	
University of Melbourne	Law School	Victoria	Melbourne	1857	LL.M., J.D., M.Phil., and Ph.D.	N/A
University of New England	School of Law	New South Wales	Armidale/Online	1993	LL.B., and LL.M.	
University of Newcastle	Law School	New South Wales	Newcastle	1992	LL.B., LL.M., and J.D.	
University of New South Wales	Faculty of Law	New South Wales	Sydney	1971	LL.B., LL.M., J.D., and Ph.D.	~330 (rough estimate due to nonspecific number of 2019 student intake)
University of Notre Dame	Law School	Western Australia	Fremantle/Sydney	1997	LL.B.	
University of Queensland	Law School	Queensland	Brisbane	1936	LL.B., LL.M., M.Phil., Ph.D., MICLaw, and MIL.	210
University of South Australia	School of Law	South Australia	Adelaide	2007	LL.B., LL.M., Ph.D.	156
University of Southern Queensland	School of Law and Justice	Queensland	Toowoomba/Online/External	2005	LL.B., LL.M., J.D. and Ph.D.	
University of the Sunshine Coast	School of Law and Criminology	Queensland	Sunshine Coast	2012	LL.B., and Ph.D.	
University of Sydney	Law School	New South Wales	Sydney	1855	LL.B., LL.M., J.D. and Ph.D.	323
University of Tasmania	College of Arts, Law and Education	Tasmania	Hobart	1893	LL.B., LL.M. and Ph.D.	
University of Technology Sydney	Faculty of Law	New South Wales	Sydney	1975	LL.B., LL.M., J.D., and Ph.D.	~400 (rough estimate due to nonspecific number of 2019 student intake)
University of Western Australia	Law School	Western Australia	Perth	1927	B.A., LL.M., J.D., and S.J.D.	N/A
University of Wollongong	School of Law	New South Wales	Wollongong	1990	LL.B., LL.M., and Ph.D.	
Victoria University, Australia	College of Law and Justice	Victoria	Melbourne	2001	LL.B., LL.M., and Ph.D.	
Western Sydney University	School of Law	New South Wales	Sydney	1993	LL.B., and LL.M.	

There are currently 2 non-university providers who offer accredited law degrees:

- Legal Profession Admission Board
- Top Education Institute - Sydney City School of Law

There are currently 2 non-university providers who offer practical legal training:

- The College of Law Australia
- Leo Cussen Institute

== Group of 8 (Go8) undergraduate law schools ==
University	Law school	State / territory	Est.	Undergrad law intake 2019	ATAR selection threshold 2020
Australian National University	College of Law	Australian Capital Territory	1960	400~	98
University of Sydney	Law School	New South Wales	1855	323	99.5
University of Melbourne	Law School	Victoria	1857	—N/a	—N/a
University of New South Wales	Faculty of Law	New South Wales	1971	400~	ATAR & Law Admission Test (LAT)
University of Queensland	Law School	Queensland	1936	203	98
Monash University	Faculty of Law	Victoria	1963	457	98
University of Adelaide	Law School	South Australia	1883	288	95
University of Western Australia	Law School	Western Australia	1927	—N/a	—N/a

== Australian Law Schools Mooting Ranking ==
Moot court rankings are an indicator of a law school's commitment to practical legal education. They reflect the school's ability to train students in essential skills such as advocacy, legal reasoning, and oral argument. High rankings in moot court competitions suggest a strong focus on one aspect of experiential learning, which contributes to developing competent and competitive legal professionals. These rankings can serve as one benchmark for the quality of legal education and, for some, the school's ability to prepare students for real-world legal challenges.

NICA World Mooting Rankings 2013-2023, Australian Rankings are indicated inside parentheses.
University	2013	2014	2015	2016	2017	2018	2019	2020	2021	2022	2023	Avg World Ranking	Avg Australian Ranking
University of Queensland	25 (5)	1 (1)	46 (4)	22 (5)	13 (3)	1 (1)	15 (2)	10 (1)	106 (7)	41 (5)	17 (1)	27.0	3.2
Monash University	12 (3)	9 (2)	12 (2)	17 (4)	109 (9)	41 (5)	135 (5)	118 (3)	139 (10)	4 (1)	21 (2)	56.1	4.2
University of New South Wales	9 (2)	23 (3)	56 (5)	3 (1)	95 (8)	28 (2)	32 (3)	23 (2)	92 (6)	31 (4)	147 (11)	49.0	4.3
University of Adelaide	n/a	33 (4)	n/a	n/a	122 (10)	177 (8)	n/a	223 (9)	395 (14)	n/a	40 (5)	165.0	8.3
Bond University	22 (4)	66 (5)	n/a	167 (9)	11 (2)	177 (8)	200 (8)	234 (10)	75 (3)	338 (10)	54 (6)	134.4	6.5
Deakin University	n/a	83 (6)	327 (10)	165 (8)	71 (5)	328 (15)	206 (9)	234 (10)	205 (11)	252 (9)	105 (7)	197.6	9.0
Murdoch University	31 (6)	87 (7)	89 (6)	169 (10)	88 (6)	228 (12)	147 (6)	139 (5)	662 (20)	113 (6)	n/a	175.3	8.4
University of Technology Sydney	137 (9)	124 (8)	90 (7)	41 (6)	89 (7)	168 (7)	n/a	n/a	67 (2)	11 (3)	332 (15)	117.7	7.1
La Trobe University	290 (11)	145 (9)	327 (10)	285 (11)	320 (13)	260 (14)	48 (4)	118 (3)	357 (13)	649 (14)	209 (12)	273.5	10.4
Victoria University	219 (10)	145 (9)	327 (10)	428 (15)	446 (17)	199 (11)	n/a	374 (14)	n/a	n/a	n/a	305.4	12.3
Curtin University	n/a	223 (11)	n/a	n/a	n/a	n/a	n/a	193 (8)	n/a	n/a	n/a	208.0	9.5
University of Canberra	4 (1)	325 (12)	n/a	363 (13)	367 (15)	328 (15)	n/a	234 (10)	n/a	n/a	n/a	270.2	11.0
University of Sydney	124 (8)	325 (12)	4 (1)	6 (2)	6 (1)	36 (4)	12 (1)	374 (14)	3 (1)	6 (2)	28 (3)	84.0	4.5
University of Western Australia	350 (13)	352 (14)	24 (3)	n/a	n/a	n/a	n/a	n/a	395 (14)	n/a	n/a	280.3	11
Queensland University of Technology (QUT)	n/a	n/a	207 (8)	15 (3)	68 (4)	472 (17)	224 (11)	158 (7)	78 (4)	649 (14)	110 (8)	220.1	8.4
RMIT University	n/a	n/a	217 (9)	n/a	367 (15)	177 (8)	483 (13)	234 (10)	556 (18)	649 (14)	n/a	383.3	12.4
Edith Cowan University	n/a	n/a	327 (10)	428 (15)	n/a	n/a	n/a	n/a	n/a	n/a	n/a	377.5	12.5
Western Sydney University	n/a	n/a	n/a	327 (12)	306 (12)	n/a	n/a	n/a	n/a	n/a	n/a	316.5	12.0
University of Melbourne	n/a	n/a	n/a	85 (7)	n/a	n/a	n/a	n/a	134 (8)	375 (12)	328 (14)	230.5	10.3
Australian National University	45 (7)	n/a	n/a	393 (14)	n/a	107 (6)	344 (12)	n/a	395 (14)	244 (8)	141 (10)	238.4	10.1
Australian Catholic University	n/a	n/a	n/a	n/a	n/a	34 (3)	206 (9)	n/a	137 (9)	449 (13)	528 (16)	270.8	10.0
University of Tasmania	n/a	n/a	n/a	n/a	365 (14)	n/a	173 (7)	n/a	662 (20)	n/a	n/a	400.0	13.7
University of Notre Dame - Australia	n/a	n/a	n/a	428 (15)	446 (17)	472 (17)	520 (14)	139 (5)	556 (18)	649 (14)	528 (16)	467.3	14.5
Swinburne University of Technology	n/a	n/a	n/a	n/a	n/a	n/a	n/a	n/a	315 (12)	n/a	n/a	315.0	12.0
Macquarie University	n/a	n/a	n/a	n/a	231 (11)	228 (12)	n/a	n/a	79 (5)	355 (11)	34 (4)	185.4	8.6
University of Southern Queensland	n/a	n/a	n/a	n/a	n/a	n/a	n/a	n/a	395 (14)	n/a	n/a	395.0	14
Southern Cross University	n/a	n/a	n/a	n/a	n/a	n/a	n/a	n/a	662 (20)	n/a	n/a	662.0	20.0
Griffith University	n/a	n/a	n/a	n/a	n/a	n/a	n/a	n/a	n/a	649 (14)	112 (9)	376.5	11.5
University of Newcastle	n/a	n/a	n/a	n/a	n/a	n/a	n/a	n/a	n/a	239 (7)	312 (13)	275.5	10.0

The averages are calculated based on the available rankings from 2014 to 2023, available from the NICA Law School Rankings for Mooting Competitions.

The NICA rankings evaluate law schools based on their performance in moot court competitions. The rankings consider two factors: the weight of the competitions, determined by the number participating law schools, and the advancement of teams within these competitions.

UQ Law School has performed the best out of all of the law schools in Australia with respect to Moot court competitions averaging a World ranking of 27.2, and an Australia ranking of 3 from 2014 to 2023.

== See also ==
- Lists of law schools
- Australian Law Students Association
- Group of Eight law schools
