= Ron Shapira =

Israeli lawyer and professor of law

Ron A. Shapira (Hebrew: רן שפירא) is an Israeli lawyer and professor of law. He is the rector of the Peres Academic Center. In July 2024, Shapira was chosen to represent Israel as an ad-hoc judge in the International Court of Justice.

== Biography ==
Shapira was born in Tel-Aviv. His father, Chaim Shapira, was the president of the Tel-Aviv magistrate court. During his military service, Shapira served as deputy to the military advocate general Menachem Finkelstein. In 1990, Shapira started a private legal practice dealing with real estate and criminal law. In 2007 he merged his practice with that of Jacob Weinroth. He is a senior partner in the Abraham Neeman legal firm.

Between 1994 and 2000, Shapira was a senior lecturer in Tel-Aviv University as well as a visiting lecturer in Columbia University and the Cardozo Law School. In 2001, Shapira became a professor of law in Bar-Ilan University and served as the dean of the law school between 2001 and 2004. In 2008 he left Bar-Ilan to become the president of Peres Academic Center.

Between 2006 and 2014, Shapira served as a member of the Israeli public defender's committee.

After Aharon Barak chose to resign for personal reasons, in July 2024, Shapira was chosen to replace Barak as the ad-hoc Israeli representative associate judge in the International Court of Justice.

== Work ==
Shapira's areas of specialty are procedural law, evidence law, criminal law and mathematical formulae in legal doctrine. Since 1999, Shapira is an editorial board member of the journal "Law, Probability and Risk".

Shapira is a member of the advisory board of the Israel Law and Liberty Forum, and a supporter of key elements of the proposed 2023 Israeli judicial reform.

== Select publications ==
- Shapira, R. A. (1994). The Probabilistic Model of the Law of Evidence: Part One-Traditional Criticism. Tel Aviv UL Rev., 19, 205.
- Shapira, R. A. (1996). The Probabilistic Model of the Law on Evidence: Part Two-The Epistemic Logic. Tel Aviv UL Rev., 20, 141.
- Shapira, R. A. (1997). The susceptibility of formal models of evidentiary inference to cultural sensitivity. Cardozo J. Int'l & Comp. L., 5, 165.
- Shapira, R. A. (1997). Economic Analysis of the Law of Evidence: A Caveat. Cardozo L. Rev., 19, 1607.
- D Barak-Erez, R Shapira, The delusion of symmetric rights, Oxford Journal of Legal Studies, Volume 19, Issue 2, SUMMER, Pages 297–312
- Shapira, R.A. Fuzzy measurement in the Mishnah and the Talmud. Artificial Intelligence and Law 7, 273–288 (1999)
- Shapira, R.A. (2002). Fuzzy Logic and Its Application to Legal Reasoning — A Comment to Professor Zadeh. In: MacCrimmon, M., Tillers, P. (eds) The Dynamics of Judicial Proof. Studies in Fuzziness and Soft Computing, vol 94. Physica, Heidelberg
- Sagi A, Shapira R. Civil Disobedience and Conscientious Objection. Israel Law Review. 2002;36(3):181-217
- Shapira-Ettinger, Keren and Shapira, Ron A.. "The Constructive Value of Overconfidence" Review of Law & Economics, vol. 4, no. 3, 2008, pp. 751-778
- Shapira R. Disciplinary Measures against Minors as Justification in Criminal Law. Israel Law Review. 2014;30(1-2):161-170.
