= Church of the Holy Sepulchre, Estella-Lizarra =

Church of the Holy Sepulchre
- Iglesia del Santo Sepulcro (Spanish)
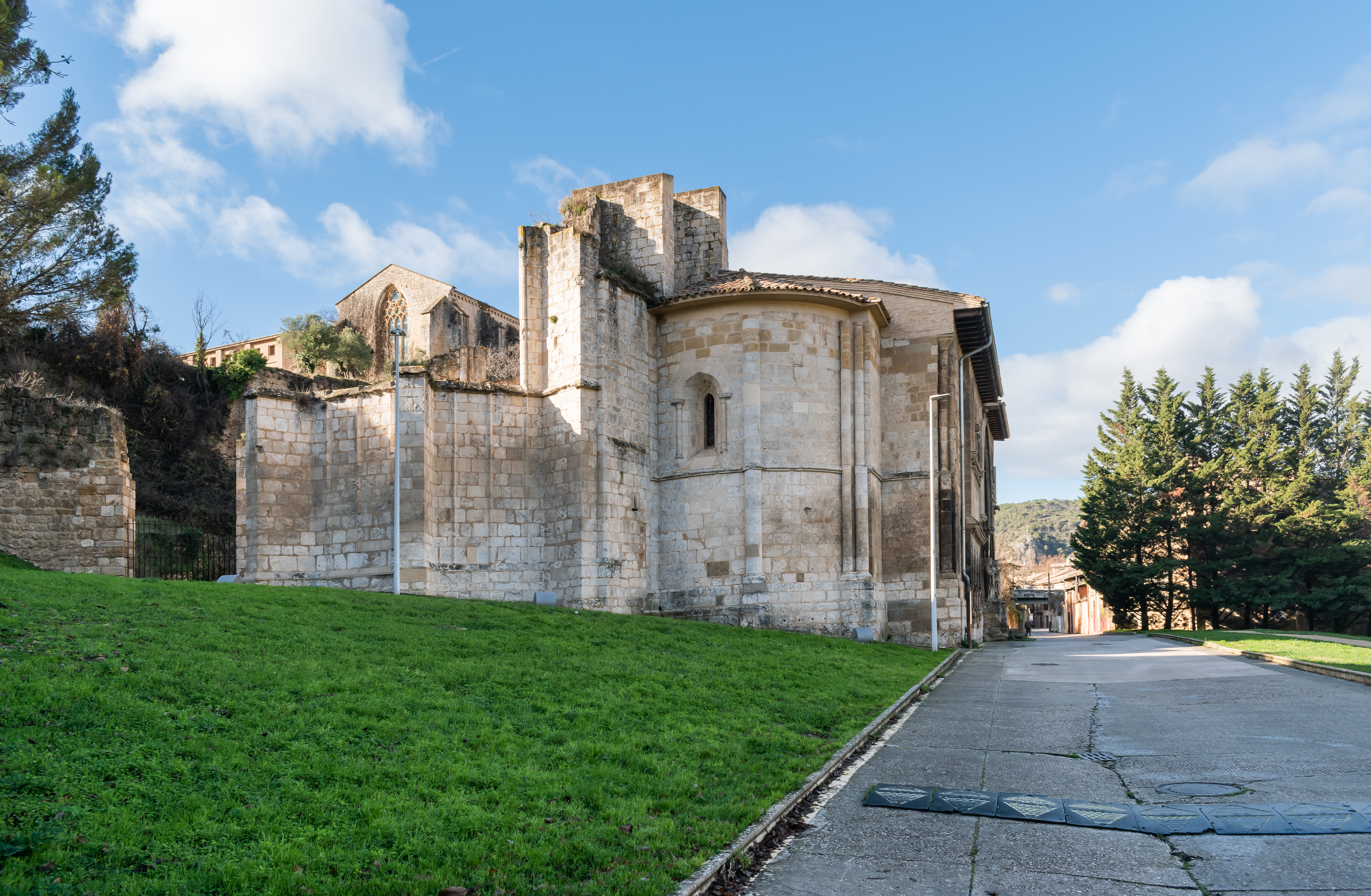

- Location within Spain
- 42°40′11″N 2°01′31″W
- Location: Estella-Lizarra, Spain

Spanish Cultural Heritage
- Criteria: Bien de Interés Cultural
- Designated: 24 June 1931
- Reference no.: RI-51-0000760

The Church of the Holy Sepulchre is a cultural property located on the old Pilgrims’ Street in the borough of San Martín in Estella-Lizarra, Navarre, Spain. The construction took place with periods of inactivity between the 12th and the 16th centuries, but was ultimately left unfinished. As was customary at the time, the building began with the apse, where a Romanesque structure is still preserved. However, the most active period of construction occurred in the 14th century, to which the southern facade belongs. Particularly noteworthy is the Gothic portal, featuring sculptures of exceptional quality, especially in the tympanum, the capitals, and the upper gallery, where a group of apostles is depicted in fully rounded sculptures.

In 1821, works were carried out to adapt it as a parish church, where worship continued until 1881, when it was permanently closed due to the depopulation of the neighborhood. By decree of June 3, 1981, the building was declared a Bien de Interés Cultural.

== History ==
From the 11th century onwards, Estella-Lizarra became a prominent town on the French Way in the Kingdom of Navarre due to its strategic location and the economic, cultural, and religious growth driven by the influx of pilgrims. On the right bank of the Ega River, a new borough or settlement known as San Martín took shape, populated mainly by Franks, a large share of whom came from France. These settlers benefited from the charter granted to them by the "king of the Pamplonan [Navarrese] and Aragonese people" Sancho Ramírez, around 1080, with the aim of encouraging settlement by granting privileges that guaranteed their personal safety and the security of their property.

In this new settlement of Estella-Lizarra, a chapel dedicated to the French saint Martin of Tours was built, which around 1090 was replaced by the parish church of San Pedro de la Rúa. Later, at the beginning of Pilgrims’ Street, the Church of the Holy Sepulchre was constructed, with its first documented reference dating back to 1123. At the other end of the same street, the Church of Saint Nicholas of Bari was erected, at the point where the medieval city wall was crossed and the road toward the Kingdom of Casatile began. This last church disappeared in the 16th century due to a lack of parishioners. Sancho Ramírez donated the three aforementioned churches to the Royal Monastery of San Juan de la Peña, which over the centuries led to conflicts with the Bishopric of Pamplona, as it sought to bring them under its jurisdiction.

== Building ==
The church began to be constructed in the 12th century, in the Romanesque period, following the guidelines of the Cistercian style. It was desugbed with three naves, the central one wider than the lateral ones, each of which was to have its own apse; however, only the one on the Gospel side (located to the north) was begun. In the 14th century, construction resumed with the building of the central apse, Gothic in style, polygonal and reinforced with buttresses, while on the Epistle side, also polygonal in plan, only the foundations were laid.

Work resumed again in the 16th century, although without significant changes, and finally in 1821 the Gospel nave was enclosed to isolate it from the rest of the still unfinished building, so that it could be used for parish worship. In sum, the original Romanesque plan to build a three-nave church was never realized, among other reasons because it was conceived with excessive ambition and optimism, which were ultimately curtailed by a lack of resources. As Javier Martínez de Aguirre notes: "as in other churches in Estella, and particularly in this one, the poorest in the town according to documentary evidence, the initial project far exceeded the parish’s financial means, which is why it was never completed".

The first documented reference to this church dates back to 1123, when it is mentioned as the seat of the confraternity of the Holy Sepulchre; later, those of Saint Julian of Le Mans, the Virgin of Bethlehem, and the Virgin of the Pillar were also established there.

It was declared a national monument on June 24, 1931. In the 1960s, consolidation works were carried out that altered the interior by adding an intermediate floor. In 2025, the Gothic facade underwent restoration.

=== Exterior ===
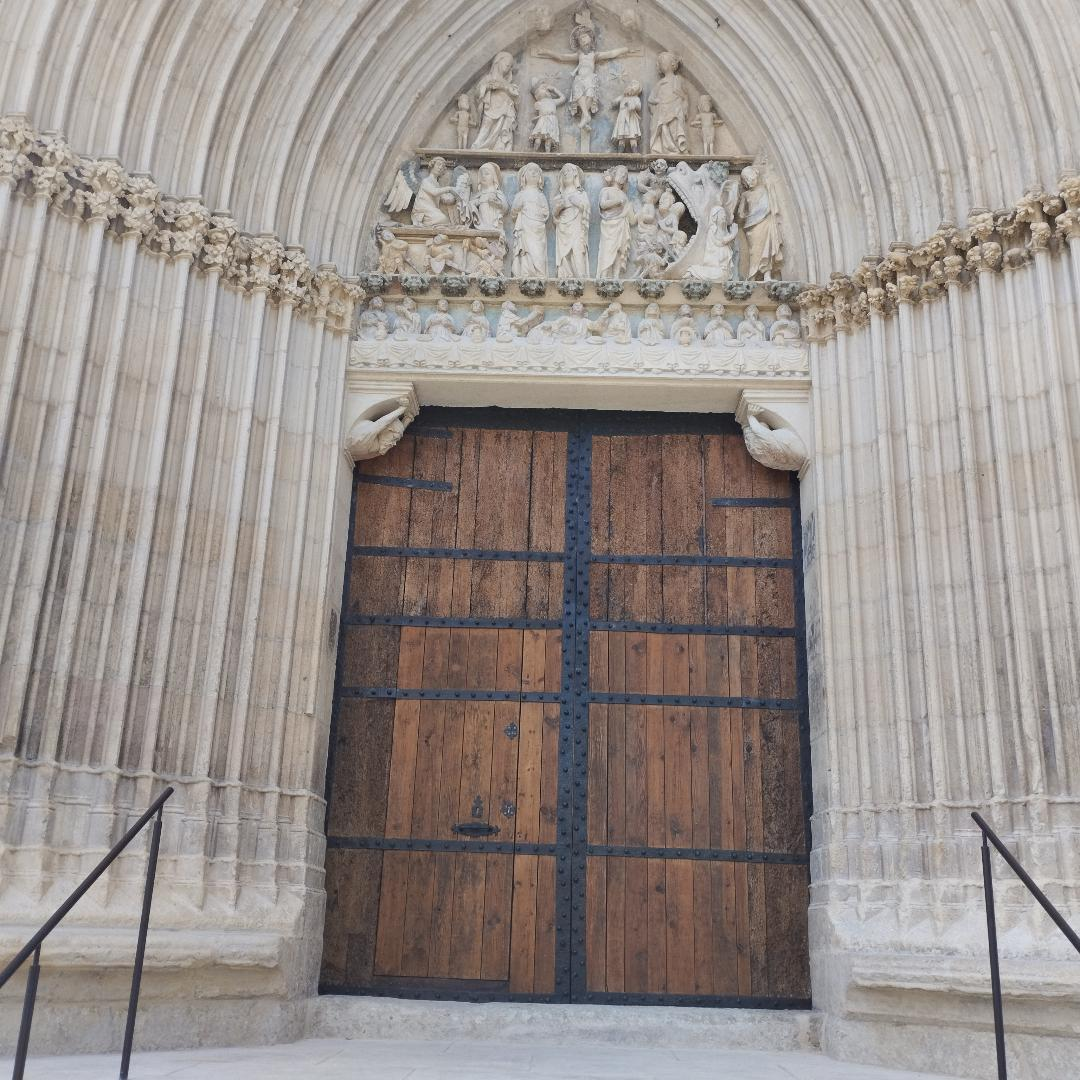
Portal (14th century)

The exterior is dominated by the large Gothic portal from the early 14th century, set in the north wall. It features twelve splayed archivolts resting on a continuous capital decorated with plant and animal motifs rendered with refined carving, similar to the portal of Santa María la Real in Olite. The capital in turn rests on roll mouldings that extend the line of the archivolts. From the keystones of the arches emerge the busts of six angels: one blowing a trumpet and the others bearing the instruments of the Passion, evoking the church's dedication to the burial of Jesus. The tympanum is divided into three levels: the lower one depicts the Last Supper, carved from a single block, while the central level shows the three Marys at the tomb of Jesus, the Harrowing of Hell, and the Gospel scene known as Noli me tangere. The upper level shows the crucified Jesus, with the Virgin and Saint John on either side, and the Roman soldiers Longinus, to Jesus's right, holding the lance he drove into his heart, and Stephaton, holding the reed with which he gave him vinegar to drink; the two thieves are placed at the ends of the arch, at a smaller scale to fit the remaining space of the tympanum.

The lintel of the doorway, as was common in Romanesque and Gothic architecture, is supported by the busts of two bearded figures acting as corbels. The upper part of the portal is flanked by two groups of six niches, each sheltering an apostle; given the variety of carving styles, these were likely the work of different sculptors. On either side of the staircase leading to the entrance are two weathered statues: to the left, Saint James the Great, dressed as a pilgrim of the Camino de Santiago, and to the right, a bishop wearing a tiara and seemingly holding a crozier. There are several hypotheses regarding his identity: he could represent Saint Julian of Le Mans, Saint Saturnin, or Saint Martin of Tours. (Note: This was probably not its original location.)

To the left of the portal, four Gothic arches (13th century) open in the wall, now filled in, while to the right a wider arch of advanced Gothic style also stands, likewise closed by the wall. On both sides of this arch are two small double capitals. The one on the left depicts the Dormition of Mary which, as Fernández-Ladreda describes, portrays "the final moments of the Virgin's life and her subsequent triumph, including the burial with the legendary detail of the desecrating Jew, Christ carrying his mother to Heaven and the Coronation". In the keystone of this same arch appears Saint John the Baptist dressed in a tunic of camel's hair, as described in the New Testament.

=== Interior ===
The interior reflects the different construction phases of the church, as well as the consolidation works carried out in the 20th century. Among other elements, it preserves remains of Baroque altarpieces, pieces of woodwork, and a funerary slab belonging to a layperson, likely from the nearby convent of Santo Domingo, as well as a Gothic baptismal font (14th century) with a polygonal shape and reliefs of opposing animals at its base.

When the parish of the Holy Sepulchre was closed in 1881, its assets were transferred to the neighboring church of San Pedro de la Rúa. This includes a Romanesque-style crucifix and an image of the Virgin of Bethlehem, depicting Mary seated with the Christ Child in her arms as the Throne of God. It is a frontal sculpture, Romanesque in its hieratic quality, although it dates from the late 13th century, already in the Gothic period, as suggested by the angular folds of the mantle.

== Gallery ==
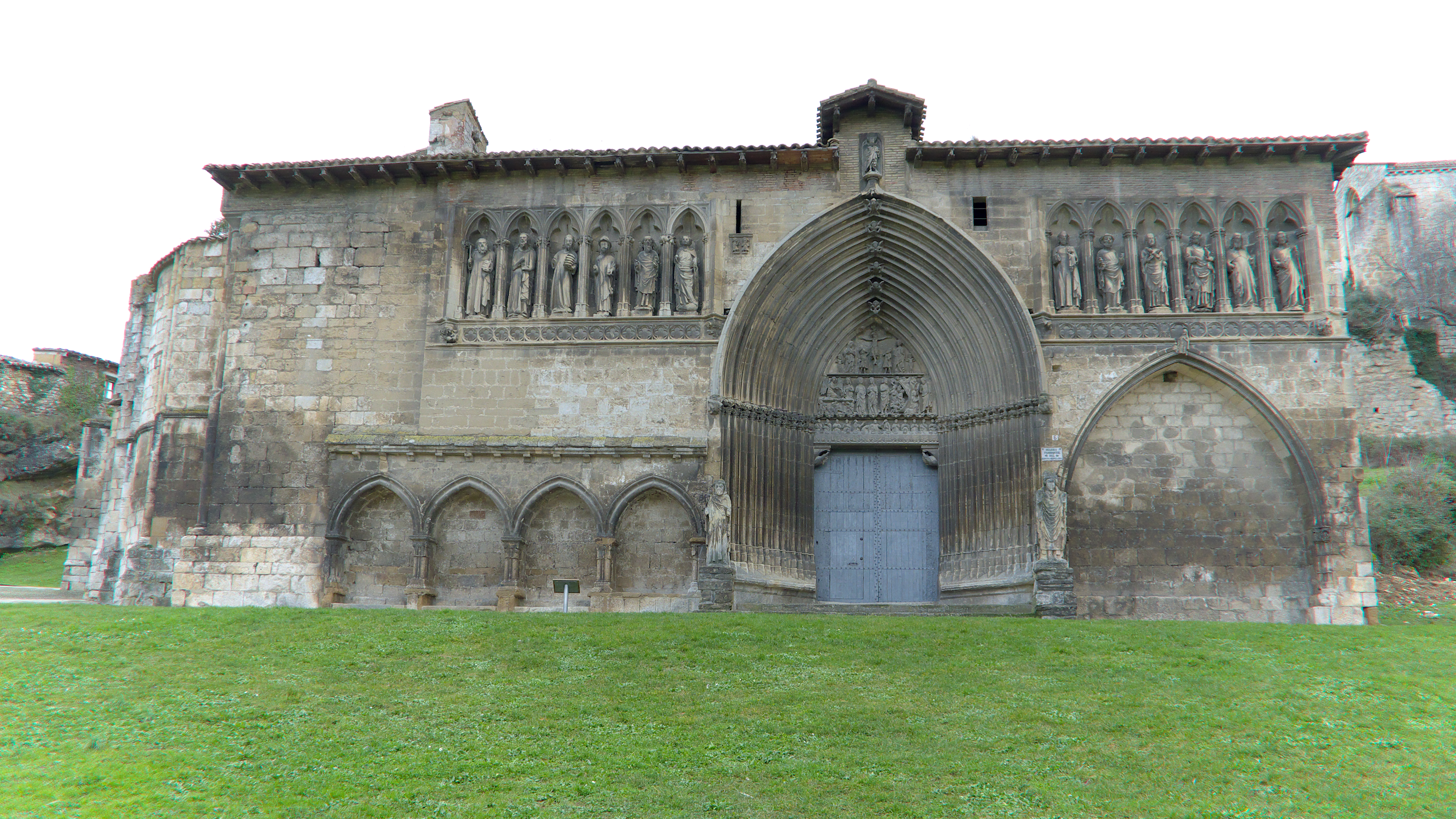
General view

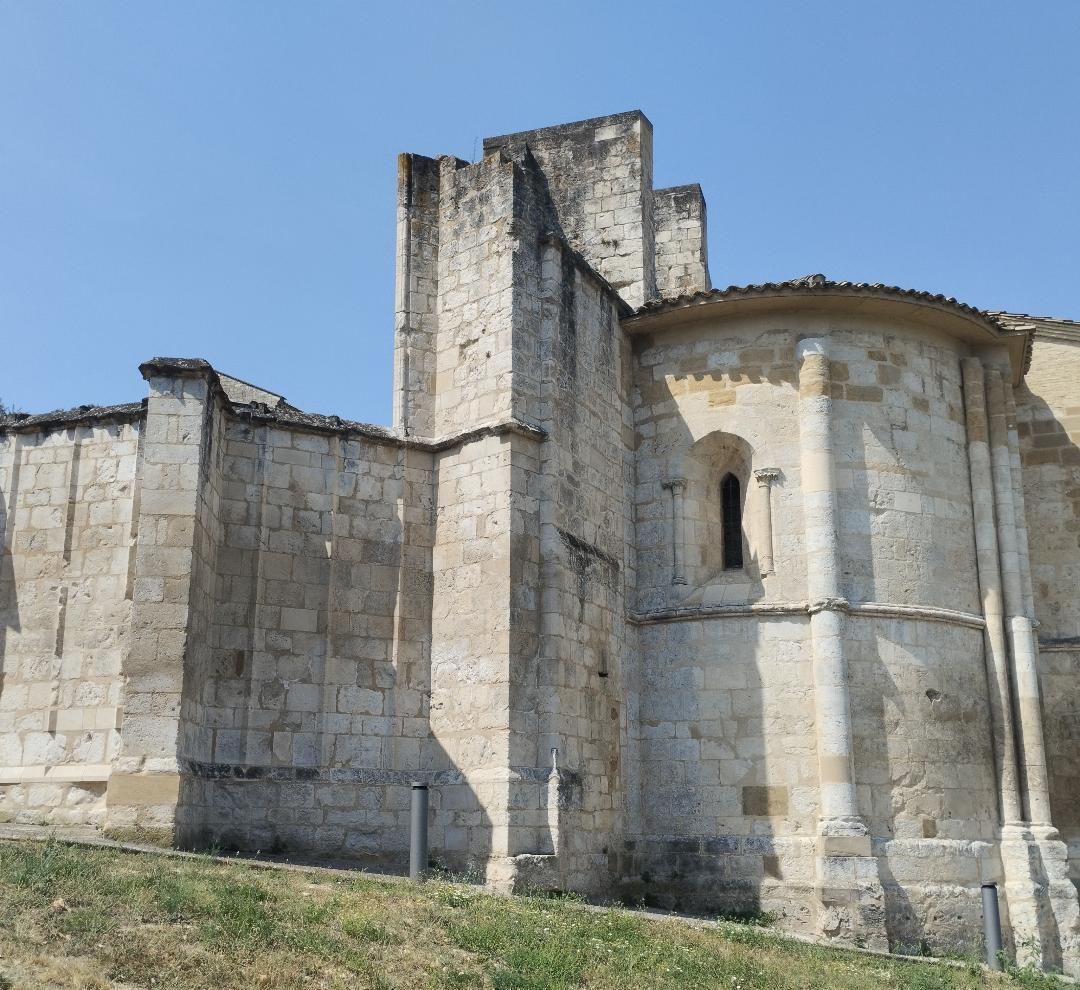
Romanesque apse

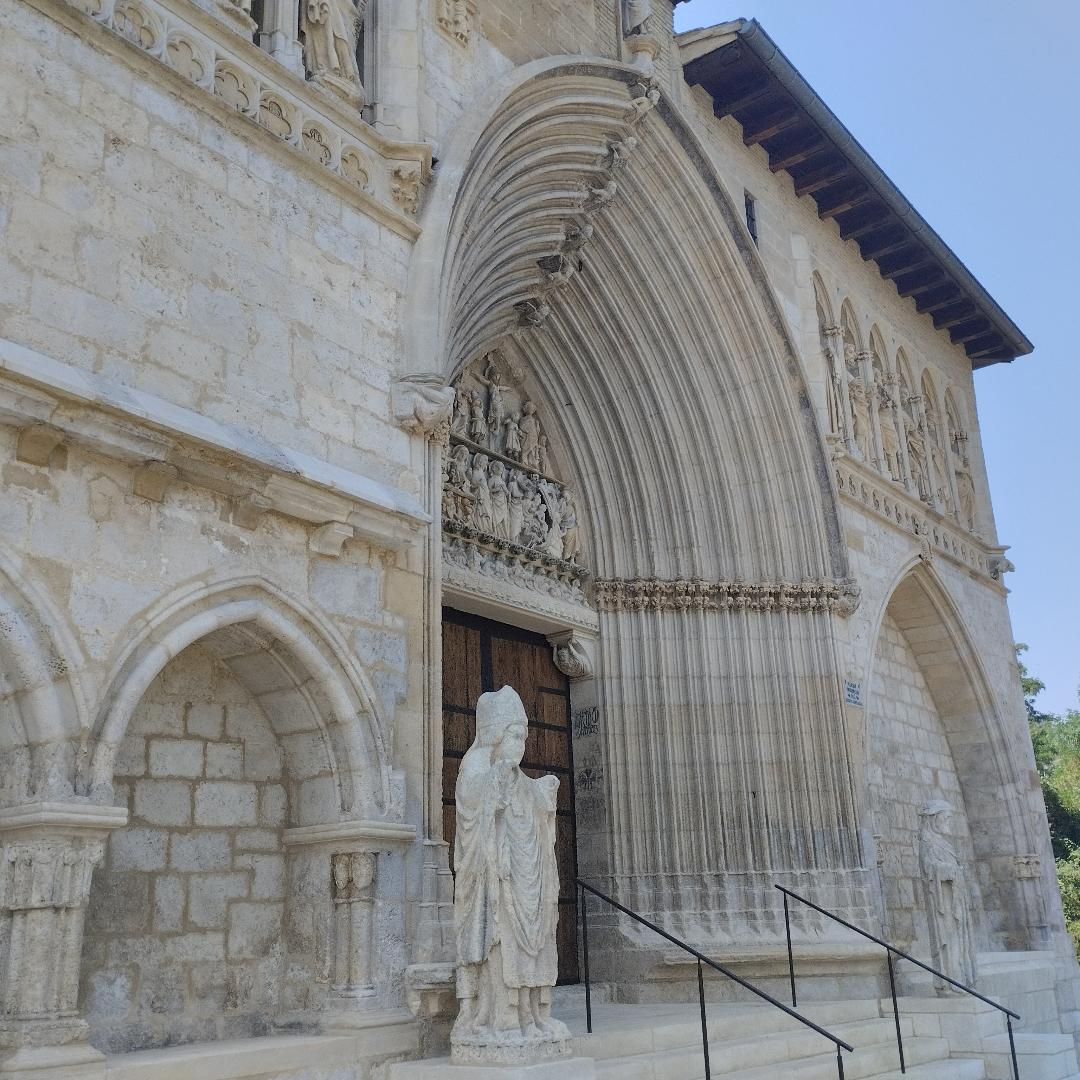
North facade

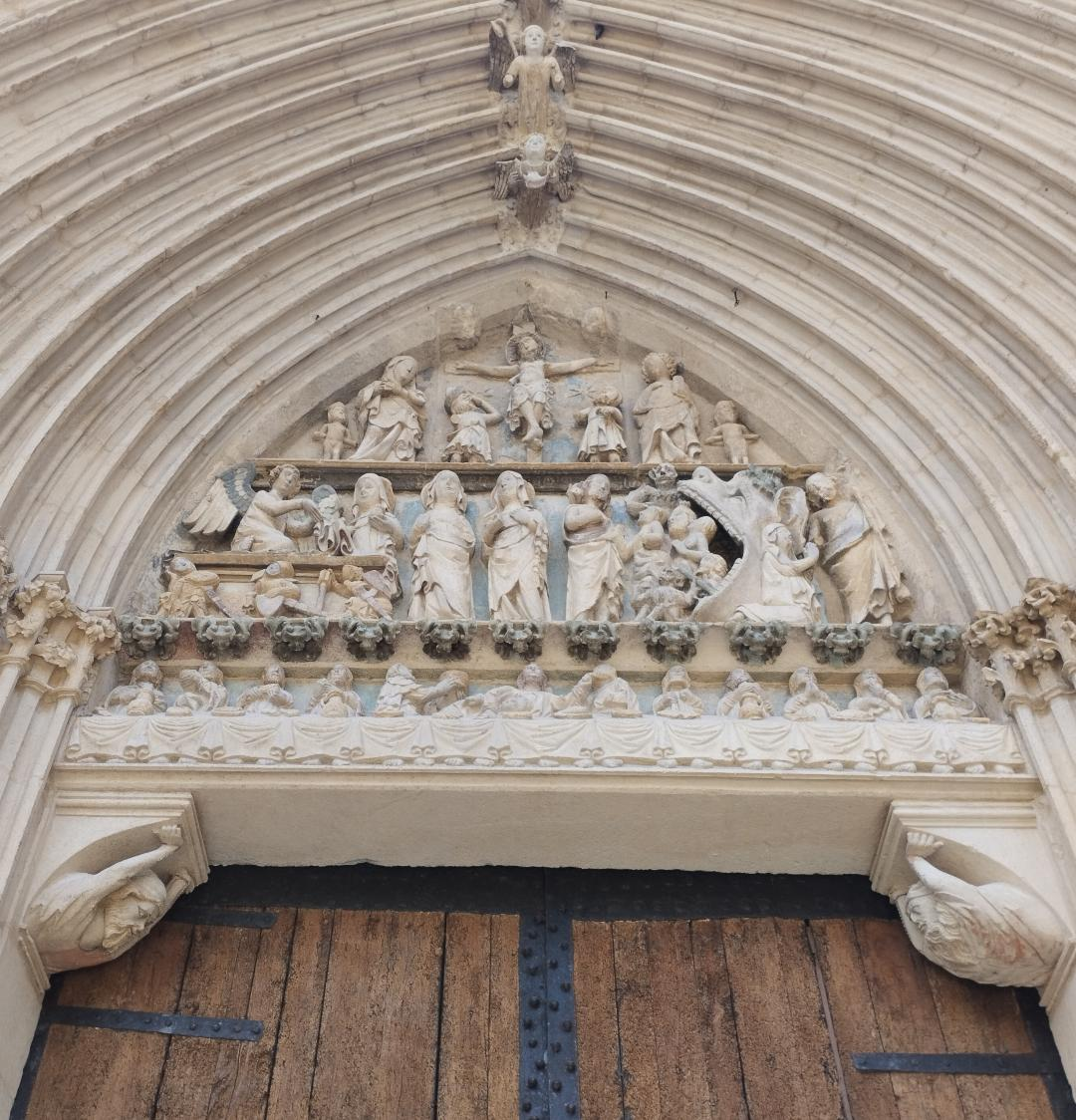
Tympanum and corbels

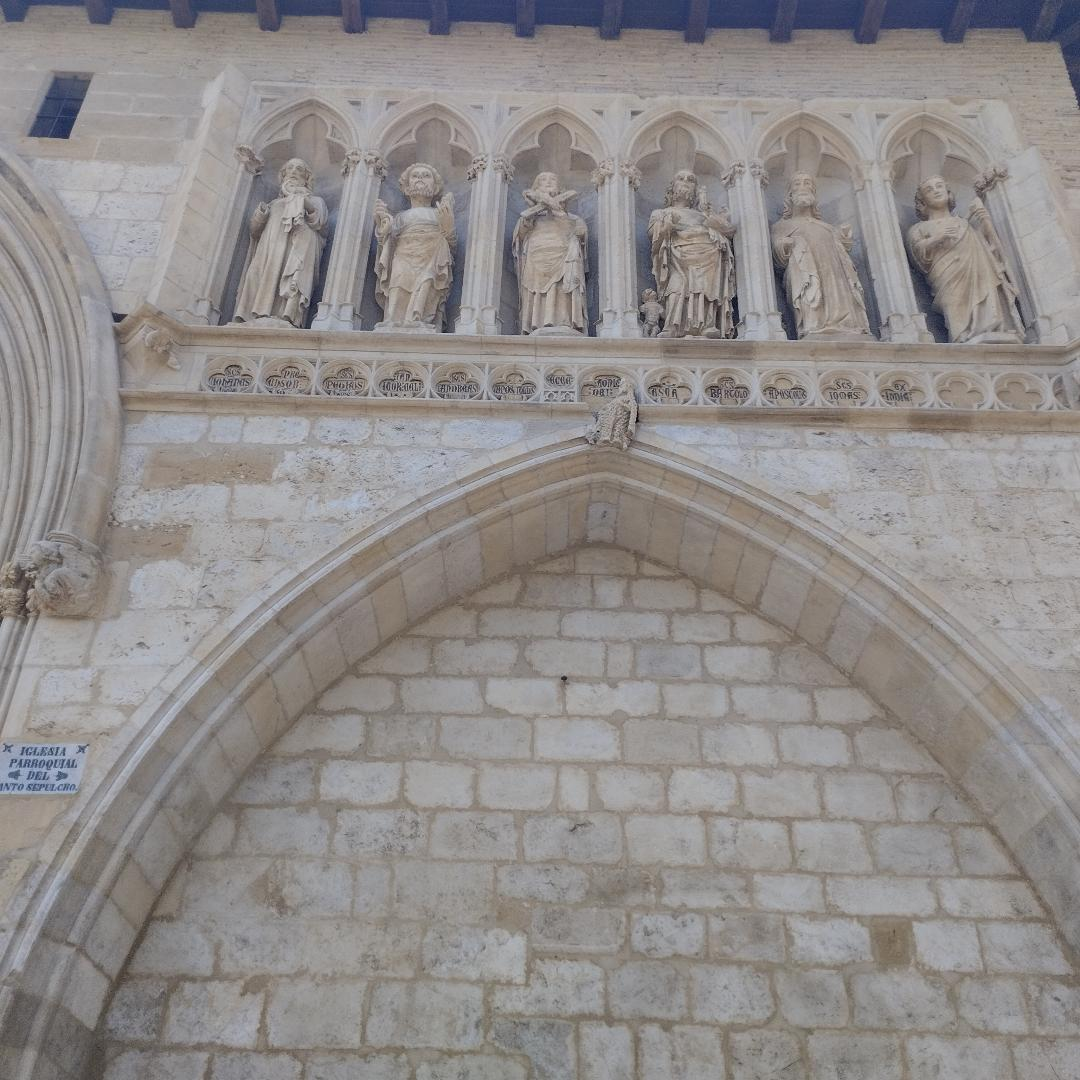
Gallery with apostles

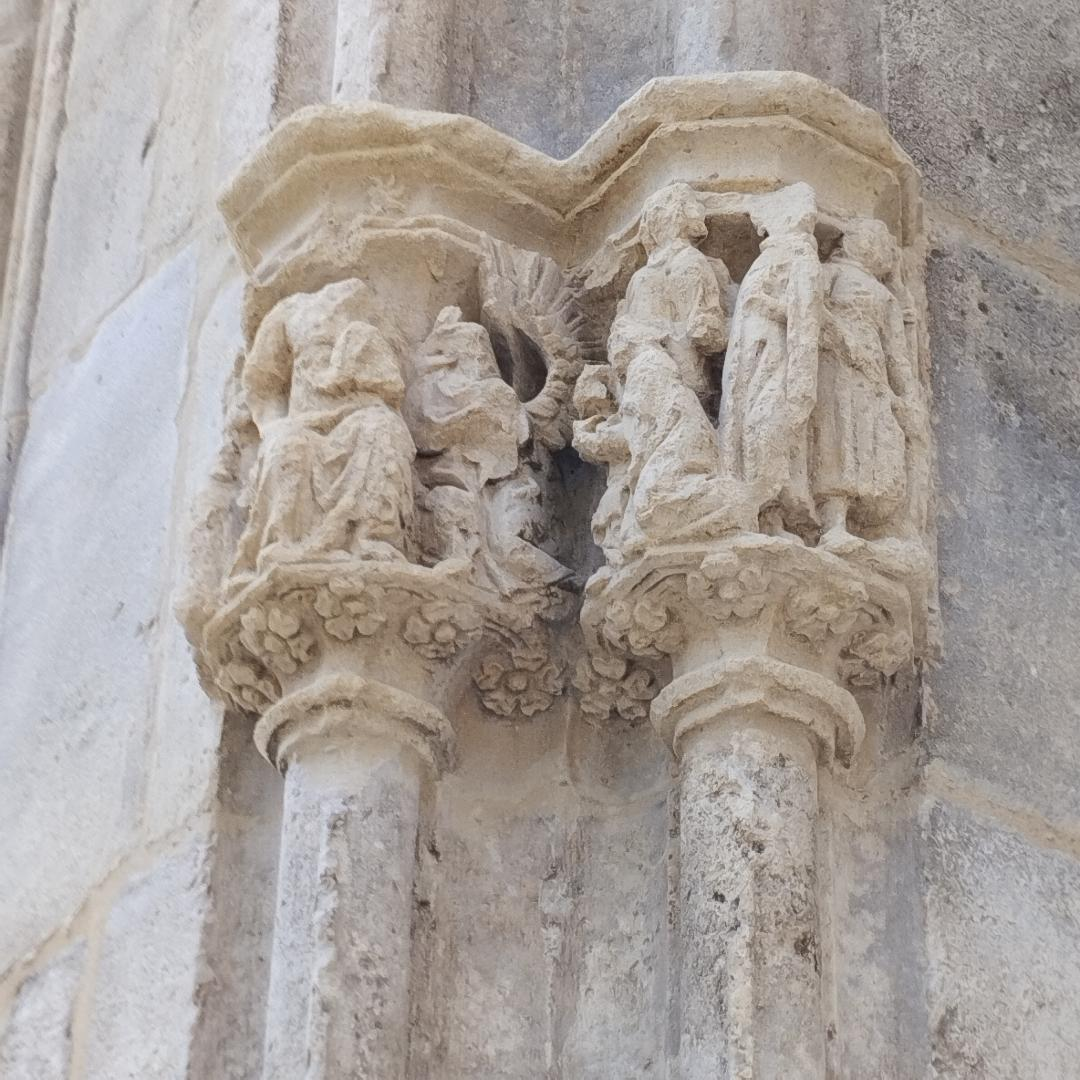
Portal, capitals of the right-hand arch.

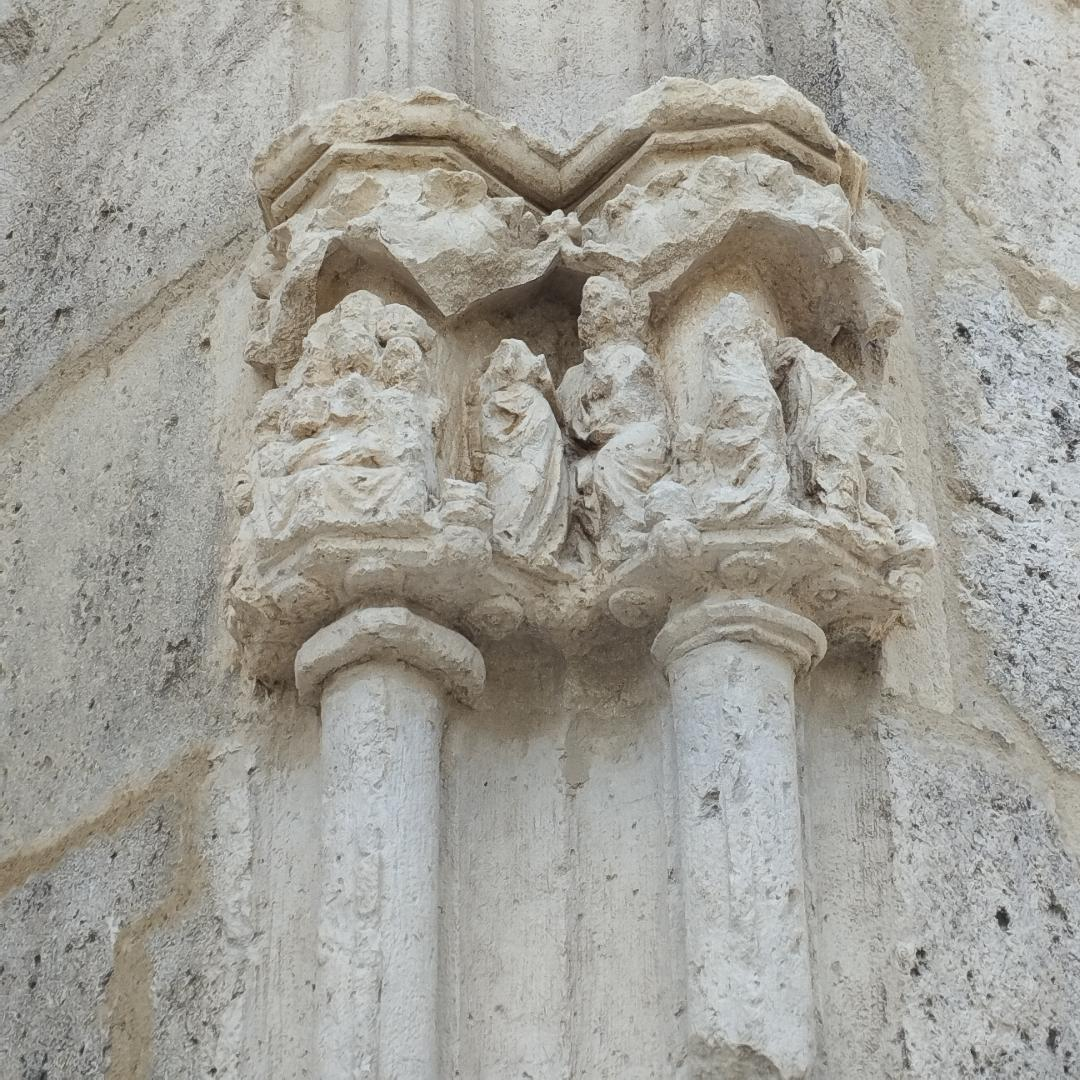
Portal, capitals of the right-hand arch.

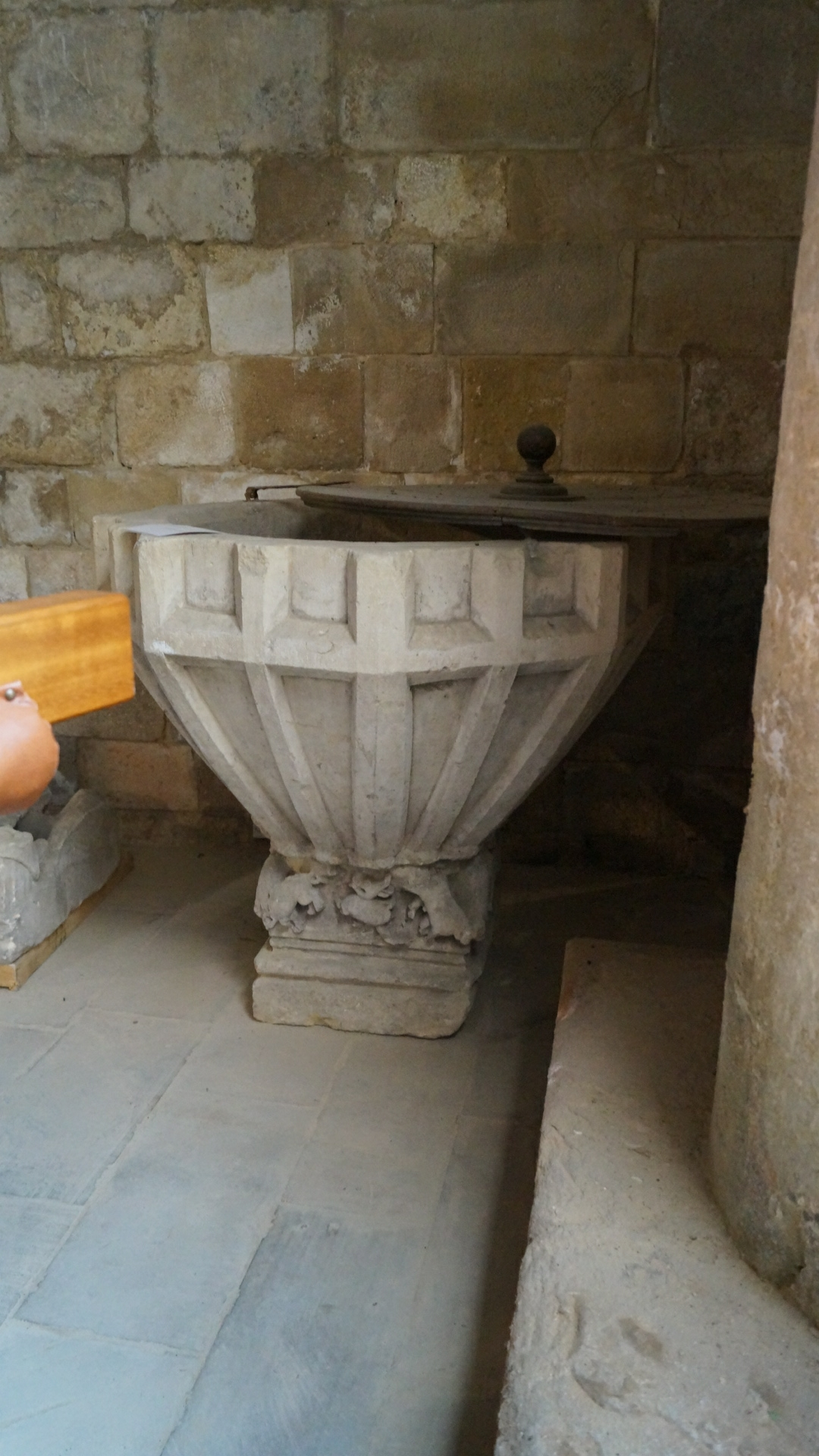
Baptismal font

== See also ==
- List of Bienes de Interés Cultural in Navarre

== Bibliography ==
- Aragonés Estella, Esperanza (2018). "Santo Sepulcro de Estella, bajo el signo de san Juan". Terra Stellae (in Spanish) (9). Estella: 52–73. ISSN 2171-1895.
- García Gainza, María Concepción; Heredia Moreno, María del Carmen; Rivas Carmona, Jesús; Orbe Sivatte, Mercedes (1982). "Parroquia del Santo Sepulcro". Catálogo monumental de Navarra (in Spanish). Vol. II Merindad de Estella: Abaigar-Eulate. Institución Príncipe de Viana Arzobispado de Pamplona Universidad de Navarra. pp. 513–518. ISBN 978-84-235-0575-3.
- Fernández-Ladreda Aguadé, Clara (2015). El arte gótico en Navarra (in Spanish). Pamplona: Government of Navarre. ISBN 978-84-235-3400-5.
- Gutiérrez Eraso, Pedro María (1970). Estella monumental. Navarra. Temas de Cultura Popular (in Spanish). Vol. 68 (2 ed.). Pamplona: Diputación Foral de Navarra.
- Itúrbide Díaz, José Javier (2010). Estella. Government of Navarre. ISBN 978-84-235-3221-6.
- Lacarra Ducay, María del Carmen (1986). Navarra. Guía y Mapa (in Spanish). Pamplona: Caja de Ahorros de Navarra. ISBN 8450534577.
- Martínez Álava, Carlos J. (2004). "El último tercio del siglo XII y las primeras décadas del XIII. Arquitectura". El arte románico en Navarra (in Spanish) (2. ed., corr. y aum ed.). Government of Navarre, Department of Culture and Tourism, Prince of Viana Institution. pp. 165–317. ISBN 978-84-235-2259-0. OCLC 59671154.
- Sanz Mosquera, José Antonio (1993–1994). "Resumen de las actuaciones en la iglesia del Santo Sepulcro de Estella Sanz" (PDF). 'Trabajos de Arqueología Navarra (in Spanish). 11: 316–318.
- Uranga Galdiano, José Esteban; Íñiguez Almech, Francisco (1973). Arte medieval navarro (PDF) (in Spanish). Vol. 2-Arte románico. Aranzadi. ISBN 978-84-5005-585-6. OCLC 627609448. Archived from the original on 17 January 2017.
- Valencia Ciordia, José Andrés (2018). "La Iglesia del Santo Sepulcro- La Parroquia. Su gente". Terra Stellae (in Spanish). Estella: 30–45. ISSN 2171-1895.
