= Church of Santa María la Real, Sangüesa =

Church of Santa María la Real
- Iglesia de Santa María la Real (Spanish)
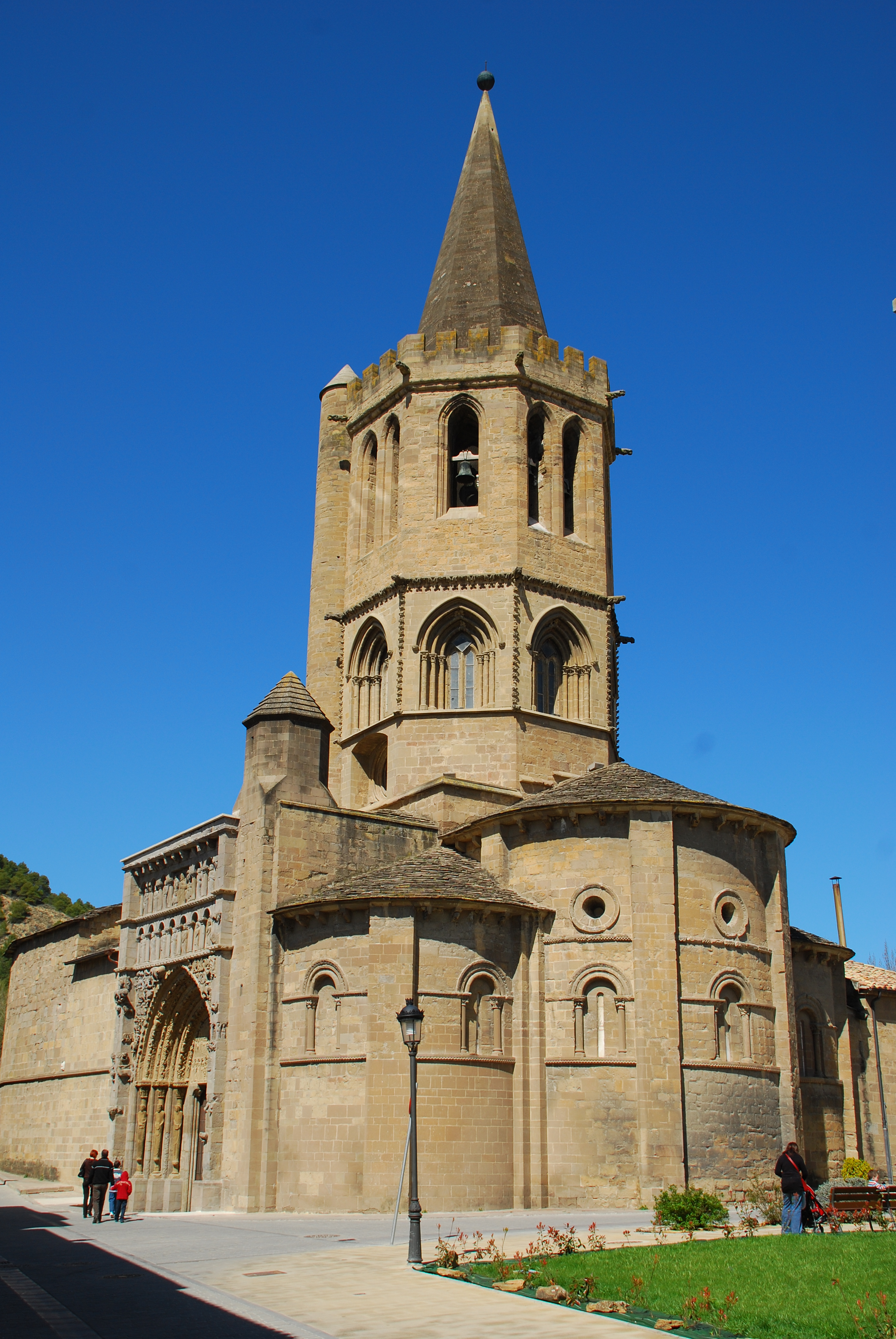

- Location within Spain
- 42.577037°N 1.285301°W
- Location: Sangüesa, Spain

Spanish Cultural Heritage
- Official name: Iglesia de Santa María la Real
- Type: Non-movable
- Criteria: Monument
- Designated: 1889
- Reference no.: RI-51-0000056

The Church of Santa María la Real (Spanish: Iglesia de Santa María la Real) is a medieval church located in Sangüesa, Spain. The architecture represents a transitional style between Romanesque and Gothic.

== Conservation ==
Since 1889, it has been protected by a heritage listing.

== See also ==
- List of Bien de Interés Cultural in Navarre
