= List of law schools in Egypt =

This is a list of schools in Egypt dedicated to the study of Law.

Alexandria Governorate

- Alexandria University: Faculty of Law located in Alexandria
- Pharos University in Alexandria: Faculty of Legal Studies and International Relations located in Alexandria

Asyut Governorate

- Al-Azhar University: Faculty of Sharia and Law - Asyut Branch (in Arabic) located in Asyut
- Assiut University located in Asyut

Beni Suef Governorate

- Beni-Suef University: Faculty of Law located in Beni Suef

Cairo Governorate

- Ain Shams University: Faculty of Law (in Arabic) located in Cairo
- The British University in Egypt: Faculty of Law with dual certificates (British and Egyptian ) at El Sherouk City, Cairo
- The American University in Cairo: School of Global Affairs and Public Policy located in Cairo

Dakahlia Governorate

- Mansoura University: Faculty of Law located in Mansoura

Gharbia Governorate

- Al-Azhar University: Faculty of Sharia and Law - Tanta Branch (in Arabic) located in Tanta
- Tanta University: Faculty of Law (in Arabic) located in Tanta

Giza Governorate

- Cairo University: Faculty of Law (in Arabic) located in Giza

Helwan Governorate

- Helwan University: Faculty of Law located in Helwan

Monufia Governorate

- Minufiya University located in Shibin El Kom

Qalyubia Governorate

- Banha University: Faculty of Law (in Arabic) located in Banha

Qena Governorate

- South Valley University: Faculty of Law located in Qena

Sharqia Governorate

- Zagazig University: Faculty of Law located in Zagazig

== See also ==
- Education in Egypt
- List of universities in Egypt
- Lists of law schools
