= Alejandro Guzmán Brito =

Chilean lawyer and historian (1945–2021)

Alejandro Ángel Guzmán Brito (21 March 1945 – 13 August 2021) was a Chilean lawyer and historian.

== Biography ==
He was an emeritus Roman Law professor at the Law Faculty of the Pontifical Catholic University of Valparaíso and served as rector of the Metropolitan University of Educational Sciences from 1989 to 1990. Brito died of COVID-19 on 13 August 2021, at age 76 in Valparaíso.

In 2017, he presented the book Las Instituciones de Gayo, which was written by Francisco Samper Polo.

== Works ==
- Guzmán Brito, Alejandro (1974). Caución tutelar en derecho romano. Pamplona: Universidad de Navarra. 329 pages
- Guzmán Brito, Alejandro (1976). Dos estudios en torno a la historia de la tutela romana. Pamplona: Universidad de Navarra. 300 pages
- Guzmán Brito, Alejandro (1996). Derecho privado romano; Tomo I. Santiago de Chile: Editorial Jurídica de Chile. 802 pages
- Guzmán Brito, Alejandro (1996). Derecho privado romano; Tomo II. Santiago de Chile: Editorial Jurídica de Chile. 790 pages
