= List of Bienes de Interés Cultural in Navarre =

This is a list of Bien de Interés Cultural landmarks in Navarre, Spain.

- Cámara de los Comptos
- Ex-monastery of Santa María de la Oliva
- Collegiate church of Santa María (Tudela)
- Church of Santa María la Real, Sangüesa
- Church of the Holy Sepulchre, Estella-Lizarra
- San Esteban de Deyo
