= Cámara de Comptos de Navarra =

Cámara de los Comptos
- Cámara de los Comptos (Spanish)
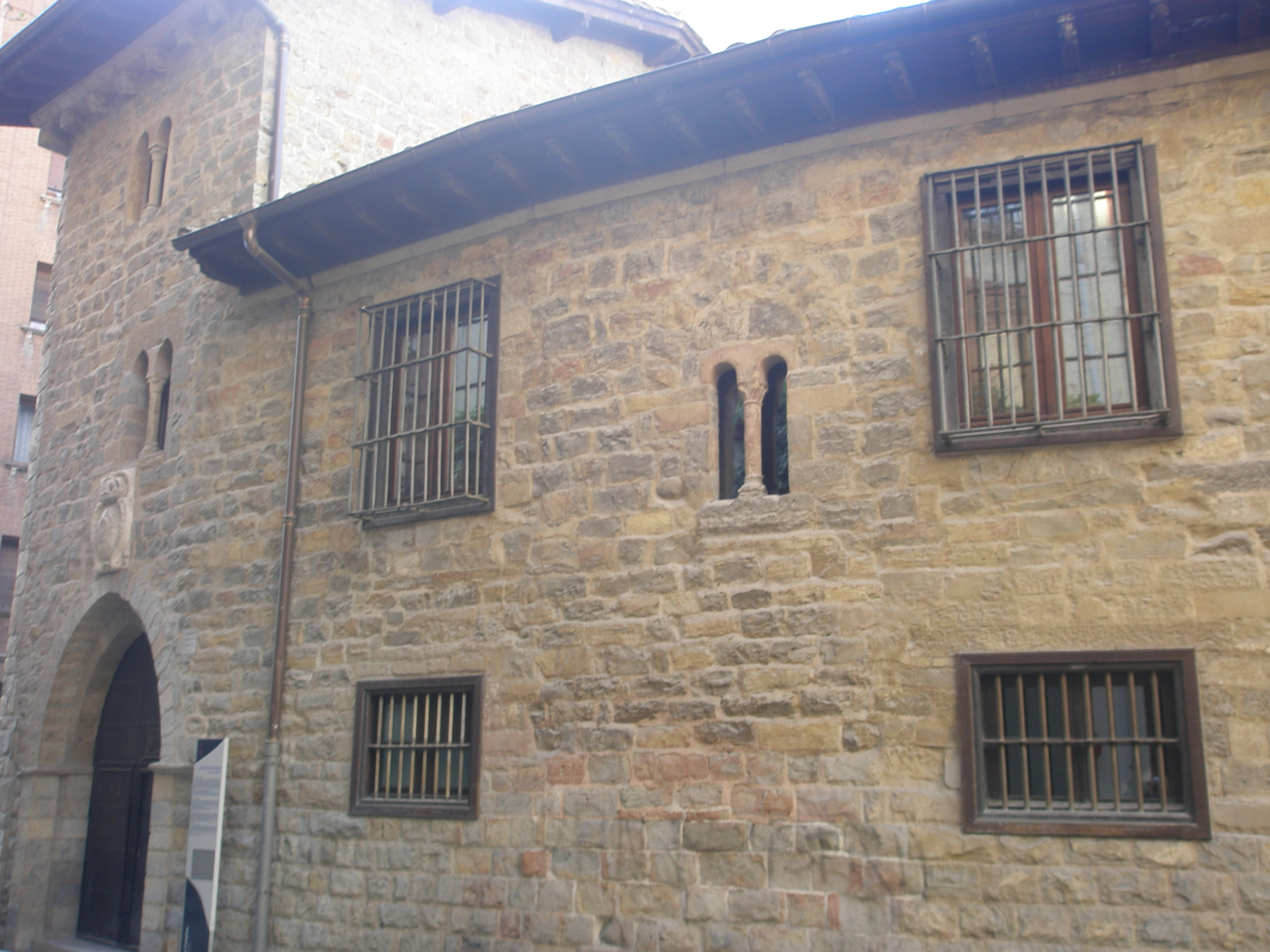

- Location within Spain
- 42.817471°N 1.645731°W
- Location: Pamplona, Spain

Spanish Cultural Heritage
- Official name: Cámara de los Comptos
- Type: Non-movable
- Criteria: Monument
- Designated: 1868
- Reference no.: RI-51-0000008

The Cámara de los Comptos (Spanish: Cámara de los Comptos) is a building located in Pamplona, Spain. It was declared Bien de Interés Cultural in 1868.

== See also ==
- List of Bien de Interés Cultural in Navarre
