= List of law schools in Slovakia =

This is a list of law schools in Slovakia.

- Bratislava School of Law
- Comenius University in Bratislava Faculty of Law (sk:Právnická fakulta Univerzity Komenského v Bratislave)
- Matej Bel University
- University of Pavol Jozef Šafárik
- University of Trnava
