= List of law schools in Ukraine =

There are more than 300 law schools in Ukraine. These include:

- Kharkiv Law Academy
- Odesa Law Academy
- University of Kyiv, law faculty
- Lviv Ivan Franko National University School of Law
- Kyiv University of Law
- National University of Ostroh academy, Institute of Law
- Khmelnytskyi University of Management and Law
- Kyiv National University of Trade and Economics, faculty of international trade and law
