= List of law schools in Mexico =

== United States of Mexico ==
This is a list of law schools and law faculties in Mexico.

- Escuela Libre de Derecho, School of Law
- Instituto Tecnológico Autónomo de México (ITAM), Faculty of Law
- Instituto Tecnológico y de Estudios Superiores de Monterrey (ITESM), Faculty of Law
- Universidad Autónoma del Estado de México,
- Universidad Autónoma de Nuevo León, Facultad de Derecho y Criminología
- Universidad Anahuac, Faculty of Law
- Universidad Nacional Autónoma de México (UNAM), Faculty of Law
- Universidad de Guanajuato, Faculty of Law
- Universidad La Salle, Faculty of Law
- Universidad Iberoamericana, Faculty of Law
- Universidad Panamericana, Faculty of Law
- Barra Nacional de Abogados (BNA) School of Law,
- Centro Universitario Incarnate Word,

Facultad Libre de Derecho de Monterrey, School of Law
