= University of Navarra School of Law =

Law school of the University of Navarra

University of Navarra School of Law Spanish: Facultad de Derecho de la Universidad de Navarra Basque: Nafarroako Unibertsitatea Zuzenbide Eskola
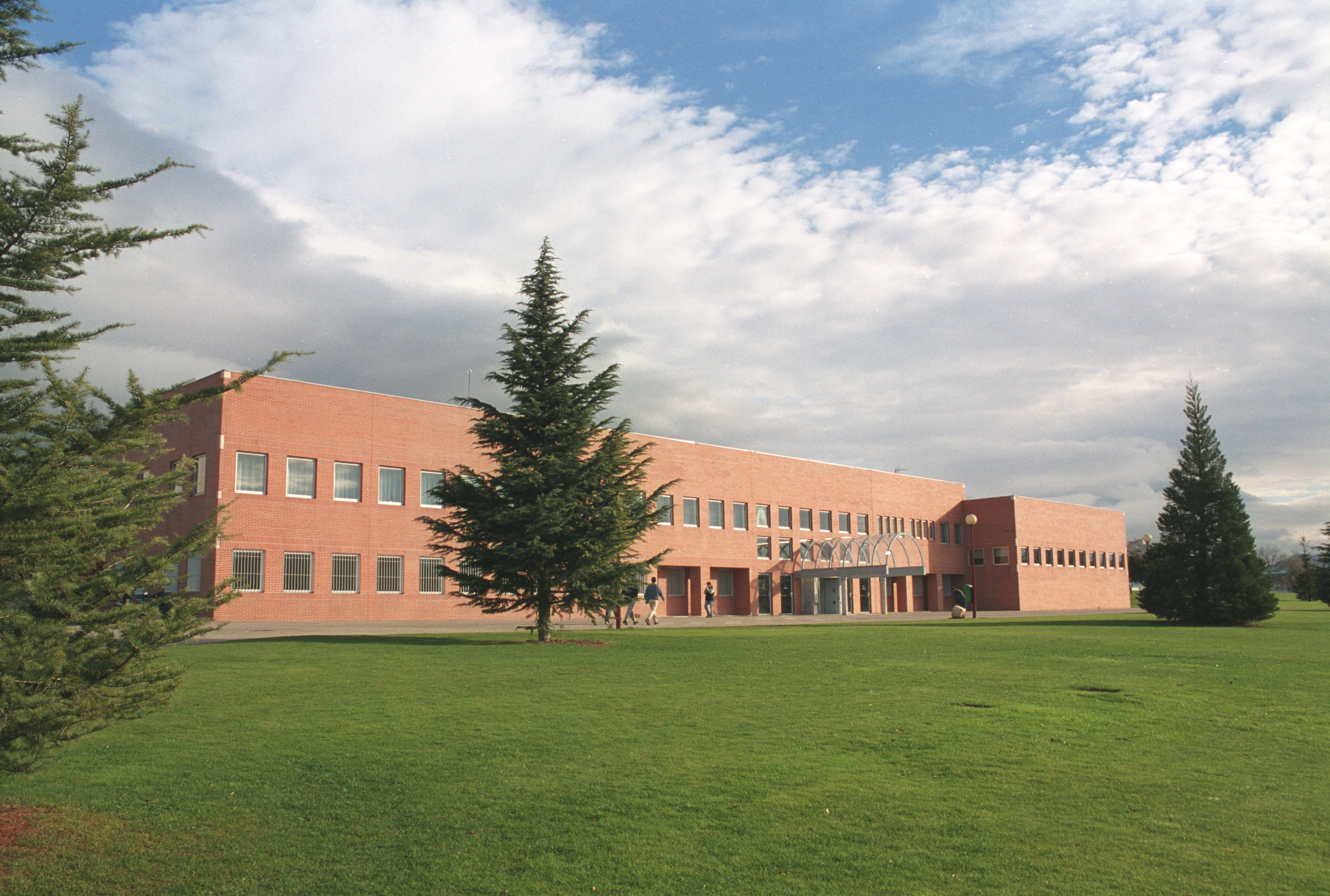
- Exterior view of the School of Law Building of the University of Navarra.
- Parent school: University of Navarra
- Religious affiliation: Roman Catholic (Opus Dei)
- Established: 17 October 1952; 72 years ago
- School type: Private
- Dean: Jorge Noval
- Location: Pamplona, Navarre, Spain; 42.80082°N 1.65536°W
- Website: Official Website (in Spanish)

The University of Navarra School of Law (Spanish: Facultad de Derecho de la Universidad de Navarra, abbreviated as Derecho UNAV or UNAV Law) is the oldest school of the University of Navarra system. The School of Law is located on the university's main campus in Pamplona, Spain. Approximately 70% of its law students come from the other regions of Spain and from a long list of countries such as the United States, Colombia, the United Kingdom, Honduras, Mexico, France, Albania, Jamaica, and Portugal, amongst others.

The School of Law offers an ample range of Degrees at both the undergraduate and graduate level. The Degree in Spanish Law, "Licenciatura de Derecho", is complemented by six specialization diplomas: "Derecho Económico"; "Derecho Medioambiental"; "Derecho Foral Navarro"; the Anglo-American Common Law system; as well as, Global Law (Anglo-American Law Program, International Business Law Program, Global Lawyer Certificate).

== History ==
The School of Law was created in 1952. Lectures were initially held in the Cámara de Comptos de Navarra (a historic building where the Old Kingdom of Navarre's Treasury Chamber was located), and later, in the building of the Museum of Navarre. When the university's Campus was first constructed in 1963, the School of Law operated from the university's Central Building. The current School of Law Building was inaugurated in 1992. A new construction project is currently underway to build a large academic center to house the combined disciplines of Law and Economics. In 2011, the law school announced the planned construction of a smaller campus in Madrid. In 2020, UNAV Law started offering a master's degree in digital law at the university's Madrid campu, as part of an agreement with Spanish law firm Uría Menéndez.

The school, in conjunction with the Parliament of Navarre, organizes the Jornadas del Aula de Derecho Parlamentario, an annual conference on parliamentary law. Additionally, UNAV Law hosts the Latin America Summit, a series of conferences, which have included former-Spanish Foreign Minister, Trinidad Jiménez, amongst its speakers.

Upon admission of Fidel Alonso-Allende, UNAV Development Director, to uphold the institution's rankings "the first important point is to have a solid national and international commercial network that is dedicated to identifying talent all over the world," for which the admissions office visits schools, presenting them with the possible career opportunities after earning their law degrees.

== Studies ==
=== Law Degree ===
- Standard Degree: 240 crs. ECTS.
- Standard Degree with a specialization diploma (240 + 24 crs. ECTS).
  - Derecho Económico.
  - Derecho Ambiental y Urbanístico.
  - Derecho de Navarra.
  - Anglo-American Law Program (in collaboration with the Gertrude Ryan Foundation).
  - International Business Law Program.
  - Global Lawyer Certificate.
- Double Degrees.
  - Law+Economics: 491 crs.
  - Law+Business Administration: 482 crs.

=== Postgraduate ===
- Masters Degrees.
  - Corporate Law: 60 crs. ECTS.
  - Tax Law: 60 crs. ECTS.
  - Double master's degree.
  - Master Iberoamericano de Estudios Juridicos.
- Doctorate Program: approx. 3–5 years.

== School community ==
=== Statistics ===
- 152 lecturers, one of the best ratios lecturer/student in Spain (5,16 approx.)
- More than 460 undergraduate LLB students and 325 undergraduate students are currently enrolled in our Double-Degree in Law and Economics
- 50 Postgraduate students
- 11% of the university's undergraduate students and 30% of postgraduate students come from outside of Spain.

=== Rankings ===
- The school has consistently been ranked one of the top five legal institutions in Spain by QS University rankings, Times Higher Education, and the ranking El mundo.
- The University of Navarra has been ranked as the first Spanish private university by the QS Top Universities and by El mundo.
- The law school degrees have also been very highly ranked at a national level.

=== Notable faculty ===
- Leonardo Polo (1954–56) natural law professor.

=== Notable alumni ===
- Francisco Cobo (Class of '79)-presided over the first gender-based violence jury trial in Navarra.
- Arancha González Laya (Spanish Minister of Foreign Affairs)
- Emilio Cuatrecasas (Senior Partner)
- Pedro Morenés (Spanish Ambassador to the United States)
- Jesús Cardenal (Class of '77, cum laude) former-Spanish Attorney General)
