= List of law schools in Malaysia =

This is a list of law schools in Malaysia. It includes public universities, private universities, private university colleges, branch campuses of foreign universities, and colleges proper.

== List ==
Type	School	Location
Public Universities	University of Malaya	Kuala Lumpur
Public Universities	International Islamic University Malaysia	Gombak, Selangor
Public Universities	National University of Malaysia	Bangi, Selangor
Public Universities	MARA University of Technology	Shah Alam, Selangor
Public Universities	Universiti Utara Malaysia	Sintok, Kedah
Public Universities	Universiti Sains Islam Malaysia	Nilai, Negeri Sembilan
Public Universities	Universiti Sultan Zainal Abidin	Kuala Terengganu, Terengganu
Private Universities	Taylor's University	Subang Jaya, Selangor
Private Universities	Multimedia University	Bukit Beruang, Melaka
Private Universities	HELP University	Bukit Damansara, Kuala Lumpur
Private Universities	INTI International University	Nilai, Negeri Sembilan
Private Universities	Management and Science University	Shah Alam, Selangor
Private Universities	Selangor Islamic University	Bandar Seri Putra, Selangor
Private Universities	University of Melaka	Kuala Sungai Baru, Melaka
Foreign University Branch Campus	University of Reading Malaysia	Educity Iskandar Johor
Colleges	Brickfields Asia College	Brickfields and Petaling Jaya, Selangor
Colleges	Advance Tertiary College	Kuala Lumpur
Colleges	Seri Stamford College	Kepong, Kuala Lumpur
Colleges	UOW Malaysia KDU College	Damansara Jaya, Petaling Jaya
Colleges	SEGi College	Kuching, Sarawak
Colleges	International Islamic College	Kuala Lumpur
