= College of Law and Business =

Private college in Ramat Gan, Israel

Coordinates: 32°5′34.3″N 34°49′19.1″E

- Motto: "Think Global"
- Type: Private
- Established: 1995
- President: Prof. Yoram Blachar
- Students: 4,000
- Location: Ramat Gan, Tel Aviv District, Israel
- Website: clb.ac.il

The College of Law and Business, CLB, (Hebrew: המרכז האקדמי למשפט ועסקים) is a private, non-budgeted academic college in the Tel Aviv District city of Ramat Gan, Israel. It was established in 1995 by members of the law faculty of Hebrew University of Jerusalem. The president is Prof. Yoram Blachar.

CLB was officially recognized as an institution of higher education by the Council for Higher Education since the 2008–2009 academic year.

The institution's Law School has been publishing the legal journal “Alei Mishpat” since November 1999.

CLB offers programs in law, business administration, accounting, computer & data science, health systems, human resource, and psychology.

The current president of the college is Prof. Yoram Blachar. The Dean of the Law School is Avichai Mandelblit; the Dean of the Faculty of Business Administration is Dr. Shmuel (Mula) Cohen; the Dean of the Faculty of Health Systems Management is also Professor Prof. Yoram Blachar; the Dean of the Faculty of Psychology is Professor Ami Shaked; the Dean of the Faculty of Computer Science and Information Systems is Dr. Avi Yossifoff, and the Head of the Accounting Department is Dr. Rimona Peles.

== CLB Academic Faculties ==
The Faculty of Law – Includes three specialization divisions: the Criminal Law and Criminology Division, the Commercial Law Division, and the Human Rights Division.

The Faculty of Business Administration – The curriculum is based on courses that combine theory and research with practical and managerial field experience. It emphasizes case studies from industry, discussions of current issues, and the development of independent and critical thinking.

The Faculty of Computer Science and Data Systems – The computer science degree program provides students with broad knowledge in programming languages, development, algorithms, and mathematics.

The Faculty of Psychology – Offers undergraduate studies that provide a knowledge foundation covering the various branches of psychology, as well as master's degrees in specific fields such as Educational Psychology and Developmental Psychology.

The Faculty of Health Systems Management – Covers various areas including: management of advanced medical technologies, industrial management, nursing management, elderly care services management, clinical research management, therapy management, medical administration, management and organization of health services in both the public and private sectors, and health policy planning, management, and formulation.

== Social impact of CLB legal clinics ==
The faculty of law runs six legal clinics, including immigration law, environmental law which was instrumental in the petition filed with the Supreme Court regarding the natural gas resources in Israel, prisoner rights clinic which stopped the privatization of the prisons in Israel and recently petitioned the Israeli high courts to increase the living space for prisoners and the government oversight clinic, which filed a petition to stop the government's move to a bi-annual budget instead of an annual budget.

According to the 2016 Israeli Bar Association exam results, The College of Law and Business submitted the second-largest number of students to the Israeli bar exam.

== International academic relations ==
The College has academic ties with academic institutions around the world. Each summer, CLB students are given the opportunity to attend internships, seminars, and workshops at Harvard university, Oxford University, Kassel University, Paris's ICC, and others.

== Statistics ==
The Academic Center for Law and Business has an average of approximately 4,000 students enrolled each year.

== Notable Achievements ==
In March 2005, the Human Rights Division of the Academic Center for Law and Business—led at the time by Attorney Aviv Wasserman and Attorney Effi Michaeli, together with retired Commissioner Shlomo Twizer—submitted a petition to the Supreme Court to revoke Amendment No. 28 to the Prisons Ordinance, which allowed for the establishment of a privately managed prison. After the petition was submitted, Attorneys Gilad Barnea and Yael Berda (currently a professor at the Hebrew University) also joined the legal team.

In the landmark decision, known as the "Privatization of Prisons Case," issued on November 19, 2009, the Supreme Court prohibited the establishment of a private prison.

For its actions in this matter, the Center was awarded the Gorney Prize for Public Law in 2010.

== See also ==
- Education in Israel
- Economy of Israel
