= Peres Academic Center =

Coordinates: 31.9005°N 34.7899°E

- המרכז האקדמי פרס
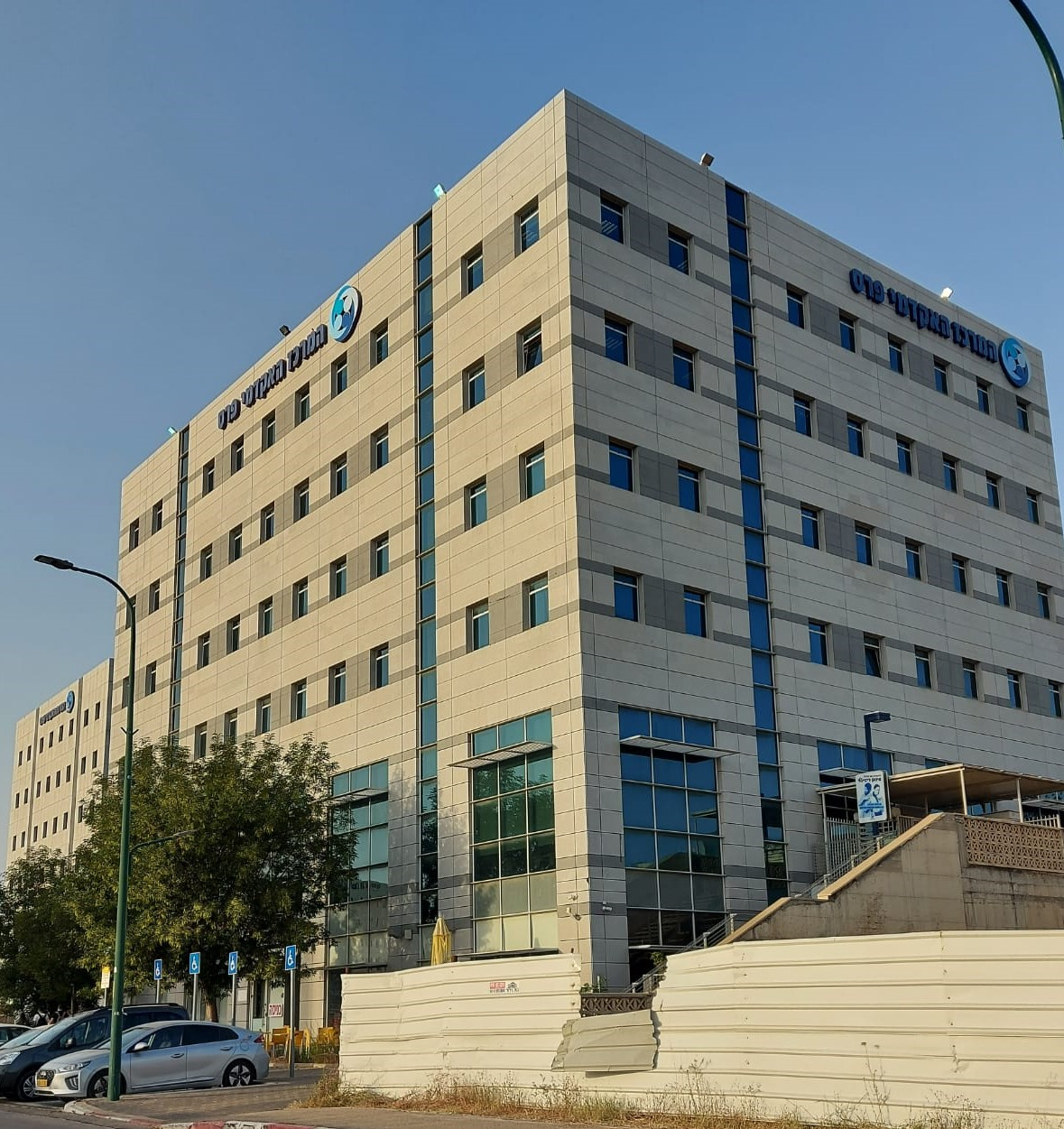
- Type: Private college
- Established: 2006
- Founders: Ofra Elul
- President: Professor Amos Drory
- Location: Rehovot, Israel
- Website: https://www.pac.ac.il/

The Peres Academic Center (Hebrew: המרכז האקדמי פרס Ha-Merkaz ha-Akademi Peres) is a private, not-for-profit, nonsectarian college in Rehovot, Israel.

Peres Academic Center, named after Shimon Peres, was founded in 2006 by Ofra Elul. The president is Prof. Amos Drory and the rector is Prof. Ron Shapira. In 2008 it was recognized by the Council for Higher Education in Israel.

in 2013 former US president Bill Clinton gave a speech in the Center.
