= List of law schools in Sweden =

This is a list of law schools in Sweden.

Master of Laws (Juristprogrammet):

- Uppsala University
- Lund University
- Stockholm University
- University of Gothenburg
- Umeå University
- Örebro University
- Karlstad University

Other educations in law:

- Linköping University (program in business law ("affärsjuridik"); not fully licensed for the full law degree program)
