= List of law schools in the Republic of Ireland =

This is a list of law schools in Ireland.

== Public ==
- Faculty of Law (University College Cork)
- School of Law (University of Galway)
- School of Law (Trinity College, Dublin)
- School of Law (Maynooth University)
- Sutherland School of Law (University College Dublin)
- School of Law (University of Limerick)
- School of Law and Government (Dublin City University)

== In Northern Ireland ==
- School of Law (Queen's University, Belfast)
- School of Law (Ulster University)

== Professional ==
- Kings Inns
- Law Society of Ireland

== IT sector ==
- Athlone Institute of Technology
- Dublin Institute of Technology
- Sligo Institute of Technology
- Letterkenny Institute of Technology
- Waterford Institute of Technology

== Non-public, affiliated to law schools in other jurisdictions ==
- Griffith College Dublin
- Griffith College Cork
- Dublin Business School Law School
- Independent College Dublin

== U.S. Law Schools running programmes in Ireland ==
- Fordham University
- University of Notre Dame
- University of Kansas
- Duquesne University
- University of Tulsa
- Quinnipiac University
- New England School of Law Boston
- University of Missouri
