= Charles White (New Zealand politician) =

New Zealand lawyer and politician (1880–1966)

The Honourable Charles White OBE

Member of the New Zealand Legislative Council
- In office 22 June 1950 – 31 December 1950

Personal details
- Born: Charles Gilbert White; 4 November 1880 Dunedin, New Zealand
- Died: 14 August 1966 (aged 85) Wellington, New Zealand
- Spouse: Nora Addison-Scott Ramsay (m. 1911)
- Children: 4
- Relatives: Annie Julia White (mother); John White (son); Douglas White (grandson); Keith Ramsay (father-in-law); Allan Holmes (uncle); Katherine McLean Holmes (aunt); Matthew Holmes (grandfather)
- Education: University of Otago
- Profession: Lawyer

Charles Gilbert White OBE (4 November 1880 – 14 August 1966) was a New Zealand lawyer and politician. He was appointed a member of the New Zealand Legislative Council on 22 June 1950.

== Early life and family ==
Born in the Dunedin suburb of Andersons Bay on 4 November 1880, White was the son of Annie Julia White (née Holmes)—an artist of some note and the daughter of Matthew Holmes—and John White, a barrister and solicitor. He was educated at Otago Boys' High School, and went on to study at the University of Otago, graduating with a Bachelor of Arts in 1901 and a Bachelor of Laws in 1903.

On 21 February 1911, White married Nora Addison-Scott Ramsay at First Church, Dunedin. She was the daughter of businessman and former mayor of Dunedin, Keith Ramsay. The couple went on to have four children, including John White (1911–2007) who became a judge of the High Court and was knighted in the 1982 New Year Honours.

White was a director of the Union Steam Ship Company. After the company moved its head office from Dunedin to Wellington in January 1923, the White family moved to Wellington the following month.

== Legal career ==
White began his legal career as a cadet in his father's firm in 1898, and became a partner in the Dunedin practice of his uncle, Allan Holmes, in 1904. He later went into partnership with Douglas Gilkison and Robert Ramsay, before forming the Wellington partnership of Young, White and Courtney in 1923. He left that firm in 1934, resuming practice on his own behalf in Wellington.

White held a number of commercial directorships, including of the Union Steam Ship Company of New Zealand, Union Airways of New Zealand, and Tasman Empire Airways.

== Legislative Council ==
White was appointed to the Legislative Council as a member of the suicide squad nominated by the First National Government in 1950 to vote for the abolition of the Council. Most of the new members (like White) were appointed on 22 June 1950, and served until 31 December 1950 when the Council was abolished.

== Other activities ==
White served as vice-president of the Wellington Lawn Tennis Association. He was active in the New Zealand Red Cross Society for many years, serving on the national council, first representing Otago and later Wellington. He served as chairman of the New Zealand Red Cross national executive from 1942 to 1946. In 1946, White represented Corso (the Council of Organisations for Relief Service Overseas) in New Zealand at the United Nations Relief and Rehabilitation Administration conference in Geneva. In the 1946 New Year Honours, he was appointed an Officer of the Order of the British Empire, for services to the New Zealand Red Cross Society.

== Death ==
White died on 14 August 1966, and his ashes were buried at Karori Cemetery, Wellington. His wife, Nora, died in 1970.
