= Ann Ballin =

New Zealand activist (1932–2003)

Dame Reubina Ann Ballin ONZ DBE (20 February 1932 – 2 September 2003) was a New Zealand psychologist and victims' rights advocate. In 2002, she was accorded New Zealand's highest civilian honour, membership of the Order of New Zealand.

== Biography ==
Born in Hamilton in 1932, Ballin was educated at St Hilda's Collegiate School in Dunedin and Waikato Diocesan School in Hamilton. In her mid-teens, she developed a neurological condition that attacked her spinal column, that made her reliant on a wheelchair for the remainder of her life.

Ballin attended Auckland University College and the University of Canterbury, graduating BA in 1961 and MA in 1964. Her master's thesis was on learning in patients receiving electro-convulsive therapy. A qualified psychologist, she worked as a student counsellor at the University of Canterbury from 1974 to 1986, and served as president of the New Zealand Psychological Society from 1979 to 1980. She was the society's first female president.

She chaired the Victims' Task Force from 1988 to 1993 and pioneered changes in the criminal justice system to improve justice for victims of crime. Between 1987 and 1995, she chaired the New Zealand Council for Recreation and served on the Hillary Commission on Recreation and Sport from 1987 to 1990. From 1987 to 1988, she was a member of the Royal Commission on Social Policy and between 1980 and 1982 she was chairperson of the national committee of the International Year of Disabled Persons.

Ballin died in Christchurch on 2 September 2003.

== Honours and awards ==
In the 1982 New Year Honours, Ballin was appointed a Commander of the Order of the British Empire, for services to disabled people. She was promoted to Dame Commander of the same order in the 1993 New Year Honours, for services to the community.

Ballin received the New Zealand 1990 Commemoration Medal, and was awarded an honorary LittD degree by the University of Canterbury in 2001.

In the 2002 Queen's Birthday and Golden Jubilee Honours, Ballin was appointed an additional member of the Order of New Zealand.

In 2008 the New Zealand Psychological Society instituted the Ballin Award. The award is given every four years, to a "Member/Fellow of the Society who is deemed to have made a notably significant contribution in the Aotearoa/New Zealand context, to the development or enhancement of clinical psychology". Recipients include Ian Lambie (2008), Suzanne Blackwell (2011), Julia Rucklidge (2015), and Waikaremoana Waitoki (2019).
