= Bramwell Cook =

Bramwell Cook may refer to:

- Bramwell Cook (Salvation Army officer) (1903–1994), New Zealand Salvation Army officer
- Bramwell Cook (gastroenterologist) (1936–2017), New Zealand gastroenterologist
