= Douglas White (jurist) =

New Zealand jurist

The Honourable Sir Douglas White KNZM KC
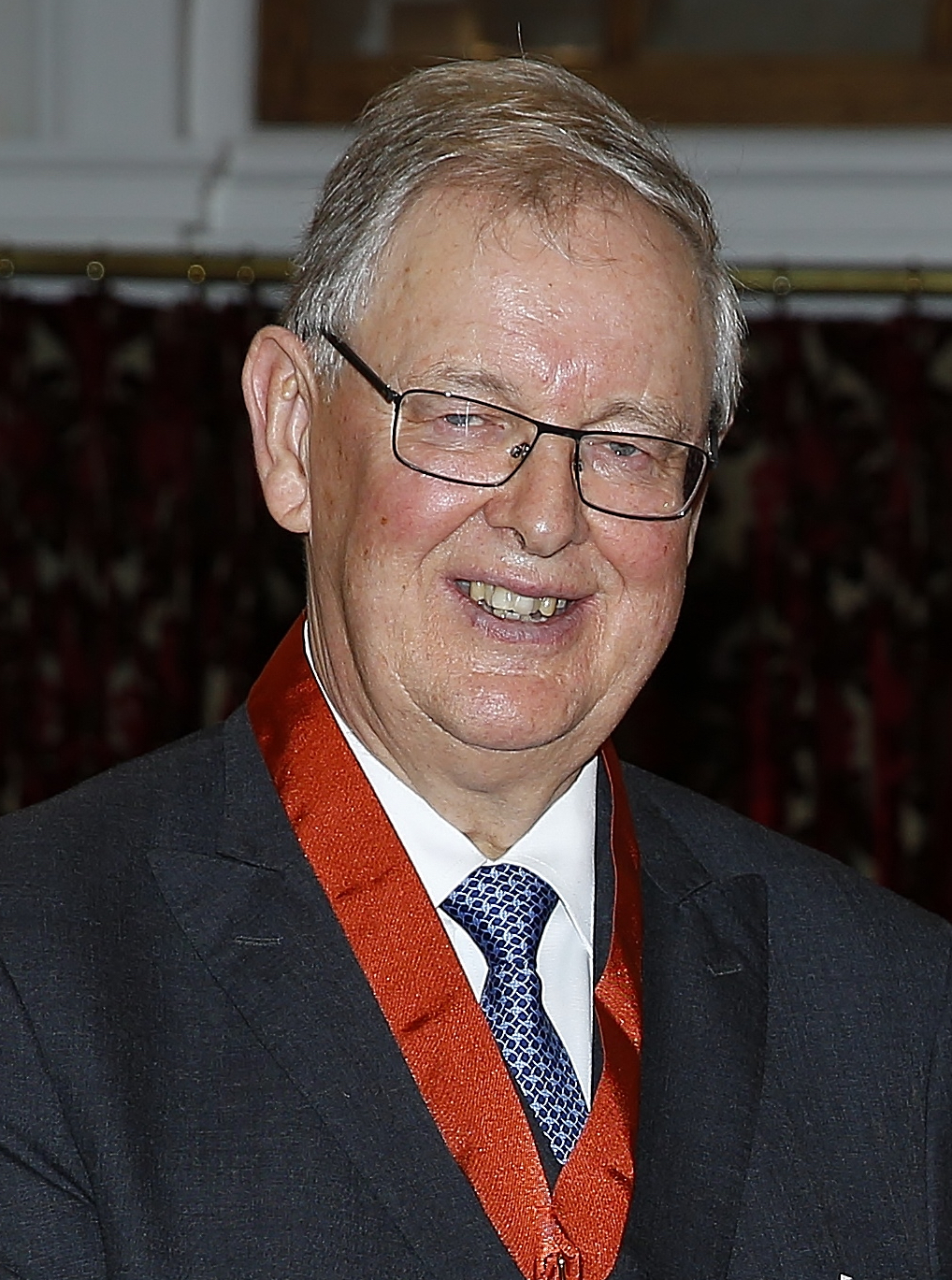
- White in 2018

Chancellor of Victoria University of Wellington
- In office 1996–1999
- Preceded by: Elizabeth Orr
- Succeeded by: Russell Marshall

Personal details
- Born: Douglas John White; 5 September 1945 (age 80) Wellington, New Zealand
- Relatives: John White (father); Richard Wild (uncle); Charles White (grandfather); Leonard Wild (grandfather); Annie Julia White (great-grandmother); Keith Ramsay (great-grandfather); Matthew Holmes (great-great-grandfather)
- Occupation: Lawyer

Sir Douglas John White KNZM KC (born 5 September 1945) is a former New Zealand jurist.

== Early life and family ==
White was born in Wellington in 1945. The jurist Sir John White (1911–2007) was his father, and Charles White, a lawyer and briefly a member of the Legislative Council, was his grandfather. He was educated as a boarder at Nelson College from 1959 to 1963, and went on to study law at Victoria University of Wellington, graduating Bachelor of Laws with first-class honours.

== Legal career ==
After practising as a litigation partner and then independent barrister, White was appointed Queen's Counsel in 1988. He sat as a judge of the High Court from 2009 until 2012, when he was appointed to the bench of the Court of Appeal. He retired in 2015. In 2016, White was appointed to the Cook Islands Court of Appeal.

== Other activities ==
White served on the council of Victoria University of Wellington for 20 years, and was chancellor of the university from 1996 to 1999.

== Honours ==
In the 2018 New Year Honours, White was appointed a Knight Companion of the New Zealand Order of Merit, for services to the judiciary.
