= David Smith (judge) =

New Zealand lawyer, judge, educationalist

Sir Sir David Stanley Smith
- Born: 11 February 1888; Dunedin, Otago, New Zealand
- Died: 29 December 1982 (aged 94); Wellington, New Zealand
- Occupations: Lawyer, judge, educationalist
- Known for: Counsel for Maori land claims; Supreme Court judge
- Children: Shirley Smith
- Awards: Knight Bachelor (1948); Queen Elizabeth II Coronation Medal (1953)

Sir David Stanley Smith (11 February 1888 – 29 December 1982) was a New Zealand lawyer, judge and educationalist.

Smith was born in Dunedin, Otago, New Zealand in 1888. He worked for Charles Morison as an assistant from 1912. He Smith was appointed as a judge to the Supreme Court in 1928, a relatively early appointment based on his performance as counsel for Maori land claims. Smith received a knighthood in the 1948 New Year Honours. A few months later, he resigned as a judge and concentrated on public affairs. In 1953, he was awarded the Queen Elizabeth II Coronation Medal.

Smith was a member of the Victoria University College Council (1939–1945) and in 1945 became chancellor of the University of New Zealand. For his services to tertiary education, he received honorary doctorates from the University of Oxford (1948) and the University of New Zealand (1961).

He died in Wellington on 29 December 1982 and his ashes were buried at Karori Cemetery. His daughter, Shirley Smith, became a lawyer.
