= 1966 Special Honours (New Zealand) =

Awards list for New Zealand

The 1966 Special Honours in New Zealand were two special honours lists, dated 4 March and 23 September 1966, in which a judge and a soldier were recognised.

== Order of Saint Michael and Saint George ==
=== Companion (CMG) ===
- Herbert Richard Churton Wild ED QC – Chief Justice of New Zealand.

== Order of the British Empire ==
=== Member (MBE) ===
Military division

- Captain Graham Douglas Birch – of Waiouru; Royal Regiment of New Zealand Artillery (Regular Force). In recognition of his services during operations in Vietnam.
