= John White (jurist) =

New Zealand jurist (1911–2007)

The Honourable Sir John White MBE QC
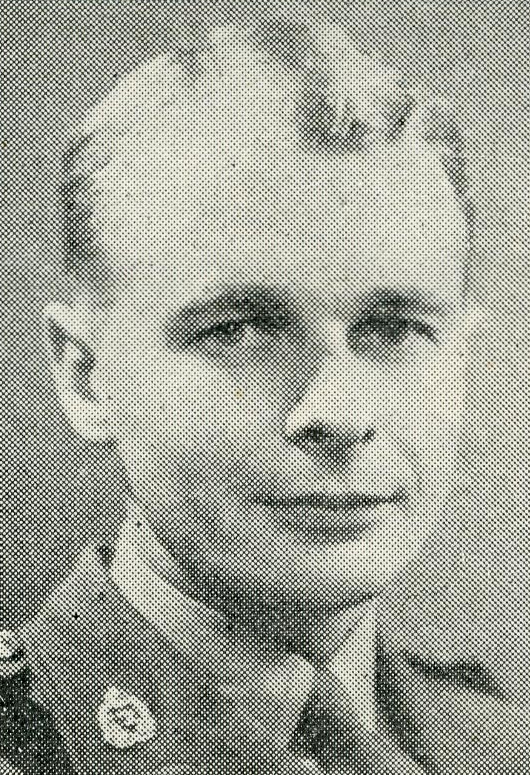
- White, c. 1943

Solicitor-General of New Zealand
- In office 1966–1970
- Prime Minister: Keith Holyoake
- Preceded by: Richard Wild
- Succeeded by: Richard Savage

Personal details
- Born: John Charles White; 1 November 1911 Andersons Bay, New Zealand
- Died: 27 October 2007 (aged 95) Wellington, New Zealand
- Spouse(s): Dora Wild (m. 1943; died 1982) Elspeth Fletcher (m. 1987)
- Children: 4
- Relatives: Charles White (father); Douglas White (son); Leonard Wild (father-in-law); Richard Wild (brother-in-law); Annie Julia White (grandmother); Keith Ramsay (grandfather); Matthew Holmes (great-grandfather)

Sir John Charles White MBE QC (1 November 1911 – 27 October 2007) was a New Zealand jurist. During World War II, he served as personal assistant and aide-de-camp to General Bernard Freyberg. After some years as solicitor-general, he was appointed a judge at the Supreme Court.

== Early life ==
White was born at Eldin, a building in Andersons Bay near Dunedin, New Zealand, in 1911. (Note: The obituary published by the New Zealand Law Society incorrectly states that he was born in Wellington.) His parents were Charles White and Nora (née Ramsay). His maternal grandfather was Keith Ramsay, a businessman and former mayor of Dunedin. His paternal grandparents were John White, a solicitor in Dunedin, and Annie Julie (née Holmes), an artist. He received the first part of his secondary education at John McGlashan College in Dunedin. As his father was a director of the Union Steam Ship Company and that company moved its head office from Dunedin to Wellington in January 1923, the White family moved to Wellington the following month. He continued his education at Wellesley College in Wellington Central (the school has since moved to Days Bay). He obtained a Master of Laws from Victoria University College. During his student days, he represented Victoria in tennis and cricket.

== Professional life and war service ==
After he graduated from Victoria, he took courses in shorthand and typing. This enabled him to work as an associate to judges, and in 1937 and 1938, he first worked for Justice Hubert Ostler and then for Justice Peter Quilliam. During 1939, he travelled through Europe with friends and returned home just before World War II started. Ostler was friends with General Bernard Freyberg and had recommended White to Freyberg based on his shorthand and typing skills. In January 1940, White was invited to meet Freybert and within 36 hours, he was commissioned as a second lieutenant, and became his personal assistant and aide-de-camp. Freyberg and White left for Egypt on 5 January 1940. White was responsible for writing the general's diary, attended all his meetings, listened in on all his phone calls via a second set, was on the frontline whenever Freyberg went there, and took many photographs. All through this period, White was aware that his work would likely be the basis of future history analysis. White served for Freyberg until 1945, with the general expressing his admiration:

Speaking from my own point of view, I shall miss you for a long time. It seems hard for me to understand that you are not in the lean-to at the side of my caravan. I think you know how much you have meant to—Your devoted GOC (Note: General Officer Commanding)—Bernard Freyberg.

White returned to Wellington after the war and from 1945 to 1966, he was a partner with Young, Bennett, Virtue and White. His field of work was personal injury and accident compensation. White served as solicitor-general from 1966 to 1970 and succeeded Richard Wild in this role, who was his brother-in-law. He was appointed judge at the Supreme Court in 1970 and retired from it in 1981 (the previous year, it had been renamed High Court). He was recalled as an acting High Court judge in 1982 and served until 1984. In 1983, he conducted a royal commission into the 1982 Fijian general election. From 1984 to 1986, he was the acting chief justice of the Solomon Islands and was a member of their Court of Appeal during that time.

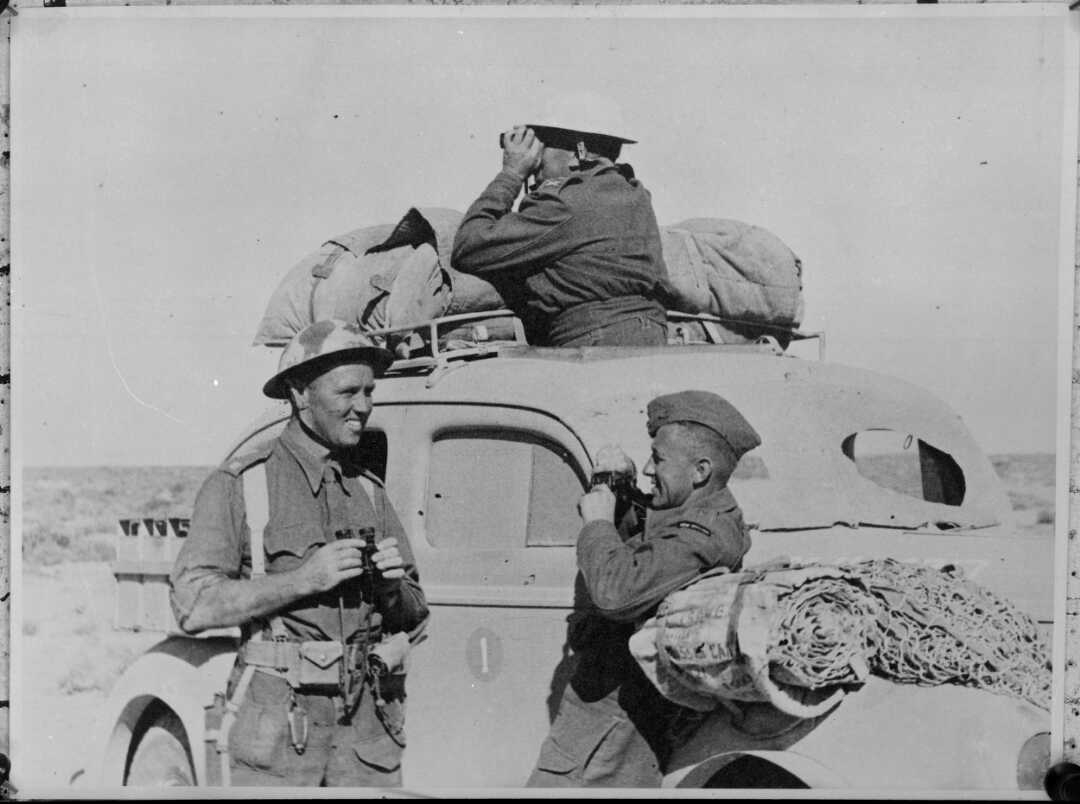
Lieutenant Giff Vivian (left) talks to Jack Griffiths while General Bernard Freyberg carries out reconnaissance (Libya, 1941; photo by White)

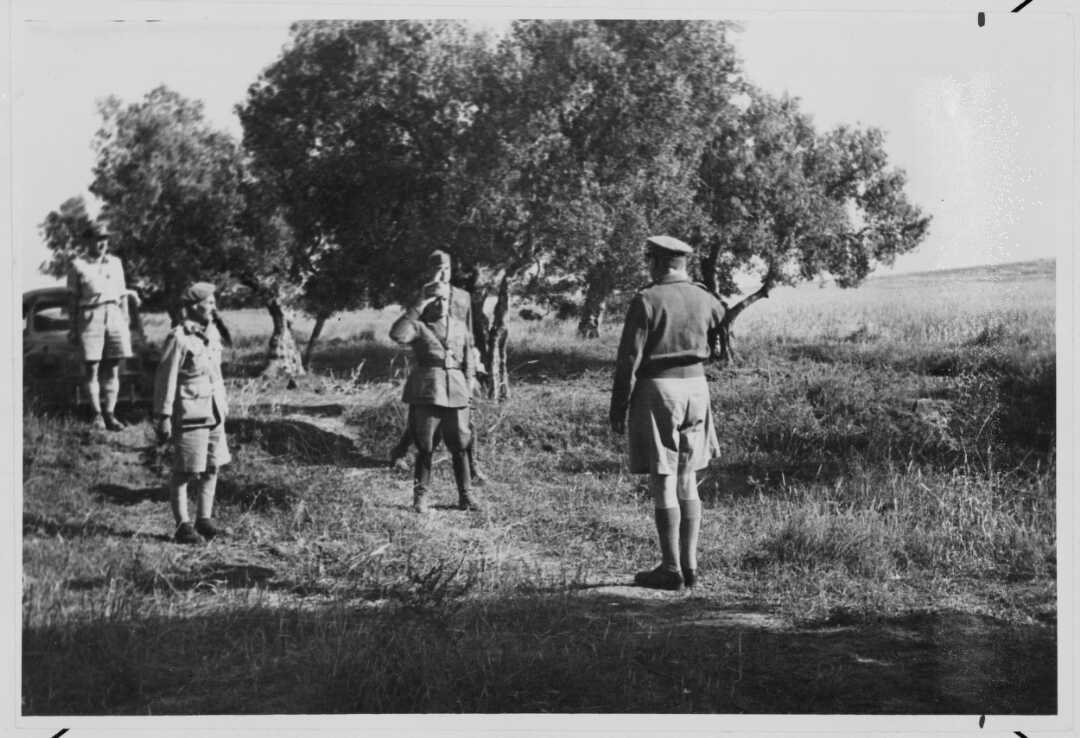
Field Marshal Giovanni Messe surrenders to General Freyberg (Tunisia, 1943; photo by White)

== Community service ==
White was active for the law society and sat on many committees. In 1963, he was a member of the Committee on Absolute Liability. He was a member of the Council of Law Reporting and of the Law Revision Commission. He was councillor and then chairman of the Council of Legal Education. He was president of the Wellington District Law Society in 1961. He was vice president of the New Zealand Law Society and was a Wellington representative for the national body. He represented the World Peace through Law conferences in Athens in 1963 and in Washington DC in 1965. He was a representative of the New Zealand judiciary at the Law–Asia Conference during the 1970s.

For the army, he acted in an unpaid capacity after the war. He held the role of director of Army Legal Services (1955–1966) and for the following 20 years, he was judge advocate general for the army, fleet and airforce. White was active with the Royal New Zealand Returned and Services' Association and rose to the rank of national vice-president. One of his special interests was war pensions and he appeared before parliamentary committee responsible for the matter.

== Honours and awards ==
On 18 February 1943, White was made a Member of the Order of the British Empire (military division), in recognition of gallant and distinguished services in the Middle East during the period May to October 1942. In 1966, he was appointed a Queen's Counsel. In the 1982 New Year Honours, he was made a Knight Bachelor.

== Family and death ==
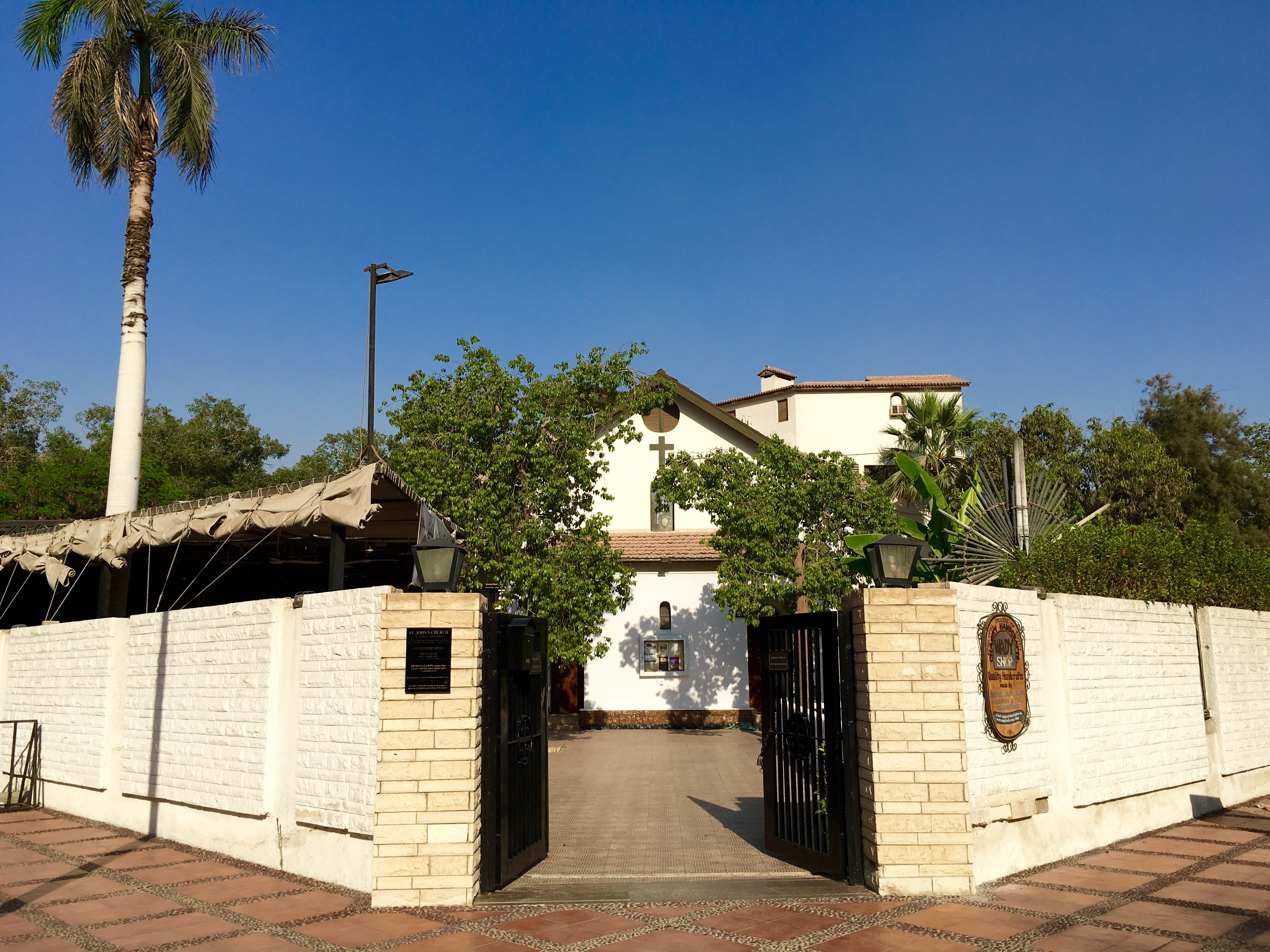
The wedding venue: Church of St John the Baptist in Maadi, Egypt

White met his future wife, Dora Wild, at Victoria University College. Her father was the agricultural lecturer and scientist Leonard Wild. Both White and Wild went on military service—with her belonging to the Voluntary Aid Detachment—and they both served in Egypt. They had a military wedding in Maadi in October 1943 at St John's Church. Jack Griffiths, another aide-de-camp, was White's best man and his wife was given away by her brother, Richard Wild. They were to have three daughters and one son, Douglas White, who also became a jurist. His wife died in 1982. In 1987, White married the widow Elspeth Fletcher. White died in Wellington on 27 October 2007. His ashes were buried at Makara Cemetery next to the grave of his first wife.

== See also ==
- List of King's and Queen's Counsel in New Zealand
