= Waikaremoana (disambiguation) =

Waikaremoana normally refers to Lake Waikaremoana, but may also refer to:

- Waikaremoana (New Zealand electorate), which existed from 1984 to 1996
- Waikaremoana Waitoki, a clinical psychologist
