= John Denniston (judge) =

New Zealand lawyer and judge (1845–1919)

Sir John Denniston
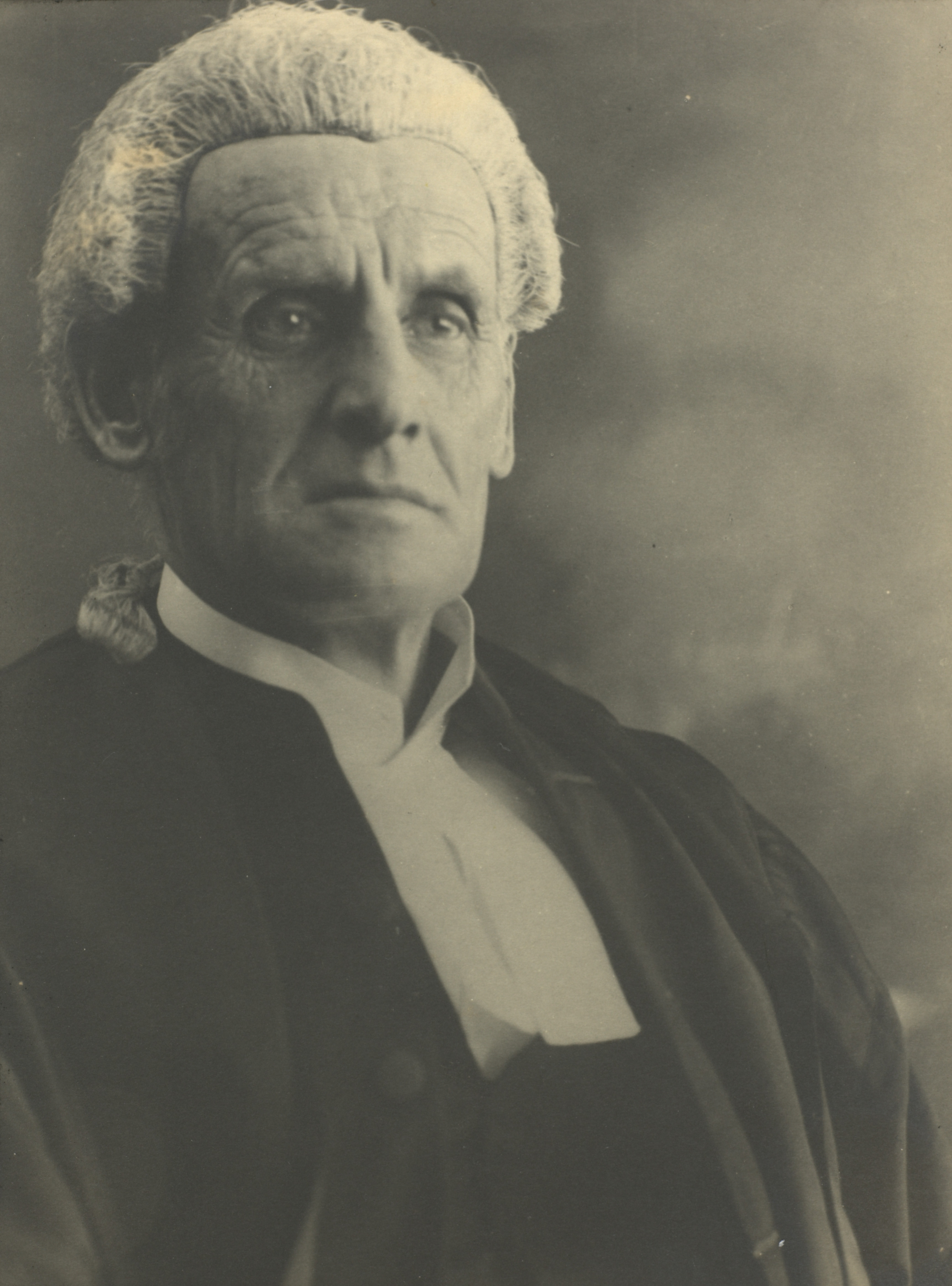
- John Denniston in a barrister's wig

Personal details
- Born: John Edward Dennsiton; 20 June 1845 Bishopton, Renfrewshire, Scotland
- Died: 22 July 1919 (aged 74) Cashmere, Christchurch, New Zealand
- Spouse: Helen Mary Bathgate (m. 1887)
- Relations: Thomas Denniston (father)

Sir John Edward Denniston (20 June 1845 – 22 July 1919) was a judge of the Supreme Court in Christchurch, New Zealand.

Denniston was born at Bishopton, Renfrewshire, Scotland, in 1845. He was the son of Thomas Denniston, merchant, and Helen Franch Walker, daughter of Gabriel Walker, Glasgow. His mother died in 1855 after giving birth to his youngest brother. He received his school education at Greenock Academy and at Blairlodge School.

Having matriculated at the University of Glasgow, where he won an entrance scholarship, he left that university to join his father and other members of the family to emigrate to New Zealand. They landed in Otago in 1862 and Denniston Sr. took up a run Oteramika in Southland. His father died at his house at Fendalton, Christchurch, in 1897. Denniston Jr saw service in various capacities, including the civil service and that of the Bank of New South Wales, and then became a law student with William Downie Stewart. He was admitted to the New Zealand Bar at Dunedin by Justice Chapman on 4 August 1874. For some months he practised at Wanganui in partnership with George Hutchison, afterwards a prominent member of the House of Representatives. In 1875, he became associated with Downie Stewart in Dunedin and the firm was subsequently joined by Allan Holmes, son of the Hon. Mathew Holmes, MLC, under the style of Stewart, Holmes and Denniston, and acquired an extensive practice in Otago. Court work was undertaken by Denniston, whose name was connected with most of the important civil and criminal cases in the province. In 1889, he was elevated to the bench on the death of Justice Alexander James Johnston and was sworn in by His Honour Sir James Prendergast, Chief Justice of New Zealand, in February 1889. Denniston was knighted on 21 February 1917 upon his retirement from the bench.

Denniston was married on 15 November 1887, to Helen Mary, daughter of the Hon. John Bathgate, MLC, and had three sons and two daughters. He died on 22 July 1919 at his residence in Cashmere after a brief illness. He was survived by his wife.
