= Suzanne Blackwell =

New Zealand clinical and forensic psychologist

Suzanne Blackwell MNZM
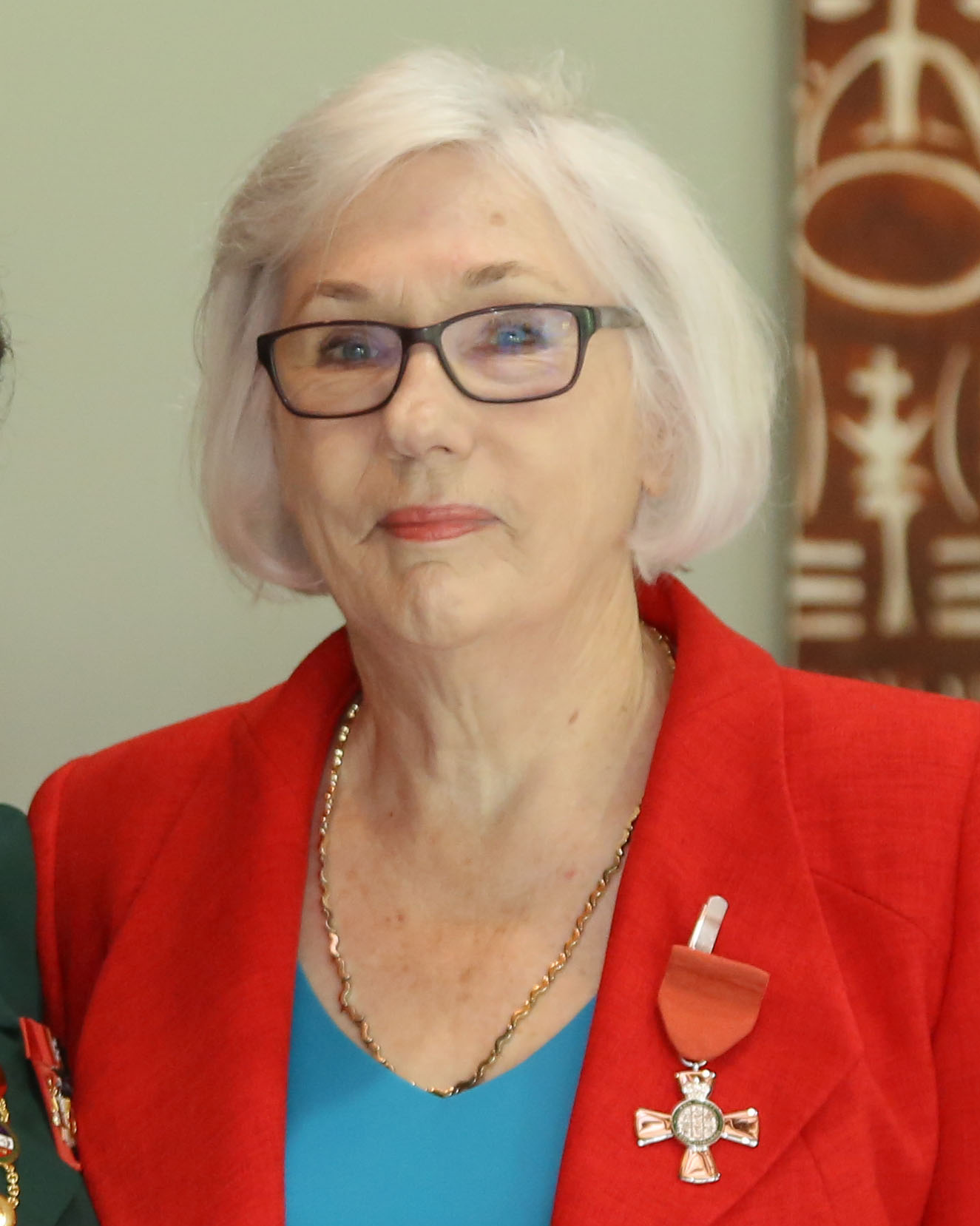
- Blackwell in October 2024
- Awards: Member of the New Zealand Order of Merit

Academic background
- Education: University of Auckland
- Thesis: Child sexual abuse on trial (2007)
- Doctoral advisor: Fred Seymour

Suzanne Joy Yerex Blackwell MNZM is a New Zealand clinical psychologist, and holds an honorary position at the University of Auckland. In 2024 Blackwell was appointed a Member of the New Zealand Order of Merit for services to clinical and forensic psychology and the law.

== Academic career ==
Blackwell completed a PhD titled Child sexual abuse on trial at the University of Auckland in 2007. She is an honorary academic at the university. Blackwell is a clinical psychologist who works in the areas of child sexual abuse and professional ethics. Blackwell has appeared as an expert witness at a number of court trials, including that of Peter Ellis, where she was a witness for the Crown.

Blackwell has researched how a juror's misconceptions about sexual abuse might affect their decision-making in court, and has provided expert evidence to courts on counter-intuitive behaviour in complainants, such as why complainants might delay taking action, retract their complaints, or might stay in contact with abusers.

Blackwell has chaired conduct committees for the New Zealand Board of Psychologists. She co-founded the Family Court Psychologists’ Specialist Report Writers Association. Blackwell was an editor and author of the 2018 Psychology and the Law in Aotearoa New Zealand.

== Honours and awards ==
In 2011 Blackwell was awarded the Ballin Award by the New Zealand Psychological Society for her contribution to clinical psychology. In the 2024 King's Birthday Honours Blackwell was appointed a Member of the New Zealand Order of Merit for services to clinical and forensic psychology and the law.

== Selected works ==
- Seymour, Fred; Blackwell, Suzanne; Tamatea, Armon (2018). Psychology and the Law in Aotearoa New Zealand. New Zealand Psychological Society. p. 381. ISBN 9780473449643.
- Isabel Randell; Seymour, Frederick William; Emily Henderson; Blackwell, Suzanne Joy Y. (2017). "The Experiences of Young Complainant Witnesses in Criminal Court Trials for Sexual Offences". Psychiatry Psychology and Law. 25 (3): 357–373. doi:10.1080/13218719.2017.1396866. PMC 6818346. PMID 31984025. Wikidata Q92954147.
- Blackwell, Suzanne Joy Y.; Seymour, Frederick William (2015). "Expert Evidence and Jurors' Views on Expert Witnesses". Psychiatry Psychology and Law. 22 (5): 673–681. doi:10.1080/13218719.2015.1063181. Wikidata Q131189840.
- Isabel Randell; Seymour, Frederick William; McCann, Clare; Blackwell, Suzanne Joy Y. (2021). "The experiences of young witnesses and caregivers in Aotearoa New Zealand's Sexual Violence Pilot Courts". Psychiatry Psychology and Law. 29 (1): 134–153. doi:10.1080/13218719.2021.1904449. PMID 35693387. Wikidata Q131189839.
- Blackwell, Suzanne Joy Y.; Seymour, Frederick William (2013). "Prediction of Jury Verdicts in Child Sexual Assault Trials". Psychiatry Psychology and Law. 21 (4): 567–576. doi:10.1080/13218719.2013.856278. Wikidata Q131189846.
- Seymour, Frederick William; Blackwell, Suzanne Joy Y.; Sarah Calvert; Briar McLean (2013). "Counterintuitive Expert Psychological Evidence in Child Sexual Abuse Trials in New Zealand". Psychiatry Psychology and Law. 21 (4): 511–522. doi:10.1080/13218719.2013.839930. Wikidata Q131189845.
- Yvonne Woodhead; Cameron, Dianne; Blackwell, Suzanne Joy Y.; Seymour, Frederick William (2014). "Family Court Judges' Decisions Regarding Post-Separation Care Arrangements for Young Children". Psychiatry Psychology and Law. 22 (4): 520–534. doi:10.1080/13218719.2014.960034. Wikidata Q131189844.
