= List of honorary doctors of the University of New Zealand =

The following is a complete list of honorary (also known as honoris causa) doctorates issued by the University of New Zealand before it was disestablished in 1961 and its constituent colleges raised to full university status. It does not include normal doctorates of the same name which were awarded over the same period.

Year	Recipient	Degree
1931	Ernest Rutherford	DSc
1932	Leonard Cockayne	DSc
1935	Diamond Jenness	LittD
1937	Te Rangi Hīroa	DSc
1940	George Julius	DSc
1941	William Sinclair Marris	LittD
1942	William Benham	DSc
1943	Alexander Aitken	DSc
1948	Āpirana Ngata	LittD
1949	William Beveridge	LittD
1949	Ronald Syme	LittD
1949	Patrick Marshall	DSc
1950	Thomas Hunter	LittD
1950	Raymond Priestley	DSc
1951	Noel Benson	DSc
1951	James Hight	LLD
1951	James B. Conant	DSc
1952	Bernard Freyberg	LLD
1953	Bruce Levy	DSc
1954	Charles Cotton	LLD
1955	Arthur Sims	LLD
1955	Howard Kippenberger	LLD
1955	Harold Mattingly	LittD
1955	John Tresidder Sheppard	LittD
1956	William Davies	DSc
1957	Macfarlane Burnet	LLD
1957	John B. Condliffe	LittD
1957	Baden Powell	DSc
1957	Theodore Rigg	DSc
1957	Leonard Wild	DSc
1959	Henry Forder	DSc
1960	Lawrence Bragg	DSc
1960	Arnold Wall	DSc
1961	Charles Lyttelton	LLD
1961	William Hollis Cocker	LLD
1961	George Currie	LLD
1961	Ian Gordon	LittD
1961	Arthur Porritt	LLD
1961	David Smith	LLD
1961	Duncan Stout	LLD
