= James Healy (geologist) =

New Zealand geologist

James Healy OBE
- Born: 10 September 1910; Devonport, New Zealand
- Died: 10 December 1994 (aged 84); Auckland, New Zealand
- Education: Auckland University College
- Scientific career
- Fields: Geology; volcanology

James Healy OBE (10 September 1910 – 10 December 1994) was a New Zealand geologist, volcanologist and music critic. He was born in Devonport, Auckland, New Zealand, on 10 September 1910.

In the 1982 New Year Honours, he was appointed an Officer of the Order of the British Empire, for services to geology and the community.

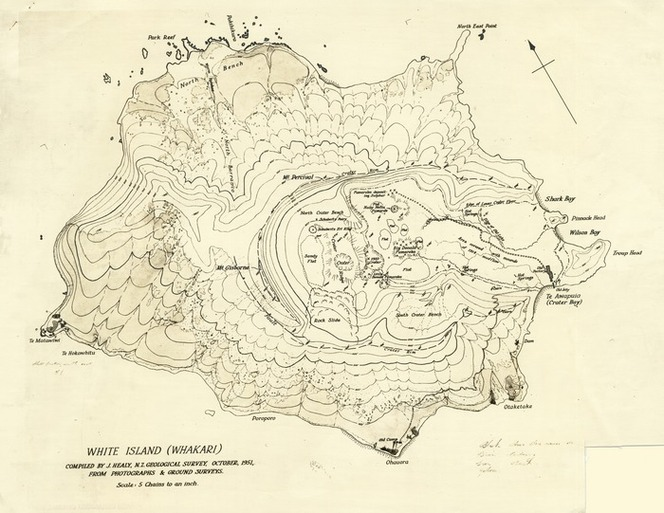
Map of Whakaari (White Island) drawn by Healy
