= Patrick Eisdell Moore =

New Zealand surgeon

Sir Patrick Eisdell Moore OBE
- Born: 17 March 1918; Bristol, England
- Died: 18 June 2015 (aged 97); Auckland, New Zealand
- Education: University of Otago
- Spouse: Beth Beedie (m. 1942)
- Scientific career
- Fields: Otolaryngology

Sir Patrick William Eisdell Moore OBE (17 March 1918 – 18 June 2015) was a New Zealand surgeon and medical researcher. He was a pioneer in cochlear implants, and was the first person in the world to perform an eardrum transplant.

== Early life and education ==
Moore was born in Bristol, England on 17 March 1918, the son of Alice Moore (née Lofthouse) and her husband, New Zealand surgeon Arthur Eisdell Moore who served with the Royal Army Medical Corps. He was named William Ernest Moore but nicknamed 'Pat', having been born on St Patrick's Day; as an adult he changed his name by deed poll to Patrick William Eisdell Moore. He was educated at Auckland Grammar School, and then studied medicine at the University of Otago, from where he graduated MB ChB in 1943.

== Career ==
Moore worked as a house surgeon at Auckland Hospital before enlisting and serving as a medical officer in World War II with the Second New Zealand Expeditionary Force. A number of sources record that he was the only Pākehā in the 28th Māori Battalion, however other Pākehā are recorded as serving in the battalion such as Charles Bennet and Campbell D'Arcy, who served as the battalion's doctor before Moore. It was during his time with the battalion that he became versed in biculturalism and learnt te reo Māori.

Moore's interest in specialising in Ear, Nose and Throat (ENT) surgery was kindled on his return to New Zealand and Auckland Hospital in 1946. From 1948 to 1952 he trained and worked at the Royal National Throat, Nose and Ear Hospital in London and in Northampton. He set up a private practice in Auckland in 1952 and joined the ENT department at Green Lane Hospital in 1954 later becoming head of department. There he developed surgery and research in all aspects of the specialty and pioneered homografts. He carried out the first transplant of an eardrum (tympanic membrane) in 1965.

In 1962 Moore founded the Deafness Research Foundation (now the Hearing Research Foundation) to promote research into hearing conditions. Moore's knowledge of tikanga Māori and the language led to a commitment to treating ear diseases in Māori communities on the East Coast of the North Island. There he developed ear surgery and trained other health professionals and began using mobile clinics to treat ear infections in rural communities. The success of the clinics led to similar clinics in Northland and Auckland.

Moore served as president of the Otolaryngological Society of New Zealand, introduced ENT teaching in the University of Auckland Medical School and promoted the use of cochlear implants. He was also did sketches in particular a 1940 caricature of the Otago Medical School staff. His autobiography So Old So Quick was published in 2004.

== Honours and awards ==
In the 1982 New Year Honours, Moore was appointed an Officer of the Order of the British Empire, for services to otolaryngology and the community, and he was made a Knight Bachelor, for services to otolaryngology, in the 1992 New Year Honours.

== Personal life ==
Moore met his wife Beth Beedie at university where she was studying physiotherapy; they married on 21 December 1942 in Dannevirke. The couple had four sons, two of whom became doctors and two lawyers.

Moore died in Auckland on 18 June 2015. His wife, Beth, Lady Moore, died on 7 August 2017.

== Legacy ==
The Eisdell Moore Centre at the University of Auckland was established in 2017 to research, prevent and treat ear disorders.
