= Leonard Wild =

New Zealand teacher, agricultural scientist

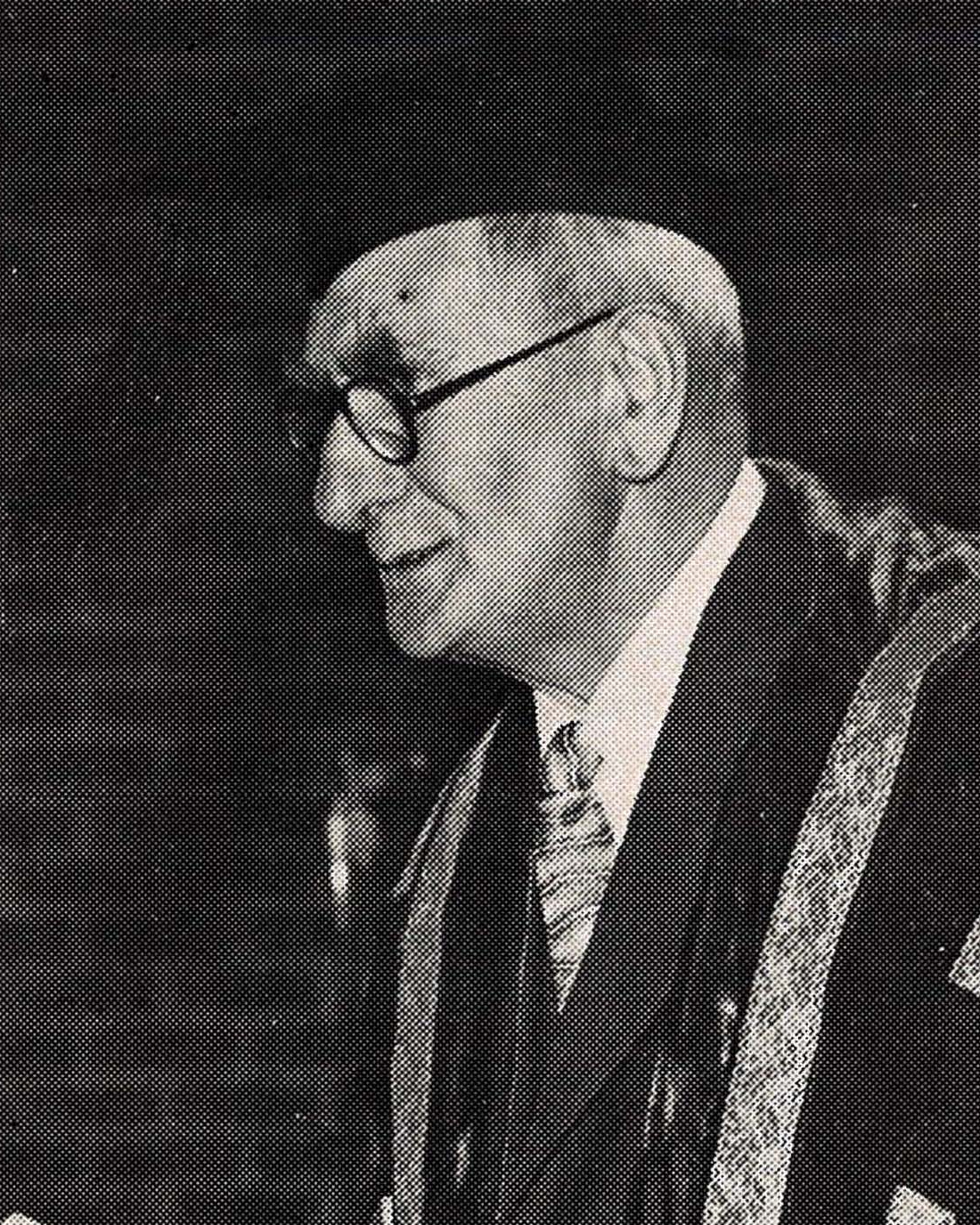
Wild, c. 1960

Leonard John Wild CBE (28 October 1889 – 23 July 1970) was a New Zealand teacher, agricultural scientist, lecturer, principal, educationalist, and writer.

== Early life ==
Born at Oraki near Riverton in Southland in 1889, he received his secondary education at Southland Boys' High School. He received his tertiary education from the University of Otago and graduated with a Bachelor of Arts in 1910, a Bachelor of Science in 1917 and a Master of Arts in 1921. During the 1910s, he published several papers on geology in the Transactions and Proceedings of the New Zealand Institute, which resulted in him being elected fellow of the Geological Society of London.

== Career ==
In 1911, he was appointed as a science teacher at Marlborough High School (now Marlborough Boys' College) when it was still a coeducational school. In 1915, he became chemistry lecturer at Canterbury Agricultural College (now Lincoln University) in Lincoln, New Zealand. In 1921, Wild was science lecturer at Christchurch Teachers' College. In the following year, he moved to the Feilding Technical High School to become the inaugural headmaster. Wild's management of the school gave it both a national and international reputation, and Peter Fraser as minister of Education gave funding for the school to become Feilding Agricultural High School. Wild retired at the end of 1946.

Wild was a member of the Senate of the University of New Zealand from 1930 until its dissolution in 1961. From 1949 to its dissolution, he was pro–chancellor for the institution.

== Honours and awards ==
In the 1946 New Year Honours, Wild was appointed Officer of the Order of the British Empire. In the 1952 Birthday Honours, he was promoted to be a Commander of the same order. In 1953, he was awarded the Queen Elizabeth II Coronation Medal. The University of New Zealand made Wild an honorary Doctor of Science in 1957.

== Family and death ==
Wild married Doris Churton (1890–1982) in December 1911 at Invercargill's All Saints Anglican. They had four children. Their son Richard Wild was Chief Justice of New Zealand from 1966 to 1978. Their only daughter, Dora, married the jurist John White.

On 23 July 1970, Wild died in Wellington. He was survived by his wife and four children. He was cremated in Wellington.

== See also ==
- List of honorary doctors of the University of New Zealand
