= Thomas Denniston =

New Zealand farmer and newspaper editor

Thomas Denniston (28 March 1821 – 14 September 1897) was a New Zealand farmer and newspaper editor. He was born in Greenock, Renfrewshire, Scotland on 28 March 1821. He contested the Mataura electorate in the 1871 election but of the three candidates, he came last. His eldest son, Sir John Denniston, was a judge at the Supreme Court in Christchurch.
