= Annie Julia White =

New Zealand artist (1852–1932)

- Born: Ann Julia Holmes; 1852; Geelong, Victoria, Australia
- Died: 24 October 1932 (aged 80); Dunedin, New Zealand
- Occupation: Painter
- Spouse: John White (m. 1876)
- Children: 6
- Relatives: Matthew Holmes (father); Charles White (son); Katherine McLean Holmes (sister); Allan Holmes (brother); George McLean (brother-in-law); John White (grandson); Douglas White (great-grandson)

Ann Julia White (née Holmes; 1852 – 24 October 1932) was a New Zealand painter. Born in Australia, she moved with her family to Dunedin as a child. She was active in the Otago Art Society and in the Presbyterian Church.

== Life and career ==
White was born in Geelong, Australia, in 1852. She was the youngest daughter of Matthew Holmes. The family moved to Edinburgh in 1854 and subsequently to Dunedin, New Zealand, in 1864, when she was 12 years old. White and her sisters were privately educated, with arts and music teachers including arts lessons in Paris. Her sister Katherine McLean Holmes was also an artist, and her brother Allan Holmes was a cricketer and lawyer.

On 5 October 1876 she married John White, a lawyer. Her wedding dress is held in the collection of the Toitū Otago Settlers Museum. The Whites had seven children, including politician Charles White. They lived for many years in the Dunedin suburb of Andersons Bay, where White was a supporter of the Presbyterian Church and founder of the Presbyterian Women's Missionary Union. She was also a singer and performed in local productions. Her obituary in the Evening Star noted that the family was "one of the most important in the district". John White died in 1904.

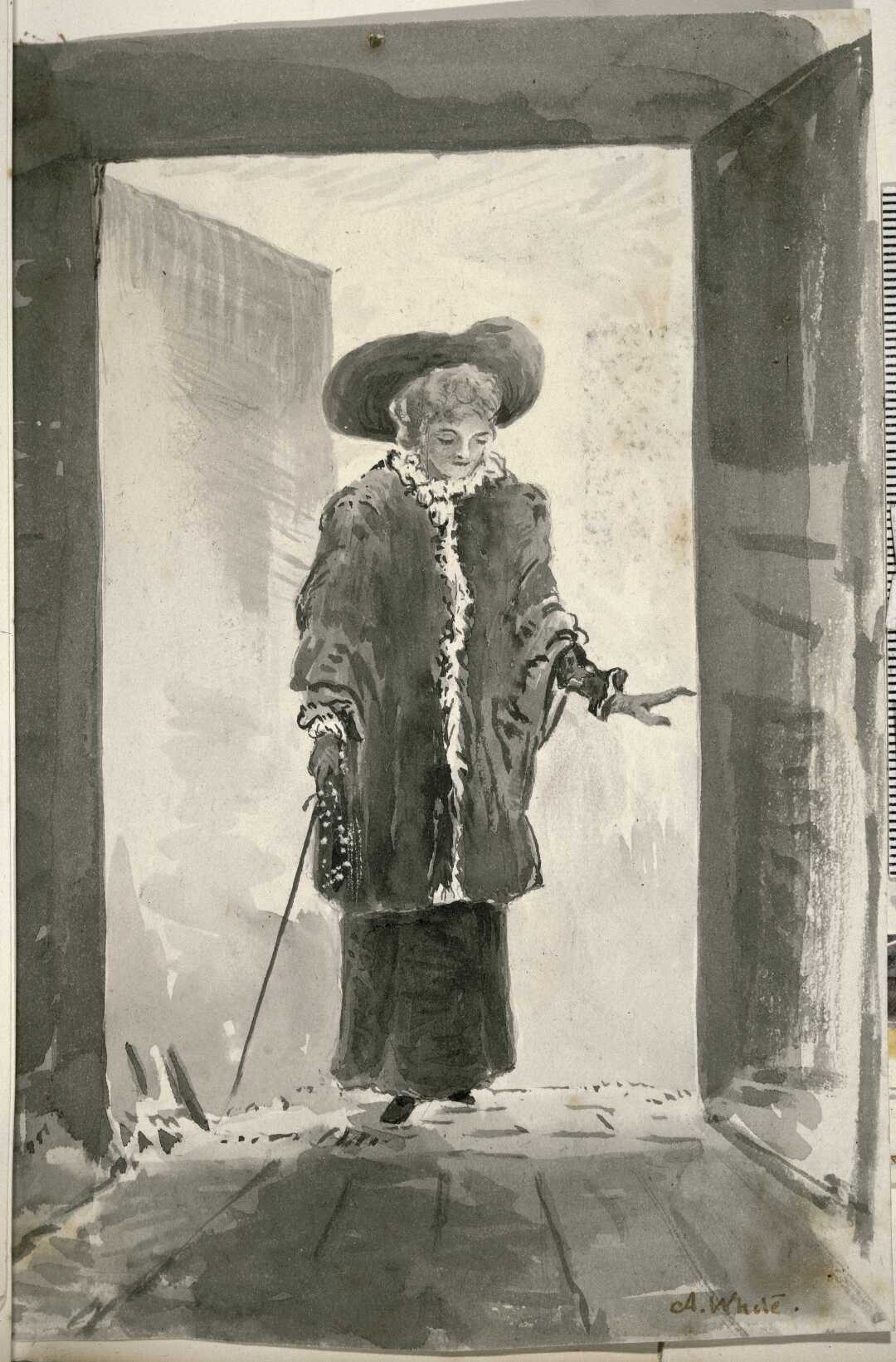
Woman in a Doorway, by White c. 1880

White studied art with W. M. Hodgkins. Her watercolour artworks were exhibited with the Otago Art Society from 1876 to 1894 and from 1902 to 1919. She sat on the council of the society from 1888 to 1894 and from 1902. She also exhibited at the 1889 New Zealand and South Seas International Exhibition. She spent time in Europe including two years living in Leipzig before World War I, where her daughter was studying music. Her sketchbooks form part of the Hocken Collections.

White died on 24 October 1932. At the time of her death she was described by the Otago Daily Times as "one of the oldest surviving settlers of the district".
