= Fitzgerald v Muldoon =

1976 New Zealand Supreme Court case

Fitzgerald v Muldoon and Others
- Court: Wellington Supreme Court
- Decided: 11 June 1976
- Citation: [1976] 2 NZLR 615

Court membership
- Judge sitting: Chief Justice Richard Wild

Keywords
- Bill of Rights 1688, separation of powers, Parliamentary supremacy, Constitutional law

Fitzgerald v Muldoon and Others is a 1976 New Zealand Supreme Court (Note: Until 1980, the Supreme Court of New Zealand was the name used for what is now the High Court of New Zealand.) case concerning whether press statements by Robert Muldoon had breached section 1 of the Bill of Rights 1688. In its decision, the court ruled "That the pretended power of suspending of laws, or the execution of laws, by regal authority, without consent of Parliament, is illegal". The case has since become one of New Zealand's most important constitutional law decisions.

== Background ==
The Third Labour Government had passed the New Zealand Superannuation Act 1974 requiring employees and employers to make matching compulsory contributions to a superannuation fund from 1 April 1975. This was to be administered by the Superannuation Board.

As David Williams noted, "The National Party, then in opposition, used all possible parliamentary devices to oppose this legislation and promised to repeal it immediately the Party gained office again. The general election campaign in 1975 had featured an acrimonious debate over the merits of the rival Labour and National superannuation policies." The National Party had suggested in its election campaign, and specifically in the Dancing Cossacks advertisement, that the superannuation scheme would have the effect of leading to Soviet-style communism.

A general election was held on 29 November 1975, at which the Labour Party was voted out of government and on 12 December 1975 the Third National Government was formed with Robert Muldoon sworn in as prime minister. On 15 December, the Prime Minister, who was also minister of finance, issued a press statement declaring,

The Prime Minister, Hon R D Muldoon, today issued a statement on the future of the New Zealand Superannuation scheme. This was to give effect to National's election policy to abolish the scheme and refund all contributions to employees.

Mr Muldoon said that early in the next Parliamentary session legislation would be introduced to carry out the government's election promises relating to the New Zealand Superannuation Scheme. In particular the compulsory element in the law would be removed with retrospective effect.

The compulsory requirement for employee deductions to the New Zealand scheme will cease for pay periods ending after this date. Mr Muldoon said that he recognised that because of arrangements made for payment of wages and salaries in advance through computer systems or by other means, deductions would in some cases continue for limited periods. All deductions and contributions, including any which may be made from now until 31 March 1976, will be returned to employees through the income tax refund system or could be transferred to another scheme.

Similarly the compulsory requirement for employer contributions will cease as from today in respect of salaries or wages paid from now on.

— Robert Muldoon, Press statement on 15 December 1975

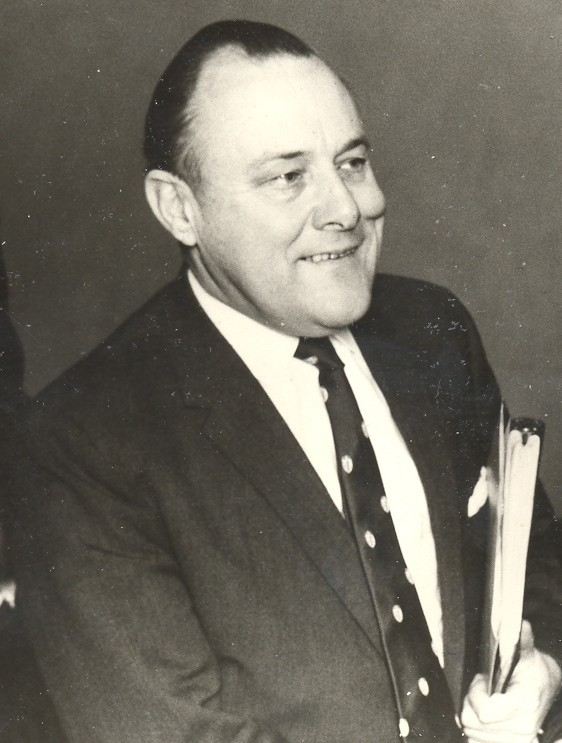
Robert Muldoon, pictured in 1969.

On 23 December, Prime Minister Muldoon issued another press release,

Regardless of what any union groups might represent or how some employers might see the position, no employees would receive the benefit of employer contributions made to the New Zealand Superannuation Fund after December 15, said the Prime Minister and Minister of Finance, Mr Muldoon, today. Mr Muldoon said the government had already made it clear that the superannuation scheme finished on December 15 and the compulsory requirement for employee deductions and employer contributions ceased for pay periods ending after that date. Empowering legislation, with retrospective effect, would be introduced early in the 1976 Parliamentary session.

— Robert Muldoon, Press statement on 23 December 1975

The plaintiff, FitzGerald, had worked as a public servant since 3 June 1975 and he stated in his affidavit that he had since the beginning of his employment with the Crown, contributed at a rate of one percent of his earnings, amounting to $2.08 a fortnight. He further deposed that the Crown had been deducting this from his gross earnings and transferring this into the fund along with their contribution, until the pay period ending on 24 December 1975.

FitzGerald sued the Prime Minister, as first defendant, and named the chairman and eight other members of the Superannuation Board as second defendant, the Attorney-General (in respect of the Treasury and Department of Education) as third defendant and the Controller and Auditor-General as fourth defendant.

Chief Justice Richard Wild summarised FitzGerald's case as being that the Prime Minister had, in contravention of the Bill of Rights 1688, section 1, made an announcement that constituted exercising a pretended power to suspend a properly made law, the Superannuation Act 1974. FitzGerald sought a declaration that the announcement and instructions issued by the Prime Minister on 15 December 1975 amounted to a breach of section 1 of the Bill of Rights 1688 and also injunctions requiring the withdrawal of the instruction and restraining the Prime Minister from further instructions to the Superannuation Board. A range of other declarations and injunctions was sought against the other defendants for their participation in the suspension of the superannuation scheme.

== Evidence ==
In his judgment Wild surveyed the evidence of four public officials: Sir Arnold Nordmeyer, Chairman of the Superannuation Board; a Mr Kelly, assistant commissioner of the State Services Commission; the chief accountant of the Inland Revenue Department; and the general manager of the Superannuation Corporation.

== Judgment ==
Wild decided in favour of the plaintiff on one issue, that the Prime Minister's purported suspension of the operation of the New Zealand Superannuation Act 1975, "was illegal as being in breach of s 1 of the Bill of Rights, and that the plaintiff is entitled to a declaration to that effect".

The first sentence of the third paragraph, however, and the fourth paragraph [of the 15 December statement], amount together to an unequivocal pronouncement that the compulsory requirement for employee deductions and employer contributions were to cease as stated. That was reiterated in unmistakable terms in the second paragraph of the statement made on 23 December. The Act of Parliament in force required that those deductions and contributions must be made, yet here was the Prime Minister announcing that they need not be made. I am bound to hold that in so doing he was purporting to suspend the law without consent of Parliament. Parliament had made the law. Therefore the law could be amended or suspended only by Parliament or with the authority of Parliament.

— Wild CJ, Fitzgerald v Muldoon and Others

Wild also held that whether the meaning of "by regal authority" included the Prime Minister's statement was

to be determined by reference to the powers of the Prime Minister and the position occupied by him, which are of fundamental importance in our system of government. He is the Prime Minister, the leader of the government elected to office, the chief of the executive government. He had lately received his commission by royal authority, taken the oaths of office, and entered on his duties. In my opinion his public announcement of 15 December, made as it was in the course of his official duties as Prime Minister, must therefore be regarded as made "by regal authority" within the meaning of s 1.

— Chief Justice Richard Wild, Fitzgerald v Muldoon and Others

Wild found against the plaintiff that the evidence disclosed that there had been no instructions by the Prime Minister to any members of the Superannuation Board, any government department or arm of state services.

Because there was a high probability that the New Zealand Superannuation Act 1974 would be repealed and the scheme dismantled in the months following the hearing, Wild adjourned all other matters for six months, satisfied that, "In my opinion, the law and the authority of Parliament will be vindicated by the making of the declaration I have indicated".
