= Kerry Gibson =

South African-New Zealand psychologist

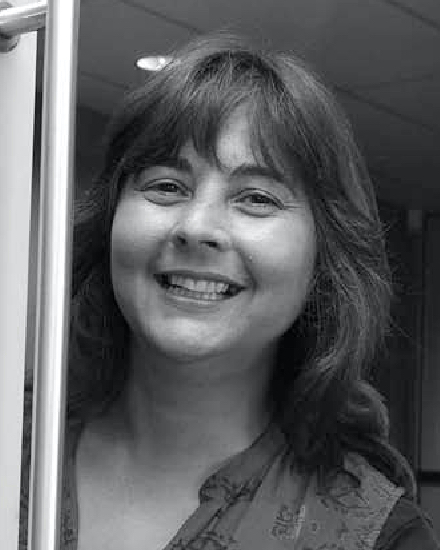
- Gibson in 2007
- Education: University of Cape Town
- Scientific career
- Fields: Youth mental health
- Workplaces: University of Cape Town, Massey University, University of Auckland
- Thesis: Politics and emotion in work with disadvantaged children: case studies in consultation from a South African clinic (2002)

Kerry Lynn Gibson is a South African-New Zealand clinical psychologist and academic, specialising in youth mental health. She is a professor in the School of Psychology at the University of Auckland. Gibson was the president of the New Zealand Psychological Society, from 2014 until 2016.

== Academic career ==
In the early 2000s, Gibson was the senior lecturer in psychology at the University of Cape Town. She co-authored several textbooks with South African psychologist Leslie Swartz applying psychodynamics to issues in organisational psychology. In the mid-2000s, Gibson was one of the academics commissioned to assess the psychological effects experienced by members of the Centrepoint Commune after its closure. Since 2007, Gibson has served as the director for the Massey University Auckland Campus Centre for Psychology. In 2010, Gibson co-authored a study with Claire Cartwright and John Read that investigated if long-term use of antidepressants was potentially addictive. Also in 2010, Gibson joined the psychology faculty of the University of Auckland.

In September 2021, Gibson published the book What Young People Want from Mental Health Services, focusing on challenges experienced by youth in their late teens and early 20s. This book is based on the Mirror Project, a qualitative study involving over 400 interviews of New Zealand youth.

== Selected works ==
- Gibson, Kerry (1989). "Children in political violence". Social Science & Medicine. 28 (7): 659–667. doi:10.1016/0277-9536(89)90213-X. PMID 2652322.
- Sennett, Justin; Finchilescu, Gillian; Gibson, Kerry; Strauss, Rosanna (2003). "Adjustment of black students at a historically white South African university". Educational Psychology. 23 (1): 107–116. doi:10.1080/01443410303219. S2CID 145559471.
- Rohleder, Poul; Gibson, Kerry (2006). "We are not fresh': HIV-positive women talk of their experience of living with their 'spoiled identity". South African Journal of Psychology. 36 (1): 25–44. doi:10.1177/008124630603600103. hdl:11427/19409. S2CID 144481766.
- Gibson, Kerry; Cartwright, Claire (2013). "Agency in young clients' narratives of counseling:"It's whatever you want to make of it"". Journal of Counseling Psychology. 60 (3): 340–352. doi:10.1037/a0033110. PMID 23875946.
- Read, John; Cartwright, Claire; Gibson, Kerry (2014). "Adverse emotional and interpersonal effects reported by 1829 New Zealanders while taking antidepressants". Psychiatry Research. 216 (1): 67–73. doi:10.1016/j.psychres.2014.01.042. PMID 24534123. S2CID 28586020.
- Gibson, Kerry; Cartwright, Claire (2014). "Young people's experiences of mobile phone text counselling: Balancing connection and control". Children and Youth Services Review. 43: 96–104. doi:10.1016/j.childyouth.2014.05.010.
- Cartwright, Claire; Gibson, Kerry; Read, John; Cowan, Ondria; Dehar, Tamsin (2016). "Long-term antidepressant use: patient perspectives of benefits and adverse effects". Patient Preference and Adherence. 10: 1401–1407. doi:10.2147/PPA.S110632. PMC 4970636. PMID 27528803.
- Gibson, Kerry; Cartwright, Claire; Kerrisk, Kelly; Campbell, Julia; Seymour, Fred (2016). "What young people want: a qualitative study of adolescents' priorities for engagement across psychological services". Journal of Child and Family Studies. 25 (4): 1057–1065. doi:10.1007/s10826-015-0292-6. S2CID 143104764.
- Gibson, Kerry; Wilson, Jan; Grice, Jade Le; Seymour, Fred (2019). "Resisting the silence: The impact of digital communication on young people's talk about suicide". Youth & Society. 51 (8): 1011–1030. doi:10.1177/0044118X17720986. S2CID 148719793.
- Gibson, Kerry (2020). "Bridging the digital divide: Reflections on using WhatsApp instant messenger interviews in youth research". Qualitative Research in Psychology. 19 (3): 611–631. doi:10.1080/14780887.2020.1751902. S2CID 218777004.

== Bibliography ==
- Gibson, Kerry; Swartz, Leslie; Sandenbergh, Rob (2002). Counselling and Coping. Oxford University Press. ISBN 978-0195718683.
- Swartz, Leslie; Gibson, Kerry; Gelman, Tamara (2002). Reflective practice: Psychodynamic ideas in the community. Human Sciences Research Council. ISBN 978-0796919960.
- Gibson, Kerry; Swartz, Leslie (2004). Community psychology: Emotional processes in political subjects. UCT Press. ISBN 978-1919713885.
- Williams, Steve; Clarke, Dave; Gibson, Kerry (2011). The Use of Touch in Counselling and Psychotherapy: A Thematic Analysis. Lambert Academic Publishing. ISBN 978-3844304282.
- Gibson, Kerry (2021). What Young People Want from Mental Health Services. Routledge. ISBN 978-1000461466.
