= Shirley Smith (lawyer) =

New Zealand lawyer (1916–2007)

Shirley Hilda Stanley Smith
- Born: 10 October 1916
- Died: 29 December 2007 (aged 91)
- Occupation: Lawyer
- Years active: 1957–1994
- Spouse: Bill Sutch
- Father: David Smith

Shirley Hilda Stanley Smith (10 October 1916 – 29 December 2007) was a lawyer from New Zealand.

== Background ==
Smith was born in 1916 in Wellington, New Zealand, and was the daughter of barrister and judge Sir David Smith. She attended Queen Margaret College and Nga Tawa Diocesan School.

On 2 June 1944, Smith married William Ball Sutch. Together they had one daughter.

== Career ==
Smith's interest in the law began through conversations with her father, David Smith, although he did not initially approve of her pursuing a legal career. Instead, she studied Classics at the University of Oxford and then returned to New Zealand to teach. After attending a lecture in New York on the Commission on the Status of Women, she was inspired to train as a lawyer. After returning to New Zealand in 1951, she enrolled in Victoria University of Wellington's Faculty of Law.

While undertaking her legal training, Smith was one of around five women in the law school and she challenged the policies of the New Zealand Law Society and Wellington District Law Society that disallowed women from attending their dinners.

After graduating in 1957, Smith became the 41st woman to be admitted as a barrister and solicitor of the High Court of New Zealand. She first worked as a law clerk at Wellington firm before deciding to enter academia.

In 1957, Smith joined the Victoria University of Wellington and became the first woman in New Zealand to lecture in law and be a full member of a law faculty. She lectured for two years and taught constitutional Law and Roman law. During this time she was the only female faculty member. She was also the first editor of the Victoria University of Wellington Law Review.

Smith left the university to practice general law as a sole practitioner. Between 1961 and 1994 she worked in Wellington as a barrister and solicitor. Although her cases were varied she became known for her work in family law and criminal law. She was drawn to cases of relating to social justice and did pro bono work for a number of organisations, including the Cook Island Society of New Zealand (Wellington) and the Society for Research on Women. She also represented a number of gang members in criminal cases, including members of the Porirua chapter of the Mongrel Mob and Wellington chapter of the Black Power Gang.

In the early 1990s, Smith stopped practising law. In 1995 she was made an honorary life member of the Wellington District Law Society.

== Shirley Smith Address ==
In honour of Shirley Smith, the Women in Law Committee of the New Zealand Law Society's Wellington branch began the annual Shirley Smith Address. The event began in 2008 and occurs annually. Previous speakers have included:

Year	Speaker	Address title
2008	Margaret Wilson	Inaugural Address
2009	Dame Sian Elias	Blameless Babes
2010	Professor Nicola Lacey	The Prisoners' Dilemma and Political Systems: The Impact of Proportional Representation on Criminal Justice in New Zealand
2011	Sir Kenneth Keith	Human Rights and National Security in International Law and National Law
2012	Professor Hilary Charlesworth	Keeping Women in their Place – Women's rights and the question of ‘culture' in international law
2013	Justice Teresa Doherty	Sexual violence and the role of the International Courts
2014	Dame Susan Glazebrook	Protecting the Vulnerable in the 21st Century: An International Perspective
2015	Dame Silvia Cartwright	Gender-based violence – the price is not right
2016	Ngaire Naffine	Criminal Law and the Problem of Men, or Manliness, Male Right and Criminal law
2017	Jacinta Ruru	First Laws: Tikanga Māori in / and the Law
2018	Gillian Triggs	The Movement of People and Asylum Seekers in the Asia Pacific: A Rule of Law Approach
2019	Vanessa Munro	Judging Juries: The 'Common Sense' Conundrums of Prosecuting Violence Against Women
