= Richard Wild (judge) =

New Zealand jurist (1912–1978)

The Right Honourable Sir Richard Wild GBE KCMG QC

9th Chief Justice of New Zealand
- In office 18 January 1966 – 20 January 1978
- Nominated by: Keith Holyoake
- Appointed by: Sir Bernard Fergusson
- Preceded by: Harold Barrowclough
- Succeeded by: Ronald Davison

Personal details
- Born: Herbert Richard Churton Wild; 20 September 1912 Blenheim, New Zealand
- Died: 22 May 1978 (aged 65) Wellington, New Zealand
- Relatives: Leonard Wild (father); John Wild (son); John White (brother-in-law); Douglas White (nephew)

Sir Herbert Richard Churton Wild GBE KCMG QC (20 September 1912 – 22 May 1978) was the ninth Chief Justice of New Zealand.

== Family ==
Wild was born in Blenheim in 1912. His father, Leonard Wild, was at that time science teacher at Marlborough High School. He attended Feilding Agricultural High School. His sister Dora later married the jurist John White. His son, John Wild, was a judge at the High Court and then the Court of Appeal.

== Chief justice ==
He famously decided the case of Fitzgerald v Muldoon in 1976.

Wild was diagnosed with a brain tumour in 1977. He resigned as Chief Justice in early 1978 and died shortly after.

Legal offices
Preceded by Harold Barrowclough	Chief Justice of New Zealand; 1966–1978	Succeeded by Ronald Davison
