= Allan Holmes (lawyer) =

New Zealand cricketer (1845–1909)

Personal information
- Born: 25 January 1845; Geelong, Colony of New South Wales, Australia
- Died: 9 April 1909 (aged 64); Dunedin, Otago, New Zealand

Domestic team information
- Years: Team
- 1870/71–1873/74: Otago
- Source: CricketArchive, 28 February 2024

Allan Holmes (25 January 1845 – 9 April 1909) was an Australian-born New Zealand cricketer who played for Otago. He was a barrister at the Supreme Court.

Holmes was born in Geelong in 1845, the son of politician Mathew Holmes and brother of Katherine McLean Holmes and Annie Julia White, who both became artists. His mother was in poor health and the family moved to Scotland in 1854 to have better access to health care. They lived on a large estate in Lasswade. He received his education at the University of Edinburgh and The Queen's College, Oxford; he graduated from Oxford in 1866. He was admitted to the Middle Temple as a barrister in 1870. With his family having moved to Otago in New Zealand in 1864, he emigrated to Dunedin and was admitted to the Supreme Court soon after he arrived.

Holmes made two first-class appearances for the team, the first during the 1870–71 season, and the second three seasons later. On his debut, against Canterbury, he scored 12 runs in both innings in which he batted, though Otago would lose the match by an innings margin. In the second and final match in which he played, Holmes scored a duck, though Otago won the match by an innings margin, restricting Canterbury to just 38 runs in their second innings.

In 1874, he took a position as a law lecturer at the University of Otago. In the mid-1870s, he joined the law firm of William Downie Stewart shortly after John Denniston had joined, and the firm was then known as Stewart, Holmes and Denniston, and acquired an extensive practice in Otago. Early in 1881, Holmes and Thomas S. Weston of Christchurch were appointed as examiners of candidates for admission to the New Zealand bar; they were the first to be appointed to this position.

On 13 August 1873, he married Lillie McLean Waldie, the fourth daughter of Thomas Waldie, at Wyndholm near Ballarat in Victoria, Australia. They had a son, Henry Herbert Holmes, who was born on 1 July 1874 in Dunedin, and died on 24 December 1903 in Masterton, aged 29. A daughter, Lillie Catherine Mary Holmes, was born on 17 September 1877 in Dunedin. Allan Holmes died at his home in the Dunedin suburb of Roslyn. His daughter died in 1933 with a married name Campbell, and his wife died in 1937. All four are buried in the same plot at Dunedin Northern Cemetery.
