= 1982 New Year Honours (New Zealand) =

Awards list for New Zealand

The 1982 New Year Honours in New Zealand were appointments by Elizabeth II on the advice of the New Zealand government to various orders and honours to reward and highlight good works by New Zealanders. The awards celebrated the passing of 1981 and the beginning of 1982, and were announced on 31 December 1981.

The recipients of honours are displayed here as they were styled before their new honour.

== Knight Bachelor ==
- Lloyd Elsmore OBE JP – of Auckland; mayor of Manukau.
- Russell Matthews OBE – of New Plymouth. For services to horticulture and the community.
- The Honourable John Charles White MBE – of Wellington; lately a judge of the High Court of New Zealand.
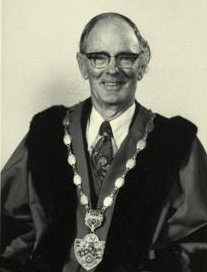
Sir Lloyd Elsmore

== Order of the Bath ==
=== Companion (CB) ===
Military division

- Rear Admiral Keith Michael Saull – Chief of Naval Staff.

== Order of Saint Michael and Saint George ==
=== Companion (CMG) ===
- Jack Alexander McLeod Kean – of Wellington; lately Comptroller of Customs.
- Douglas Callum Kirkpatrick JP – of Havelock North. For services as chairman of the Forestry Council and to business management.
- Robert William Stannard – of Wellington. For services to the accountancy profession.

== Order of the British Empire ==
=== Knight Commander (KBE) ===
Civil division

- Henare Kohere Ngata OBE JP – of Gisborne. For services to the Māori people.
- Allan Frederick Wright – of Sheffield; president, Federated Farmers of New Zealand, 1977–1981.
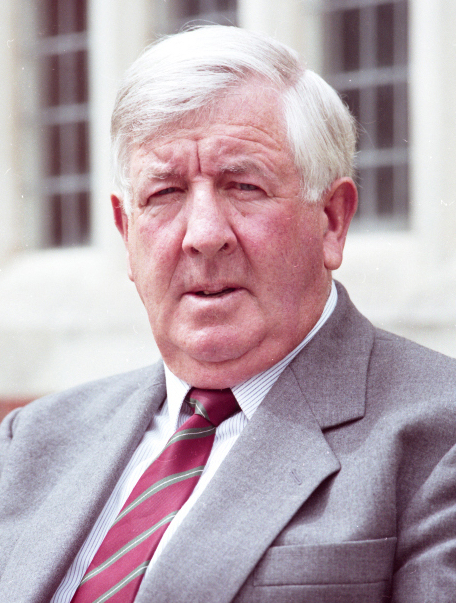
Sir Allan Wright

=== Commander (CBE) ===
Civil division

- Reubina Ann Ballin – of Christchurch. For services to the disabled.
- Dr Alfred Bramwell Cook – of Christchurch. For services to the Salvation Army and the community.
- William Henry Hickson – of Tawa; lately director-general, New Zealand Post Office.
- Professor Ewen Garth McQueen VRD – of Dunedin. For services to pharmacology.
- Walter Stewart Otto – of Auckland. For public services.
- David Alan Thom – of Auckland. For services to engineering and the environment.

Military division

- Brigadier Harry Bowen Honnor MVO – Deputy Chief of Defence Staff.

=== Officer (OBE) ===
Civil division

- Donald Frederick Cotter – of Auckland. For services to the Anglican Church and community.
- Brian Ross Davies – chief superintendent, New Zealand Police.
- Keith Henry Dockery – of Napier. For services to local government.
- James Healy – of Rotorua. For services to geology and the community.
- Eugen Hirst JP – of Auckland. For services to optometry and the community.
- Ernest Albert James Holdaway DFC JP – of Auckland. For services to local and community affairs.
- Albert Archibald Jelley – of Auckland. For services to athletics.
- John Keith Macdonald – of Christchurch. For services to sport.
- Patrick Eisdell Moore – of Auckland. For services to otolaryngology and the community.
- Jack Drysdale Prestney – of Upper Hutt. For services to sport.
- Harold James Stinson – of Dunedin. For services to returned servicemen.
- Emeritus Professor Richard Horton Beauclerc Toy – of Auckland. For services to architecture.
- William Henry Walden-Mills – of Wellington. For services to music education.
- George Raymond Webby – of Wellington. For services to drama and the theatre.

Military division

- Chaplain Paul Cronin – Royal New Zealand Navy.
- Lieutenant Colonel Clyde Cyril Stewart – Royal New Zealand Artillery.
- Group Captain Frederick Martin Kinvig AFC – Royal New Zealand Air Force.
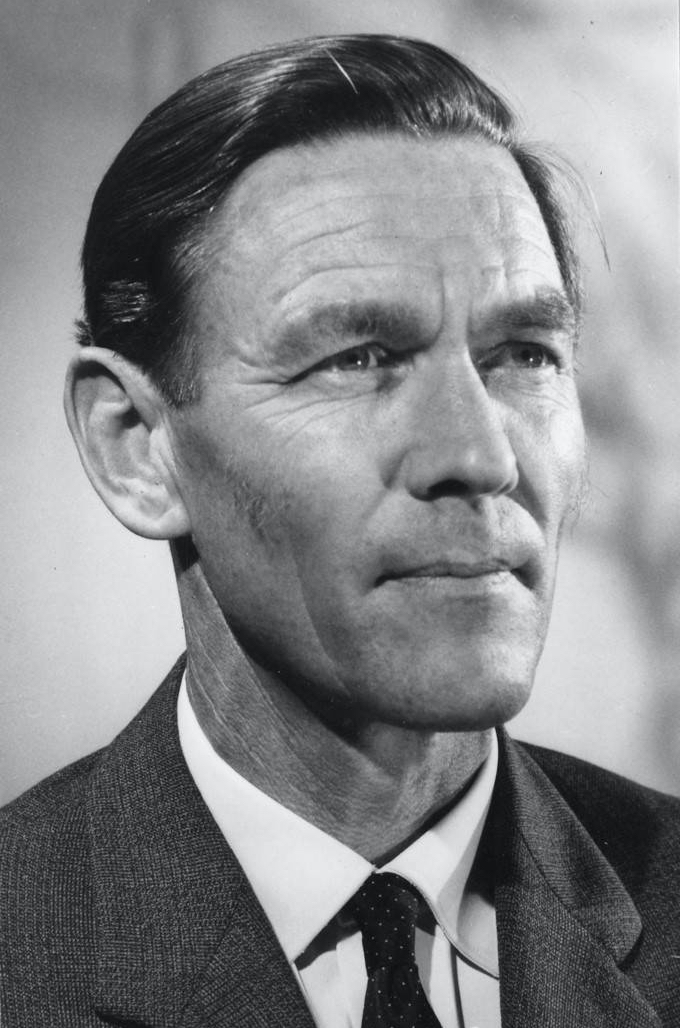
Jim Holdaway

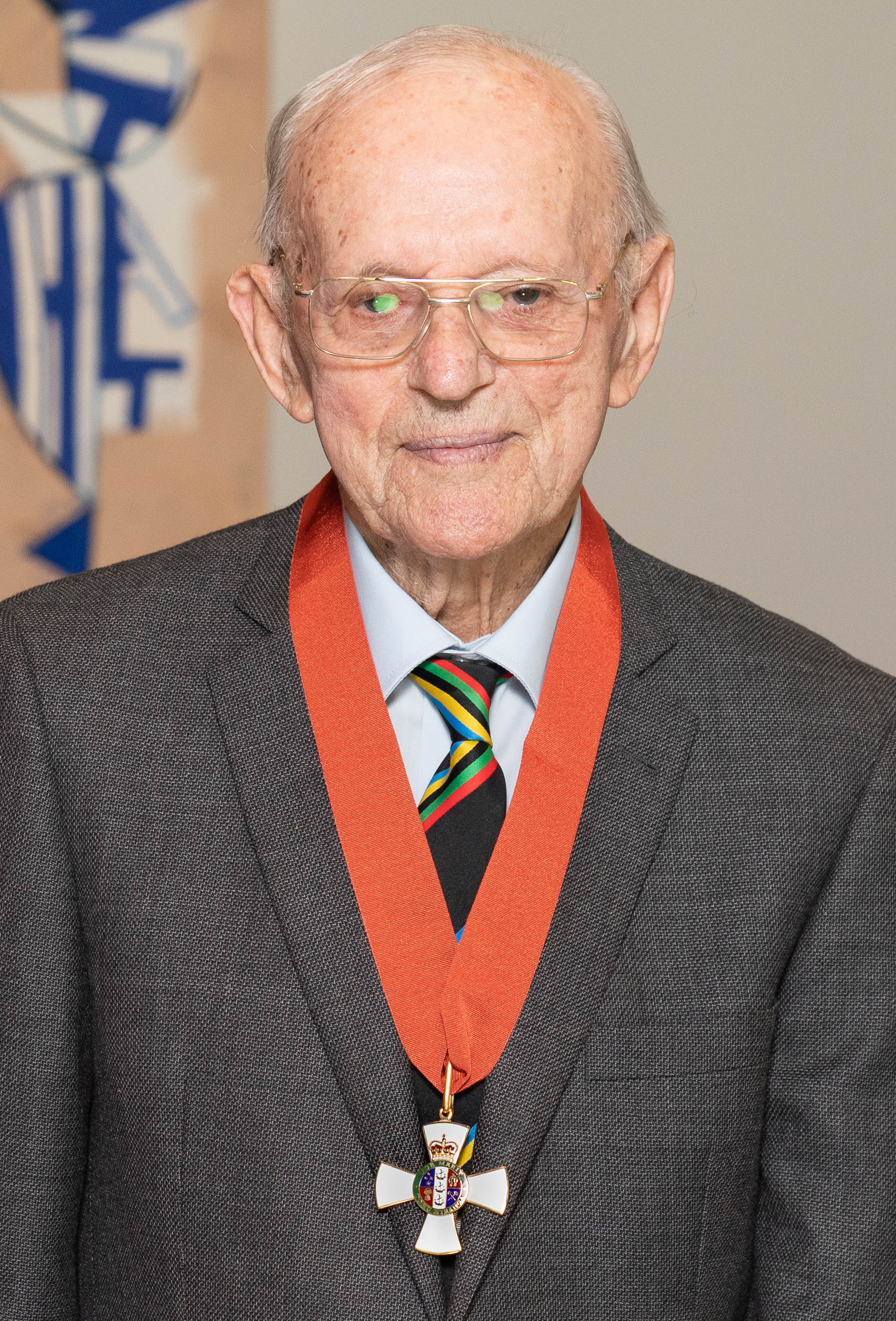
Arch Jelley

=== Member (MBE) ===
Civil division

- David Douglas Alderton – of Queenstown. For services to farming and the community.
- Annie Shirley Barrett – of Auckland. For services to the Auckland Hospital Board and the community.
- Graham Neill Caldwell ED – of Auckland. For services to education and the community.
- Florence May Carruthers – of Milton. For services to women's hockey.
- Ernest Albert Edward Cook – of Ōkaihau. For services to the community.
- Ian Albert Dowdle – of Waitara. For services to the dairy industry.
- William Harkness Dunn – of Auckland. For services to aviation.
- The Reverend Leo Reginald Evatt SM – of Silverstream. For services to education.
- Margaret Jane Catherine Fox (Sister Mary Ceslaus) – of Invercargill. For services to music.
- Jack Henry Harvey – of Lower Hutt. For services to the intellectually handicapped.
- Norman Frederick Hubbard – of Wanganui. For services to the community.
- John James Jarvis – of Dunedin. For services to scouting.
- April Vye Kerr – of Timaru. For services to the Country Women's Institute and the community.
- Maurice Arthur Le Cren – of Christchurch. For services to bowling.
- Thomas William Henry Lighton – of Gisborne. For services to brass bands.
- Barbara Flora McDonald – of Napier. For services to the New Zealand Red Cross Society and the community.
- Joseph George Pereira – of Wellington; chef de cuisine (Bellamy's), Tourist Hotel Corporation of New Zealand.
- Ralph Strang Rollo – of Richmond. For services to the community.
- Evelyn Beatrice Salmon – of Raumati Beach; senior lecturer, Nursing Studies, Department of Education, Victoria University of Wellington.
- Marie Joyce Samuels – of Blenheim. For services to the community.
- Dr Jean Anderson Seabrook – of Christchurch. For services to speech therapy.
- Lewis Arthur Turrell – of Invercargill. For services to Highland pipe bands.
- Samuel Malcolm Wallace JP – of Nelson Creek, Westland. For services to farming.
- Vera Isabel Williamson – of Feilding; lieutenant colonel, Salvation Army. For services in India, 1945–1980.
- Peter Tom Wolfenden – of Auckland. For services to trotting.

Military division

- Lieutenant Commander Geoffrey John Bourke – Royal New Zealand Navy.
- Warrant Officer Control Electrical Artificer Geoffrey Stevenson Kelly – Royal New Zealand Navy.
- Warrant Officer Class II Geoffrey John Blackburn – Corps of Royal New Zealand Engineers.
- Warrant Officer Class I Kenneth John Carleton – Royal New Zealand Dental Corps (Territorial Force).
- Warrant Officer Class I Rex William Harris – Royal New Zealand Infantry Regiment.
- Flight Lieutenant Norman Henry Bartholomew BEM – Royal New Zealand Air Force.
- Squadron Leader Brian Glenbourne Morrison Palmer – Royal New Zealand Air Force.
- Squadron Leader Clyde McGregor Simpson DFC – Territorial Air Force.

== British Empire Medal (BEM) ==
Military division

- General Service Hand James Cuthbertson – Royal New Zealand Navy.
- Chief Petty Officer Radio Supervisor Christopher Robin Farrow – Royal New Zealand Navy.
- Sergeant Harvey Wilson Murray – Royal New Zealand Armoured Corps.
- Staff Sergeant Benjamin Ngapo – Royal New Zealand Infantry Regiment.
- Flight Sergeant Allan Barry Hill – Royal New Zealand Air Force.
- Sergeant Desmond Peter McGettigan – Royal New Zealand Air Force.
- Sergeant Rangi Haereroa Temore Mark Ngaropo Takuira – Royal New Zealand Air Force.

== Companion of the Queen's Service Order (QSO) ==
=== For community service ===
- Morris Leonard Coutts – of Christchurch.
- Owen George Davis – of Invercargill.
- Kathleen Gabrielle Gibbs (Sister Mary Crescentia) – of Greenmeadows.
- Ruby Jones JP – of Karoro.
- Thomas Clive Smith JP – of Whakatāne.

=== For public services ===
- Edgar Stanley James Crutchley JP – of Lower Hutt.
- Kenneth Clarence Durrant – of Upper Hutt; deputy director-general of Agriculture and Fisheries.
- Albert Eric Gibson – of Rotorua; lately superintendent of land development, Department of Lands and Survey.
- Charles Russell Hervey – of Timaru.
- Noel Cameron Kelly JP – of Upper Hutt; lately Public Trustee.
- Mabel Mahinarangi Kewene MBE JP – of Auckland; lately principal nurse, Waiapu Hospital Board.
- Cyril Ashton Lovell – of Whangārei.
- Nita Marie McMaster – of Wellington; lately principal, Wellington East Girls' College.
- Robert Howard White JP – of Papatoetoe; mayor of Papatoetoe.
- Terence Leslie Carlton Williams JP – of Gisborne.
- Dong Willie Lee Young JP – of Papatoetoe.

== Queen's Service Medal (QSM) ==
=== For community service ===
- Ngapera Taahu Black – of Whakatāne.
- Gwendolene Annie Blott – of Auckland.
- Frederick Robert Brown – of Temuka.
- Jean Winifred Brown – of Auckland.
- Alexander Loyal Caie – of Pōkeno.
- Shirley Joan Coates – of Hamilton.
- Jean Elizabeth Donnelly – of Te Kuiti.
- Cyril Terence Drummond – of Motueka.
- Alan Herbert Haskell – of Auckland.
- Lorna Beryl Hendry – of Auckland.
- Royden James Howell – of Palmerston North.
- Ivan Charles Edwin Lovelock – of Hamilton.
- Edith Mary McRoberts Luker – of Auckland.
- Marie Mahoney – of Invercargill.
- Myrtle Kathleen Old – of Putāruru.
- Eileen Maud Kimbell-Owen – of Auckland.
- Lucilla Mary Katherine Quin – of Rotorua.
- Eileen May Reed – of Whangārei.
- Florence Hilda Robertson – of Auckland.
- Eunice Myrtle Robinson – of Auckland.
- Toni Joan Savage – of Auckland.
- Lily Allan Stevens – of Dunedin.
- Te Wairakau Paia Waipara – of Gisborne.
- Claire Wallis – of Cambridge.
- Elvy Florence Wills – of Christchurch.
- Barry Graham Wynks – of Palmerston North.

=== For public services ===
- Ruby Alice Aberhart – of Upper Moutere.
- Albert George Braddick JP – of Fairlie.
- Maisie Constance Brown – of Stratford.
- Rita Cartwright – of Invercargill.
- Oliver John Chappell – of Auckland.
- Ian John Crawford JP – of Pātea.
- Harold Robert Crossman – of Christchurch.
- Howard Wilberforce Duncumb JP – of Auckland.
- Bo Benn (Margaret) Easther – of Wellington.
- Teea-atua Sarah Goodwin JP – of Auckland.
- John Gow Irving – of Timaru; supervising livestock officer, Ministry of Agriculture and Fisheries.
- Muriel Jean Lilburn – of Hunterville.
- Peter Samuel McCormack – of Franz Josef Glacier.
- Valerie Elizabeth Maxted Miller JP – of Christchurch.
- Norman Alfred Morris – of Middlesex, England; lately New Zealand High Commission, London.
- Grace Pehunga Nicholls – of Upper Hutt.
- Ada Mabel Gwen Parnwell – of Tauranga.
- The Reverend Ned Eric Ripley – of Auckland.
- Sydney Maxwell John Smith – of Twizel; project engineer, Ministry of Works and Development, Twizel.
- Nancy Nicolas Strang – of Balclutha.
- Thomas Ross Vallentine – of Sydney, New South Wales, Australia; lately accountant and administration officer, New Zealand Consulate-General, Sydney.
- Keitha Margaret Weir – of Auckland.
- Janet Buchanan Williams – of London, England; lately social secretary, New Zealand High Commission, London.
- Isabel Elizabeth Young JP – of Timaru.
- Terence Noel French – senior sergeant, New Zealand Police.
- Patariki Paani Wihongi – sergeant, New Zealand Police.

== Royal Red Cross ==
=== Associate (ARRC) ===
- Warrant Officer Class II Raymond Roy Alexander – Royal New Zealand Medical Corps (Territorial Force).

== Air Force Cross (AFC) ==
- Squadron Leader Francis Stanton Sharp – Royal New Zealand Air Force.

== Queen's Fire Services Medal (QFSM) ==
- Noel Walter Thompson – chief fire officer, Paeroa Volunteer Fire Brigade, New Zealand Fire Service.
- Alan Fitzgerald Jones – chief fire officer, Pahiatua Volunteer Fire Brigade, New Zealand Fire Service.
- James Oman Rutene – chief fire officer, Te Karaka Volunteer Fire Brigade, New Zealand Fire Service.

== Queen's Police Medal (QPM) ==
- John Reginald Harman – superintendent, New Zealand Police.
- Brion Philip Duncan – detective chief inspector, New Zealand Police.

== Queen's Commendation for Valuable Service in the Air ==
- Lieutenant Michael John Millar – Royal New Zealand Navy.
- Squadron Leader Richard Merrill Bulger – Royal New Zealand Air Force.
- Squadron Leader Stewart David White – Royal New Zealand Air Force.
