= Katherine McLean Holmes =

New Zealand painter (1849–1925)

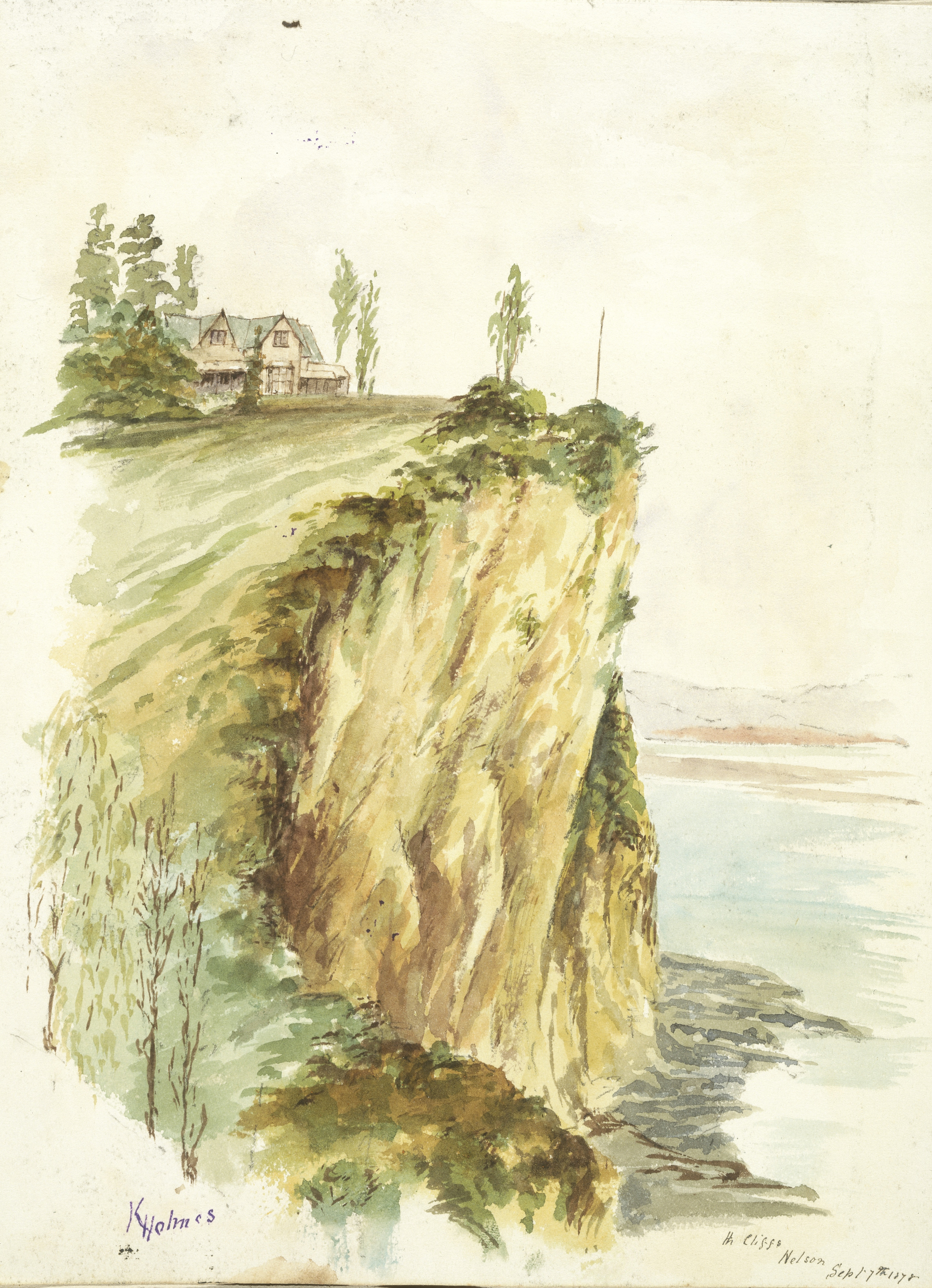
The Cliffs, Nelson, painted by Holmes in 1878

Katherine McLean Holmes (1849 – 16 January 1925) was a New Zealand painter whose work is held in the permanent collection of the National Library of New Zealand.

== Early life ==
Holmes was born in Geelong, Australia, the third daughter of New Zealander Matthew Holmes of Otago. Her sister Annie Julia White was also an artist, and her brother Allan Holmes was a cricketer and lawyer.

== Career ==
She exhibited at the New Zealand Academy of Fine Arts every year from 1883 to 1908. She worked with W. M. Hodgkins and exhibited with the Otago Art Society from 1878 and served on its council during 1886–87.

She moved to Hawkestone Street in Wellington in 1892 where she socialised with Rudyard Kipling, and the Duke and Duchess of York.

In 1893, she organised a bazaar in order to raise $100 to fund structural repairs to the New Zealand National Art Gallery and Dominion Museum.

=== Legacy ===
The collection of her paintings at the National Library of New Zealand comprises individual and group portraits. Her painting of a timber mill featured in the 2021 book The People and The Land.

== Death ==
She died in Wellington on 16 January 1925 aged 76.

On her death in 1925, she left a painting of the Henry VII Chapel by Gertrude Keeling to Dunedin Public Art Gallery.
