= Matthew Holmes (politician) =

New Zealand Legislative Council member

The Honourable Matthew Holmes
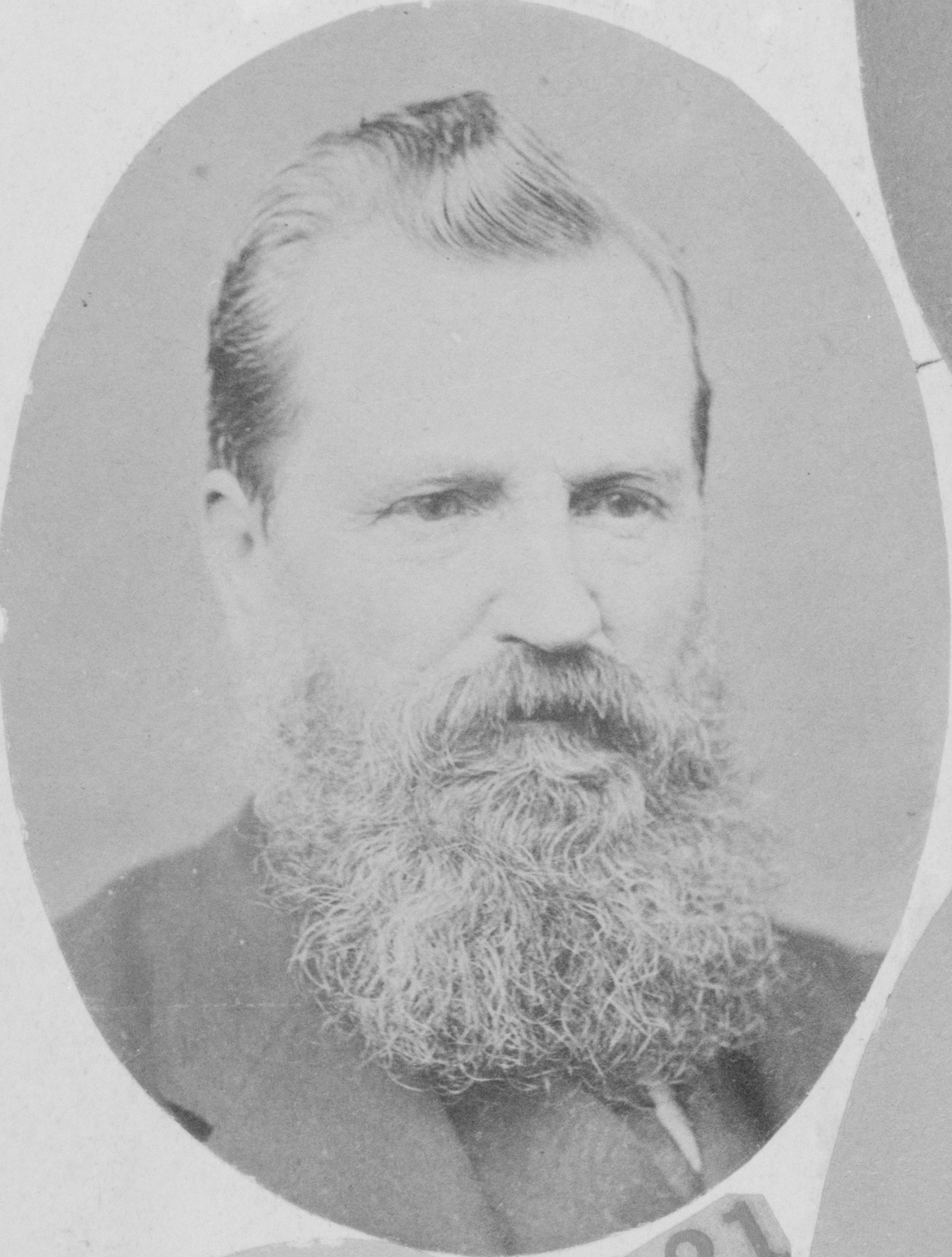
- Holmes in 1872

Member of the New Zealand Legislative Council
- In office 19 June 1866 – 27 September 1901

Personal details
- Born: 15 September 1817 Strabane, County Tyrone, Ireland
- Died: 27 September 1901 (aged 84) Wellington, New Zealand
- Resting place: Karori Cemetery
- Spouse: Anne McLean (m. 1841; died 1897)
- Children: 6
- Relatives: Allan Holmes (son); Katherine McLean Holmes (daughter); Annie Julia White (daughter); George McLean (son-in-law); Charles White (grandson); John White (great-grandson); Douglas White (great-great-grandson)

Matthew Holmes (15 September 1817 – 27 September 1901) was a New Zealand politician and runholder. He was a member of the New Zealand Legislative Council for 35 years (1866–1901). Holmes was from Ireland and made his money in Victoria from farming, exporting wool, and supplying the gold fields. The family lived in Scotland for some years but Holmes moved to New Zealand. His family followed him years later and they lived for most of their time in Otago, but retired to Wellington.

== Early life ==
Born in Strabane, County Tyrone, Ireland on 15 September 1817, Holmes received his education in his home town. After school, he was trained in commerce at McFarland's woollen mill in Derry.

== Life in Australia ==
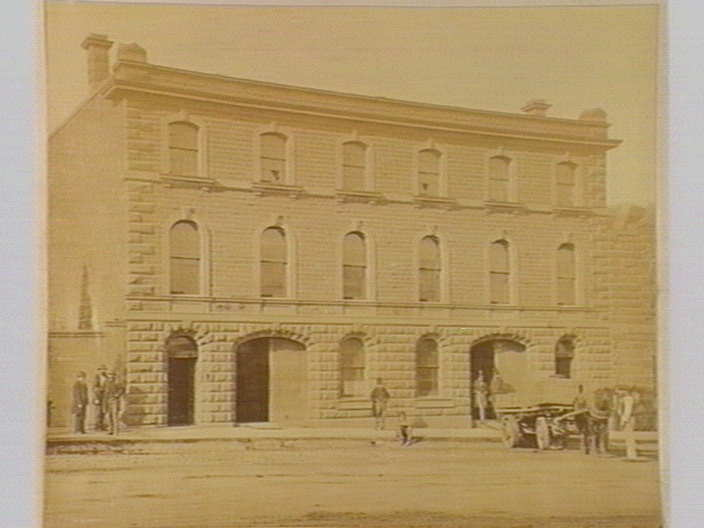
Premises of Holmes White & Co, William Street, Melbourne

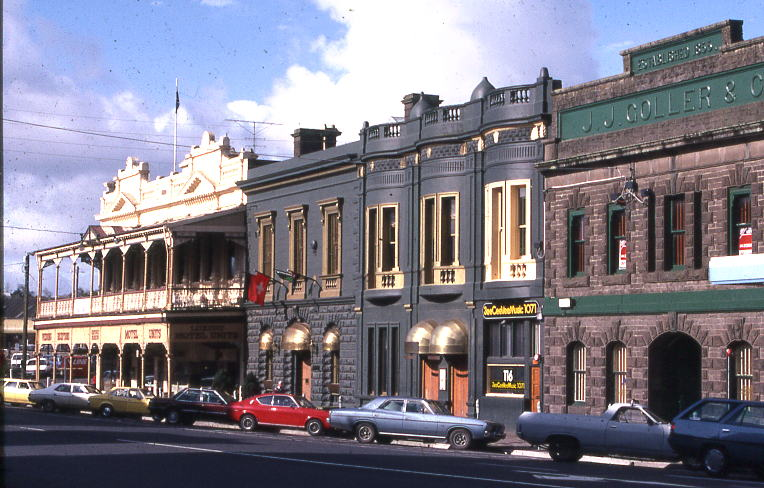
The rightmost building was constructed in 1862 for Holmes White & Co in Lydiard Street, Ballarat.

Holmes moved to Australia in 1837 and his first business venture was a stationery shop in Melbourne's Collins Street with William Kerr. The partnership was dissolved at the end of 1841; his business partner would later found The Argus. Holmes took over the running of the stationery shop by himself. In 1843, he was declared insolvent by the courts and the stock was auctioned. It was not until 1845 that he was discharged. For some time, he had a dairy farm called "Glencairn" in the Barrabool Hills outside of Geelong.

On 26 May 1841 at Port Phillip, he married Anne McLean, the daughter of Allan McLean of Strathallan near Echuca. After being burned out in the Black Thursday bushfires on 6 February 1851 and their youngest child dying from the effects, he relocated to Geelong and built up a profitable wool exporting company operating under the style of Holmes, White & Co.

He also supplied the gold diggings during the Victorian gold rush. The store of Holmes, White & Co in Melbourne's William Street does not exist any longer, but their premises at 114 Lydiard Street North in Ballarat still stand and are listed on the Victorian Heritage Register.

== Life in Scotland ==
Holmes and his family moved to Scotland in 1854 as there was better medical care available for his wife's poor health. He purchased a large estate in Lasswade near Edinburgh, and became involved in a group which became the New Zealand and Australia Land Company.

== Life in New Zealand ==
In 1859, he returned to New Zealand on the Pirate as the company's general manager, but also spent time in Victoria to look after business interests there. In 1862, he travelled to England as one of the commissioners for the 1862 International Exhibition. In 1864, he sold his estate in Scotland and moved his family back to New Zealand. At first, they were living at Andersons Bay on Otago Peninsula. They then lived partly at Andersons Bay and partly at Awamoa, near Oamaru in North Otago. He was the owner of large sheep runs both at Awamoa and at Castlerock near Lumsden in Southland. His station at Castlerock was overrun by rabbits in the 1870s, but Holmes managed to get on top of the problem; his son Stuart later gave presentations on how they went about this. Holmes was well known for importing quality stock for breeding, including Clydesdale horses and Cheviot sheep. Holmes was one of the original directors of the Mosgiel Woollen Mill and on retirement from active business, he sold his trading interests to Dalgety, Rattray & Co. In their later years, the Holmes lived in Hawkestone House, Wellington.

=== Political career ===
Holmes represented the Oteramika electorate in the Southland Provincial Council from 7 November 1864 to 6 July 1867. He represented the Oreti electorate in Southland on the Otago Provincial Council, after Otago and Southland had reunited, from 31 March 1871 to 22 May 1873.

Holmes was a member of the New Zealand Legislative Council from 19 June 1866 until 1901, when he died.

== Family and death ==
His wife was a half-sister to the brothers John and Allan McLean. The Holmes had six children, including the barrister Allan Holmes. Their third daughter Katherine was an artist whose work has been collected by the Hocken Library and the Alexander Turnbull Library. Their youngest daughter Annie Julia was also an artist, known for her watercolour painting. Another daughter was Isabella, a founder of Dunedin Public Art Gallery. Isabella married George McLean, who served as a member of parliament in the 1860s and 1870s, and became a member of the Legislative Council in 1881. A daughter of Isabella and George McLean married Thomas Wilford. The eldest daughter of the Holmes, Elizabeth, married in Melbourne in 1860. His wife died in 1897, and Holmes died on 27 September 1901 aged 84. He was buried at Karori Cemetery.
