= New Zealand Psychological Society =

New Zealand society and professional body for psychologists

- Formation: 1947
- Type: Professional association
- Headquarters: 90 The Terrace; Wellington, New Zealand
- Region served: New Zealand
- Field: Psychology
- Members: 2,000 (2022)
- President: Tania Anstiss
- Website: www.psychology.org.nz

The New Zealand Psychological Society (NZPsS) is one of the professional associations for psychologists in New Zealand. It is the largest professional body for psychologists in New Zealand, providing for both research psychologists and practicing psychologists.

== History ==
The society began as a branch of the British Psychological Society in 1947, becoming an independent body in 1967. The society's first annual conference was held in 1968, when the society had approximately 150 members. Originally the society was dominated by academic psychologists, but by the 1960s and 1970s, practicing psychologists, primarily clinical psychologists, became a growing voice within the society. Between 1968 and 1978, the society grew to over 600 members.

In the 1970s, the society spoke out against unsafe driving practices, and submitted in support of changes to the Crimes Amendment Bill in 1974, the first parliamentary attempt at homosexual law reform in New Zealand. In 1978, Ann Ballin became the first woman president of the society.

The society was an integral lobbying force in passing the Psychologists Act 1981, which established psychology as a registered profession in New Zealand.

The society is a constituent organisation of Royal Society Te Apārangi.

=== Institutes and divisions ===
Within the society, a number of divisions exist to promote and foster specific fields of psychology. The Clinical Psychology Division was formed in the 1970s, followed by the Counselling Psychology Division in 1985 and the Community and Social Psychology Division was established in 1987. As of 2022, there are seven institutes and one special interest group:

- Institute of Clinical Psychology
- Institute of Community Psychology Aotearoa
- Institute of Counselling Psychology
- Institute of Criminal Justice and Forensic Psychology
- Institute of Educational and Developmental Psychology
- Institute of Health Psychology
- Institute of Organisational Psychology
- Special Interest Group (Coaching Psychology)

== Registration ==
The society has a two-tier approach to membership and professional regulation: a general-scope registration, followed by a specialist scope registration, in a field such as clinical psychology or educational psychology.

== Ethics ==
Members of the society are signatories to the Code of Ethics for Psychologists Working in Aotearoa/New Zealand, which was established in 2002 due to the Health Practitioners Competence Assurance Act 2003. Prior to the establishment of the code, each individual professional association for psychologists in New Zealand had their own code of ethics.

== Presidents ==
The following have been Presidents of the Society.

President	Term
Hubert Sampson	1968–1969
Hugh Priest	1969–1970
Alan Crowther	1970–1971
Clement Hill	1972–1973
T. McKellar	1973–1974
Richard Barham	1974–1975
Jim Ritchie	1975–1976
Michael Malloy	1976–1977
Graham Vaughan	1977–1978
Ann Ballin	1978–1979
John Small	1979–1980
Andrew Hornblow	1980–1981
George Shouksmith	1981–1982
Ross St George	1982–1983
Ted Glynn	1983–1985
Aloma Colgan	1985–1986
Harry Love	1986–1987
Geoff White	1987–1988
Freda Walker	1989–1990
Sharon Driscoll	1990–1991
Michael Hills	1991–1993
Olive Webb	1993–1995
Fred Seymour	1995–1997
Judith McDougall	1997–1999
Ian Evans	1999–2000
Barry Parsonson	2000–2002
Cheryl Woolley	2002–2004
Keriata Paterson	2004–2006
Raymond Nairn	2006–2008
Jack Austin	2008–2010
Frank O'Connor	2010–2012
Peter Coleman	2012–2014
Kerry Gibson	2014–2016
Quentin Abraham	2016–2018
John Fitzgerald	2018–2020
Waikaremoana Waitoki	2020–2022
Tania Anstiss	2022–2024

== Publications ==
- New Zealand Journal of Psychology
- Psychology Aotearoa
