= Bramwell Cook (Salvation Army officer) =

Alfred Bramwell Cook CBE (7 March 1903 – 1 June 1994) was a New Zealand Salvation Army leader and doctor.

== Early life and education ==
Cook was born in Gisborne, New Zealand, on 7 March 1903. His parents were Salvation Army officers who moved around the country to different postings during his childhood. As a child he lived in Taranaki and attended Stratford District High School and later Waitaki Boys' High School in Otago. He studied at the University of Auckland and graduated with a BA from the University of New Zealand in 1924 and MBChB from the University of Otago in 1928.

== Career ==
In 1929 he travelled to Britain where he studied at the London School of Hygiene and Tropical Medicine winning the Duncan Medal; in particular he studied tropical diseases and ophthalmology. He was also a house surgeon at the London Hospital for Tropical Diseases and trained at the Salvation Army’s International Training College in 1931. In 1932 he went to Anand in Gujarat, India as chief medical officer at the Salvation Army's Emery Hospital. He worked there for 22 years. He was awarded an MD in 1948.

Returning to New Zealand he was chief secretary of the Salvation Army from 1954 to 1963. During that time he revitalised the Army's work with alcoholics and established the Bridge treatment programme. He later wrote a booklet entitled Drug taking and drug addiction. He continued the establishment of the Bridge Programme in Australia when he was appointed to command the Australia Eastern Territory of the Salvation Army in 1963.

He retired from the Army in 1968 and became a general practitioner in Christchurch until the late 1980s. He died in Christchurch on 1 June 1994.

== Personal life ==
Cook married Dorothy Frances Money in 1935 in Anand. They had five children. One son Herbert Bramwell Cook became a doctor.

== Honours and awards ==
Cook received the Kaisar-i-Hind Medal in 1935 for service in India. In the 1982 New Year Honours, Cook was appointed a Commander of the Order of the British Empire, for services to the Salvation Army and the community. The Salvation Army awarded him the Order of the Founder in 1983.
