= Julia Rucklidge =

Canadian-born clinical psychologist

icon	Individuals with a conflict of interest, particularly those representing the subject of the article, are strongly advised not to directly edit the article. See Wikipedia:Conflict of interest. You may request corrections or suggest content on the Talk page for independent editors to review, or contact us if the issue is urgent.

Julia Rucklidge is a Canadian-born clinical psychologist who is the director of Te Puna Toiora, the Mental Health and Nutrition Research Lab at the University of Canterbury in New Zealand. Her research has centered on mental health and nutrition.

== Biography ==
Rucklidge received her Bachelor of Science at McGill University in 1992. She went on to earn both her Masters of Science and PhD at the University of Calgary between 1995 and 1998. Rucklidge's PhD explored the psychological functioning of women identified in adulthood with Attention-Deficit/Hyperactivity Disorder.

Rucklidge emigrated to New Zealand in 2000 to take up a lecturer position at the University of Canterbury (Christchurch). She continued to work in clinical roles in addition to academic work, at the Canterbury District Health Board and The Charity Hospital (Christchurch). Rucklidge was appointed the Director of the Clinical Training Programme at University of Canterbury between 2001 and 2004 and again between 2014 and 2016.

Rucklidge's original academic work focused on psychological and neurocognitive functioning in Attention-Deficit/Hyperactivity Disorder in both children and adults. She published widely in the area and is cited over 1000 times for this work. Today, Rucklidge is more widely known for her research on mental health and nutrition. She became interested in this area after she heard about some Canadian families who were using nutrients to treat their children with Bipolar Disorder.

Rucklidge is currently the director of Te Puna Toiora, the Mental Health and Nutrition Research Lab (University of Canterbury). Work from this research lab has explored the impact of nutritional interventions in Attention-Deficit/Hyperactivity Disorder in children and adults, anxiety and stress in adults and children following a series of earthquakes, insomnia, premenstrual syndrome, depression, addictions and emotion dysregulation.

Ongoing work in the Mental Health and Nutrition Research Lab includes trials to explore the impact of nutritional interventions on maternal mental well-being, infant development and anxiety and depression.

== In the media ==
Rucklidge emphasises the importance of nutrition in mental health through her Facebook page, Twitter account and blog ‘Mad in America’. She has been featured in various New Zealand news articles and magazines.

Rucklidge created a free educational series for the public in collaboration with Professor Bonnie Kaplan and in 2014 presented a TEDx talk which has had over 5.1 million views as at October 2024. However, TED has flagged that Rucklidge's talk has fallen outside of TEDx's curatorial guidelines because it oversimplifies interpretations of legitimate studies

== Awards and professional achievements ==
In 2015, Rucklidge was the recipient of the Ballin Award, recognising significant contributions to the development and enhancement of clinical psychology in New Zealand. She was also named one of the most influential women in New Zealand in 2015, 2018 and 2021.

Rucklidge was awarded the Toronto French School Alumni of Distinction Award/Le prix de distinction des anciens élèves in 2017 and in 2018 she received a Braveheart Award recognising her courage, innovation and her effort to improve the lives of people in her community.

== Notable publications ==
- Rucklidge, Julia J; Eggleston, Matthew J.F; Johnstone, Jeanette M; Darling, Kathryn; Frampton, Chris M (2018). "Vitamin-mineral treatment improves aggression and emotional regulation in children with ADHD: A fully blinded, randomized, placebo-controlled trial". Journal of Child Psychology and Psychiatry. 59 (3): 232–246. doi:10.1111/jcpp.12817. PMC 7779340. PMID 28967099.
- Popper, Charles; Kaplan, Bonnie J.; Rucklidge, Julia J. (2017). "Single and broad-spectrum micronutrient treatments in psychiatric practice". In Gerbarg, Patricia L.; Muskin, Philip R.; Brown, Richard P. (eds.). Complementary and Integrative Treatments in Psychiatric Practice. American Psychiatric Pub. pp. 75–101. ISBN 9781615370313.
- Kaplan, Bonnie J; Rucklidge, Julia J; Romijn, Amy R; Dolph, Michael (2015). "A randomised trial of nutrient supplements to minimise psychological stress after a natural disaster". Psychiatry Research. 228 (3): 373–379. doi:10.1016/j.psychres.2015.05.080. PMID 26154816. S2CID 8579580.
- Rucklidge, Julia J; Frampton, Chris M; Gorman, Brigette; Boggis, Anna (2018). "Vitamin–mineral treatment of attention-deficit hyperactivity disorder in adults: Double-blind randomised placebo-controlled trial". British Journal of Psychiatry. 204 (4): 306–315. doi:10.1192/bjp.bp.113.132126. PMID 24482441.
- Sarris, Jerome; Logan, Alan C; Akbaraly, Tasnime N; Amminger, G Paul; Balanzá-Martínez, Vicent; Freeman, Marlene P; Hibbeln, Joseph; Matsuoka, Yutaka; Mischoulon, David; Mizoue, Tetsuya; Nanri, Akiko; Nishi, Daisuke; Ramsey, Drew; Rucklidge, Julia J; Sanchez-Villegas, Almudena; Scholey, Andrew; Su, Kuan-Pin; Jacka, Felice N; International Society for Nutritional Psychiatry Research (2015). "Nutritional medicine as mainstream in psychiatry". The Lancet Psychiatry. 2 (3): 271–274. doi:10.1016/S2215-0366(14)00051-0. PMID 26359904.
- Rucklidge, Julia J; Tannock, Rosemary (2002). "Neuropsychological profiles of adolescents with ADHD: Effects of reading difficulties and gender". Journal of Child Psychology and Psychiatry. 43 (8): 988–1003. doi:10.1111/1469-7610.00227. hdl:10092/554. PMID 12455921.
- Rucklidge, Julia J; Tannock, Rosemary (2001). "Psychiatric, Psychosocial, and Cognitive Functioning of Female Adolescents with ADHD" (PDF). Journal of the American Academy of Child & Adolescent Psychiatry. 40 (5): 530–540. doi:10.1097/00004583-200105000-00012. hdl:10092/6292. PMID 11349697.

== General media articles ==
- "Are micronutrients the answer to NZ's mental health crisis?"
- "Julia Rucklidge: Natural Health Bill a bitter pill for nutrient sector"
- "Food for thought: can nutrients nurture better mental health?"
- "Supplements benefit mental health, With Julia Rucklidge"
