= Bramwell Cook (gastroenterologist) =

New Zealand gastroenterologist

Bramwell Cook CNZM
- Born: Herbert Bramwell Cook; 11 February 1936; Gujarat, British India
- Died: 3 March 2017 (aged 81); Christchurch, New Zealand
- Education: University of Otago
- Spouse: Shirley Ann Hay (m. 1958)
- Scientific career
- Fields: Gastroenterology
- Relatives: Bramwell Cook (father)

Herbert Bramwell Cook CNZM (11 February 1936 – 3 March 2017) was a New Zealand gastroenterologist, noted for his research into the diagnosis and treatment of coeliac disease.

== Biography ==
Cook was the son of Alfred Bramwell Cook and Dorothy Frances Cook (née Money). He was born in Gujarat, India, where his father was a Salvation Army missionary and doctor, and spent most of his first 16 years there. He was educated at Breeks Memorial School in Tamil Nadu from 1942 to 1951, apart from a year at St Andrew's College in Christchurch in 1947–48, before completing his secondary education at Christchurch Boys' High School in 1952 and 1953. After a year at Canterbury University College, he went on to the University of Otago, graduating MB ChB in 1959. Cook married Shirley Ann Hay in 1958, and the couple went on to have three children.

Cook spent his working life from 1960 to 2002 at hospitals in Christchurch, apart from five years in London, England, and Michigan, USA, between 1964 and 1969. He was a clinical lecturer at the Christchurch School of Medicine from 1973 to 2003. Specialising in gastroenterology, Cook's main area of expertise was in the diagnosis and treatment of coeliac disease, and in a study between 1970 and 1999 he and his co-workers showed that the prevalence of the disease in New Zealand was up to seven times greater than had previously been diagnosed.

Cook served on the executive of the New Zealand Society of Gastroenterology between 1970 and 1978, and was its president from 1974 to 1976. He was patron of the Coeliac Society of New Zealand, and held advisory roles with various bodies including the Department of Health, the New Zealand Medical Association, and the Nutrition Society of New Zealand.

Active in the Salvation Army, Cook did voluntary work for that organisation from 1974. In later years he served as archivist for the New Zealand Society of Gastroenterology, and wrote a number of books and papers on New Zealand medical history and the history of the Salvation Army in New Zealand.

Cook died in Christchurch on 3 March 2017.

== Honours and awards ==
Cook became a Fellow of the Royal Australasian College of Physicians in 1973. He was appointed a Companion of the New Zealand Order of Merit in the 2003 Queen's Birthday Honours, for services to medicine and the community.

== Selected works ==
- Cook, H. Bramwell, Michael J. Burt, Judith A. Collett, Martin R. Whitehead, Christopher Ma Frampton, and Bruce A. Chapman. "Adult coeliac disease: prevalence and clinical significance." Journal of gastroenterology and hepatology 15, no. 9 (2000): 1032–1036.
- Collett, J. A., M. J. Burt, C. M. Frampton, K. H. Yeo, T. M. Chapman, R. C. Buttimore, H. B. Cook, and B. A. Chapman. "Seroprevalence of Helicobacter pylori in the adult population of Christchurch: risk factors and relationship to dyspeptic symptoms and iron studies." The New Zealand Medical Journal 112, no. 1093 (1999): 292–295.
- Clark, Sonya A., H. Bramwell Cook, Robert B. G. Oxner, Helen B. Angus, Peter M. George, and Robin Fraser. "Defenestration of hepatic sinusoids as a cause of hyperlipoproteinaemia in alcoholics." The Lancet 332, no. 8622 (1988): 1225–1227.
- Cook, H. Bramwell, J. E. Lennard-Jones, S. M. Sherif, and H. S. Wiggins. "Measurement of tryptic activity in intestinal juice as a diagnostic test of pancreatic disease." Gut 8, no. 4 (1967): 408–414.
