= Waikaremoana Waitoki =

New Zealand psychologist

Waikaremoana Waitoki FRSNZ
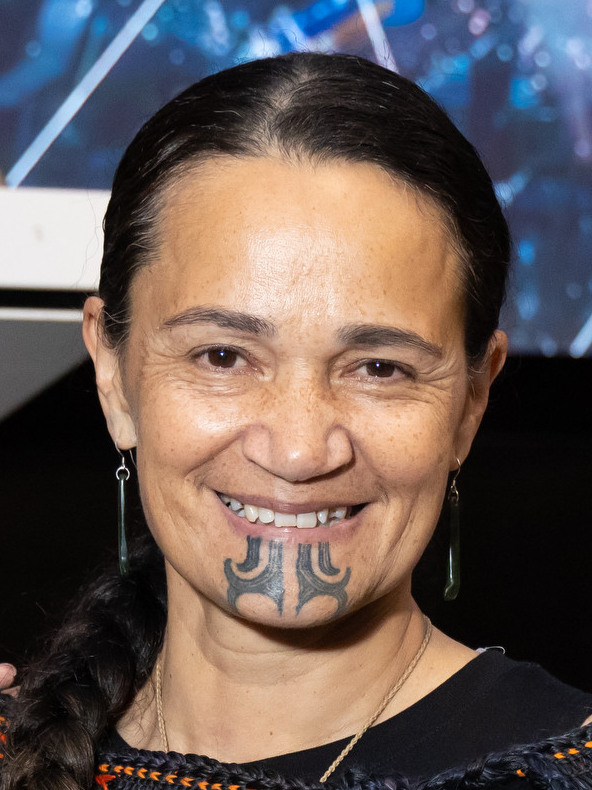
- Waitoki in 2022
- Awards: Te Puāwaitanga Research Excellence Award (2022)
- Scientific career
- Fields: Indigenous psychology, Mātauranga Māori, Cultural competency
- Institutions: University of Waikato
- Thesis: The Development and Evaluation of a Cultural Competency Training Programme for Psychologists Working With Māori: A Training Needs Analysis (2012)

Waikaremoana Waitoki FRSNZ is a New Zealand clinical psychologist, academic, and former president of the New Zealand Psychological Society from 2020 until 2022. She is an associate professor at the University of Waikato, and focuses her research on indigenous psychology, Mātauranga Māori and cultural competency.

== Biography ==
Waitoki graduated from the University of Waikato with a Postgraduate Diploma in Clinical Psychology, becoming a member of the New Zealand Psychological Society's National Standing Committee on Bicultural Issues in 1998. She also has a PhD from the same university, completed in 2012.

From 2002 until 2009, Waitoki was a board member of the New Zealand Psychologists Board. Waitoki was one of the driving forces of the National Māori Graduates of Psychology Symposium, an event held in November 2002. In the early 2010s, Waitoki was the Bicultural Director of the New Zealand Psychological Society.

In 2016, Waitoki published a book entitled Te manu kai i te mātauranga: Indigenous psychology in Aotearoa/New Zealand, a compilation of 18 Māori psychologists' opinions on a single case study.

Since 2018, Waitoki has been an investigator in several large-scale projects. In 2018, she became the lead investigator for a Marsden grant-funded study involving Mātauranga Māori and Indigenous psychology, and in the following year received an additional Marsden grant, as a member of a multidisciplinary team researching Waikato wetland pā using carbon–14 wiggle-match dating (WMD) and dendrochronology to give more precise dates to wetland pā pallisades. In 2019, Waitoki proposed the creation of a Kaupapa Māori-based clinical psychology programme in New Zealand, training Māori clinicians with a Māori world view, in order to address inequalities in the New Zealand mental health system.

Waitoki received two grants from the Ministry of Business, Innovation and Employment in 2020. The first was for a project to investigate Māori maternal health inequalities, entitled Raranga, raranga taku takapau: hapū ora for tamariki, investigating the use of Mātauranga Māori and tikanga to improve the wellbeing of mothers. The second, Working to End Racial Oppression (WERO), is a project examining the impacts of racism, leading towards the development of tools to measure and combat institutional racism.

In 2020, Waitoki became the president of the New Zealand Psychological Society. In the following year, she became a fellow of the New Zealand Psychological Society. Waitoki also works as an advisory member of the Suicide Prevention Office of the Ministry of Health, and as a member of the Film and Literature Classification Board.

In November 2022 Waitoki was awarded the Te Puāwaitanga Research Excellence Award for eminent and distinctive contribution to Te Ao Māori and indigenous knowledge by the Royal Society Te Apārangi, for her work "indigenising the psychology profession".

In 2026 Waitoki was elected a Fellow of the Royal Society Te Apārangi.

== Personal life ==
Waitoki is of Māori descent, from Ngāti Hako and Ngāti Māhanga iwi. Waitoki is ranked 3rd dan in Kyokushin karate. As an instructor, Waitoki uses Māori language during karate lessons.

== Bibliography ==
- Waitoki, Waikaremoana; Nikora, Linda Waimarie; Harris, Parewahaika; Levy, Michelle (October 2014). Māori experiences of bipolar disorder: Pathways to recovery (PDF) (Report). Hamilton, New Zealand: Te Kotahi Research Institute. ISBN 978-1-877537-17-2.
- Waitoki, Waikaremoana; Levy, Michelle, eds. (2016). Te manu kai i te mātauranga: Indigenous psychology in Aotearoa/New Zealand. New Zealand Psychological Society. ISBN 978-0-473-34545-7.
- Pihama, Leonie; Simmonds, Naomi; Waitoki, Waikaremoana (2019). Te Taonga o Taku Ngākau: Ancestral Knowledge and the Wellbeing of Tamariki Māori (PDF) (Report). Hamilton: Te Kotahi Research Institute. ISBN 978-0-9941217-9-0.

== Selected works ==
- Nikora, Linda Waimarie; Masters-Awatere, Bridgette; Waitoki, Waikaremoana; Rua, Mohi (2016). "Indigenous Psychologies, Fourth World Peoples and the International Literature: finding ourselves in online abstracting and indexing databases". The Journal of Critical Psychology, Counselling and Psychotherapy: 214.
- Ruru, Stacey Mariu; Roche, Maree A.; Waitoki, Waikaremoana (2017). "Māori women's perspectives of leadership and wellbeing". Journal of Indigenous Wellbeing. 2 (1): 5–14.
- Pitama, Suzanne G.; Bennett, Simon T.; Waitoki, Waikaremoana; Haitana, Tracy N.; Valentine, Hukarere; Pahina, John; Taylor, Joanne E.; Tassell-Matamua, Natasha; Rowe, Luke; Beckert, Lutz (2017). "A proposed hauora Māori clinical guide for psychologists: Using the hui process and Meihana model in clinical assessment and formulation". New Zealand Journal of Psychology. 46 (3).
- Waitoki, Waikaremoana; Ioane, Julia; Masters-Awatere, Bridgette; Faalogo-Lilo, Christine; Mika, Juile Wharewera (2017). "Indigenous psychologies: Research and practice from Aotearoa New Zealand and the Pacific". New Zealand Journal of Psychology. 46 (3): 6.
- Scarf, D.; Waitoki, W.; Chan, J.; Britt, E.; Nikora, L. W.; Neha, T.; Schimanski, I.; Macfarlane, A. H.; Macfarlane, S.; Bennett, S. T. (2019). "Holding a Mirror to Society? Sociodemographic Diversity Within Clinical Psychology Training Programmes Across Aotearoa". New Zealand Medical Journal. 132 (1495): 79–81. PMID 31095548.
- Waitoki, Waikaremoana (2019). ""This is not us": But actually, it is. Talking about when to raise the issue of colonisation". New Zealand Journal of Psychology. 48 (1): 140.
- McLachlan, Andre David; Waitoki, Waikaremoana (2020). "Collective action by Māori in response to flooding in the southern Rangitīkei region" (PDF). International Journal of Health Promotion and Education. 60: 15–24. doi:10.1080/14635240.2020.1843188. S2CID 228839000.
- McLachlan, Andre; Waitoki, Waikaremoana; Harris, Parewahaika; Jones, Horiana (2021). "Whiti Te Rā: A guide to connecting Māori to traditional wellbeing pathways". Journal of Indigenous Wellbeing. 6 (1): 78–97.
