= Keith Ramsay =

Mayor of Dunedin 1874–1875

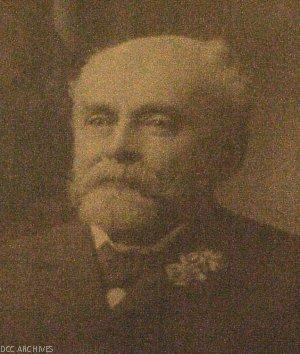
- Keith Ramsay

Mayor of Dunedin
- In office 1874-1875

Personal details
- Born: 4 March 1844; Alyth, Perthshire, Scotland
- Died: 3 May 1906 (aged 62); Dunedin, New Zealand

Keith Ramsay (4 March 1844 – 3 May 1906) was mayor of Dunedin from 1874 to 1875.

Ramsay was born in the manse of Alyth in Perthshire in 1844. His father, William Ramsay, was a parish minister. He received his education at Blairgowrie. After entering in business in Dundee, left for New Zealand, sailing to Port Chalmers on the Jura in 1862. Ramsay became a ship owner, with the coasting steamers Invercargill and Rimu to his name, and was involved in a variety of Dunedin businesses. He was elected to the council in 1874, and was the Chairman of both the Otago Harbour Board and the Chamber of Commerce, and a director of the National Insurance Company. Ramsay died in Dunedin on 3 May 1906, leaving a widow, three sons and six daughters. His fifth daughter, Nora, married the barrister Charles White.
