= University of New Zealand =

Defunct New Zealand university

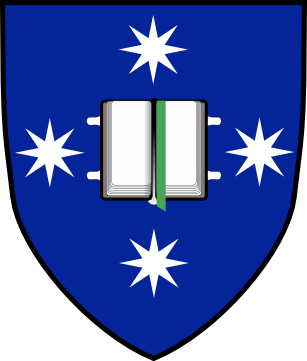
- New Zealand University shield
- Motto: Sapere aude (Have courage to be wise)
- Established: 1870, dissolved 1961
- Location: Campuses all over New Zealand, Senate located in Wellington, New Zealand

The University of New Zealand was New Zealand's sole degree-granting university from 1874 to 1961. It was a collegiate university embracing several constituent institutions at various locations around New Zealand.

After the University of New Zealand was dissolved in 1961, its constituent colleges became four independent degree-granting universities and two associated agricultural colleges: the University of Otago (Dunedin), University of Canterbury (Christchurch), University of Auckland (Auckland), Victoria University of Wellington (Wellington), Canterbury Agricultural College (Lincoln) and Massey Agricultural College (Palmerston North).

== History ==
The University of New Zealand Act set up the university in 1870. At that time, the system's headquarters was in Christchurch, Canterbury Province.

The University of Otago negotiated to keep its title of "university" when it joined the University of New Zealand in 1874, but it agreed to award degrees of the University of New Zealand. The colleges in Christchurch, Auckland and Wellington were known as "university colleges" rather than "universities" throughout most of the history of the University of New Zealand.

The Universities Act of 1961 dissolved the university and granted degree-conferring powers to the former constituent colleges. The New Zealand Vice-Chancellors' Committee assumed certain administrative functions exercised by the University Grants Committee which in turn assumed some functions of the University of New Zealand on its demise.

== Entrance to the university ==
The university set its own entrance examination and awarded scholarships to provide financial assistance for students. When the university was dissolved matters concerning entrance to New Zealand universities became the responsibility of the Universities Entrance Board, a subcommittee of the University Grants Committee. The Universities Entrance Board was in turn merged into the New Zealand Qualifications Authority in 1990.

== Other use of the name ==
Te Wānanga o Aotearoa, founded in 1984, used "The University of New Zealand" as an English translation of its name, although it had no connection with the former university. After objections from bodies such as the New Zealand Vice-Chancellors' Committee (the heads of the universities) and the Ministry of Education over illegal use of a protected word (in this case, "university") and thus possibly misleading advertising, the effective co-branding of the wānanga was phased out. The institution is now formally registered as a wānanga, one of five types of Crown-owned tertiary institutions under New Zealand law, the others being universities, colleges of education, specialist colleges and polytechnics.

== See also ==
- List of honorary doctors of the University of New Zealand
- Tertiary education in New Zealand
- University system (for other federations or unions of universities across the world)
- List of split up universities
