= University of Canterbury Faculty of Law =

New Zealand academic faculty

- Te Kaupeka Ture (Māori)
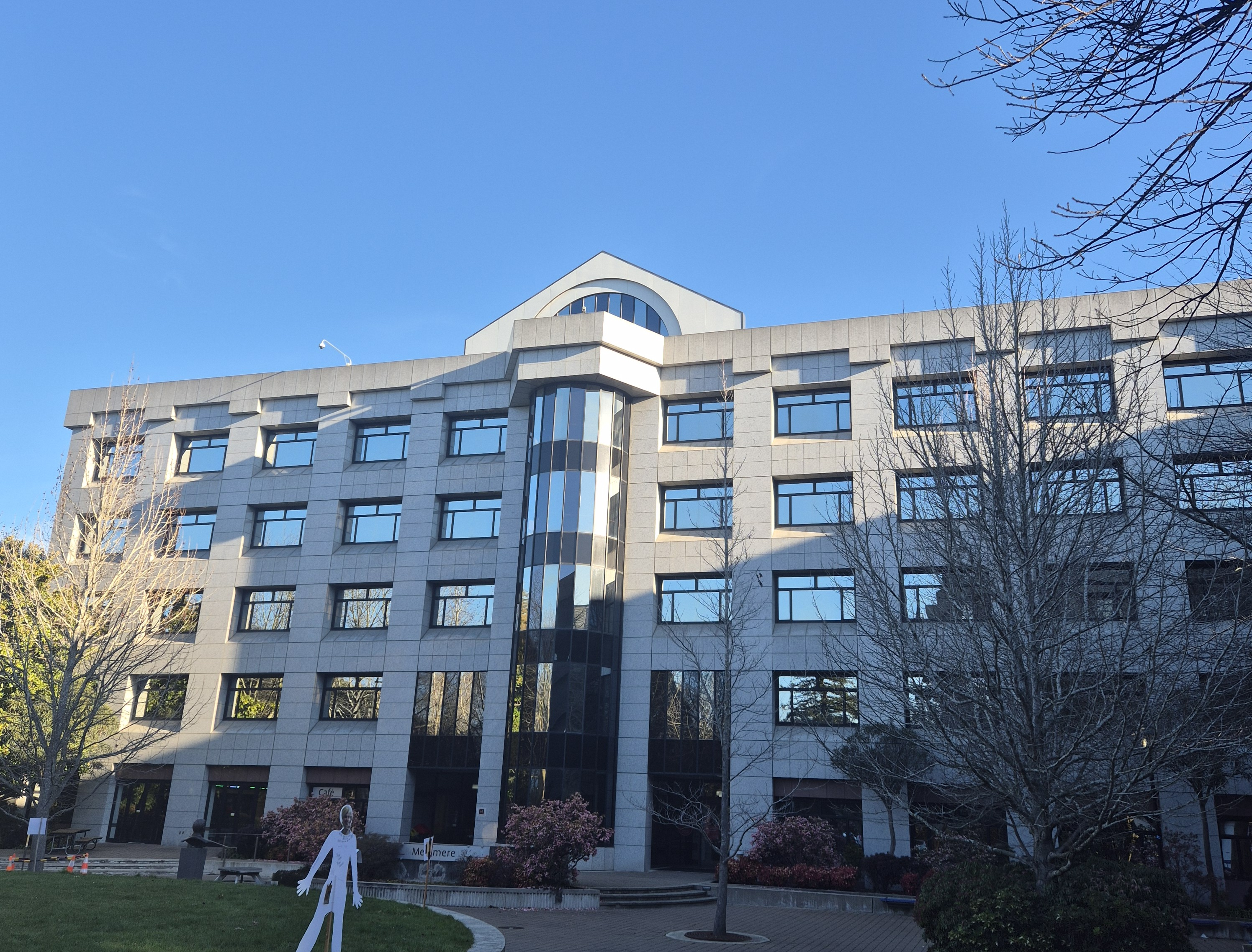
- Meremere Building in August 2024
- Type: Public Law school
- Established: 1873; 153 years ago
- Parent institution: University of Canterbury
- Accreditation: New Zealand Council of Legal Education
- Dean: Petra Butler
- Total staff: 49 (2024)
- Students: 1,534 (2024)
- Location: Christchurch, New Zealand; 43.525°S 172.5844°E
- Website: canterbury.ac.nz/law

The UC Faculty of Law (informally UC Law School; Māori: Te Kaupeka Ture) is the law school at the University of Canterbury. The Canterbury Faculty of Law, established in 1873, is one of New Zealand's two oldest law schools (alongside University of Otago Faculty of Law). The Faculty began offering a Bachelor of Laws (LL.B.) in 1877. The faculty awards degrees in law and criminal justice, including the LL.B., LL.M., and Ph.D.

Originally led by a single practitioner, the faculty's teaching responsibility later shifted to prominent figures like William Izard and George Weston. The faculty grew over time, establishing multiple full-time chairs by 1970, and moved to the Ilam campus in 1974. In 1993, it relocated to a newly constructed law building.

The faculty has several affiliated clubs, including the Law Students' Society (LAWSOC), founded in 1923. It also publishes the Canterbury Law Review, a peer-reviewed journal established in 1980.

Prominent faculty members have included John Burrows, Philip Joseph, Ursula Cheer, and Stephen Todd. The faculty has produced widely used legal texts, and its alumni have made significant contributions to law and public service, including Supreme Court justices William Young and Andrew Tipping, and Prime Minister of Tuvalu, Feleti Teo.

== History ==
The University of New Zealand was founded in 1870. In 1872 the Canterbury Collegiate Union was established and this subsequently became Canterbury University College, affiliated to the University of New Zealand. By 1873, law students had the option to substitute university arts courses for the general knowledge exam, and initial law classes began at the University of Otago and Canterbury University College.

In 1874, Charles James Foster, who had previously served as a professor of jurisprudence at University College London, was appointed as a lecturer in jurisprudence. In 1877, the University of New Zealand introduced the LL.B. The response to Foster's teaching methods in law was largely negative, with practitioners criticising the overly academic nature of his approach. As a result, students chose to complete their courses mainly through private study, leading to the cessation of lectures in early 1880.

In 1883, William Izard took over the role of lecturer. His lectures were described as “sound” and delivered in a “pleasant, informal, and chatty manner.” Izard also promoted “habits of steady reading,” although his demanding lecturing schedule had a negative impact on his bridge-playing activities.

In 1902, George Weston succeeded Izard as lecturer. Weston taught jurisprudence and delivered seven additional lectures on subjects including roman law, international law, and conflict of laws. He encountered difficulties due to an inadequate library and a lack of New Zealand textbooks. Despite these obstacles, Weston's students included “schoolmasters transitioning to new professions, law clerks, and individuals preparing for possible career changes.” Weston and his successors, all of whom were local practitioners, taught alone until 1912, when an assistant lecturer was appointed. The staff was further expanded in 1922 with the addition of another assistant.

By 1970, three permanent full-time chairs in law were established. The first professor, Hamish Gray, was appointed in 1957. Subsequently, two additional chairs were created in 1968, filled by George Hinde and Robin Caldwell, and another chair was established in 1973, which was filled by John Burrows. In January 1974 the Faculty moved from the old University to the Ilam campus.

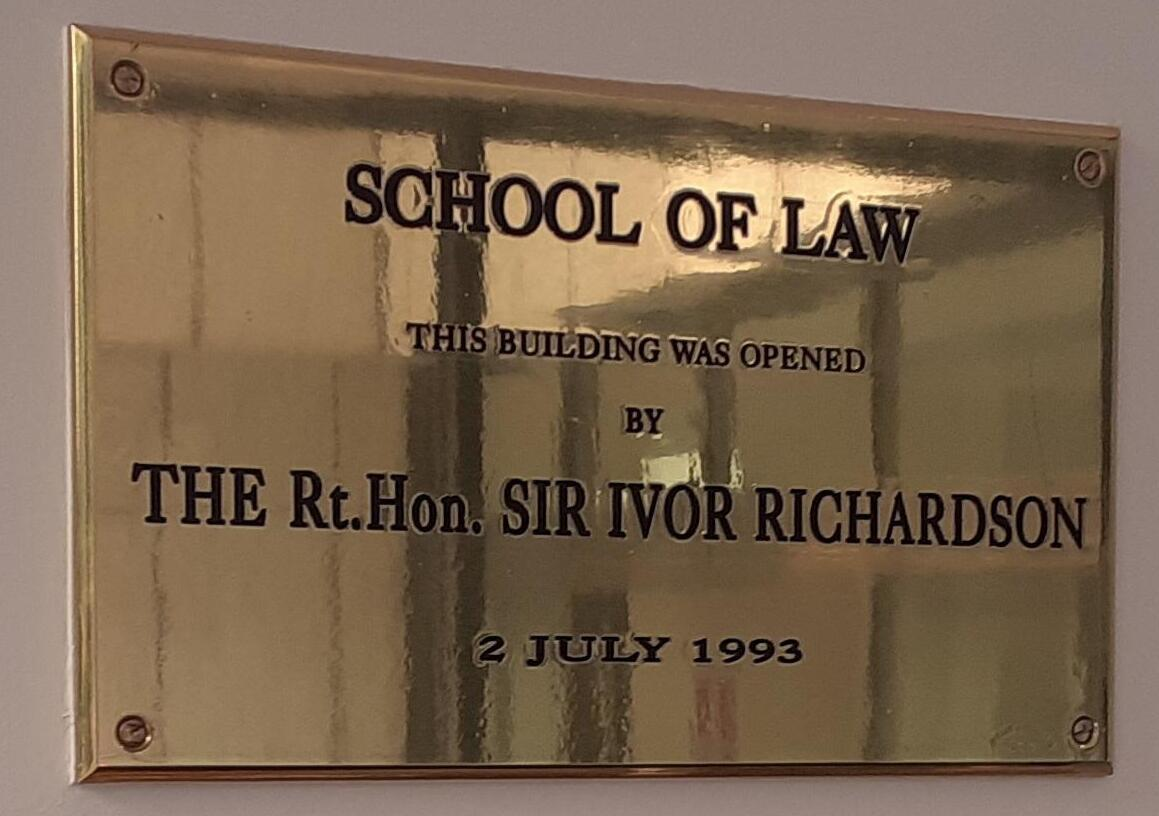
Commemoration plaque for the opening of the Law building.

On the 2 July 1993 the faculty moved into the newly constructed law building (now the Meremere building). The building was officially opened by alumnus and then Court of Appeal Justice, Ivor Richardson.

Prior to 2023, the faculty of law was joined with the UC Business School, under the college of business and law. As part of a realignment of faculty organisation, in 2023 the college was split with the law and business becoming separate faculties. Currently located in the Meremere building at Canterbury's Ilam campus, the faculty will move to the Karl Popper building in 2025.

== Academic profile ==
The faculty awards the degrees of Bachelor of Laws (LL.B.), Bachelor of Laws with Honours (LL.B.(Hons)) Master of Laws (LL.M.), Bachelor of Criminal Justice (B.CJ.), Master of Criminal Justice (M.CJ.), Doctor of Philosophy (Ph.D.), and the Doctor of Laws (LL.D.). Canterbury is the only University to offer the bachelor and master of criminal justice in New Zealand from 2014.

The Canterbury Gold Medal in Law is one of New Zealand's longest-standing academic prizes and is awarded annually to the best student graduating LL.B. at the University of Canterbury. The prize was first awarded in 1883, but was originally awarded to barristers and to solicitors until 1912, when the Canterbury District Law Society awarded the prize only to Canterbury graduates. Notable winners include former Supreme Court Justices Andrew Tipping & William Young; and former President of the Court of Appeal Ivor Richardson.

The law faculty also runs a range of extra-curricular competitions for students, including mooting, negotiations, witness examination, paper presentation, and client interviewing. Winners of each competition represent Canterbury at the New Zealand Law Students' Association (NZLSA) Conference, competing against other law schools from New Zealand, and at the Australian Law Students' Association (ALSA) Conference, competing against law schools from Australia. The winner of the NZLSA moot represents New Zealand at the Jessup Moot. The winner of the Canterbury mooting competition is awarded the Colin Fife Memorial Prize, in honor of former student Colin Fife, a past winner of the competition and Jessup mooter, former judge’s clerk for Robert Chambers, and co-author of Law and Sport with Elizabeth Toomey.

== Organisations and publications ==
Lawsoc Logo 2023

UC Law has eight affiliated clubs: the Law Students' Society (LAWSOC), Te Putaiki Māori Law Students' Society, Pasifika Law Students' Society (PLSS), Asian Law Students' Society (ALSS), Women in Law, Law for Change, MootSoc, Crimsoc, and Queer in Law (QUIL). Among these, LAWSOC is the oldest, having been established in 1923. Notable presidents include former High Court Justice Gerald Nation and current High Court Justice Andru Isac.

LAWSOC annually presents the "Law Revue" a production written and performed by law students. The revue offers satirical commentary on current affairs, pop culture, law, and university life. It has been a tradition since its inception in 1995, running for 28 years. In 2019, students faced disciplinary action due to their involvement in a revue production that included content mocking a partially deaf student. Other parts of the show, dubbed "disgusting" by one attendee, were criticised for being sexist and racist.

The Canterbury Law Review is a peer-reviewed law journal established in 1980. The journal is the second most-read law journal in New Zealand.

Canterbury Law Review
- Discipline: Law
- Language: English

Publication details
- History: 1980–present
- Publisher: Canterbury Law Review Trust at the University of Canterbury (New Zealand)
- Frequency: Annually

Standard abbreviations
- Bluebook: Canta LR
- ISO 4: Canterb. Law Rev.

Indexing
- ISSN: 0112-0581

Links
- Journal homepage; Online archive

A significant number of the textbooks used in legal studies in New Zealand were authored by faculty members from the University of Canterbury's Faculty of Law. Some notable texts include:

- Joseph, Phillip (2021). Joseph on Constitutional and Administrative Law (5th ed.). Wellington: Thomson Reuters. ISBN 9781988553450.
- Todd, Stephen, ed. (2023). Todd on Torts (9th ed.). Wellington: Thomson Reuters. ISBN 9781991102379.
- Todd, Stephen; Barber, Matthew (2022). Burrows, Finn and Todd on the Law of Contract in New Zealand (7th ed.). Wellington: LexisNexis. ISBN 9781988546704.
- Toomey, Elizabeth, ed. (2017). New Zealand Land Law (3rd ed.). Wellington: Thomson Reuters. ISBN 9781988504681.
- Cheer, Ursula (2021). Burrows and Cheer Media Law in New Zealand (8th ed.). LexisNexis. ISBN 9781988546117.
- Toomey, Elizabeth (2023). Sports Law in New Zealand (4th ed.). Auckland: Wolters Kluwer. ISBN 9789403505473.
- Taylor, Lynne (2021). The Law of Insolvency in New Zealand (2nd ed.). Wellington: Thomson Reuters. ISBN 9781990018572.
- Taylor, Lynne; Watson, Susan, eds. (2018). Corporate Law in New Zealand. Wellington: Thomson Reuters. ISBN 9781988553757.

== Notable people ==
Since 1873, the Canterbury Faculty of Law has produced a prominent group of alumni. Chief Justice of New Zealand Helen Winkelmann noted that "Canterbury Law School has produced many of the giants of our profession [...] its alumni have made important contributions to the law. I cannot do justice to the extent of that contribution today – time does not allow".

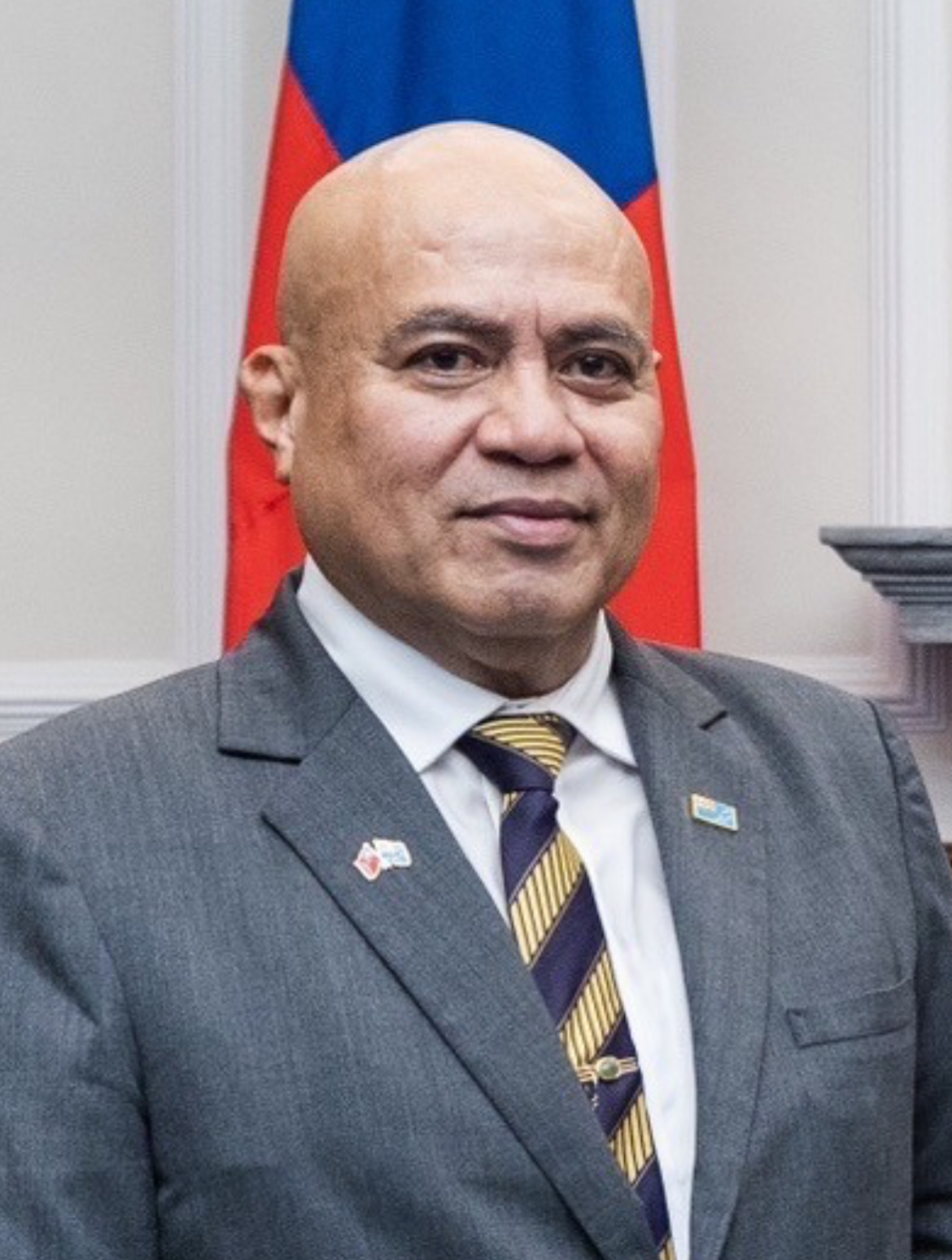
Feleti Teo, Prime Minister of Tuvalu (LLB, 1986)

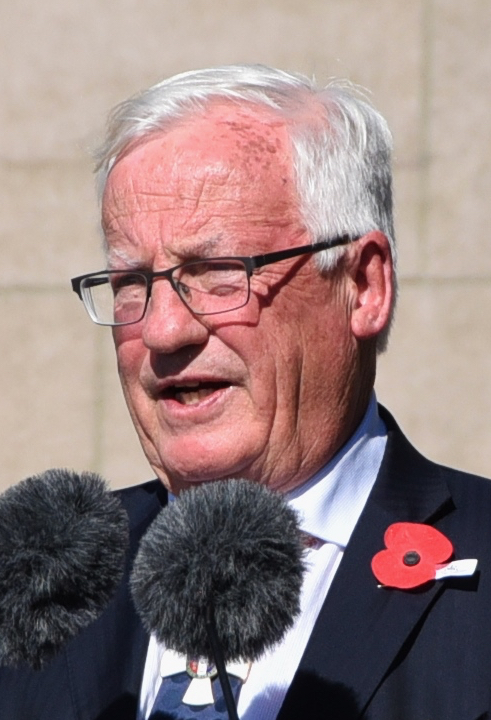
William Young, Justice of the Supreme Court (LLB(Hons), 1974)

Notable faculty members include:

- John Burrows, former professor of contract and media law; pro- and deputy vice chancellor of the University of Canterbury.
- Petra Butler, international commercial law and human rights law scholar.
- Ursula Cheer, professor of tort and media law.
- Kenneth Gresson, first President of the Court of Appeal.
- Philip Joseph, professor of public law.
- Elizabeth Macpherson, professor.
- Annick Masselot, professor.
- Elisabeth McDonald, former professor of evidence law.
- Karen Scott, professor of international law.
- Edward Somers, Justice of the Court of Appeal.
- Stephen Todd, (emeritus) professor of tort and contract law.
- Elizabeth Toomey, (emeritus) professor of land law.
- Duncan Webb, politician; and former professor of legal ethics.
- Debra Wilson, professor of medicine law.

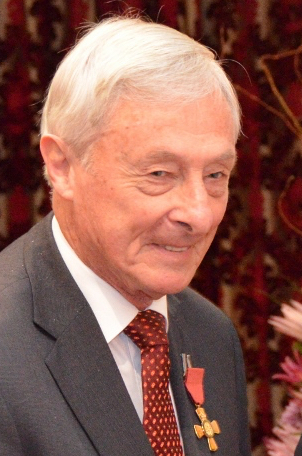
John Burrows was a part of the faculty's teaching staff from 1963 – 2006; Professor from 1975; and Dean from 1980 – 1986.

The list of deans are:

- 1957 – 1968, Hamish Gray
- 1969 – 1969, Position Vacant
- 1970 – 1974, L. John Ryan
- 1975 – 1980, Robert Caldwell
- 1980 – 1986, John Burrows
- 1987 – 1988, John Farrar
- 1989 – 2001, Gerald Orchard
- 2002 – 2002, Stephen Todd
- 2003 – 2004, Scott Davidson
- 2005 – 2005, Stephen Todd
- 2006 – 2008, Scott Davidson
- 2009 – 2009, Position Vacant
- 2010 – 2012, Richard Scragg
- 2012 – 2015, Chris Gallavin
- 2016 – 2022, Ursula Cheer
- 2022 – 2023, John Page
- 2023 – 2024, Karen Scott (acting)
- 2024 – present, Petra Butler
