= Fiona Hayes-Renshaw =

Irish academic

- Occupation: Academic
- Employer: College of Europe
- Known for: Research on the Council of the European Union and EU decision-making

Academic background
- Education: College of Europe
- Alma mater: London School of Economics

Academic work
- Discipline: Political science International relations European studies
- Notable works: The Council of Ministers (with Helen Wallace)

Fiona Hayes-Renshaw is an Irish academic known for her work on European Union institutions, particularly the Council of the European Union and its decision-making practices. She has been a visiting professor at the College of Europe in Bruges since 2001.

== Early life and education ==
Hayes-Renshaw studied at the College of Europe (Jean Rey Promotion 1983–1984). She completed a PhD in International Relations at the London School of Economics in 1991.

== Career ==
Hayes-Renshaw has worked as a researcher at Chatham House and served as press and information officer at the European Round Table of Industrialists in Brussels (1989–1991). She was a professor at the Université libre de Bruxelles (1991–1992).

From 1997 to 2001, she taught at the College of Europe campus in Natolin, where she was associated with political science and EU decision-making courses. She has continued to teach and supervise students at the College of Europe in Bruges, including courses on negotiation and decision-making in the European Union.

She is the author of The Council of Ministers (with Helen Wallace) (Palgrave Macmillan, 2006).

== Selected works ==
- Hayes-Renshaw, Fiona; Lequesne, Christian; Mayor Lopez, Pedro (1989). "The Permanent Representations of the Member States to the European Communities". Journal of Common Market Studies.
- Hayes-Renshaw, Fiona; Wallace, Helen (1995). "Executive power in the European Union: The functions and limits of the Council of Ministers". Journal of European Public Policy.
- Hayes-Renshaw, Fiona; Wallace, Helen (1997). The Council of Ministers. Macmillan.
- Wallace, Helen; Hayes-Renshaw, Fiona (2003). Reforming the Council: A Work in Progress? Swedish Institute for European Policy Studies (SIEPS).
- Hayes-Renshaw, Fiona; Wallace, Helen (2006). The Council of Ministers (2nd ed.). Palgrave Macmillan / Red Globe Press.
- Hayes-Renshaw, Fiona; Van Aken, Wim; Wallace, Helen (2006). "When and Why the EU Council of Ministers Votes Explicitly". Journal of Common Market Studies.
