= Debra Wilson (academic) =

New Zealand law professor

- Born: 1977

Academic background
- Education: University of Canterbury
- Thesis: The legality of human cloning: an analysis of the legal arguments for and against a ban on reproductive cloning from a eugenics/human rights viewpoint (2009)

Debra Wilson (born 1977) is a New Zealand legal academic, and is a full professor at the University of Canterbury. She specialises in law and medicine, particularly law around surrogacy and the use of genetic testing.

== Academic career ==
Wilson completed a Master's degree at the University of Canterbury followed by a PhD titled The legality of human cloning: an analysis of the legal arguments for and against a ban on reproductive cloning from a eugenics/human rights viewpoint at Monash University. Her thesis topic stemmed from an interest in how law deals with new medical technologies. She was awarded the Mollie Holman Doctoral Medal for Excellence for 2009 in the Faculty of Law. Wilson then joined the faculty of the University of Canterbury, teaching in intellectual property, competition law and law and medicine. She was appointed full professor in 2024.

Wilson held an Erskine Fellowship at the University of Cambridge, where she was Rutherford Visiting Fellow at Trinity College, and another Erskine Fellowship at the University of Oxford. Wilson was also a Fulbright Scholar at Georgetown University. In 2014 Wilson was awarded a Teaching Award by the University of Canterbury.

Wilson is particularly interested in how law responds to changes in technology. She led a three-year multidisciplinary research project around surrogacy law in New Zealand, examining public opinions on existing surrogacy law, and the experiences of legal professionals advising clients. Wilson wrote a book, published in 2015, on the legal issues with the use of genetic testing in criminal investigations and trials.

== Selected works ==
- "It's time to fix NZ's Sentencing Act, which lets too many young sex offenders avoid jail". Policing Insight. 23 May 2023.
- Wilson, Debra (24 August 2021). "Law Commission's Review of Surrogacy Laws Explained". TR – Legal Insight New Zealand.
- Wilson, Debbie (2015). Genetics, crime and justice. Cheltenham, UK; Northampton, MA, USA: Edward Elgar Publishing. ISBN 978-1-78347-881-1. OCLC 905955921.
- Wilson, Debra (3 October 2022). "Outrage over a rapist's home detention highlights the need for victims' voices in NZ's sentencing process". The Conversation.
- Masselot, Annick; Wilson, Debra; Ceballos, Martha (9 September 2021). "Who are my parents? Why New Zealand's 'creaky' surrogacy laws are overdue for major reform". The Conversation.
- Taylor, Lynne; Erik Brogt; Cheer, Ursula; Natalie Baird; John Caldwell; Wilson, Debra J. (2016). "Ethnicity and engagement in first-year New Zealand law programmes". Higher Education Research and Development. 36 (5): 1047–1060. doi:10.1080/07294360.2016.1263935. Wikidata Q126942675.
- Taylor, Lynne; Cheer, Ursula; Baird, Natalie; Caldwell, John; Wilson, Debra (19 May 2015). The Making of Lawyers: Expectations and Experiences of First-year New Zealand Law Students – Research report. ako.ac.nz (Report).
