= Petra Butler =

New Zealand law academic

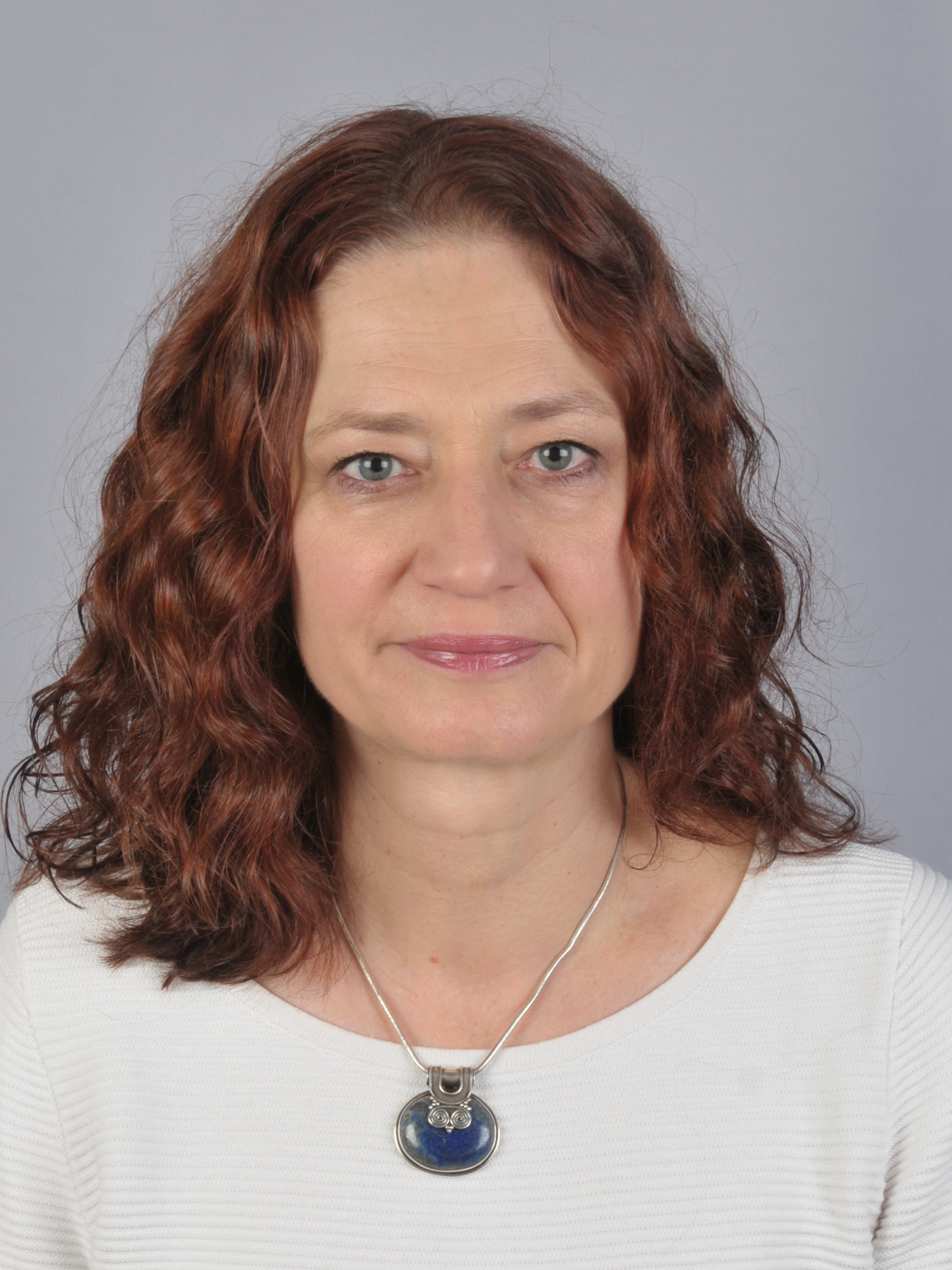

Executive Dean of the University of Canterbury Faculty of Law
- Incumbent
- Assumed office 5 February 2024
- Preceded by: Karen Scott (interim)

Personal details
- Born: 1966 (age 59–60) Brunswick, Germany
- Citizenship: New Zealand
- Education: University of Göttingen (PhD) Victoria University of Wellington (LL.M)
- Known for: International Commercial Law and Human Rights Law

Petra Butler (née Kriebel) is a New Zealand law academic who serves as Dean of Law at the University of Canterbury. She was formerly a full professor at the Victoria University of Wellington. She is a scholar in international commercial law and human rights law.

== Early life and studies ==
Butler grew up in Brunswick, where she attended the Gymnasium Ricarda-Huch-Schule graduating in 1985. Butler studied law at the Julius Maximillian University of Würzburg and the Georg August University of Göttingen where she was a researcher for Professor Dr Erwin Deutsch at the Chair of International Private and Comparative Law.

She completed her LLM at Victoria University of Wellington in 1992 on a scholarship of the German Academic Exchange Service, studying inter alia environmental law under Sir Geoffrey Palmer. After completing her Referendariat at the Oberlandesgericht Braunschweig and as part of the Referendariat being a judge's clerk at the South African Constitutional Court for Justice Kate O'Regan in 1995/1996 she took a position as a researcher at the German Research Institute for Public Administration.

== Academic career ==
After a 1998 PhD titled 'Medical misadventure im neuseeländischen Accident Compensation Scheme : eine Antwort auf die Unzulänglichkeiten des tort law oder ein fehlgeschlagener Versuch?' at the University of Göttingen about New Zealand's Accident Compensation Corporation, Butler moved to the Victoria University of Wellington, rising to full professor. Butler has held visiting positions around the world, including the Universidad de Navarra (Pamplona- since 2013); Pritzker School of Law, Northwestern University (Chicago), Chinese University of Political Science and Law (Beijing); University of Montevideo; Bucerius Law School (Hamburg); Hamad bin Khalifa University (Doha), University of Adelaide; Bahir Dar University (Ethiopia).

In 2004 she was the Holgate Fellow at Grey College, University of Durham and in 2008 she was a Senior Fellow at the University of Melbourne. She was a Scholar-in-Residence for prominent law firm Wilmer Cutler Pickering Hale and Dorr in 2015, 2018 and 2019, and an invited guest of the Max Planck Institute Luxembourg in 2019. She was named in Victoria University's Honours List in 2015 and 2020, and was appointed British Insititue of International and Comparative Law Honorary Senior Fellow in 2020.

Butler is the New Zealand United Nations Commission on International Trade Law correspondent for the United Nations Convention on Contracts for the International Sale of Goods and the United Nations Convention on the Use of Electronic Communications in International Contracts

She is currently working on research focused on access to justice, including access to justice of small and medium-sized enterprises, on an international scale. Trying to create a globally accepted framework for dispute resolution between enterprises. The Commonwealth Study of International Commercial Arbitration in the Commonwealth, for which she was the lead consultant and which she co-authored had a particular focus on SMEs. Additionally, she is supplementing a decade-long focus on the pacific islands with broader attention on small countries as Director of the Institute of Small and Micro States.

== Published works ==
According to Butler's list of publications she has published four monographs, has edited ten books, has over 50 articles and book chapters, and a 13 technical reports. She is the series co-editor of The World of Small States.

- UN Law on International Sales, co-authored with Peter Schlechtriem
- The New Zealand Bill of Rights Act 1990: a commentary, co-authored with Andrew Butler

== Professional career ==
Butler is a fully qualified German lawyer and a barrister and solicitor of the High Court of New Zealand. She is working as a barrister. She has been involved as a consultant expert, inter alia, in Child Poverty Action Group v Attorney General, Boscawen v Attorney-General, New Health Ltd v South Taranaki District Council, and the Austrian litigation that ensued from the Patterson fraud.
