= Philip Joseph =

Phil(l)ip Joseph may refer to:

- Phil Joseph (born 1985), rugby league footballer
- Philip Joseph (politician), African American politician in Reconstruction-era Alabama
- Philip Joseph, Prince of Salm-Kyrburg (1709–1779), prince of Salm-Kyrburg, 1743–1779
- Philip Joseph (academic), New Zealand law professor
- Phillip Joseph, actor in Great Expectations (1981 TV serial)
