= List of law schools in New Zealand =

This is a list of law schools in New Zealand.

- School of Law, Auckland University of Technology
- Faculty of Law, University of Auckland
- Faculty of Law, University of Waikato, Hamilton
- Faculty of Law, Victoria University of Wellington
- Faculty of Law, University of Canterbury, Christchurch
- Faculty of Law, University of Otago, Dunedin
