= Lord Wallace =

Lord Wallace may refer to:

- Jim Wallace, Baron Wallace of Tankerness, Deputy First Minister of Scotland and Liberal Democrat life peer
- Thomas Wallace, 1st Baron Wallace, British 19th-century politician
- William Wallace, Baron Wallace of Saltaire, academic, writer and Liberal Democrat life peer
