= Rachelle Buchbinder =

Australian rheumatologist and medical researcher'

Rachelle Buchbinder AO FAA FAHMS
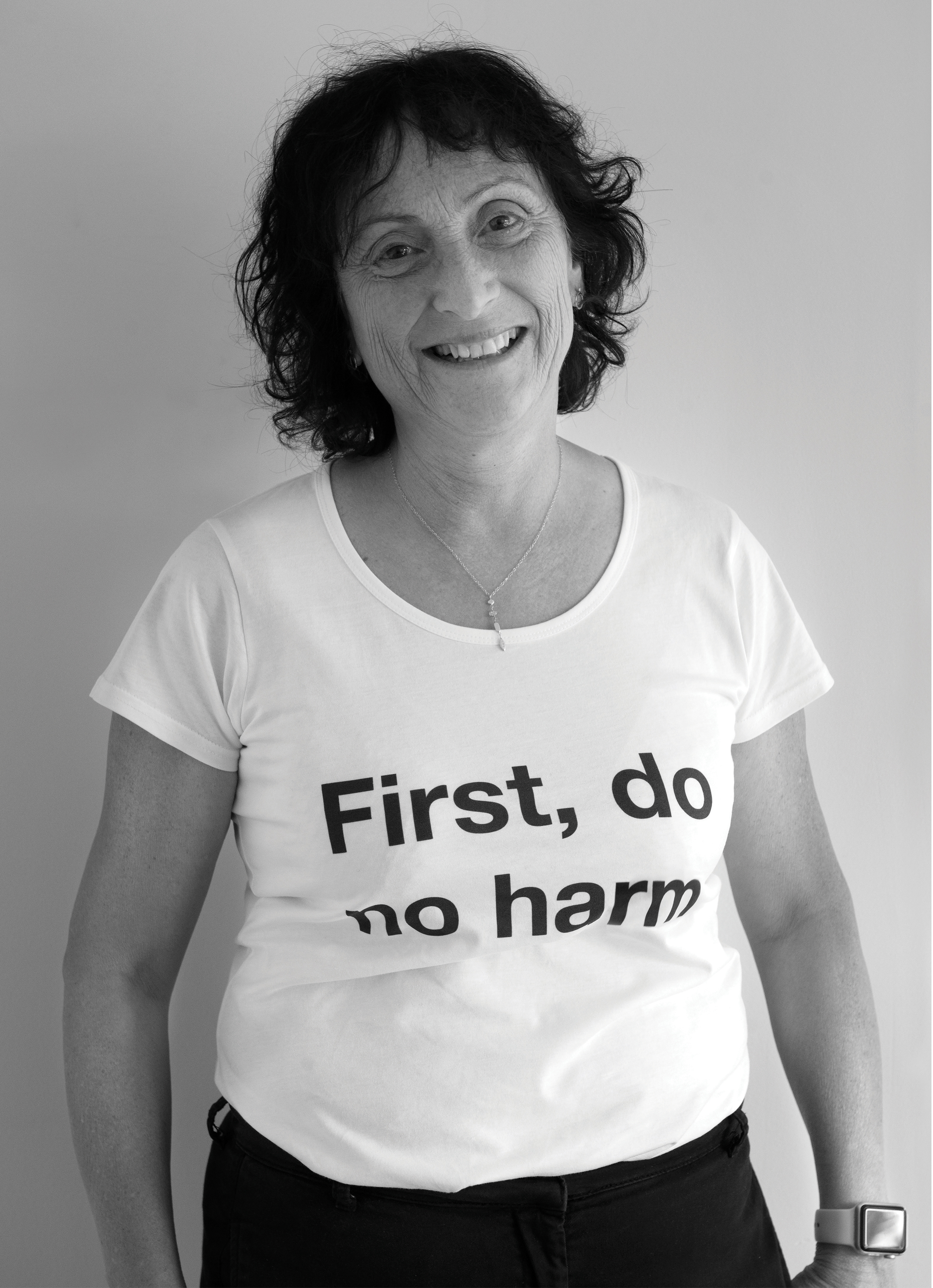
- Rachelle Buchbinder, portrait from the exhibition 'Women', 2019
- Born: 1958 (age 67–68)
- Education: Monash University; University of Toronto
- Occupations: Rheumatologist and clinical epidemiologist
- Employer(s): Monash University, School of Public Health and Preventive Medicine, and Monash Department of Clinical Epidemiology – Cabrini Institute
- Known for: Research into arthritis and musculoskeletal conditions, improving communication with patients and health literacy

Rachelle Buchbinder (born 1958) is an Australian rheumatologist and clinical epidemiologist. Her clinical practice is in conjunction with research involving multidisciplinary projects relating to arthritis and musculoskeletal conditions. She promotes improvement of communication with patients and health literacy in the community.

== Education ==
Buchbinder holds a Bachelor of Medicine, Bachelor of Surgery, (MBBS) (Hons) from Monash University in Melbourne, Australia.

She earned a Master of Science (MSc) in Clinical Epidemiology from Toronto University, Canada in 1993. Her thesis topic was "The classification of soft tissue disorders of the neck and upper limb for epidemiological research."

The topic for Buchbinder's doctoral dissertation was "Short and long-term effects of a public health media campaign designed to reduce disability associated with back pain." Her PhD was awarded in 2006 by Monash University, Melbourne.

== Career ==
Buchbinder was made founding Director of the Monash Department of Clinical Epidemiology in 2001. She became Professor in the Monash University Department of Epidemiology and Preventive Medicine in 2007.

Buchbinder is currently (2020) an Australian National Health and Medical Research Council (NHMRC) Senior Principal Research Fellow. She is also Coordinating Editor of the Cochrane Musculoskeletal Group which "produces reliable, up-to-date reviews of interventions for the prevention, treatment or rehabilitation of musculoskeletal disorders in the form of systematic reviews."

Buchbinder is a founding member and, current Steering Group Chair of the Australia & New Zealand Musculoskeletal (ANZMUSC) Clinical Trial Network.

In 2015 Buchbinder was made a Fellow of the Australian Academy of Health and Medical Sciences.

She was President of the Australian Rheumatology Association from 2016 to 2018 and is currently (2020) Chair, Australian Rheumatology Association Database (ARAD) Management Committee and Registry Custodian of the Australian Rheumatology Association Database.

Buchbinder chaired the steering group for The Lancet Low Back Pain Series which published 3 papers in March 2018. The series looks to reverse the trend of ineffective and dangerous treatments for lower back pain which has both personal and global impacts.

She has a broad range of multidisciplinary research projects relating to arthritis and musculoskeletal conditions as well as improving communication with patients and health literacy which are funded by National Health and Medical Research Council (NHMRC) schemes and research grants. These include reducing over testing, over-diagnosis and waste in health care, identifying more efficient service delivery models, implementing the Australian Clinical Care Standard for osteoarthritis of the knee and developing a decision aid for knee arthroscopy, developing a set of outcome measures for trials of shoulder disorders, developing a Back Pain Burden Questionnaire and the Back Pain Misconceptions Questionnaire, investigating support for people with sub-optimal health literacy and studying the long term outcome of inflammatory arthritis in Australia.

Buchbinder is frequently consulted as a spokesperson for evidence-based care and waste of resources in medicine particularly in her specialist fields. By 2019 she had published over 540 papers, been cited 48,078 times, and inspired many clinician-scientists.

The high influence of her work is evidenced by her recognition by Clarivate Analytics as a Highly Cited Researcher (in top 1% by citations across more than one field) in both 2018 and 2019.

== Awards ==
Buchbinder won the Volvo Award in Clinical Studies 2001 and the Triennial Parr Prize in Rheumatology, 2004.

In February 2007 Buchbinder's doctoral thesis won the Mollie Holman Doctoral Medal for Excellence, Faculty of Medicine, Nursing and Health Sciences

She received a commendation in Premier's Award for Medical Research (Victoria) in 2007 for her evaluation of impact of a mass-media campaign ‘Back Pain: Don't take it lying down’. The campaign aimed to educate Victorians about back pain and provide up to date advice on its management. Globally it was the first implementation of a public health approach for back-related disability.

In 2010 she was honoured as the Metro Ogryzlo Professor for the annual Ogryzlo Day in Toronto, Canada.

Buchbinder held a NHMRC Practitioner Fellowship from 2005 to 2014 and currently holds an NHMRC Senior Principal Research Fellowship 2015 to 2020.

In 2016 Buchbinder gave the Opening Plenary at the IV International Low Back and Neck Pain Forum.

In both 2010 and 2011 she and her colleagues won the Helen Moran Award from Arthritis Victoria

In 2018 she was awarded a Rockefeller Foundation Academic Writing Fellowship at the Bellagio Centre in Italy.

In January 2020 Buchbinder was made an Officer (AO) in the General Division of the Order of Australia for "distinguished service to medical education in the fields of epidemiology and rheumatology, and to professional associations."

In October 2022 the Council of the Royal Society of Victoria announced Buchbinder for the 2022 Medal for Excellence in Scientific Research (Category II – the Biomedical and Health Sciences). The Research Medal recognises peak research career achievements and outstanding leadership in research by scientists working in the State of Victoria.

She was elected a Fellow of the Australian Academy of Science in 2024.
