= William Wallace, Baron Wallace of Saltaire =

British politician and writer (born 1941)

The Right Honourable The Lord Wallace of Saltaire PC
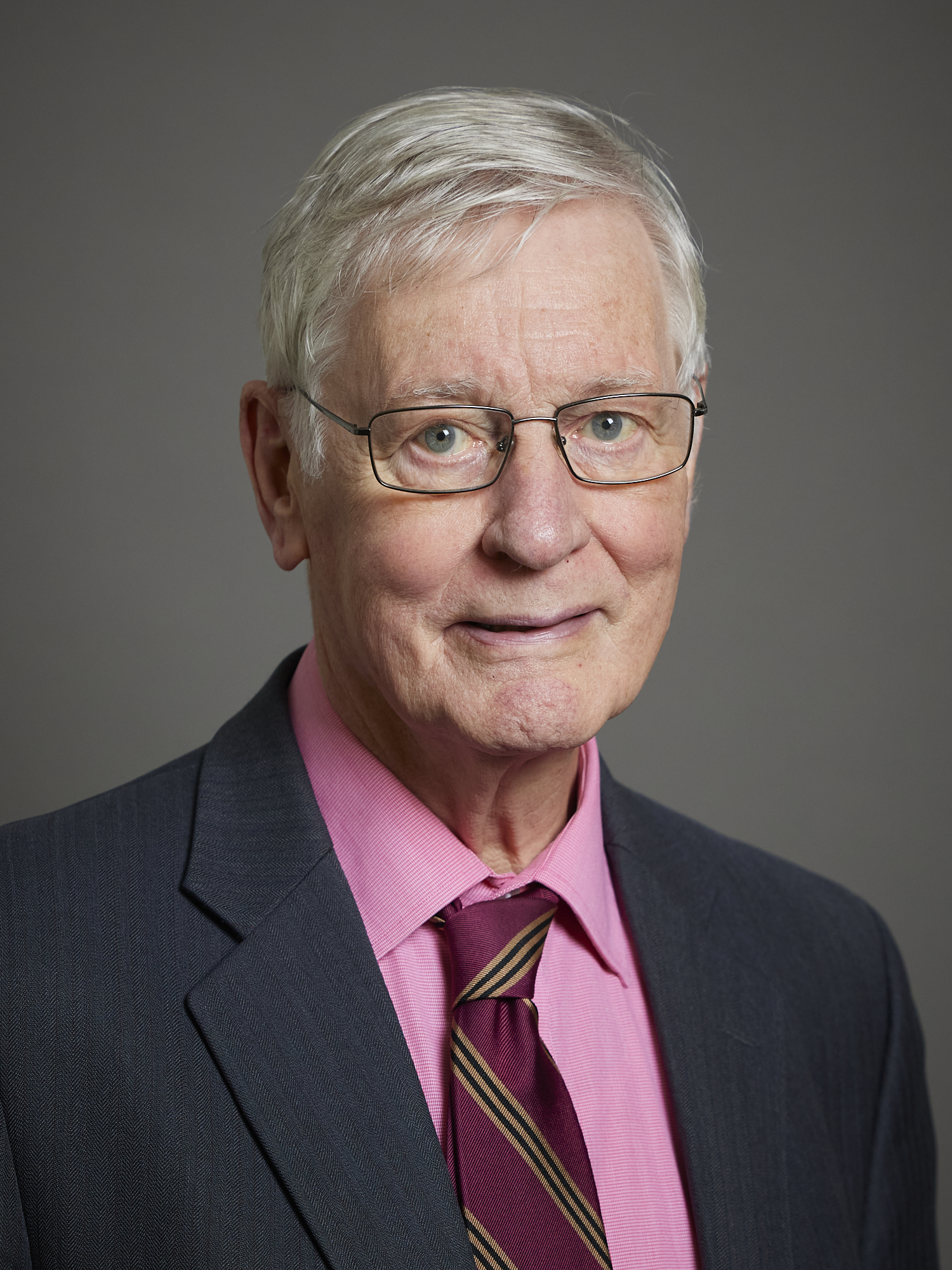
- Official portrait, 2024

Lord-in-waiting Government Whip
- In office 13 October 2010 – 7 May 2015
- Prime Minister: David Cameron
- Preceded by: The Lord Faulkner of Worcester
- Succeeded by: The Viscount Younger of Leckie

Member of the House of Lords
- Lord Temporal
- Life peerage 19 December 1995

Personal details
- Born: 12 March 1941 (age 85)
- Party: Liberal Democrats
- Education: King's College, Cambridge; Cornell University

William John Lawrence Wallace, Baron Wallace of Saltaire, PC (born 12 March 1941 in Leicester), is a British academic, writer, and Liberal Democrat politician, who was a Lord in Waiting from 2010 to 2015.

== Early life ==
Wallace was educated at Westminster Abbey Choir School, where as a chorister he sang at the Coronation of Queen Elizabeth II in 1953, and St Edward's School, Oxford. He went to King's College, Cambridge, in 1959, reading History (BA). As an undergraduate at Cambridge, Wallace joined all three political clubs (Conservative, Labour, and Liberal). He decided that the Liberal Party was the most attractive and, in 1961, he was elected vice-president of the Cambridge University Liberal Club, later becoming its president.

After graduating from Cambridge Wallace travelled to the United States, where he spent three years working towards his PhD at Cornell University, finishing his thesis on the Liberal Revival of 1955–66 while in residence at Nuffield College, Oxford. During this time at Oxford, he met his future wife, Helen Sarah Rushworth, who was president of the Oxford University Liberal Club. They were married on 25 August 1968 and have two children, Harriet (born 1977) and Edward (born 1981), both of whom were, like their father, educated at Cambridge.

== Academic career ==
Wallace began his academic career as a lecturer in the Department of Government at the University of Manchester where he taught between 1966 and 1977.

Wallace served as director of Studies of the Royal Institute of International Affairs 1978–1990.

From 1990 to 1995 Wallace was the Walter Hallstein Senior Research Fellow at St Antony's College, Oxford. He also served on the editorial board of Soviet Studies.

Between 1993 and 1996 he was a visiting professor at the Central European University where he was involved in setting up the International Relations Department.

In 1995 he moved to the London School of Economics and Political Science where he took up a position as reader in international relations in 1999, becoming a professor of international relations. He became an emeritus professor in 2005. He is chair of the advisory board of LSE IDEAS, a centre for the study of international affairs, diplomacy and grand strategy.

One of his many doctoral students was Olli Rehn.

He has also been a visiting fellow/professor at institutions in the US, Germany, France, Italy, Greece and Belgium.

== Politics ==
He joined the Liberal Party whilst studying at Cambridge and served as vice-president and then president of the Cambridge University Liberal Club.

In the 1966 United Kingdom general election, Wallace served as the Liberal Party's Assistant Press Officer, responsible for Jo Grimond's press activities.

Remaining active in Liberal politics, Wallace unsuccessfully contested five parliamentary elections. He stood in Huddersfield West in 1970, Manchester Moss Side in both February 1974 and October 1974, and Shipley in 1983 and 1987.

He also served as a speechwriter for David Steel and as vice-chairman of the Standing Committee 1977–1987. He was co-author of the 1979 Liberal and 1997 Liberal Democrat election manifestos. During the Liberal-SDP Alliance, 1982–1987, he was a member of the joint party steering committee. In 2004 he became the president of the Yorkshire regional Liberal Democrat Party. In 2005 he returned to the Federal Policy Committee as the Lords representative, serving on several party policy groups.

He has also served as chair of the advisory board of the liberal think tank, CentreForum.

Lord Wallace is president of the Liberal Democrat History Group. He took over this position after the death of Conrad Russell in 2004.

In 1995 he was awarded the French Chevalier, Ordre du Mérite. In 2005 he was awarded the Légion d'Honneur in recognition of his long-standing efforts to promote the European Union.

In the summer of 2004, he travelled to Georgia, South Ossetia and Abkhazia in the company of Anna Politkovskaya.

In April 2010, he courted controversy when he partially defended Jenny Tonge, another Liberal Democrat peer following an interview she gave to the Jewish Chronicle in which she called for an investigation into claims of Israeli organ harvesting in Haiti.

== Peerage ==
Wallace was created a life peer on 19 December 1995, taking the title Baron Wallace of Saltaire, of Shipley in the County of West Yorkshire. He made his maiden speech on 17 January 1996 during a debate on education. He retains a house in Saltaire. From 1999 to 2005, parliamentarians from three chambers, Chris Leslie MP in the House of Commons, Lord Wallace of Saltaire in the House of Lords and Richard Corbett MEP in the European Parliament, all lived in Saltaire.

In 1997 Wallace became a member of the Select Committee on the European Communities and chairman of the Sub-Committee on Justice and Home Affairs 1997–2000. In 2001 he became the Liberal Democrats' main frontbench spokesperson in the House of Lords on foreign affairs and in November 2004 was elected joint Deputy Leader of the Liberal Democrat Peers.

Following the setting up of the Conservative-Liberal Democrat Coalition after the 2010 general election Wallace was appointed a Government Whip acting as government spokesperson in the House of Lords on the Foreign and Commonwealth Office, the Department for Work and Pensions and the Department for Education.

== Membership of organisations ==
Wallace is a trustee of the National Children's Choir; a member of Atlantic Community Advisory Board; chair of the Board of Voces Cantabiles (professional choir, not-for-profit musical and educational work); is vice president of the Upper Wharfedale Agricultural Society; and is a member and shareholder of the Wensleydale Railway Association.

In the past Wallace has served as a council member of the Royal Institute of International Affairs; a board member of Genius of the Violin; a chairman of the Academic Advisory Committee and a trustee of Goodenough College, London; chair of the advisory board of the Cold War Studies Centre, London School of Economics; co-chair of the British-Dutch bilateral 'Appeldoorn' Conference; was patron of the Saltaire Festival; and was patron of the Shipley Glen Tramway.

== Publications ==
- William Wallace, 'British External Relations and the European Community: the Changing Context of Foreign Policy-Making', "Journal of Common Market Studies" 12(1) 28-52 (1973)
- Geoffrey Edwards and William Wallace, “A Wider European Community? Issues and problems of further enlargement” (London, 1976)
- William Wallace, “The Foreign Policy Process in Britain” (London: Allen and Unwin, 1977)
- William Wallace, “Reform of Government” (London: Liberal Publications Department, 1977)
- William Wallace, 'After Berrill: Whitehall and the management of British diplomacy', “International Affairs” 54(2) 220-239 (1978)
- William Peterson and William Wallace, “Foreign Policy Making in Western Europe: A Comparative Approach” (Farnborough, Hants: Saxon House, 1978)
- William Wallace, 'Diplomatic trends in the European Community', “International Affairs” 55(1) 47-66 (1979)
- William Wallace, “The Illusion of Sovereignty” (London: Liberal Publications Department, 1979)
- William Wallace, “Britain in Europe” (London: Heinemann, 1980)
- Michael Hodges and William Wallace, eds, “Economic Divergence in the European Community” (London: RIIA, 1981)
- William Wallace, 'European defence co-operation: the reopening debate', “Survival” 26(6) 251-261 (1984)
- William Wallace, “Britain's bilateral links within Western Europe” (London:Routledge and Kegan Paul, 1984)
- William Wallace, 'What price independence? Sovereignty and interdependence in British politics', “International Affairs” 62(3) 367-389 (1986)
- William Wallace, 'Franco-British cooperation and the structure of defence in Europe' (French title, 'La coopération franco-britannique et la construction de l'Europe de la défense'), “Enjeux internationaux travaux et recherches de l'IFRI” 37(10) 195-206 (1988)
- Christopher Tugendhat and William Wallace, “Options for British foreign policy in the 1990s” (London: RIIA, 1988)
- Helen Wallace and William Wallace, 'Strong state or weak state in foreign policy? The contradictions of Conservative liberalism, 1979-1987', “Public Administration” 68(1) 83-101 (1990)
- William Wallace, 'Introduction' – “the dynamics of European integration. The dynamics of European integration”. London and New York: Pinter Publishers (1990)
- William Wallace, “The nation state and foreign policy. French and British foreign policies in transition - the challenge of adjustment” (New York: Berg Publishers, 1990)
- William Wallace, “The transformation of Western Europe” (London:Pinter, 1990)
- William Wallace, 'Foreign policy and national identity in the United Kingdom', “International Affairs” 67(1) 65-80 (1991)
- William Wallace, “West European unity - implications for peace and security. Towards a future European peace order?”, Basingstoke: Macmillan Academic and Professional (1991)
- William Wallace, ‘Germany at the centre of Europe’ in “The Federal Republic of Germany - the end of an era” (Providence, RI: Berg Publishers, 1991) 167-174
- William Wallace, ed, “The Dynamics of European Integration” (London: Pinter, 1991)
- William Wallace, 'British foreign policy after the Cold War', “International Affairs” 68(3) 423-442 (1992)
- William Wallace, 'No tinkering please – we are British', “World Today” 48:8-9 (1992)
- William Wallace, 'Foreword' in “Southern European security in the 1990s” (London: Pinter Publishers, 1992)
- William Wallace, 'European-Atlantic security institutions: current state and future prospects', “International spectator” XXIX:3 37-52 (1994)
- William Wallace, 'Rescue or retreat? The nation state in Western Europe, 1945-93', “Political studies” XLII 52-76 (1994)
- William Wallace, 'Evropsko-atlantické bezpecnostní instituce: stav a vyhlídky' (The European-Atlantic Security Organization: the current situation and prospects) “ezinárodní vztahy” 1 21-30 (1994)
- William Wallace, “Regional integration: the West European experience” (Washington, DC: Brookings Institution, 1994)
- William Wallace, 'Deutschland als europäische Führungsmacht' (Germany as a leading power in Europe) “Internationale Politik” 50(5) 23-28 (1995)
- William Wallace and Julie Smith, 'Democracy or technocracy? European integration and the problem of popular consent', “West European politics” 18(3) 137-157 (1995)
- William Wallace, 'Germany as Europe's leading power', “World Today” 51:8-9 162-164 (1995)
- Helen Wallace and William Wallace, “Flying Together in a Larger and More Diverse European Union” (The Hague: Netherlands Scientific Council for Government Policy, 1995)
- William Wallace, “Opening the Door: the enlargement of NATO and the European Union” (London: Centre for European Reform, 1996)
- William Wallace, 'On the move – destination unknown', “World Today” 53(4) 99-102 (1997)
- William Wallace, “Why Vote Liberal Democrat” (London: Penguin, 1997)
- William Wallace, “Liberal Democrats and the Third Way” (London: Centre for European Reform, 1998)
- Wilfried Loth, William Wallace and Wolfgang Wessells, “Walter Hallstein: the forgotten European?” (New York: St. Martin's Press, 1998)
- William Wallace, 'The sharing of sovereignty: the European paradox', “Political Studies” XLVII:3 503-521 (1999)
- William Wallace, 'Europe after the cold war: interstate order or post-sovereign regional system?', “Review of International Studies” 25 201-224 (1999)
- William Wallace, 'From the Atlantic to the Bug, from the Arctic to the Tigris? The transformation of the EU', “International Affairs” 76(3) 475-494 (2000)
- Robin Niblett and William Wallace, eds, “Rethinking European Order: West European Responses, 1989-97” (New York: St. Martin's Press, 2000)
- William Wallace, 'Europe, the necessary partner', “Foreign affairs” 80(3) 16-34 (2001)
- Daphne Josselin and William Wallace, “Non-state actors in world politics” (Basingstoke: Palgrave, 2001)
- Anthony Forster and William Wallace, 'What is NATO for?', “Survival” 43(4) 107-122 (2001)
- William Wallace, 'Where does Europe end?’ in “Dilemmas of inclusion and exclusion. Europe unbound: enlarging and reshaping the boundaries of the European Union” (London: Routledge 2002)
- William Wallace, 'As viewed from Europe: transatlantic sympathies, transatlantic fears', “International Relations” 16(2) 281-285 (2002)
- William Wallace, “Reconciliation in Cyprus: the window of opportunity” (Florence: European University Institute, 2002)
- Bastian Giegerich and William Wallace, 'Not such a soft power: the external deployment of European forces', “Survival” 46(2) 163-182 (2004)
- William Wallace, 'British foreign policy: broken bridges', “World Today” 60(12) 13-15 (2004)
- Helen Wallace, William Wallace, and Mark A. Pollack, eds, Policy-making in the European Union (5th edn, Oxford: Oxford University Press, 2005; 4th edn, ed. Helen Wallace and William Wallace, Oxford: Oxford University Press, 2000; 3rd edn, ed. Helen Wallace and William Wallace, Oxford: Oxford University Press, 1996; 2nd edn, ed. Helen Wallace, William Wallace, and Carole Webb, Chichester: Wiley, 1983; 1st edn, ed. Helen Wallace, William Wallace, and Carole Webb, London: Wiley, 1977)
- William Wallace, “Europe or Anglosphere? British Foreign Policy Between Atlanticism and European Integration” (London: John Stuart Mill Institute, 2005)
- Tim Oliver and William Wallace, 'A bridge too far: the United Kingdom and the transatlantic relationship' in “The Altlantic alliance under stress: US-European relations after Iraq” (Cambridge: Cambridge University Press, 2005)
- William Wallace, 'The European mistrust of American leadership', in “Patriotism, democracy, and common sense: restoring America's promise at home and abroad” (Lanham MD: Rowman & Littlefield, 2005)
- William Wallace, 'The collapse of British foreign policy', “International Affairs” 81(1) 53-68 (2005)
- William Wallace, 'European Union a treaty too far', “World Today” 61(7) 4-6 (2005)
- William Wallace, 'Europe and the war on terror', in “Understanding global terror” (Cambridge, Malden MA: Polity Press, 2007)
- William Wallace, 'Diplomacy: Foreign Office futures', “World Today” 64(2) 22-25 (2008)
- William Wallace, 'Less words and more deeds in constructing Europe', “International Spectator”. 43(4) 19-24 (2008)
- Christopher Phillips and William Wallace, 'Reassessing the special relationship', “International Affairs” 85(2) 263-284 (2009)

== Notes ==
Orders of precedence in the United Kingdom
Preceded by The Lord Winston	Gentlemen; Baron Wallace of Saltaire	Followed by The Lord McNally
