= Helen Wallace =

British academic, historian and political scientist

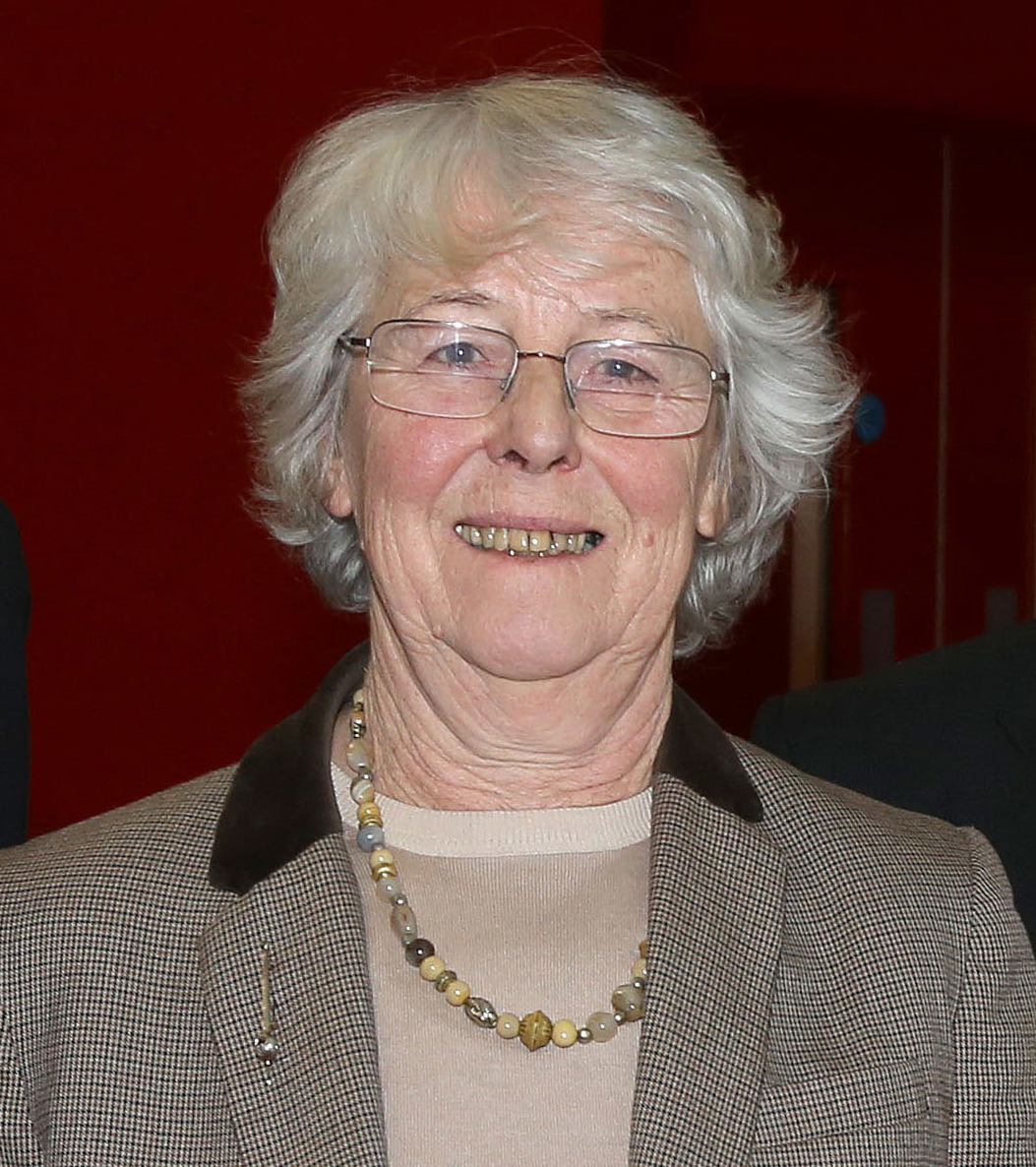
Wallace in 2014

Dame Helen Sarah Wallace, Lady Wallace of Saltaire, DBE, CMG, FBA, MAE, FAcSS (born 25 June 1946 in Whalley Range, Manchester), née Rushworth, is a British expert in European studies and, by marriage to William Wallace, Baron Wallace of Saltaire, a peeress. She was Foreign Secretary of the British Academy from 2011 to 2015.

She attended Oxford University (1963–67), where she was President of the Oxford University Liberal Club and where she obtained a BA in Classics. Having already met her future husband, William Wallace, at Oxford, she spent a year at Bruges, Belgium, undertaking postgraduate studies at the College of Europe (1967–68).

== Marriage/family ==
Helen Rushworth married William Wallace on 25 August 1968; the couple have two children, Harriet (born 1977) and Edward (born 1981).

== Career ==
Helen Wallace studied at the University of Manchester (1969–73), where she completed her doctoral thesis with the title The Domestic Policy-making Implications of the Labour Government's Application for Membership of the EEC (1975). She obtained a Certificate of Advanced European Studies at the College of Europe in 1968.

She was lecturer in European Studies at the University of Manchester Institute of Science and Technology (UMIST) 1974–78 and in 1976 was appointed Visiting Professor at the College of Europe, a position she continued to hold until 2001. She was a lecturer at the Civil Service College 1978–85, and, briefly, a member of the planning staff at the Foreign and Commonwealth Office 1979–80. In 1985, she was appointed Senior Research Fellow and Director of the West-European Programme at the Royal Institute of International Affairs, Chatham House.

In 1992 she took up the first of several appointments at the University of Sussex, where she was Jean Monnet Professor of Contemporary European Studies and founding Director of the Sussex European Institute. In 1998 she became Director of the Economic and Social Research Council programme One Europe or Several? and became Co-Director of the institute. From 2001 until 31 August 2006 she was Director of the Robert Schuman Centre for Advanced Studies at the European University Institute in Florence, Italy. She was Centennial Professor in the European Institute at the London School of Economics and Political Science from 2007 to 2010.

In the 1970s she was Secretary and Chair of UACES (the academic association for Contemporary European Studies). She was a board member for the Brussels-based think-tank, Bruegel (2006–13). For Her Majesty's Government she was a member of the Better Regulation Commission and for the European Commission a member of the Group of Political Analysis and the Advisory Group for Social Sciences. She has been, since 2004, Chair of the Conseil universitaire européen pour l'Action Jean Monnet.

== Affiliations ==
Professor Dame Helen Wallace serves as editor of the book series One Europe or Several? and New Europe published by Palgrave Macmillan and was co-editor of the New European Politics series published by Oxford University Press. She has also served as a member of the editorial advisory boards of the journals Journal of Common Market Studies, British Journal of Politics and International Relations, Co-operation and Conflict, Perspectives, European Union Politics, and Policy Studies.

== Honours ==
In 1996, she was appointed a Chevalier de l'Ordre National du Mérite by the President of the French Republic. She was appointed Companion of the Order of St Michael and St George (CMG) in the 2000 New Year Honours and Dame Commander of the Order of the British Empire (DBE) in the 2011 New Year Honours for services to social science.

She was elected a Fellow of the British Academy in June 2000. She has been awarded honorary degrees by the universities of Sussex, Loughborough and Aston and by the Institut d’Études Politiques in Paris.

In 2015 she was awarded the All European Academies Madame de Staël Prize for Cultural Values. In the same year she was elected a Member of the Academia Europaea.

== Publications ==
- Helen, Wallace; van Biezen, Ingrid (July 2013). "Old and new oppositions in contemporary Europe". Government and Opposition. 48 (3). Cambridge Journals: 289–313. doi:10.1017/gov.2013.11.
- Fiona Hayes-Renshaw and Helen Wallace, The Council of Ministers (2nd edn, Basingstoke; New York: Palgrave Macmillan, 2006; 1st edn, Basingstoke: Macmillan, 1997)
- Helen Wallace, William Wallace, and Mark A. Pollack, eds, Policy-making in the European Union (5th edn, Oxford: Oxford University Press, 2005; 4th edn, ed. Helen Wallace and William Wallace, Oxford: Oxford University Press, 2000; 3rd edn, ed. Helen Wallace and William Wallace, Oxford: Oxford University Press, 1996; 2nd edn, ed. Helen Wallace, William Wallace, and Carole Webb, Chichester: Wiley, 1983; 1st edn, ed. Helen Wallace, William Wallace, and Carole Webb, London: Wiley, 1977)
- Helen Wallace, The future of Europe debate: opportunities for British policy (Brighton: Sussex European Institute, 2001)
- Helen Wallace, ed., Interlocking dimensions of European integration (Basingstoke: Palgrave, 2001)
- Alisdair R. Young and Helen Wallace, Regulatory politics in the enlarging European Union: weighing civic and producer interests (Manchester: Manchester University Press, 2000)
- Helen Wallace, 'Whose Europe is it anyway?', European Journal of Political Research 35 (1999), 287–306
- Helen Wallace, Coming to terms with a larger Europe: options for economic integration (Falmer: Sussex European Institute, 1998)
- Helen Wallace and Alasdair R. Young, eds, Participation and policy-making in the European Union (Oxford: Clarendon Press, 1997)
- Helen Wallace and Alasdair R. Young, Balancing public and private interests under duress (Brighton: Sussex European Institute, 1996)
- Helen Wallace, From an island off the north-west coast of Europe (Brighton: Sussex European Institute, 1996)
- Helen Wallace, The shaping of Europe: progress and prospect (Ditchley Park: Ditchley Foundation, 1995)
- Anna Michalski and Helen Wallace, The European Community: the challenge of enlargement (2nd edn, London: Royal Institute of International Affairs, 1992; 1st edn 1992)
- Helen Wallace, ed., The wider Western Europe: reshaping the EC/EFTA relationship (London: Pinter for the Royal Institute of International Affairs, 1991)
- Françoise de La Serre, Jacques Leruez, and Helen Wallace, eds, French and British foreign policies in transition: the challenge of adjustment (New York; Oxford: Berg, 1990)
- Françoise de la Serre, Jacques Leruez, and Helen Wallace, eds, Les Politiques étrangères de la France et de la Grande-Bretagne depuis 1945: l'inévitable ajustement (Paris: Presses de la Fondation Nationale des Sciences Politiques, 1990)
- Marc Wilke and Helen Wallace, Subsidiarity: approaches to power-sharing in the European Community (London: Royal Institute of International Affairs, 1990)
- Helen Wallace, Widening and deepening: the European Community and the new European agenda (London: Royal Institute of International Affairs, 1989)
- Ralf Dahrendorf, Helen Wallace, and Russell Johnston, Towards greater democracy and unity in Europe (London: TEAM Promotions, 1988)
- J. Jamar & Helen Wallace, eds, EEC-EFTA, more than just good friends? (French title, CEE-AELE, mariage en vue?) (proceedings of the symposium organised by the College of Europe, Bruges, 30 June-2 July 1988, Bruges: De Tempel, 1988)
- Jacques Pelkmans and L. Alan Winters with Helen Wallace, Europe's domestic market (London: Routledge, 1988)
- James Eberle and Helen Wallace, British space policy and international collaboration (London: Routledge & Kegan Paul, 1987)
- Helen Wallace with Adam Ridley, Europe: the challenge of diversity (London: Routledge & Kegan Paul for Royal Institute of International Affairs, Chatham House papers, 1985)
- Helen Wallace, Budgetary politics: the finances of the European Communities (London: Allen & Unwin, 1980)
- Geoffrey Edwards and Helen Wallace, The Council of Ministers of the European Community and the President-in-Office (London: Federal Trust for Education and Research, 1977)
- Helen Wallace, National governments and the European Communities (London: Chatham House, 1973)
