= David Wood (mathematician) =

Australian mathematician (born 1971)

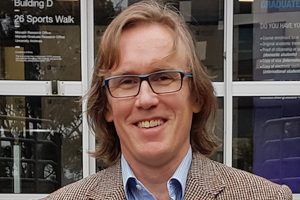
David Ronald Wood, October 2018

David Ronald Wood (born in Christchurch, New Zealand in 1971) is a Professor in the School of Mathematics at Monash University in Melbourne, Australia. His research area is discrete mathematics and theoretical computer science, especially structural graph theory, extremal graph theory, geometric graph theory, graph colouring, graph drawing, and combinatorial geometry.

Wood received a Ph.D. in computer science from Monash University in 2000. His thesis "Three-Dimensional Orthogonal Graph Drawing", supervised by Graham Farr, was awarded a Mollie Holman Doctoral Medal. He held postdoctoral research positions at the University of Sydney, at Carleton University in Ottawa, at Charles University in Prague, at McGill University in Montreal, at Universitat Politècnica de Catalunya in Barcelona, and at the University of Melbourne. Since 2012 he has been at Monash University, where he was promoted to Professor in 2016.

He has been awarded distinguished research fellowships including a Marie Curie Fellowship from the European Commission (2006–2008), a QEII Fellowship from the Australian Research Council (2008–2012), and a Future Fellowship from the Australian Research Council (2014–2017). David Wood was an invited speaker at the 9th European Congress of Mathematics.

Wood is a Fellow of the Australian Mathematics Society and life member of the Combinatorial Mathematics Society of Australasia (CMSA). He was president of the CMSA in 2015–2016 and Vice-President in 2011–2014. He is a Deputy Director of The Mathematical Research Institute MATRIX. Wood is an editor of the Electronic Journal of Combinatorics, Editor-in-Chief of the MATRIX Book Series, and an editor of the Journal of Computational Geometry, Journal of Graph Theory, and SIAM Journal on Discrete Mathematics. His main research contributions are in graph product structure theory, extremal graph minor theory, graph treewidth, graphs on surfaces, graph colouring, geometric graph theory, poset dimension, and graph drawing.

== Major publications ==
- Vida Dujmović; Gwenaël Joret; Piotr Micek; Pat Morin; Torsten Ueckerdt; David R. Wood (2020). "Planar graphs have bounded queue-number". Journal of the Association for Computing Machinery. 67 (4). Article 22. arXiv:1904.04791. doi:10.1145/3385731.
- Alex Scott; David R. Wood (2020). "Better bounds for poset dimension and boxicity". Transactions of the American Mathematical Society. 373 (3): 2157–2172. arXiv:1804.03271. doi:10.1090/tran/7962.
- Jan van den Heuvel; David R. Wood (2018). "Improper colourings inspired by Hadwiger's conjecture". Journal of the London Mathematical Society. 98 (1): 129–148. arXiv:1704.06536. doi:10.1112/jlms.12127.
- Kevin Hendrey; David R. Wood (2018). "The extremal function for Petersen minors". Journal of Combinatorial Theory, Series B. 131: 220–253. arXiv:1508.04541. doi:10.1016/j.jctb.2018.02.001.
- Bruce Reed; David R. Wood (2016). "Forcing a sparse minor". Combinatorics, Probability and Computing. 25 (2): 300–322. arXiv:1402.0272. doi:10.1017/S0963548315000073. S2CID 993264.
- Vida Dujmović; Pat Morin; David R. Wood (2005). "Layout of graphs with bounded tree-width". SIAM Journal on Computing. 34 (3): 553–579. arXiv:cs/0406024. doi:10.1137/S0097539702416141. S2CID 3264071.
