= Journal of Common Market Studies =

- Discipline: European studies
- Language: English
- Edited by: Toni Haastrup, Richard Whitman, Mills Soko, Heather MacRae, Annick Masselot, Alasdair R. Young

Publication details
- History: 1962-present
- Publisher: John Wiley & Sons on behalf of UACES
- Frequency: Bimonthly
- Impact factor: 3.990 (2020)

Standard abbreviations
- ISO 4: J. Common Mark. Stud.

Indexing
- ISSN: 0021-9886 (print); 1468-5965 (web)
- LCCN: 65071201
- OCLC no.: 39263251

Links
- Journal homepage; Online access; Online archive

The JCMS: Journal of Common Market Studies is a bimonthly peer-reviewed academic journal covering the politics and economics of European integration, focusing principally on developments within the European Union, European politics more broadly and comparative regionalism (politics). It was established in 1962 and is published by John Wiley & Sons on behalf of UACES (the Academic Association for Contemporary European Studies). The editors-in-chief are Toni Haastrup (University of Stirling) and Richard Whitman (University of Kent) and the co-editors are Heather MacRae (York University), Annick Masselot (University of Canterbury), Mills Soko (University of Witwatersrand) and Alasdair R. Young (Georgia Institute of Technology).

== Abstracting and indexing ==
The journal is abstracted and indexed in:

- ABI/INFORM
- CAB Abstracts
- CSA Biological Sciences Database
- CSA Environmental Sciences & Pollution Management Database
- Current Contents/Social & Behavioral Sciences
- EconLit
- International Bibliography of the Social Sciences
- InfoTrac
- International Political Science Abstracts
- Research Papers in Economics
- Scopus
- Social Sciences Citation Index
- Worldwide Political Sciences Abstracts

According to the Journal Citation Reports, the journal has a 2020 impact factor of 3.990, ranking it 29th out of 183 journals in the category "Political Science", 12th out of 95 journals in the category "International Relations" and 64th out of 378 journals in the category "Economics".

== See also ==
- List of political science journals
- List of international relations journals
- List of economics journals
