= Annick Masselot =

Law professor in New Zealand

- Born: 1970 (age 55–56)

Academic background
- Education: University of Canterbury
- Thesis: The emerging childcare strategy in European Union law : the struggle between care, gender equality and the market (2016)
- Doctoral advisor: Martin Holland

Annick Masselot is a New Zealand legal academic, and is a full professor at the University of Canterbury, specialising in labour law, gender equality and work–life balance, European Union law and comparative law. Masselot has been a visiting professor at the universities of Surrey and Cambridge, and is a co-editor of the journal Journal of Common Market Studies.

== Academic career ==
Masselot completed a Magistere de Juriste d’Affaires Européen at the Université de Nancy II, followed by an LLM by research at University College Dublin. She then completed a PhD titled The emerging childcare strategy in European Union law: the struggle between care, gender equality and the market at the University of Canterbury, where she was an International Outgoing Marie Curie Fellow. Her thesis work was supervised by Martin Holland. Masselot joined the faculty of the University of Leeds, where she was Senior Lecturer in European law. She was appointed as full professor of law at the University of Canterbury in 2018, and is part of the multi-disciplinary Institute of Law, Emergencies and Disasters.

Masselot was a visiting professor at the University of Cambridge in 2019. She taught at the University of Surrey gender summer school, where she was hosted by Professor Roberta Guerrina, who co-authored with Masselot "one of the leading articles on the gendered impact of Brexit". She is an editor of the journal Journal of Common Market Studies.

Masselot's research focuses on labour law and gender equality in many areas of the law, such as foreign policy, employment law, work–life balance, and maternity provisions.

== Selected works ==
=== Books ===
- Caracciolo di Torella, Eugenia; Masselot, Annick (2010). Reconciling work and family life in EU law and policy. Palgrave Macmillan. doi:10.1057/9780230246683. ISBN 978-0-230-54305-8.
- Björkdahl, Annika; Chaban, Natalia; Leslie, John; Masselot, Annick, eds. (2015). Importing EU Norms: Conceptual Framework and Empirical Findings. Springer Cham. ISBN 978-3-319-13739-1.

=== Journal articles ===
- Roberta Guerrina; Masselot, Annick (2018). "Walking into the Footprint of EU Law: Unpacking the Gendered Consequences of Brexit". Social Policy and Society. 17 (2): 319–330. doi:10.1017/s1474746417000501. Wikidata Q129964007.
- Masselot, Annick (2007). "The State of Gender Equality Law in the European Union". European Law Journal. 13 (2): 152–168. doi:10.1111/j.1468-0386.2007.00361.x. Wikidata Q130243388.
- Maria Garcia; Masselot, Annick (2015). "EU-Asia Free Trade Agreements as tools for social norm/legislation transfer" (PDF). Asia Europe Journal: intercultural studies in the social sciences and humanities. 13 (3): 241–252. doi:10.1007/s10308-015-0423-0. Wikidata Q129964126.
- Roberta Guerrina; Toni Haastrup; Katharine A.M. Wright; Masselot, Annick; Heather MacRae; Rosalind Cavaghan (2018). "Does European Union studies have a gender problem? Experiences from researching Brexit". International Feminist Journal of Politics. 20 (2): 252–257. doi:10.1080/14616742.2018.1457881. Wikidata Q129764119.
- Masselot, Annick (2004). "The New Equal Treatment Directive: Plus Ça Change …: Comment on Directive 2002/73/EC of 23 September 2002 Amending Council Directive 76/207/EEC on the Implementation of the Principle of Equal Treatment for Men and Women as Regards Access to Employment, Vocational Training and Promotion, and Working Conditions". Feminist Legal Studies. 12 (1): 93–104. doi:10.1023/b:fest.0000026117.71863.56. Wikidata Q129964970.
- Chaban, Natalia; Masselot, Annick; Katharine Vadura (2015). "Introduction. Asia-Europe dialogue on norms: revisiting the role of norm-receivers in the conceptualisation of the 'normative power Europe'" (PDF). Asia Europe Journal: intercultural studies in the social sciences and humanities. 13 (3): 233–239. doi:10.1007/s10308-015-0425-y. Wikidata Q129965170.
