= Andru Isac =

New Zealand High Court justice

The Honourable Andru Isac KC

Judge of the High Court
- Incumbent
- Assumed office 18 January 2021
- Appointed by: David Parker

Personal details
- Education: University of Canterbury LLB (Hons), BA; University of Oxford BCL

Andru Nicolae Isac KC is a New Zealand jurist who serves as a judge of the High Court, sitting in the Wellington High Court.

== Education ==
Isac completed his Bachelor of Arts in Drama and Bachelor of Laws with Honours (First Class) at the University of Canterbury in 1994. In 1998 he earned a Bachelor of Civil Law from the University of Oxford.

== Career ==
Isac started his legal career as a solicitor at Chapman Tripp in Wellington. He later worked as a Crown Prosecutor with Preston Russell in Invercargill. After returning to New Zealand from the UK in 2001. In 2004, he became a litigation partner at Fitzherbert Rowe in Palmerston North. In 2013, Isac joined Gibson Sheat in Wellington as a partner, eventually transitioning to practice as a barrister in sole, focusing on public, commercial, and criminal litigation.

As a barrister, he played a key role in significant cases, such as Ririnui v Landcorp Farming, which contested the legality of a state-owned enterprise's decision to sell land affected by Māori customary interests and a Waitangi Tribunal claim. He also served as counsel assisting the Government Inquiry into Operation Burnham, examining alleged violations of international humanitarian law by the New Zealand Defence Force during its deployment in Afghanistan. In 2018, he was appointed Queen's Counsel, now known as King's Counsel.

He is a contributing author to Todd on Torts authored by Canterbury University professor Stephen Todd, and is the general editor of Cross on Evidence.
