= UACES =

- University Association for Contemporary European Studies
- Formation: 1967
- Legal status: Charitable Incorporated Organisation
- Headquarters: UACES, Canopi, 82 Tanner Street, London SE1 3GN United Kingdom
- Elected Chair: Professor Toni Haastrup
- Website: http://www.uaces.org
- Formerly called: University Association for Contemporary European Studies

UACES is a membership organisation for academics, students and practitioners in all fields of contemporary European studies and the study of the European Union. It is widely known as the editor and disseminator of the Journal on Common Market Studies, a leading peer-reviewed academic journal in the field of European integration studies. Founded in 1967, UACES celebrated its 50th anniversary in 2017.

UACES' Honorary President is Professor Dame Helen Wallace DBE CMG, and its notable patrons include Sir Stephen Wall and Paul Adamson OBE AcSS, amongst others.

== UACES awards ==
UACES has been awarding prizes for contributions to knowledge in the area of contemporary European studies and in association with Reuters prizes for contribution to a critical debate on European integration in English speaking media.
The list of the winners of the UACES awards includes writers and journalists.
