= Mollie Holman =

Australian physiologist (1930–2010)

Mollie Holman AO FAA
- Born: Mollie Elizabeth Holman; 18 June 1930; Launceston, Tasmania, Australia
- Died: 20 August 2010 (aged 80); Surrey Hills, Victoria, Australia
- Education: University of Melbourne; Monash University; University of Oxford
- Scientific career
- Fields: Physiology
- Workplaces: University of Melbourne; Monash University
- Thesis: The effect of ionic environment on the electrical responses of smooth muscle (1957)

Mollie Elizabeth HolmanAO FAA (18 June 1930 – 20 August 2010) was an Australian physiologist whose work focused on muscles and the central nervous system. She was the first woman appointed to the executive board of the Australian Commonwealth Scientific and Industrial Research Organisation Executive in 1975.

== Personal life ==
Mollie Holman was born on 18 June 1930 in Launceston, Tasmania, to William, a physician and radiologist, and Mollie (née Bain). She had three sisters. Her father, supportive of each daughter's intellectual development, supported Mollie's interest in physics.

== Education ==
Holman attended Launceston Church Grammar School. Having moved from Tasmania to Melbourne in 1945, Mollie attended Merton Hall secondary school, graduating in 1949. She completed a Bachelor of Science (BSc) degree at the University of Melbourne in 1952 and a Master of Science (MSc) in 1955. On John Eccles' advice, she then moved to England to undertake studies at the University of Oxford under supervision of Edith Bülbring, which she completed with a doctorate in pharmacology in 1957. She received a Doctor of Science (DSc) from Monash University in the 1960s.

== Working life ==
From 1953 to 1954 Holman was a Demonstrator in pharmacology at the University of Melbourne. Between 1955 and 1957 she went to University of Oxford as a research student on a University of Melbourne travelling scholarship. In the final year at Oxford she was awarded a Wellcome research grant.

After returning to Australia in 1958 she joined the University of Melbourne, as a lecturer in physiology from 1958 to 1962. She moved to Monash University in 1963 as a senior lecturer in physiology. Between 1965 and 1970 she was a reader in physiology. From 1970 to 1996 she was professor. She retired in 1995 and was made Emeritus Professor the following year.

Between 1975 and 1978 she was a Commonwealth Scientific and Industrial Research Organisation (CSIRO) executive member.

== Research ==
Holman's research focused on the complex network of nerve cells that regulate autonomic movements (such as digestion and blood pressure), and how these interact with smooth muscle in the body. In a successful collaboration with Geoff Burnstock, Holman showed how nerves initiated smooth muscle contractions. She often worked late at night to avoid the unwanted vibrations from the rumblings of passing daytime traffic that interfered with her fine electrodes. Holman completed her DPhil degree in 1957 and returned to Australia the following year. Around the same time Burnstock was appointed to the department of zoology, allowing the collaboration to continue. Their work on smooth muscle and its nerve supply was pioneering. A series of papers was published, beginning with a note to Nature in 1960. This brought Holman to the attention of the scientific community.

== Awards and honours ==
- 1965 – Edgeworth David Medal received from the Royal Society of New South Wales
- 1970 – Fellow of the Australian Academy of Science (FAA)
- 1985 - ANZAAS Medal for research into properties of smooth muscles in mammals. She was awarded the medal by Sir Edmund Hilary
- 1998 – Officer of the Order of Australia (AO) "for service to scientific research, particularly relating to the autonomic nervous system and the control of smooth muscle, and to education and university administration".
- 2001 – Centenary Medal "for service to Australian society and science".

== The Mollie Holman Medal ==
Monash University offered for the first time in 1998, up to 10 medals for award to doctoral candidates, normally one from each faculty, who have fulfilled their degree requirements and presented their faculty's best thesis of the year.

=== Notable recipients ===
- Lisa Alexander, Faculty of Science
- Rachelle Buchbinder, Faculty of Medicine, Nursing and Health Science
- David Chesworth, Faculty of Arts, Design and Architecture
- Greer Honeywill, Faculty of Arts, Design and Architecture
- Helen Johnson (artist), Faculty of Arts, Design and Architecture
- Sarah Krasnostein, Faculty of Law
- Adrian Martin, Faculty of Arts, Design and Architecture
- Jared Purton, Faculty of Medicine, Nursing and Health Sciences
- Debra Wilson, New Zealand law professor
- David Wood (mathematician), Faculty of Information Technology

== See also ==
- Bhathal, R. S. (1999). Profiles: Australian Women Scientists. National Library Australia. ISBN 9780642107015.
