= Philip Joseph (academic) =

New Zealand law academic

Philip Joseph KC
- Born: Philip Austin Joseph; 1950 (age 75–76); Christchurch, New Zealand
- Education: University of Canterbury (LL.B. (Hons)) (LL.D.); University of British Columbia (LL.M.)
- Occupation: Professor of Law
- Employer: University of Canterbury Faculty of Law
- Known for: Public Law
- Notable work: Joseph on Constitutional and Administrative Law

Philip Austin Joseph KC is a lawyer and a professor of law at the University of Canterbury in Christchurch, New Zealand. He is the author of Joseph on Constitutional and Administrative Law, a leading authority on public law in New Zealand. He has been described as a leading legal academic with a global reputation on administrative and constitutional law, collectively known as public law.

== Education ==
Professor Joseph's educational background began with an LLB (Hons) from the University of Canterbury in 1973. He continued his studies at the University of British Columbia, where he received an LLM in 1982. He concluded his formal education with a Doctor of Laws (LLD) from the University of Canterbury in 2003.

== Career ==
Joseph was admitted to the bar in 1974, and appointed professor of law in 2001. He has held senior visiting fellowships at the University of Oxford, the University of Cambridge and the University of Melbourne. In 2013 he was the recipient of a Rutherford Scholarship awarded by Trinity College, Cambridge, when he was a visiting fellow at the college.

Philip Joseph served as a consultant at the law firm Russell McVeagh for 17 years. As of 2024, he practices as a barrister sole, focusing on litigation and occasionally representing clients in court. Additionally, he has provided advisory services or served as an expert witness before parliamentary select committees and has offered counsel to various government departments and organisations.

In 2024 he was appointed a King's Counsel. Just a handful of academic KCs exist in New Zealand, the first of whom was another University of Canterbury faculty of law member, John Burrows, in 2005. So it is rare that an academic, like Joseph, became a KC, however this was based solely on legal excellence.
