= Stephen Todd =

New Zealand legal scholar

Stephen Todd FRSNZ
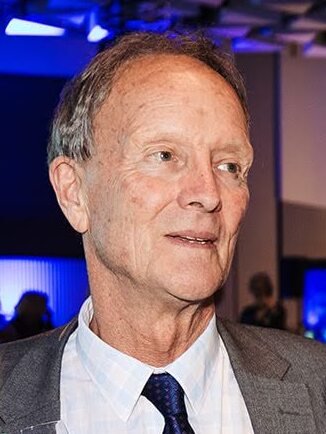
- Todd in 2025
- Education: University of Sheffield (LL.B.) (LL.M.); University of Canterbury (LL.D.)
- Occupation: Professor of Law
- Employer: University of Canterbury Faculty of Law
- Known for: Tort law, accident compensation scheme, and contract law
- Notable work: Todd on Torts (formerly The Law of Torts in New Zealand); The Law of Contract in New Zealand

Stephen Todd is a lawyer and a Professor of Law at the University of Canterbury in Christchurch, New Zealand. In 2022 he was elected a Fellow of the Royal Society Te Apārangi. The society said "Stephen Todd is a highly influential scholar in private law. He is author or part-author of seven books (30 including successive editions) and author of 49 articles and of chapters in 21 books. His work is widely cited and has had exceptional impact in New Zealand courts and in higher courts overseas."

== Education ==
Stephen Todd graduated the University of Sheffield in 1970 with LLB and completed an LLM at Sheffield in 1972. He concluded his formal education with a Doctor of Laws (LLD) from the University of Canterbury in 2002.

== Career ==
Following his qualification as a barrister, he taught at the University of Western Australia before returning to Sheffield. In 1982, he began his tenure as a senior lecturer at the University of Canterbury in New Zealand and eventually advanced to a Professor of Law. From 2004, Todd also holds a fractional position as Professor of Common Law at the University of Nottingham, where he gives lectures generally on pure economic loss and birth torts (wrongful birth, wrongful fertilisation).

He is the general editor and principal author of The Law of Torts in New Zealand, and the joint author with two colleagues of The Law of Contract in New Zealand. Sian Elias, former Chief Justice of New Zealand, remarked about Todd on Torts:

"The best legal writing both sparks the imagination and provides discipline. The Law of Torts in New Zealand is in that mould. It provides insights and analysis for all practising in this field. I expect it to remain the defining work on torts in New Zealand for the next 25 years and to continue to influence the direction of New Zealand law."

His specialisation is New Zealand's accident compensation scheme and its relationship with the common law.

Todd is known by students to sing a number of songs about important torts cases during lectures, including Donoghue v Stevenson. The songs were originally written for the Canterbury University Law Students Society Law Revue. He is known to have a passion for singing, in particular opera. He has authored the book Leading Cases in Song and traditionally brings his lecture series to a culmination by reciting some of the more notable songs within his book.
