= Roberta Guerrina =

British political scientist

- Scientific career
- Fields: Political science
- Institutions: University of Surrey; University of Bristol

Roberta Guerrina is a British political scientist. She is a Professor of Political Science at the University of Bristol. Guerrina studies the gendered effects of public policies and the way that policies are shaped by gendered hierarchies, with a particular focus on European Union policies pertaining to defense and security. She has also written extensively about the effects that Brexit will have on women, about the politics of motherhood, and about European identity.

== Career ==
Since 2019 Guerrina has been a professor of political science at The University of Bristol, where she has also been Director of the Gender Research Centre. Before that, she held the Jean Monnet Chair in EU Gender Politics at the University of Surrey, and was the Director for Equality, Diversity and Inclusion there. Guerrina co-founded the "Gendering EU Studies" research network.

In 2002, Guerrina published the book Europe: History, Ideas and Ideologies. This introductory textbook takes an interdisciplinary approach to European studies. Guerrina describes the historical construction of European identity in terms of how it defines otherness and positions the notion of Europe as a whole in contrast to the rest of the world. The text also treats the question of whether or not a more inclusive pan-European identity could be constructed.

In 2005, Guerrina published Mothering the Union: Gender politics in the EU. Mothering the Union applies a feminist understanding of equality and the relationship between the public and the private to study policies of the European Union throughout the 1990s which relate to motherhood, including Directive 92/85/EEC. This book followed previous studies that Guerrina published on the topic of maternity in the European Union, such as her 2002 article "Mothering in Europe: Feminist Critique of European Policies on Motherhood and Employment" in The European Journal of Women's Studies.

Since Brexit, Guerrina has studied the question of how Brexit will affect women. She has found evidence that the original Brexit referendum had low levels of political participation by women, partly because of a systematic exclusion of women from media narratives in advance of the referendum and also because the framing of Brexit largely excluded major implications of the referendum in areas like social policy that are systematically important to women. As further evidence of this pattern, she also noted that a large number of women Members of Parliament had left politics in response to Brexit. In order to correct this bias and ensure that issues which are systematically important to women were included in the deals that followed Brexit, Guerrina argued that gender would need to be a major part of the Brexit negotiations between the United Kingdom and the European Union.

Guerrina's work on the gendered effects of policies, particularly the consequences of Brexit for women, have been cited in media outlets like The New York Times, Cosmopolitan, and France 24.

== Selected works ==
- Europe: History, ideas and ideologies (2002)
- "Mothering in Europe: Feminist Critique of European Policies on Motherhood and Employment", European Journal of Women's Studies (2002)
- Mothering the Union: Gender politics in the EU (2010)
