= Elizabeth Toomey =

New Zealand law academic

- Born: 1951 (age 74–75)
- Education: University of Canterbury
- Scientific career
- Fields: Real estate law, disaster recovery law
- Workplaces: University of Canterbury

Elizabeth Toomey (born 1951) is a New Zealand law academic. She is currently a full professor at the University of Canterbury.

== Education ==
Toomey completed her undergraduate studies at the University of Otago, followed by an LLM at the University of Canterbury.

== Career ==
Toomey joined the faculty at University of Canterbury. Toomey's research interests include real property / real estate, several aspects related to the 2010 Canterbury earthquake and commercial law. She is a member of the Legal Aid Review Panel. Along with Jeremy Finn she got funding from the New Zealand Law Foundation to study the legal implications of disasters, which resulted in a book 'Legal Response to Natural Disasters' and select committee submissions.

== Selected works ==
- Toomey, Elizabeth. "The slow road to recovery: a city rebuilds under the Canterbury Earthquake Recovery Act 2011." In Asia-Pacific Disaster Management, pp. 217–243. Springer, Berlin, Heidelberg, 2014.
- Taylor, Lynne, Ursula Cheer, Debra Wilson, Elizabeth Toomey, and Sascha Mueller. "Improving the Effectiveness of Large Class Teaching in Law Degrees." New Zealand Law Review 2013, no. 1 (2013): 100–135.
- Toomey, Elizabeth. "The recovery phase in post-earthquake Christchurch, New Zealand." In Community-Based Reconstruction of Society, pp. 23–30. Springer, Singapore, 2017.
- Toomey, Elizabeth. "Trans-Tasman Sporting Leagues: Governance and Integration." Canterbury L. Rev. 18 (2012): 63.
- Toomey, Elizabeth. "Public participation in resource management: The New Zealand experience." NZJ Envtl. L. 16 (2012): 117.
