= Karen Scott =

New Zealand academic

Karen Nadine Scott
- Education: University of Nottingham, University of Canterbury
- Scientific career
- Fields: antarctic law, law of the sea, environmental law and international trade law
- Workplaces: University of Nottingham, University of Canterbury

Karen Nadine Scott is a New Zealand Law academic and a full professor at the University of Canterbury. In June 2019, she was elected President of the Australian and New Zealand Society of International Law.

== Academic career ==
After completing her LLB and LLM degrees at the University of Nottingham, she lectured there before moving to the University of Canterbury, where she became a full professor and head of school. The University of Canterbury was the first law school to have a female dean (Ursula Cheer) and head of school (Scott).

Scott's research interests encompass Antarctic law, the law of the sea, environmental law and international trade law.

== Selected works ==
- Rothwell, Donald, Alex G. Oude Elferink, Karen N. Scott, and Tim Stephens, eds. The Oxford handbook of the law of the sea. Oxford Handbooks in Law, 2015.
- Hemmings, Alan D., Donald R. Rothwell, and Karen N. Scott, eds. Antarctic security in the twenty-first century: legal and policy perspectives. Routledge, 2012.
- Scott, Karen N. "International law in the anthropocene: responding to the geoengineering challenge." Michigan Journal of International Law 34 (2012): 309.
- Scott, Karen N. "International regulation of undersea noise." International & Comparative Law Quarterly 53, no. 2 (2004): 287–323.
- Scott, Karen N. "Tilting at offshore windmills: regulating wind farm development within the renewable energy zone." Journal of Environmental Law 18, no. 1 (2005): 89–118.
