= University of Otago Faculty of Law =

- Te Kaupeka Tātai Ture (Māori)
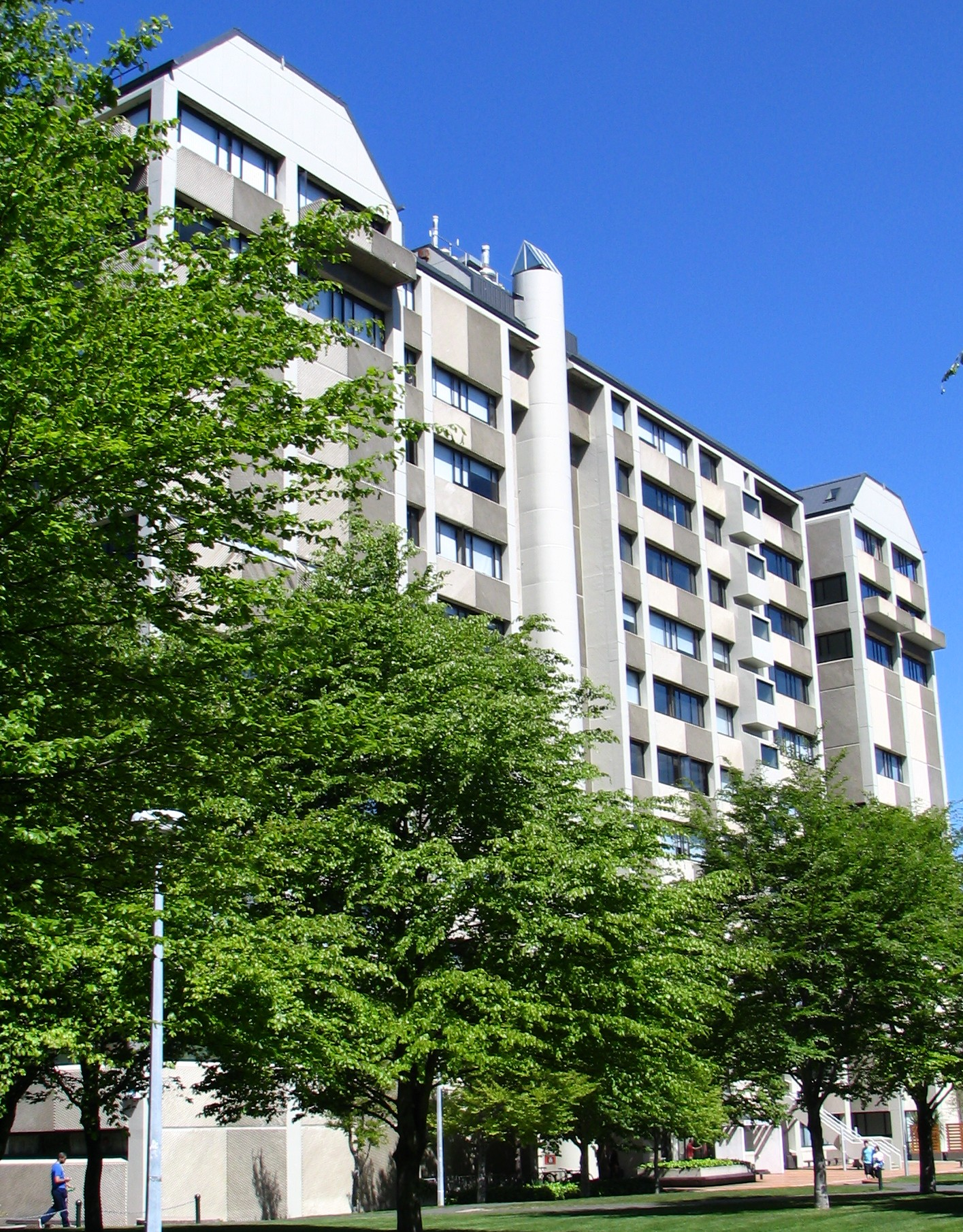
- Richardson Building in 2008
- Type: Public Law school
- Established: 1873; 152 years ago
- Parent institution: University of Otago
- Accreditation: New Zealand Law Society
- Dean: Bridgette Toy-Cronin
- Location: Dunedin, New Zealand
- Website: otago.ac.nz/law

The Otago Faculty of Law (Māori: Te Kaupeka Tātai Ture) is one of the professional schools at the University of Otago. Otago is New Zealand's oldest law school, with lectures in law having begun in 1873. The Faculty of Law is currently located in the Richardson Building at Otago's main campus in the city of Dunedin.

The Faculty of Law awards the degrees of Bachelor of Laws (LL.B.), Master of Laws (LL.M.), and Doctor of Philosophy (Ph.D.). A Bachelor of Laws Honours programme also exists and is reserved for approximately the top 10% of LL.B. students. In 2007, the law faculty had approximately 800 equivalent full-time students. Approximately 200 students are in each of second, third, and fourth-year law, and over 700 students are enrolled in the first-year LAWS 101 course, which is a prerequisite to being admitted into full-time legal studies as a second year law student. Approximately 60% of the law students are female.

The first law lecturer at Otago was Sir Robert Stout. He went on to serve as attorney-general, prime minister, and Chief Justice of New Zealand. Otago's law library is named the Robert Stout Law Library.

Bridgette Toy-Cronin is the current dean of the Faculty of Law. The faculty is composed of 28 academic staff members, with 8 full professors, 8 associate professors, 8 senior lecturers and 4 lecturers.
