= Oxford University Liberal Club =

The Oxford University Liberal Club (OULC) was a student political club at the University of Oxford from 1913 to 1987. Initially formed from clubs called the Russell Club and the Palmerston Club, in its early years it also occupied premises in Oxford and acted as a gentlemen's club.

In 1987, in advance of the merger of the Liberals and Social Democrats to create the Liberal Democrats nationally, the Club merged with the Oxford University Social Democrats to form the Oxford University Liberal Democrats.

== History ==
OULC was founded in 1913, stating is aim as being "to rally progressive members of the University to the support of Liberal principles". It was formed from a merger of two older Liberal clubs at Oxford, the Russell Club and the Palmerston Club, both of which dated to at least the 1870s and had as their goals the promotion of liberal politics. This makes OULC arguably the oldest political club founded at an English university.

Also existing in the early 1900s was a political society called the 'Liberal League', founded "in defence of free trade".

An early member was J. B. S. Haldane, who joined the club and became active in its debates.

At first occupying upstairs club rooms on the corner of Cornmarket Street and George Street, which were open to members for most of the day, OULC was modelled on the usual pattern of gentlemen's clubs of the day, before the arrival of the First World War and the general reduction in the number of students in residence at Oxford. The club faced problems in the 1920s, as around half of its members defected and joined the Oxford University Labour Club, established in 1919, or the New Reform Club, a pro-Lloyd George group, reflecting the division of the national Liberal Party at the time. Despite this, Lloyd George was honorary president of OULC in the 1920s and 1930s and was then widely seen in Oxford as a hero of liberalism.

Michael Foot was president of the club while at Oxford.

In Hilary term 1935, Frank Byers was President of OULC, Harold Wilson Treasurer, and Raymond Walton Secretary. They made efforts to make membership more attractive, including the creation of a newspaper and a club library, and membership trebled to over 300. It continued to grow during and after the Second World War, with a peak of over a thousand members reached in 1950 under the Presidency of Jeremy Thorpe. However, by this point OULC had become more of a social club than a political one, with its activities including dinners, parties, dances, and even balls.

Political upheavals in the late 1970s, and then the emergence of the Oxford University Social Democrats in 1981, led to a fall in the number of OULC members. In 1987, the two merged, but some of the social functions from the heyday of the Liberal Club were continued.
