= Toni Haastrup =

Political researcher and academic

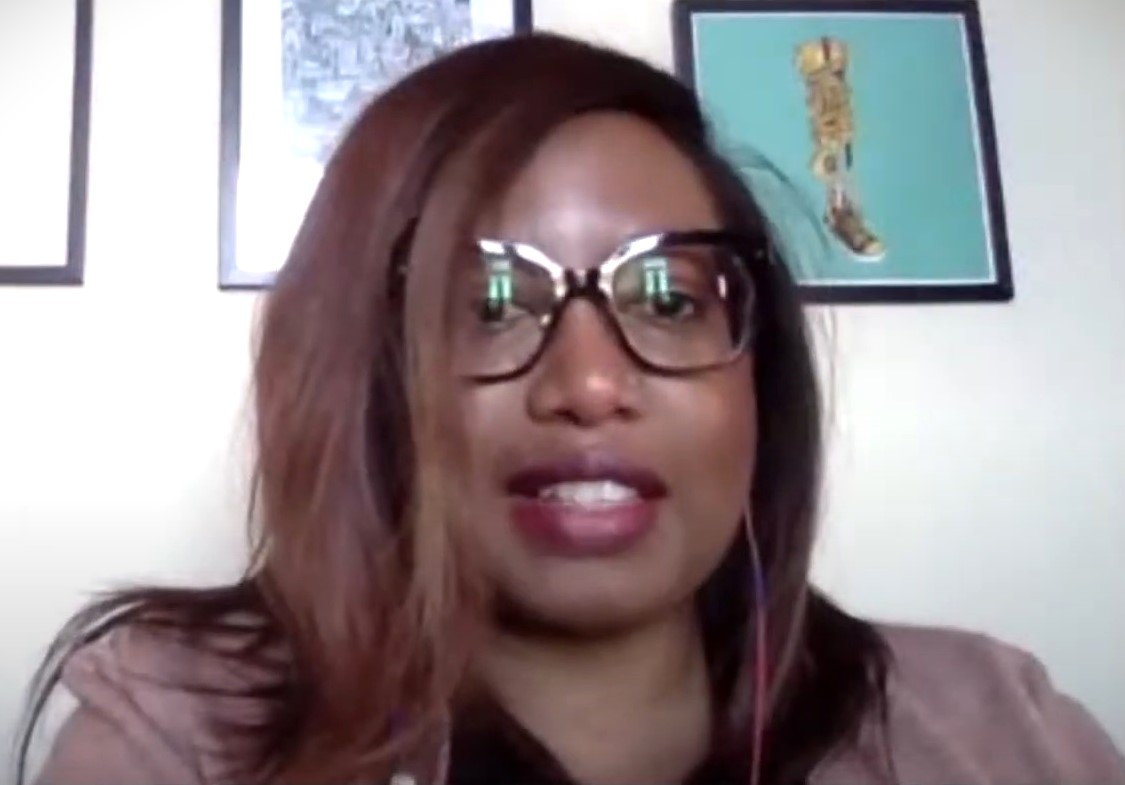
- Haastrup in 2022
- Education: University of Edinburgh; University of Cape Town; University of California, Davis
- Scientific career
- Workplaces: University of Kent; University of Stirling; University of Manchester
- Thesis: Security as change? : an institutional view of contemporary EU-Africa relations

Toni Haastrup is a social scientist with expertise in global politics. She is a Professor, & Chair in Global Politics at the University of Manchester. Her research interrogates the manifestation of power hierarchies in global politics, with research interests encompassing a wide range of themes, including peace and security in Africa, feminist, postcolonial and decolonial approaches to international relations, and regional and global governance – she has published extensively in these areas. In addition to her academic work, Toni Haastrup frequently works with government mechanisms and international organisations, offering expertise on themes linked to Europe's engagement in Africa; the Women, Peace and Security (WPS) agenda and Feminist Foreign Policy (FFP). She was awarded the 2022 Flax Foundation's Emma Goldman Award for her work on feminist and inequality issues in Europe.

== Early life and education ==
Haastrup was an undergraduate student at the University of California, Davis. She moved to the University of Cape Town for her graduate degree. Eventually, Haastrup joined the University of Edinburgh for her doctoral research, where she investigated contemporary EU-Africa relations.

== Research career ==
In addition to examining the contemporary practices of Europe's engagement in Africa, through relations between the European Union and regional organisations on the continent, Haastrup's research has focused on the practices of the Women, Peace, and Security agenda extensively. The WPS framework is the result of years of feminist campaigning, and looks to achieve gender justice by strengthening the participation for women in global peace and security, amongst other concerns. In 2019 Haastrup joined the University of Stirling, prior to which she was at the University of Kent. Her more recent research critically evaluates the construction and deployment of feminist foreign policies in global policymaking.

In 2022, the Flax Foundation awarded Haastrup the Emma Goldman Award for her work on feminist and inequality issues. In September 2023, she joined the University of Manchester and will commence her Independent Social Research Foundation (ISRF) Fellowship, which seeks to theorise peace through a Pan-Africanist Feminist lens.

== Select publications ==
- Toni Haastrup (November 2013). "EU as Mentor? Promoting Regionalism as External Relations Practice in EU–Africa Relations". Revue d'integration Europeenne. 35 (7): 785–800. doi:10.1080/07036337.2012.744754. ISSN 0703-6337. Wikidata Q57819983.
- Haastrup, Toni (2013), "Evaluating a Contemporary Institution: EU-Africa Relations", Charting Transformation through Security, London: Palgrave Macmillan UK, pp. 31–60, doi:10.1057/9781137315496_2, ISBN 978-1-349-34912-8
- Haastrup, Toni; Hagen, Jamie J. (2020-06-12), "Global Racial Hierarchies and the Limits of Localization via National Action Plans", New Directions in Women, Peace and Security, Policy Press, pp. 133–152, doi:10.1332/policypress/9781529207743.003.0009, ISBN 9781529207743
