= Ursula Cheer =

English-New Zealand law academic

- Other name: Ursula Jan Cheer
- Education: University of Canterbury
- Scientific career
- Workplaces: Justice Department, Office of the Prime Minister, Law Commission, University of Canterbury
- Thesis: Reality and Myth: The New Zealand Media and the Chilling Effect of Defamation Law (2008)
- Website: www.canterbury.ac.nz/business-and-law/contact-us/people/ursula-cheer.html

Ursula Jan Cheer is a New Zealand law academic. As of 2018, she is a full professor at the University of Canterbury.

== Academic career ==
After growing up in Christchurch, New Zealand and doing an undergraduate at University of Canterbury and practising privately, Cheer worked in government in Wellington, first at the Justice Department and then the Office of the Prime Minister. She then moved to London to work at the Law Commission, before returning to the University of Canterbury as a full professor, and later Dean.

Cheer's research interests focus on media law and chilling effects. She appears frequently in the media on these topics.

In 1990, Cheer was awarded the New Zealand 1990 Commemoration Medal.

== Selected works ==
- Burrows, John Frederick, and Ursula Cheer. Media Law in New Zealand. Oxford University Press, 2005.
- Cheer, Ursula. "Myths and Realities about the Chilling Effect: The New Zealand Media’s Experience of Defamation Law’(2005)." Torts Law Journal 13: 259.
- Cheer, Ursula "New Zealand media law update. Recent developments–defamation, censorship and contempt." Media and Arts Law Review 9, no. 3 (2004): 237–246.
- Taylor, Lynne, Ursula Cheer, Debra Wilson, Elizabeth Toomey, and Sascha Mueller. "Improving the Effectiveness of Large Class Teaching in Law Degrees." New Zealand Law Review 2013, no. 1 (2013): 100–135.
- Cheer, Ursula. "Defamation in New Zealand and Its Effects on the Media-Self-Censorship or Occupational Hazard." New Zealand Law Review (2006): 467.
