= Economy of New Zealand =

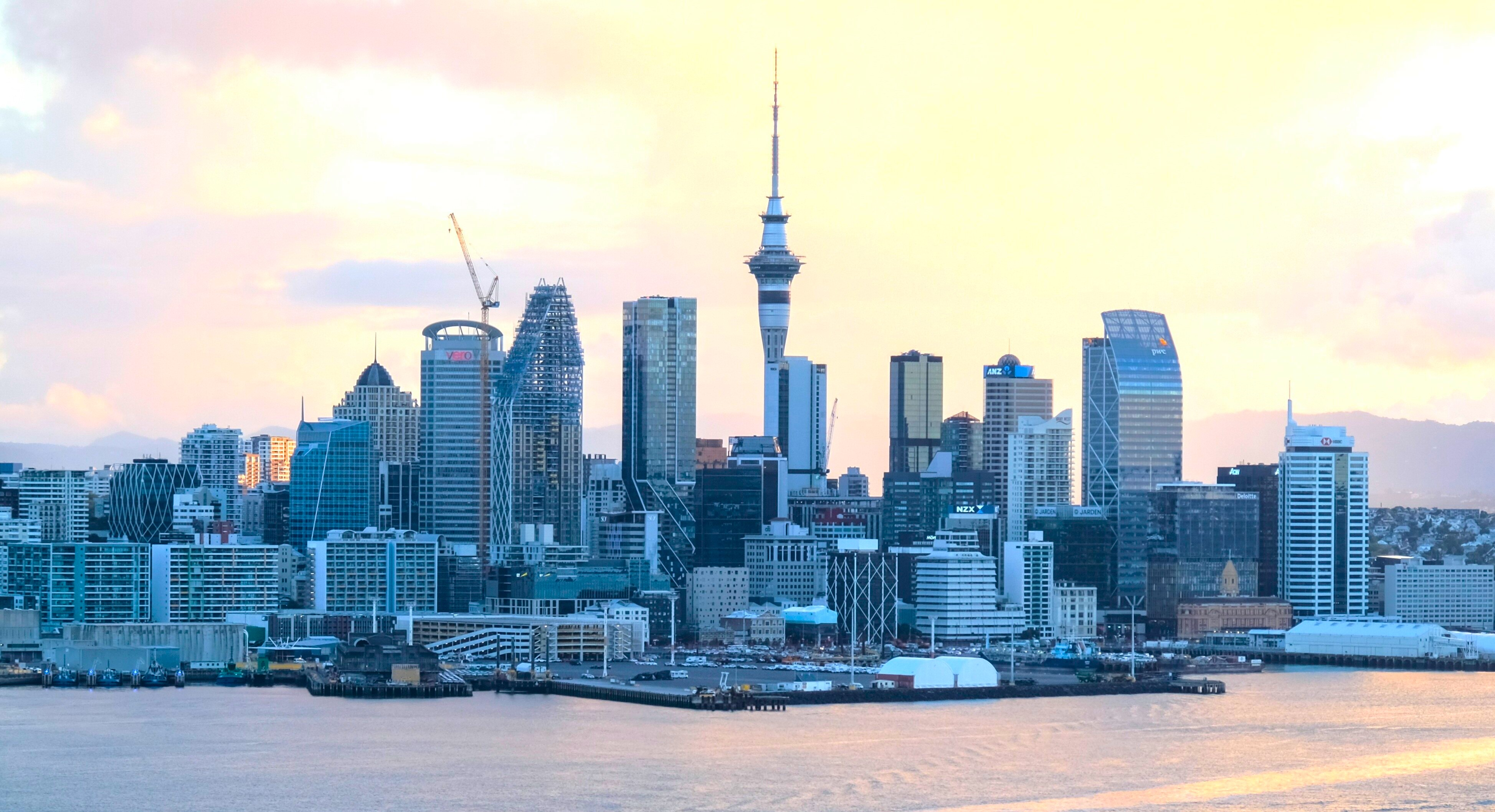
- Auckland's central business district
- Currency: New Zealand dollar (NZD, NZ$)
- Fiscal year: 1 July – 30 June
- Trade organisations: APEC, CPTPP, RCEP, WTO and OECD
- Country group: Advanced economy; High-income economy

Statistics
- Population: ▲5,324,700 (June 2025 estimate)
- GDP: ▼$248.67 billion (nominal; 2025); ▲$298.93 billion (PPP; 2025)
- GDP rank: 52nd (nominal; 2025); 67th (PPP; 2025)
- GDP growth: 0.5% (2024); 1.4% (2025)
- GDP per capita: ▼$46,130 (nominal; 2025); ▲$55,450 (PPP; 2025)
- GDP per capita rank: 23rd (nominal; 2025); 36th (PPP; 2025)
- GDP per capita growth: -0.4% (2025)
- GDP by sector: Agriculture: 7%; Industry: 19%; Services: 65%; (2018)
- Inflation (CPI): 2.2% (September 2024 Q)
- Population below national poverty line: 11.0% (relative, 2014)
- Gini coefficient: 33.9 medium (2019)
- Human Development Index: ▲0.939 very high (2022) (16th); ▼0.856 very high IHDI (17th) (2022)
- Labour force: ▲2.820 million (Q2 2022); ▼68.5% employment rate (Q2 2022); ▼70.8% labour force participation rate (Q2 2022)
- Labour force by occupation: Agriculture: 6.6%; Industry: 20.7%; Services: 72.7%; (2017 est.)
- Unemployment: ▲5.6% (Q2 2026); 171 thousand unemployed (Q2 2026)
- Youth unemployment: ▲15.6% (2025)
- Average gross salary: NZ$6,668 / $3,934 monthly (2024)
- Average net salary: NZ$5,283 / $3,116 monthly (2024)
- Main industries: Food processing, agriculture, forestry, wool, tourism, financial services

External
- Exports: $72.8 billion (FY 2022/23)
- Export goods: Dairy products, meat, logs and wood products, fruit, wine, machinery and equipment, fish and seafood
- Main export partners: China 28.2%; Australia 12.6%; United States 11.3%; European Union 6.4%; Japan 5.7%; (FY 2022/3)
- Imports: $88.8 billion (FY 2022/23)
- Import goods: Petroleum, vehicles, machinery and equipment, electronics, textiles, plastics
- Main import partners: China 21.6%; European Union 14.7%; Australia 10.8%; United States 9.4%; South Korea 7.1%; (FY 2022/23)
- FDI stock: ▲$84.19 billion (31 December 2017 est.); Abroad: ▼$16.74 billion (31 December 2016 est.)
- Current account: ▼ −$5.471 billion (2017 est.)
- Gross external debt: NZ$156.181 billion (53% of GDP) (December 2018) NZ$86.342 billion (30.5% of GDP) (Feb 2018)

Public finance
- Government debt: ▼31.7% of GDP (2017 est.)
- Foreign reserves: ▼$10.02 billion (June 2023 est.)
- Budget balance: +1.6% (of GDP) (2017 est.)
- Revenue: 74.11 billion (2017 est.)
- Spending: 70.97 billion (2017 est.)
- Economic aid: As donor: $99.7 million (FY99/00)
- Credit rating: Standard & Poor's: AAA (Domestic); AA+ (Foreign); AAA (T&C assessment); Outlook: Negative; Moody's: AAA; Outlook: Stable; Fitch: AA+; Outlook: Negative
- All values, unless otherwise stated, are in US dollars.

New Zealand has a highly developed free-market economy. As of 2025, New Zealand's nominal GDP was US$248 billion. In the 2025 IMF rankings New Zealand was the 52nd-largest national economy in the world when measured by nominal gross domestic product (GDP) and the 63rd-largest in the world when measured by purchasing power parity (PPP). New Zealand has one of the most globalised economies and depends greatly on international trade, mainly with China, Australia, the European Union, the United Kingdom, the United States, Japan and Korea. New Zealand's 1983 Closer Economic Relations agreement with Australia means that the economy aligns closely with that of Australia. Among OECD nations, New Zealand has a highly efficient and strong social security system; social expenditure stood at roughly 19.4% of GDP.

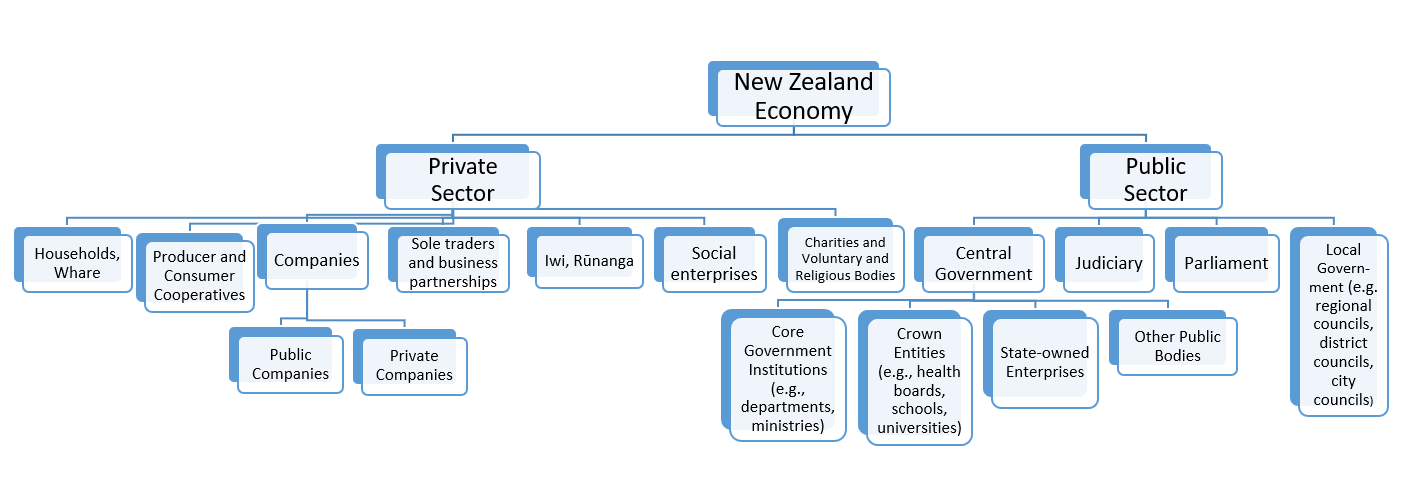
Economy of New Zealand by sector and organisation type

New Zealand's diverse economy is made up of various types of informal and formal organisations, divided between the public and private sectors. It has a sizeable service sector, accounting for 73% of all GDP activity as of 2024. As a large island nation New Zealand has abundant natural resources and mineral wealth. Prominent manufacturing industries include aluminium production, food processing, metal fabrication, wood and paper products. Goods-producing industries accounted for 20% of GDP as of 2024. The primary sector continues to dominate New Zealand's exports, despite accounting for only 7% of GDP as of 2024. The information technology sector is growing rapidly.

The major capital market is the New Zealand Exchange (NZX). As of February 2023, NZX had a total of 338 listed securities, equity, debt and funds with a combined market capitalisation of NZD $226 billion. New Zealand's currency, the New Zealand dollar, also circulates in four Pacific Island territories. The New Zealand dollar is the 10th-most traded currency in the world.

== History ==
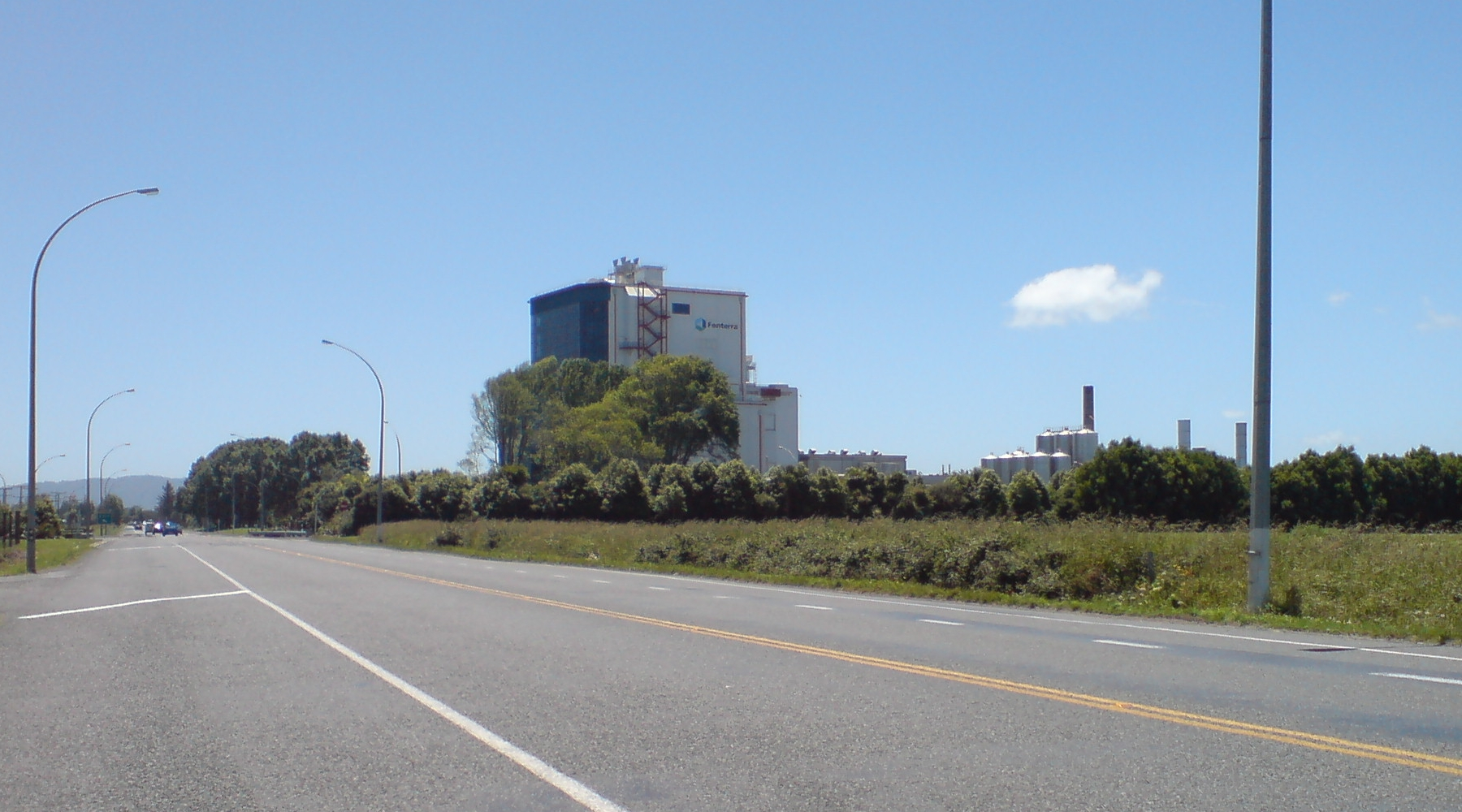
Agriculture (especially dairy farming – such as for the Fonterra plant shown) is a major export earner.

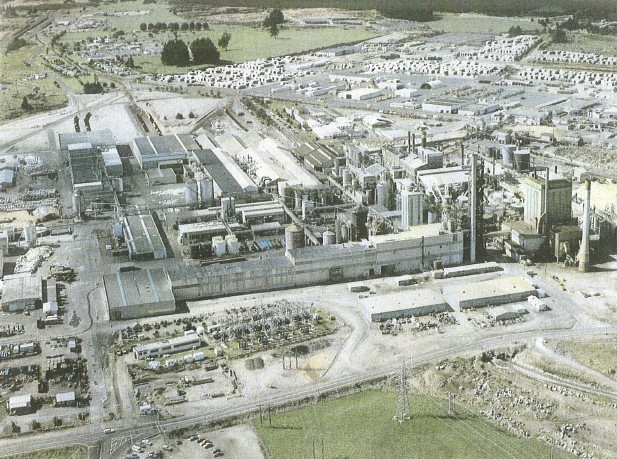
An aerial view of the Kinleith Mill. Forestry exports are an important component of New Zealand's economy.

For many years New Zealand's economy was built on a narrow range of agricultural products, such as wool, meat and dairy. These products became New Zealand's staple and most valuable exports, underpinning the success of the economy, from the 1850s until the 1970s. For example, from 1920 to the late 1930s, the dairy export quota was usually around 35% of New Zealand's total exports, and in some years made up almost 45%. Due to the high demand for these primary products, manifested by the New Zealand wool boom of 1951, New Zealand had one of the highest standards of living in the world for 70 years.

In the 1960s, prices for these traditional exports declined, and in 1973 New Zealand lost its preferential trading position with the United Kingdom when the latter joined the European Economic Community. Partly as a result, from 1970 to 1990, the relative New Zealand GDP per capita adjusted for purchasing power declined from about 115% of the OECD average to 80%.

Between 1984 and 1993, New Zealand changed from a somewhat closed and centrally controlled economy to one of the most open economies in the OECD. In a process often referred to in New Zealand as Rogernomics, successive governments introduced policies which dramatically liberalised the economy.

In 2005, the World Bank praised New Zealand as the most business-friendly country in the world. The economy diversified and by 2008, tourism had become the single biggest generator of foreign exchange.

=== Early years ===
Prior to European settlement and colonisation of New Zealand, Māori had a subsistence economy, the basic economic unit of which was the sub-tribe or hapū in which labour was divided. From the 1790s, the waters around New Zealand were visited by British, French and American whaling, sealing and trading ships. Their crews traded European goods, including guns and metal tools, for Māori food, water, wood, flax and sex. Their increasing lawlessness and plans for formal settlement by the New Zealand Company were two of the drivers behind the signing of the Treaty of Waitangi in 1840, which established New Zealand as a colony. Settlers continued to be dependent on Māori for food until the 1860s. From then immigrants became self-sufficient in farming, and started quarrying a variety of minerals including gold, which was discovered at Gabriel's Gully in Central Otago, leading to the Otago gold rush in 1861. Settlements flourished in areas where these quarries were established. In the 1880s, Dunedin became the richest city in the country largely on the back of investments from the gold rush.

Sheep farming began in the Wairarapa but soon spread up and down the east coast from Southland to the East Cape once rudimentary roads and transport became available. Much of the land used for farming was taken or leased from Māori. Sheep numbers grew quickly and by the mid-1850s, there were already a million sheep in New Zealand; by the early 1870s, there were 10 million. Wool became the first staple export, initially exported from the Wellington settlement in the late 1850s, although unrefrigerated meat and dairy products were exported as far as Australia.

In the 1870s, Julius Vogel was periodically both colonial treasurer and premier. He viewed New Zealand as a "Britain of the South Seas" and began the development of infrastructure in New Zealand investing heavily in roads, railways, telegraphs and bridges funded by public borrowing. Progress slowed after the collapse of the City of Glasgow Bank in 1878 which led to a contraction in credit from London, the centre of the world's financial system at the time. Economic activity was depressed for some years afterwards, until refrigeration was introduced in 1882. This enabled New Zealand to start exporting meat and other frozen products to the United Kingdom. Refrigeration transformed and shaped the development of the economy but, in the process, established New Zealand's economic dependence on Britain.

The success of refrigeration was directly related to the growth and development of farming in the country. In the 19th century, the bulk of economic activity was in the South Island of New Zealand. From around 1900, dairy farming became increasingly viable in areas which were less suitable for sheep, particularly in Northland, the Waikato and Taranaki. As dairying developed, the North Island slowly became more important to the economy. Britain became the sole market for meat and animal products in New Zealand, owing to the increase in its land cultivation and farming. The dairy farming can therefore be seen as a response to the powerful market demands in Europe, transforming not only New Zealand's countryside, economy and production techniques, but also causing migration in order to create the needed supply of dairy farming.

=== 20th century ===
The Reserve Bank of New Zealand was established as New Zealand's central bank on 1 August 1934. Up until that time New Zealand's monetary policy had been set in the United Kingdom, and the New Zealand Pound was issued by private banks. A separate central bank gave New Zealand's government control of monetary policy for the first time, although New Zealand remained part of the sterling area by pegging its pound to the British pound sterling until the introduction of the New Zealand dollar in 1967, after which the dollar was instead pegged to the United States dollar, before being floated in 1985.

By the mid-20th century, pastoral-farming products made up more than 90% of New Zealand's exports, 65% of which was going to Britain in the 1950s. As a former colony, the United Kingdom provided New Zealand with preferential trade quotas. This also enabled New Zealand to impose high tariffs on imported goods from other countries. Tough import controls gave local manufacturers the ability to produce similar products locally, broaden the base of jobs available in New Zealand and still compete against higher priced imports.

This prosperity continued up to 1955 at which point Britain started phasing out preferential quotas. From then on, what New Zealand received was dictated by the free market. As a result, during the 1950s and 1960s the country's standard of living began to slip as the export sector was no longer able to pay for the level of imported goods required to meet the country's growing consumerism.

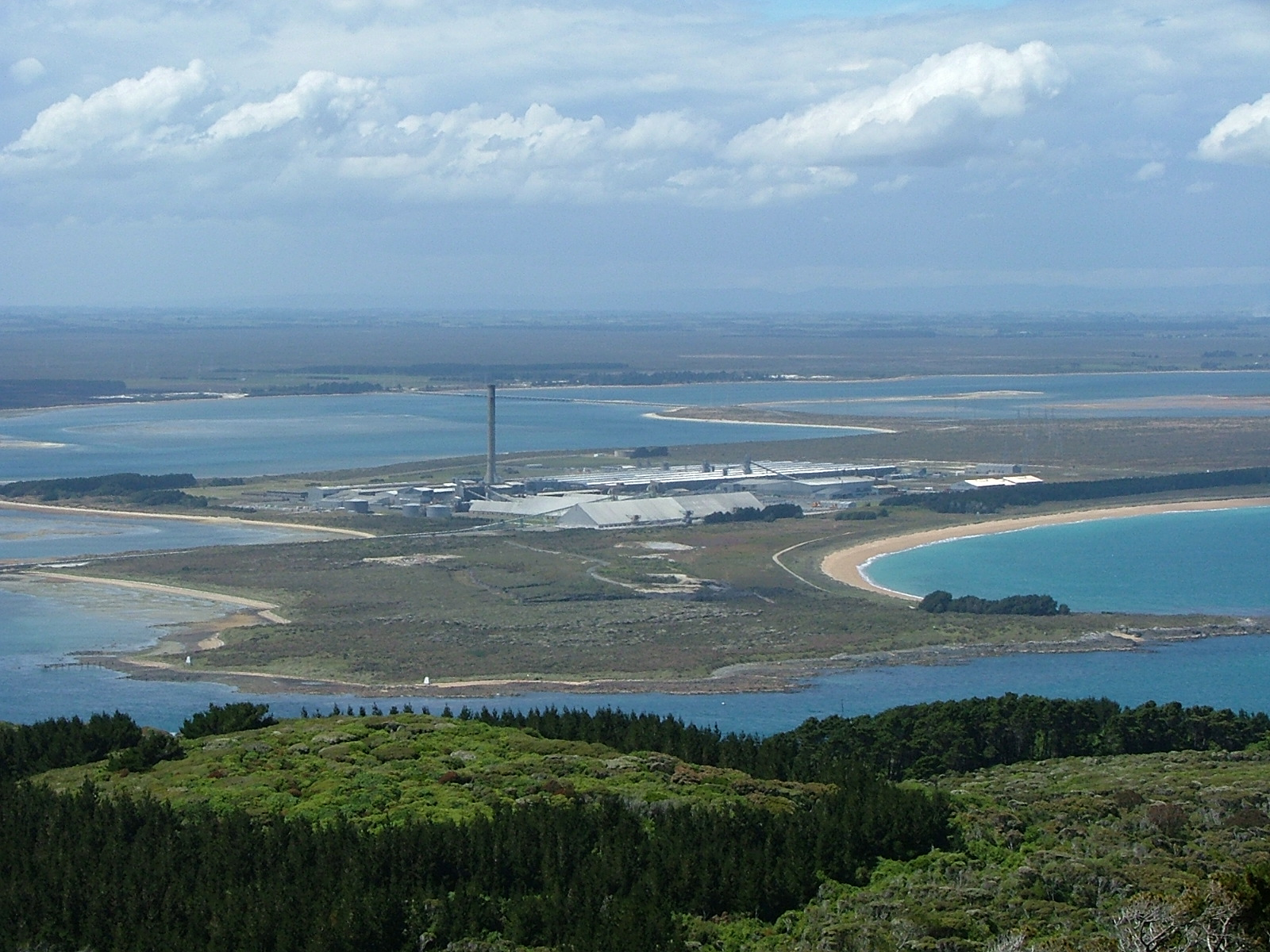
Tiwai Point Aluminium Smelter, opened in 1971

Britain applied to join the European Economic Community (EEC) in 1961, but was vetoed by the French. The government of Keith Holyoake reacted by attempting to diversify New Zealand's export markets, signing the first free trade agreement (Australia New Zealand Free Trade Agreement) in 1965, and opening new diplomatic posts in Hong Kong, Jakarta, Saigon, Los Angeles and San Francisco. Britain applied again to join the EEC in 1967, and entered into negotiations for membership in 1970. Holyoake's deputy and successor, Jack Marshall, (briefly Prime Minister in 1972) negotiated continued access for New Zealand exports to the United Kingdom under the so-called "Luxembourg Agreement".

Britain gained full membership of the EEC on 1 January 1973, and all trade agreements with New Zealand came to an end, except the Luxembourg Agreement. By the end of that year, only 26.8% of New Zealand's exports were to Britain. This had a significant effect on the standard of living. In 1953, New Zealand had the third highest standard in the world. By 1978, it had dropped to 22nd place.

Having lost unrestricted access to its traditional market, New Zealand continued to search for alternative export markets and diversify its economy. The Government of Norman Kirk, who succeeded Marshall, put greater emphasis on expanding New Zealand's trade, especially with South East Asia. Following the Yom Kippur War in October 1973, an oil embargo was put in place by the Middle Eastern oil exporters, leading to the 1973 oil crisis. This compounded New Zealand's dire economic situation further. Inflation greatly increased as the cost of transport and imported goods soared, causing standards of living to decline.

==== Think Big ====
Following the 1979 energy crisis resulting from the Iranian Revolution of that year, Robert Muldoon, the prime minister between 1975 and 1984, instituted an economic strategy known as Think Big. Large scale industrial plants were established based on New Zealand's abundant natural gas. A new range of products for export such as ammonia, urea fertiliser, methanol and petrol were produced and with greater use of electricity (with the electrification of the North Island Main Trunk railway) with the goal that this would reduce New Zealand's dependence on oil imports.

Other projects included the Clyde Dam on the Clutha River, which was built to meet a growing demand for electricity, and the expansion of the New Zealand Steel plant at Glenbrook.

The Tiwai Point Aluminium Smelter, which opened in 1971, was also upgraded as part of the Think Big strategy and now brings in approximately NZ$1 billion in exports every year.

Most of these projects turned out to be ill-timed as they came on line at the same time as oil prices dropped during the 1980s oil glut. The price of crude went from more than US$90 a barrel in 1980, to about US$30 a few years later. Because these Think Big projects required massive borrowing to get started, public debt soared from $4.2 billion in 1975 when Muldoon became prime minister to $21.9 billion when he left office nine years later. Inflation remained rampant, averaging 11% in the 1980s. Once Labour came to power in 1984, many of these projects were sold to private industry as part of a wider sale of state-assets.

The Muldoon Government did, however, make some moves towards deregulation. For example, in 1982 it removed the transport licensing restrictions on road carriers carting goods more than 150 km, and turned the Railways Department into a statutory corporation.

==== Rogernomics ====
Between 1984 and 1993, New Zealand underwent radical economic reform, moving from what had probably been the most protected, regulated and state-dominated system of any capitalist democracy to an extreme position at the open, competitive, free-market end of the spectrum.

The Fourth Labour government, elected in July 1984, moved away from government intervention in the economy and allowed free market mechanisms to dominate. These reforms became known as "Rogernomics", named after minister of finance from 1984 to 1988, Roger Douglas. The changes included making the Reserve Bank independent of political decisions; performance contracts for senior civil servants; public sector finance reform based on accrual accounting; tax neutrality; subsidy-free agriculture; and industry-neutral competition regulation. Government subsidies including agricultural subsidies were eliminated; import regulations were loosened up; the exchange rate was floated; and controls on interest rates, wages, and prices were removed; and personal rates of taxation were reduced. Tight monetary policy and major efforts to reduce the government budget deficit brought the inflation rate down from an annual rate of more than 18% in 1987. The deregulation of government-owned enterprises in the 1980s and 1990s reduced government's role in the economy and permitted the retirement of some public debt.

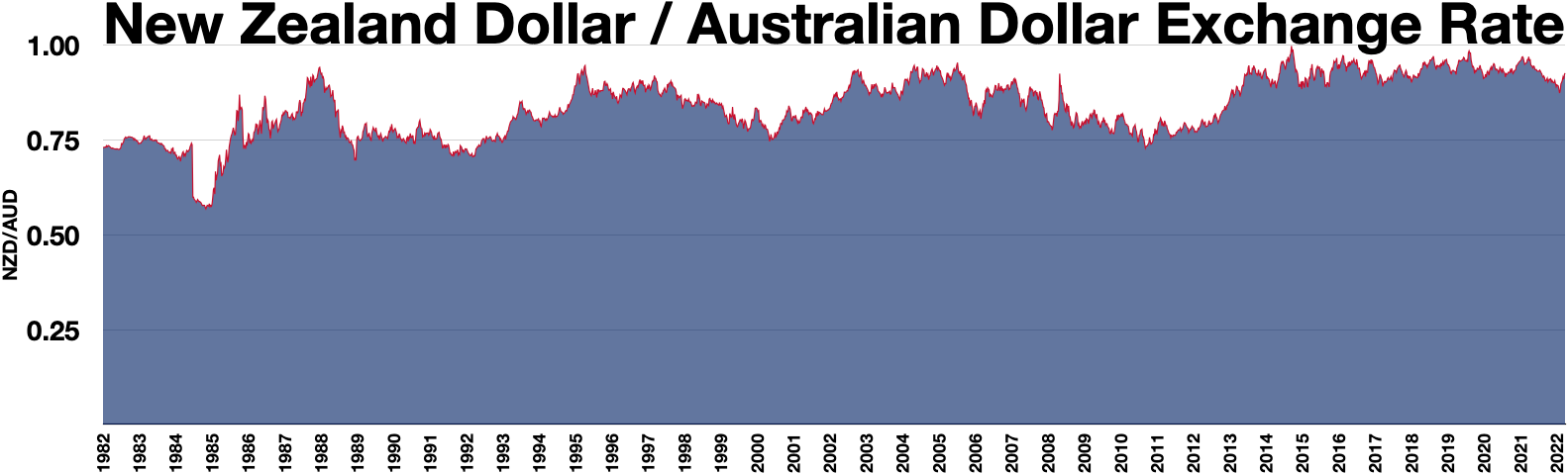
New Zealand Dollar / Australian Dollar exchange rate

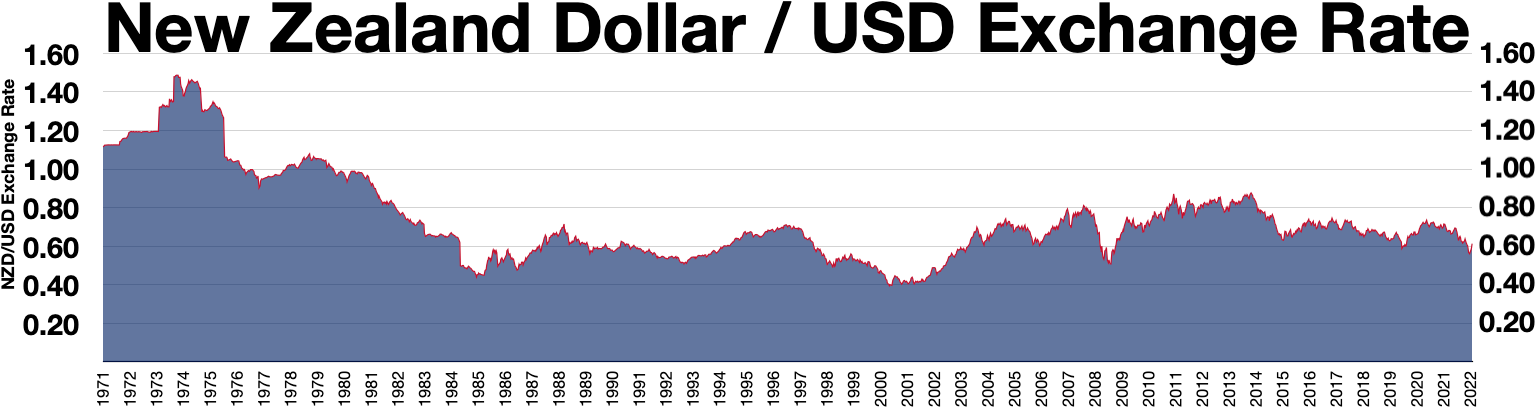
NZD / USD exchange rate

The new Government was faced with an exchange rate crisis the day after it was elected. Speculators expected the change of government to result in a 20% devaluation of the New Zealand dollar, which led to the 1984 New Zealand constitutional crisis due to Muldoon's refusal to devalue, worsening the currency crisis further. As a result, the dollar was floated on 4 March 1985, allowing for the value of the dollar to change with the market. Prior to the dollar being floated, the dollar was pegged against a basket of currencies.

Financial markets were deregulated and tariffs on imported goods lowered and phased out. At the same time subsidies to many industries, notably agriculture, were removed or significantly reduced. Income and company taxes were reduced and the top marginal tax rate was reduced from 66% to 33%. These were replaced by a comprehensive tax on goods and services (GST) initially set at 10%, then increased to 12.5% in 1989 and to 15% in 2010. A surtax on universal superannuation was also introduced. Many government departments were corporatised, and from 1 April 1987 became State owned enterprises, required to make a profit. The new corporations shed thousands of jobs adding to unemployment; Electricity Corporation 3,000; Coal Corporation 4,000; Forestry Corporation 5,000; New Zealand Post 8,000.

The wage and price freeze of the early eighties coupled with the removal of financial restrictions and a lack of investment opportunities, led to a speculative bubble on New Zealand's sharemarket, sharemarket crash of 1987, in which New Zealand's sharemarket shed 60% from its 1987 peak, and taking several years to recover.

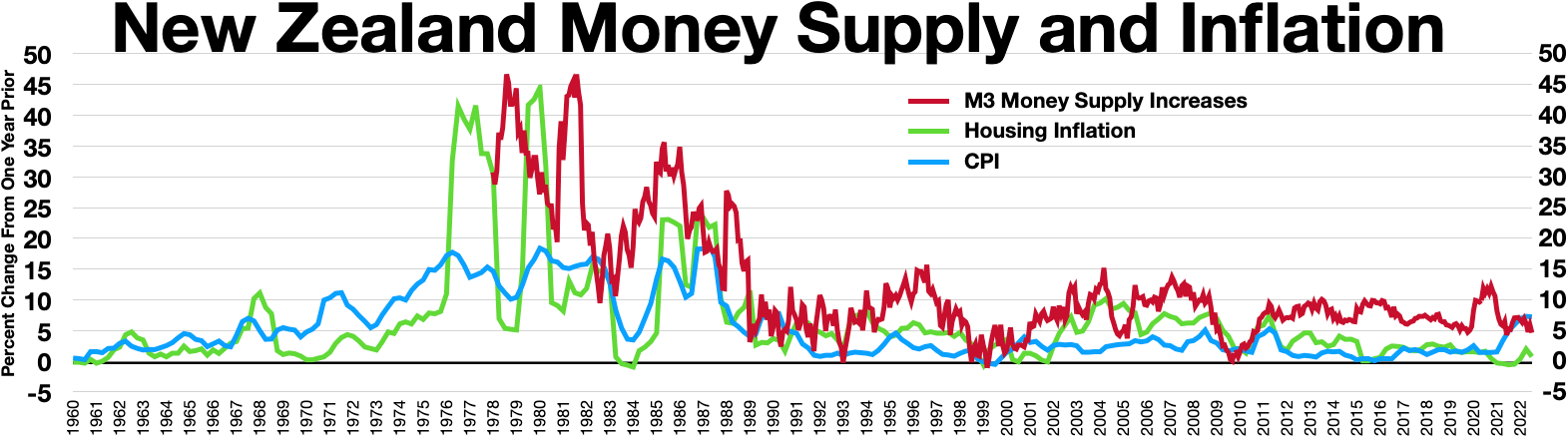
New Zealand money supply and inflation M3 money supply increases Housing inflation Consumer price index

Inflation continued to be a major problem afflicting the New Zealand economy. Between 1985 and 1992, inflation averaged 9% per year and the economy was in recession. The unemployment rate rose from 3.6% to 11%, New Zealand's credit rating dropped twice, and foreign debt quadrupled. In 1989 the Reserve Bank Act 1989 was passed, creating strict monetary policy under the sole control of the Reserve Bank Governor. From then on the Reserve Bank focused on keeping inflation low and stable, using the Official Cash Rate (OCR) – the price of borrowing money in New Zealand – as its primary means to do so. As a result, inflation rates fell to an average of 2.5% in the 1990s, compared to 12% in the 1970s. However, the tightening of monetary policy contributed to rising unemployment in the early 1990s.

The Labour Party was greatly divided over Rogernomics, especially following the 1987 sharemarket crash and its effect on the economy, which slumped along with the rest of the world into recession in the early 1990s. The National Party was returned to power at the 1990 general election and Ruth Richardson became minister of finance under Prime Minister Jim Bolger. The new Government was again thrown a major economic challenge, with the then state-owned Bank of New Zealand needing a bail-out to stay operational.

Richardson's first budget in 1991, nicknamed the 'Mother of all Budgets', attempted to address constant fiscal deficits and borrowing by cutting state spending. Unemployment and social welfare benefits were cut and 'market rents' were introduced for state houses – in some cases tripling the rents of low-income people. Richardson also introduced user-pays requirements in hospitals and schools. These reforms became known derisively as Ruthanasia.

By this time, New Zealand's economy faced serious social problems; the number of New Zealanders estimated to be living in poverty grew by at least 35% between 1989 and 1992; and the economic benefits of privatisation have been questioned. Gross domestic product per capita stagnated between 1986–87 and 1993–94, and by March 1992 unemployment rose to 11.1% Between 1985 and 1992, New Zealand's economy grew by 4.7% during the same period in which the average OECD nation grew by 28.2%. From 1984 to 1993 inflation averaged 9% per year, New Zealand's credit rating dropped twice, and foreign debt quadrupled. Between 1986 and 1993, the unemployment rate rose from 3.6% to 11%.

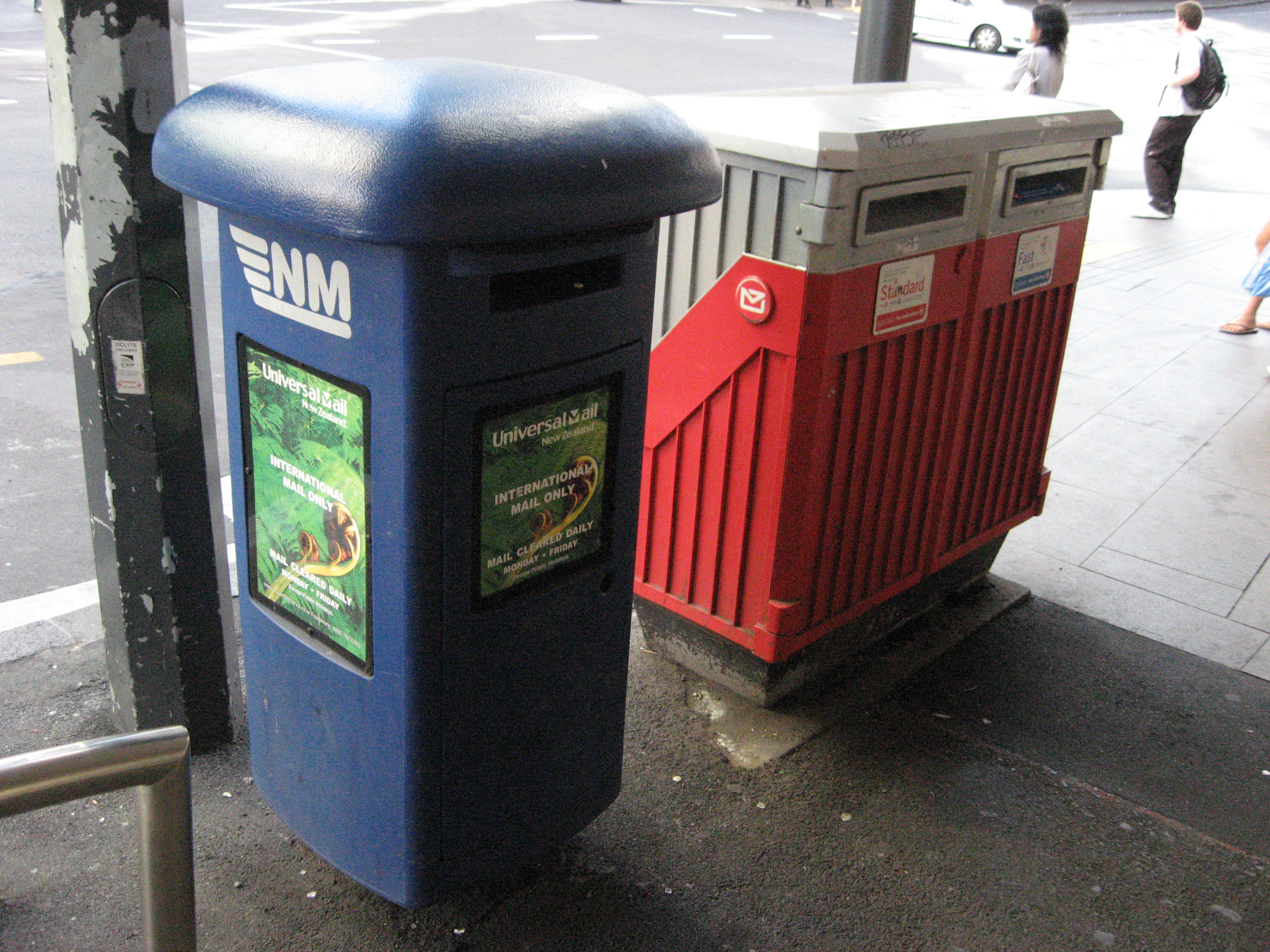
Since the deregulation of the postal sector, different postal operators can install mail collection boxes in New Zealand's streets.

Deregulation also created a business-friendly regulatory framework which has benefited those able to take advantage of it. A 2008 survey in The Heritage Foundation and The Wall Street Journal ranked New Zealand 99.9% in "Business freedom", and 80% overall in "Economic freedom", noting that it takes, on average, only 12 days to establish a business in New Zealand, compared with a worldwide average of 43 days.

Deregulation has also been blamed for other significant negative effects. One of these was the leaky homes crisis, whereby the loosening up of building standards (in the expectation that market forces would assure quality) led to many thousands of severely deficient buildings, mostly residential homes and apartments, being constructed over a period of a decade. The costs of fixing the damage has been estimated at over NZ$11 billion (as at 2009).

=== 21st century ===
New Zealand gross domestic product and net international debt

Unemployment continued to fall from 1993 to 1994 fiscal year, until the onset of the 1997 Asian financial crisis again pushed the rate higher. By 2016 the unemployment rate decreased to 5.3 percent, the lowest level in 7 years.

Between 2000 and 2007, the New Zealand economy expanded by an average of 3.5% a year driven primarily by private consumption and the buoyant housing market. During this period, inflation averaged only 2.6% a year, within the Reserve Bank's target range of 1% to 3%. However, in early 2008 the economy entered recession, before the effects of the Great Recession set in later that year. A drought over the 2007/08 summer led to lower production of dairy products in the first half of 2008. Domestic activity slowed sharply over 2008 as high fuel and food prices dampened domestic consumption, while high interest rates and falling house prices drove a rapid decline in residential investment.

Around the world instability was developing in the finance sector. This reached a peak in September 2008 when the bankruptcy of Lehman Brothers sparked the 2008 financial crisis.

==== Finance company collapses (2006–2012) ====
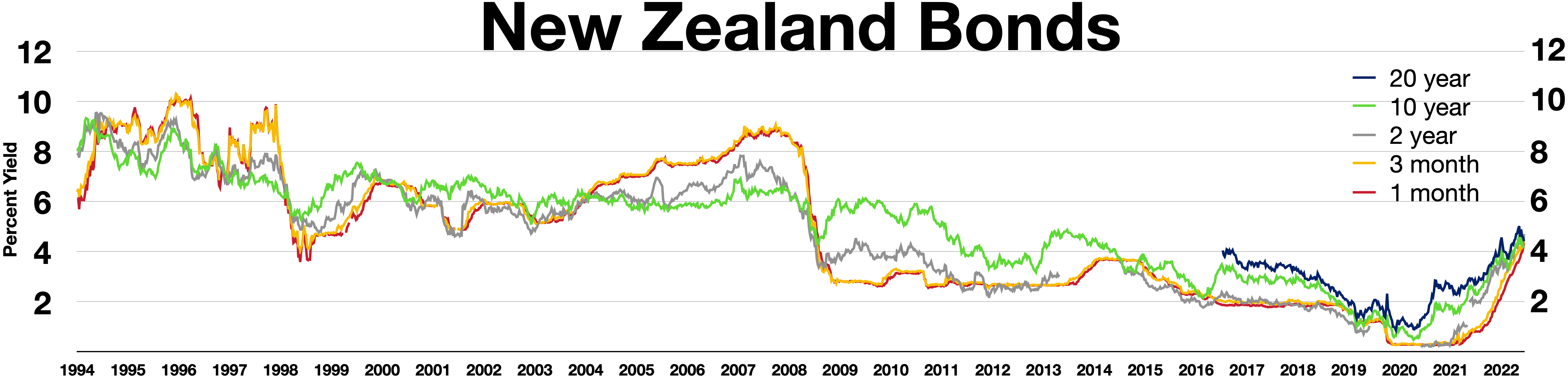
New Zealand bonds Inverted yield curve in 1994–1998 and 2004–2008 20 year 10 year 2 year 3 month 1 month

During the 2008 financial crisis, business and consumer confidence in New Zealand plummeted as dozens of finance companies collapsed. To try and stop a flight of funds from New Zealand institutions to those in Australia, the Government established the Crown Retail Deposit Guarantee Scheme to cover depositors funds in the event that a bank or finance company went broke. This protected some investors but nevertheless, at least 67 finance companies collapsed within a short period of time. The largest of these was South Canterbury Finance which cost taxpayers NZ$1.58 billion when the company collapsed in August 2010. The directors of many of these finance companies were subsequently investigated for fraud and some high-profile directors went to prison.

In an attempt to stimulate the economy, the Reserve Bank lowered the Official Cash Rate (OCR) from a high of 8.25% (July 2008) to an all-time low of 2.5% at the end of April 2009.

Fortunately for New Zealand, the recession was relatively shallow compared to many other nations in the OECD, it was sixth least affected out of the 34 member nations with negative real GDP growth totalling 3.5%. In 2009 the economy picked up, led by strong demand from major trading partners Australia and China, and historically high prices for New Zealand's dairy and log exports. In 2010 the GDP grew by a modest 1.6%, but over the next couple of years economic activity continued to improve, driven by the rebuild in Canterbury after the Christchurch earthquakes and recovery in domestic demand. Through 2011, global conditions deteriorated and the terms of trade eased off their 2011 peak, continuing to moderate until September 2012.

==== "Rock star" economy ====
In 2013, the economy grew 3.3%. HSBC chief economist for Australia and New Zealand, Paul Bloxham, was so impressed that he predicted New Zealand's growth would outpace most of its peers, and he described New Zealand as the "rock star economy of 2014". Another financial commentator said the New Zealand dollar was the "hottest" currency of 2014. Only three months later, the New Zealand Productivity Commission expressed concern about low living standards and problems affecting the long-term drivers of growth. Paul Conway, Director of Economics and Research at the Productivity Commission, wrote: "New Zealand's broad policy settings should generate GDP per capita 20 per cent above the OECD average, but the actual result is more than 20 per cent below average. We may be punching above our weight, but that's only because we are in the wrong weight division!" In August, Bloxham admitted that "the sharp decline in dairy prices over the last six months has clouded the outlook somewhat". In December however Bloxham stated that he thought the New Zealand economy would continue to grow strongly.

In 2014 increased attention was paid to the growing gap between rich and poor. In The Guardian, Max Rashbrook said policies implemented by both Labour and National governments have increased inequality. He claims that for twenty years outrage "has been muted", but "Alarm bells are finally beginning to sound. Recent polling shows three-quarters of New Zealanders think theirs is no longer an egalitarian country".

==== COVID-19 pandemic and recession (2020–22) ====
New Zealand recorded its first case of COVID-19 on 28 February 2020. In response to the pandemic, the country closed its borders to everyone except New Zealand citizens and residents on 19 March, and went into full lockdown from 26 March to 27 April, followed by a partial lockdown from 28 April to 13 May.

The border closure combined with the lockdowns saw the retail, accommodation, hospitality, and transport sectors experiencing major declines. On 17 September 2020, New Zealand officially entered a recession, with the country's gross domestic product retracting by 12.2% in the June quarter. The GDP rebounded 14% in the September quarter to leave a 2.2% year-on-year retraction.

After successfully containing the virus, the New Zealand economy had sharp growth in what is known as a V-shaped recovery and ended the year with an overall economic expansion of 0.4%, better than the predicted 1.7% contraction. Unemployment also dropped to 4.9% in December 2020, down from a peak Covid effected rate of 5.3% in September.

Restrictions returned in late 2021 after COVID-19 was again present in New Zealand and continued until late 2023.

By 23 September 2021, the Restaurant Association's Chief executive Marisa Bidois estimated that about 1,000 hospitality businesses nationwide had been forced to close as a result of the COVID-19 pandemic, leading to the loss of 13,000 jobs. In response, the Association lobbied the Government for Government for continued wage subsidies and incentives to boost customer rates. On 13 November 2021, the Bay of Plenty Times reported that 26,774 companies had been liquidated during the first eight months of 2021.

On 27 January 2022, New Zealand's inflation rate hit a 30-year record high of 5.9% at the end of 2021. According to figures released by Statistics New Zealand, the rising cost of construction, petrol and rents pushed the consumer price index up 1.4 per cent between October and December 2021. Statistics NZ also recorded a two percent increase in household utilities expenses, which was fuelled by the rising costs of new dwellings (which rose by 16% from 2020) and a 30 percent hike in fuel prices (from NZ $1.87 per litre to $2.45 per litre). Prime Minister Jacinda Ardern attributed the sharp inflation rate to rising crude oil prices overseas. By contrast, the opposition National Party leader Christopher Luxon and Finance spokesperson Simon Bridges attributed rising inflation to the Government's "wasteful" spending.

On 1 February 2022, an annual report released by the Organisation of Economic Cooperation and Development (OECD) identified the country's border restrictions and declining house prices as the main risks facing New Zealand's economy that year. While the OECD report credited New Zealand's elimination strategy and macroeconomic stimuli such as wage and socio-economic subsidies with helping the economy to bounce back to pre-COVID-19 levels, it also warned that excessive Government spending was causing the economy to overheat and substantial increases in household and government debt. The OECD welcomed the Reserve Bank's decision to raise interest rates but also urged the Government to raise the superannuation age, eliminate obstacles to building houses, and reduce government spending. The OECD also supported the introduction of a social insurance scheme for unemployed workers.

==== Post COVID-19 pandemic (2023–present) ====
After the last COVID-19 restrictions were abandoned in 2023, New Zealand entered economic stagnation and recession. Continued inflation, interest rate rises and low consumer spending lead to low-to-negative economic growth from 2022 through 2024.

== Overview ==
New Zealand Government gross and net debt series

In 2015 the Social Progress Index, which covers such areas as basic human needs, foundations of well-being, and the level of opportunity available to citizens, ranked the New Zealand economy fifth in the world. However, the outlook includes some challenges. New Zealand income levels, which used to be above those of many countries in Western Europe prior to the crisis of the 1970s, dropped in relative terms and never recovered. As a result, the number of New Zealanders living in poverty has grown and income inequality has increased dramatically.

New Zealand has also had persistent current-account deficits since the early 1970s, peaking at −7.8% of GDP in 2006 but falling to −2.6% of GDP in FY 2014. The CIA World Fact Book estimates New Zealand's 2017 public debt (that owed by the government) at 31.7% of GDP. Between 1984 and 2006, net external foreign debt increased 11-fold, to NZ$182 billion. As of June 2018 gross core crown debt was NZ$84,524 million or 29.5% of GDP and net core crown debt was NZ$62,114 million or 21.7% of GDP.

New Zealand Government Gross Debt as percent of GDP 1860 to 2000

GDP per capita development in Australia and New Zealand

Despite New Zealand's persistent current-account deficits, the balance on external goods and services has generally been positive. In FY 2014, export receipts exceeded imports by NZ$3.9 billion. There has been an investment income imbalance or net outflow for debt-servicing of external loans. In FY 2014, New Zealand's investment income from the rest of the world was NZ$7 billion, versus outgoings of NZ$16.3 billion, a deficit of NZ$9.3 billion. The proportion of the current-account deficit that is attributable to the investment income imbalance (a net outflow to the Australian-owned banking sector) grew from one third in 1997 to roughly 70% in 2008.

=== Taxation ===
At the national level the Inland Revenue Department (IRD) collects tax in New Zealand on behalf of the New Zealand Government. New Zealanders pay national taxes on personal and business income, and on the supply of goods and services (GST). There is no capital-gains tax, although certain "gains" such as profits on the sale of patent rights are deemed to be income. Income tax does apply to property transactions in certain circumstances, particularly speculation. Local authorities manage and collect local property taxes (rates). Some goods and services carry a specific tax, referred to as an excise or a duty such as alcohol excise or gaming duty. These are collected by a range of government agencies such as the New Zealand Customs Service. There is no social security (payroll) tax or land tax in New Zealand.

The 2010 New Zealand budget announced cuts to personal tax-rates, with the top personal tax-rate reduced from 38% to 33% The cuts gave New Zealand the second-lowest personal tax burden in the OECD. Only Mexico's citizens retained a higher percentage-wise "take home" proportion of their salaries.

The cuts in income tax were estimated to reduce revenue by $2.46 billion. To compensate, the National government raised GST from 12.5% to 15%. Treasury figures show that top income-earners in New Zealand pay between 6% and 8% of their income on GST. Those at the bottom end, earning less than $356 a week, spend between 11% and 14% on GST. Based on these figures, The New Zealand Herald predicted that putting GST up to 15% would increase living costs for the poor more than twice as much as for the rich.

=== Corruption ===
New Zealand ranked 1st on the Transparency International Corruption Perceptions Index (CPI) of 2017 with a score of 89 out of 100. In 2018 New Zealand ranked 2nd on the Corruption Perceptions Index with a score of 87 out of 100. In 2019, New Zealand ranked 1st on the Corruption Perceptions Index with a score of 87 out of 100. Although New Zealand is one of the least corrupt countries in the world, corruption still exists in New Zealand.

=== Regional economies ===
Map of regions of New Zealand

In March 2026, Statistics New Zealand published details of the break-down of gross domestic product in the regions of New Zealand for the year ended March 2025:

Region (map reference)	GDP 2025 (NZ$ million)	Share of national GDP	GDP per capita 2025 (NZ$)	GDP growth 2024–25
Northland (1)	11,645	2.7%	57,992	▲ +5.9%
Auckland (2)	161,800	37.5%	89,521	▲ +2.1%
Waikato (3)	38,306	8.9%	72,330	▲ +6.2%
Bay of Plenty (4)	25,041	5.8%	71,343	▲ +5.4%
Gisborne (5)	3,093	0.7%	58,588	▲ +4.7%
Hawke's Bay (6)	12,580	2.9%	69,966	▲ +4.6%
Taranaki (7)	11,088	2.6%	85,095	▲ +0.7%
Manawatū-Whanganui (8)	17,146	4.0%	65,844	▲ +5.1%
Wellington (9)	51,317	11.9%	94,438	▼ −0.1%
North Island	332,016	77.0%	81,868	▲ +2.8%
Tasman / Nelson (10 / 11) (Note: Nelson and Tasman are combined by Statistics New Zealand, but are separate regions.)	7,788	1.8%	68,194	▲ +2.2%
Marlborough (12)	4,249	1.0%	83,484	▲ +1.8%
West Coast (13)	2,687	0.6%	77,650	▲ +8.1%
Canterbury (14) (Note: Includes the Chatham Islands.)	55,505	12.9%	79,852	▲ +5.3%
Otago (15)	19,269	4.5%	76,101	▲ +4.5%
Southland (16)	9,943	2.3%	95,061	▲ +9.8%
South Island	99,441	23.0%	79,388	▲ +5.2%
New Zealand	431,457	100.0%	81,283	▲ +3.3%

=== Unemployment ===
Prior to the economic shock created by Britain's decision to join the European Economic Community (EEC) in 1973, which removed the UK as New Zealand's primary market for exports, unemployment in New Zealand was very low. A recession and a collapse in wool prices in 1966 led to unemployment rising by 131%, but still represented only a 0.7% percentage point increase in the unemployment rate.

After 1973, unemployment became a persistent economic and social issue in New Zealand. Recessions from 1976 to 1978 and from 1982 to 1983 greatly increased unemployment again. Between 1985 and 2012 the unemployment rate averaged 6.29%. After the stock market crash of 1987, unemployment rose 170% reaching an all-time high of 11.20% in September 1991. The 1997 Asian financial crisis sent unemployment upwards again, by 28%. By 2007 it had dropped again and the rate stood at 3.5% (December 2007), its lowest level since the current method of surveying began in 1986. This gave the country the 5th-best ranking in the OECD (with an OECD average at the time of 5.5%). The low numbers correlated with a robust economy and a large backlog of job positions at all levels. Unemployment numbers are not always directly comparable between OECD nations, as members do not all keep labour market statistics in the same way.

The percentage of the population employed has also increased in recent years, to 68.8% of all inhabitants, with full-time jobs increasing slightly, and part-time occupations decreasing in turn. The increase in the working population percentage is attributed to increasing wages and higher costs of living moving more people into employment. The low unemployment also had some disadvantages, with many companies unable to fill jobs.

Starting with the 2008 financial crisis, unemployment began to rise. This trend continued until September 2012, reaching a high of 6.7%. It began to recover after that point, sitting at 3.9% as of June 2019.

In late July 2025, Statistics New Zealand reported that the construction and manufacturing sectors had lost over 18,000 filled jobs in 2024. Youth unemployment for people aged 15 to 19 years rose by 10 percent as well.

=== Housing affordability ===
Shamubeel Eaqub, formerly a principal economist at the New Zealand Institute of Economic Research (NZIER), said in 2014 that thirty years prior, an average house in New Zealand cost two or three times the average household income. House prices rose dramatically in the first years of the 21st century and by 2007, an average house cost more than six times household income. International surveys in 2013 showed that housing was unaffordable in all eight of New Zealand's major markets – "unaffordable" being defined as house prices which are more than three times the median regional income.

Demand for property has been strongest in Auckland. In 2014 the average sales price there went from $619,136 to $696,047, a rise of 12% in that 12-month period alone. In 2015, prices rose another 14%. This made Auckland New Zealand's least affordable market and one of the most expensive cities in the world with houses costing 8 times the average income. Between 2012 and April 2016, the average Auckland home increased in price by just over two-thirds reaching $931,000 – higher than the cost of an average home in Sydney.

As a result, more people are being priced out of the property market. Those on low incomes are hardest hit, affecting many Maori and Pasifika. New Zealand's relatively high mortgage-rates are exacerbating the problem making it difficult for young people with steady jobs to buy their first home. According to a 2012 submission made to the Housing Affordability Inquiry, escalating house prices are also impacting on many middle income groups, especially those with large families. Mortgage adviser Bruce Patten said the trend was "disturbing" and added to the gap between the "haves and have-nots".

Property-analysis company CoreLogic said that 45% of house purchases in New Zealand are now made by investors who already own a home, while another 28% are made by people moving from one property to another. Approximately 8% of purchases go to overseas-based cash buyers – primarily Australians, Chinese, and British – although most economists believe that foreign investment is currently too small to have a significant effect on property prices.

Whether purchases are made by New Zealanders or by foreigners, it is generally those who are already well off who are buying the bulk of properties on the market. This has had a dramatic effect on home-ownership rates by Kiwis, as of 2013 at its lowest level since 1951. Even as recently as 1991, 76% of New Zealand homes were occupied by their owners. By 2013, this had reduced to 63%, indicating that more and more people are having to rent. Raewyn Cox, chief executive of the Federation of Family Budgeting, says: "High prices and high interest rates (have) sentenced a rising number of New Zealanders to be lifetime tenants" where they are "stuck in expensive rental situations, heading towards retirement".

=== Inequality ===
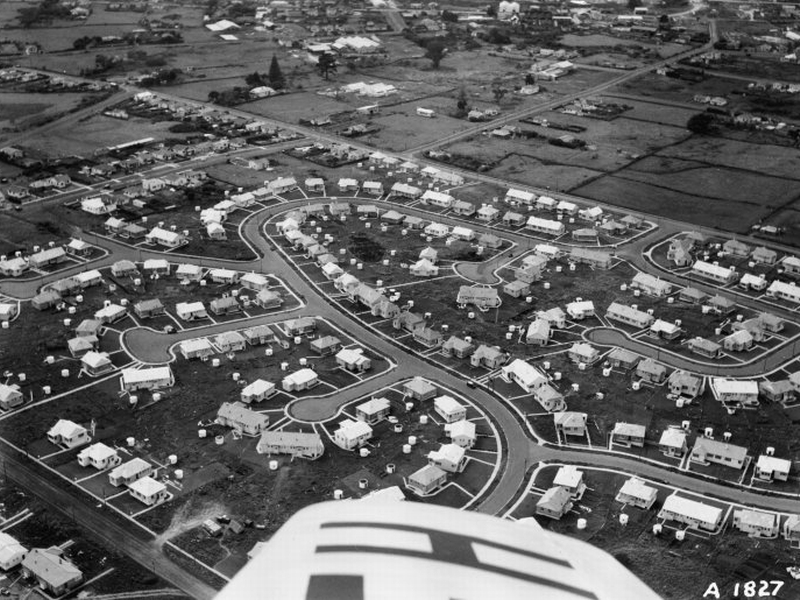
In the interwar and post-war periods, successive governments sponsored a massive state housing programme.

Between 1982 and 2011 New Zealand's gross domestic product grew by 35%. Almost half of that increase went to a small group who were already the richest in the country. During this period, the average income of the top 10% of earners in New Zealand (those earning more than $72,000) almost doubled going from $56,300 to $100,200. The average income of the poorest tenth increased by 13% from $9700 to $11,000.

Statistics New Zealand, which keeps track of income disparity using the P80/20 ratio, confirms the increase in income inequality. The ratio shows the difference between high household incomes (those in the 80th percentile) and low household incomes (those in the 20th percentile). The inequality ratio increased between 1988 and 2004, and decreased until the onset of the Great Recession, increasing again to 2011 and then declining again from then. By 2013 the disposable income of high-income households was more than two-and-a-half times larger than that of low-income households.

In 2020, the OECD gave New Zealand a Gini inequality coefficient of 0.320 or 25th (out of 37) in the OECD.

=== Superannuation ===
New Zealand has a universal superannuation scheme. Only people who are aged 65 years old or over, are New Zealand citizens or permanent residents and who are residing in New Zealand at the time of application are eligible. They must also have lived in New Zealand for at least 10 years since they turned 20 with five of those years being since they turned 50. Time spent overseas in certain countries and for certain reasons may be counted for New Zealand superannuation. New Zealand superannuation is taxed, the rate of which depends on superannuitants' other income. The amount of superannuation paid depends on the person's household situation. For a married couple the net tax amount is set by legislation to be no less than 66% of net average wage.

Because of the growing number of elderly becoming eligible, superannuation costs rose from $7.3 billion a year in 2008 to $10.2 billion in 2014. In 2011 there were twice as many children in New Zealand as elderly (65 and over); by 2051 there are projected to be 60% more elderly than children. In the ten years from 2014, the number of New Zealanders over the age of 65 was projected to grow by about 200,000.

This poses a significant problem for superannuation. The government gradually increased the age of eligibility from 61 to 65 between 1993 and 2001. In that year the Labour Government of Helen Clark introduced the New Zealand Superannuation Fund (known as the "Cullen Fund" after Minister of Finance Michael Cullen) to part-fund the superannuation scheme into the future. As at October 2014, the fund managed NZ$27.11 billion, 15.9% of which it invested within New Zealand.

In 2007 the same Government introduced a new individual saving-scheme, known as KiwiSaver. KiwiSaver principally targets growing people's retirement savings, but younger participants can also use it to save a deposit for their first home. The scheme is voluntary, work-based and managed by private-sector companies called "KiwiSaver providers". As of 2014, KiwiSaver had 2.3 million active members (60.9% of New Zealand's population under 65). NZ$4 billion was contributed annually, and a total of NZ$19.1 billion has been contributed since 2007.

=== Consumption ===
New Zealanders see themselves as first-world consumers with first-world tastes and habits – mitigated only slightly by the country's remoteness from main global producers.

In 2023, New Zealand's Final Consumption Expenditure was 199.99 billion.

== Industries ==
=== Agriculture, fishing and forestry ===
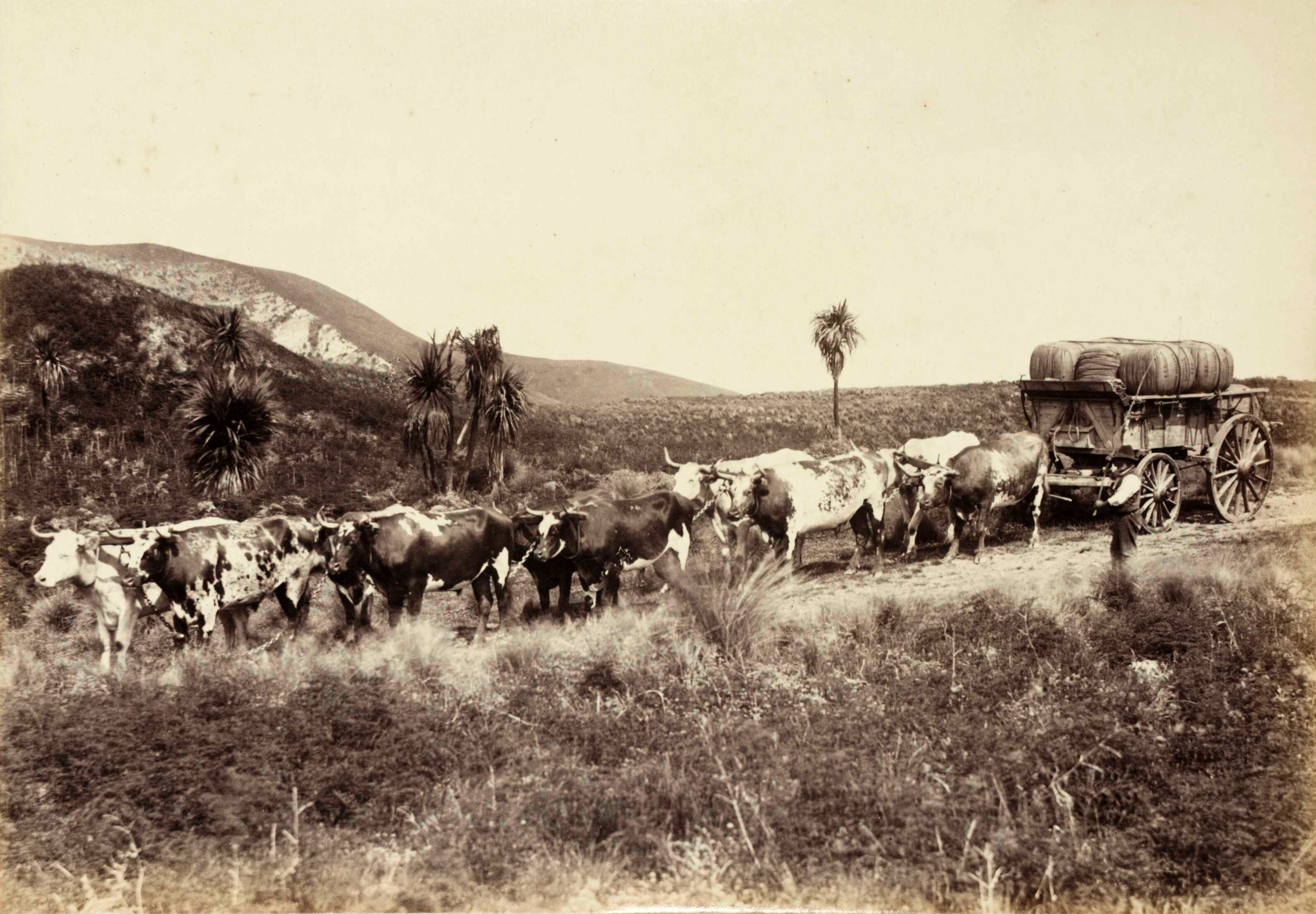
A bullock wagon team taking wool from a farm station. The number of sheep in New Zealand peaked in the 1980s and has reduced due to lower profits from wool, and larger breeds of sheep for meat.

In New Zealand, agriculture is the largest sector of the tradable economy. The country exported NZ$46.4 billion worth of agricultural products (raw and manufactured) in the 12 months to June 2019, 79.6% of the country's total exported goods. The agriculture, forestry and fisheries sector directly contributed $12.653 billion (or 5.1%) of the national GDP in the 12 months to September 2020, and employed 143,000 people, 5.9% of New Zealand's workforce, as of the 2018 census.

New Zealand is unique in being the only developed country to be totally exposed to the international markets since subsidies, tax concessions and price supports for the agricultural sector were removed in the 1980s. However, as of 2017, the New Zealand Government still provides state investment in infrastructure which supports agriculture.

Pastoral farming is the major land use, but a significant amount of land is also devoted to horticulture.

New Zealand is a member of the Cairns Group, which is seeking to have free trade in agricultural goods.

=== Banking and finance ===
The Banking sector in New Zealand dates back to the early days of European settlement in the country. Over the years, the banking industry has played a vital role in supporting economic growth and development, providing financial services to individuals, businesses, and the government. This article explores the significant milestones and transformations in the history of the New Zealand banking sector.

=== Beer and wine ===
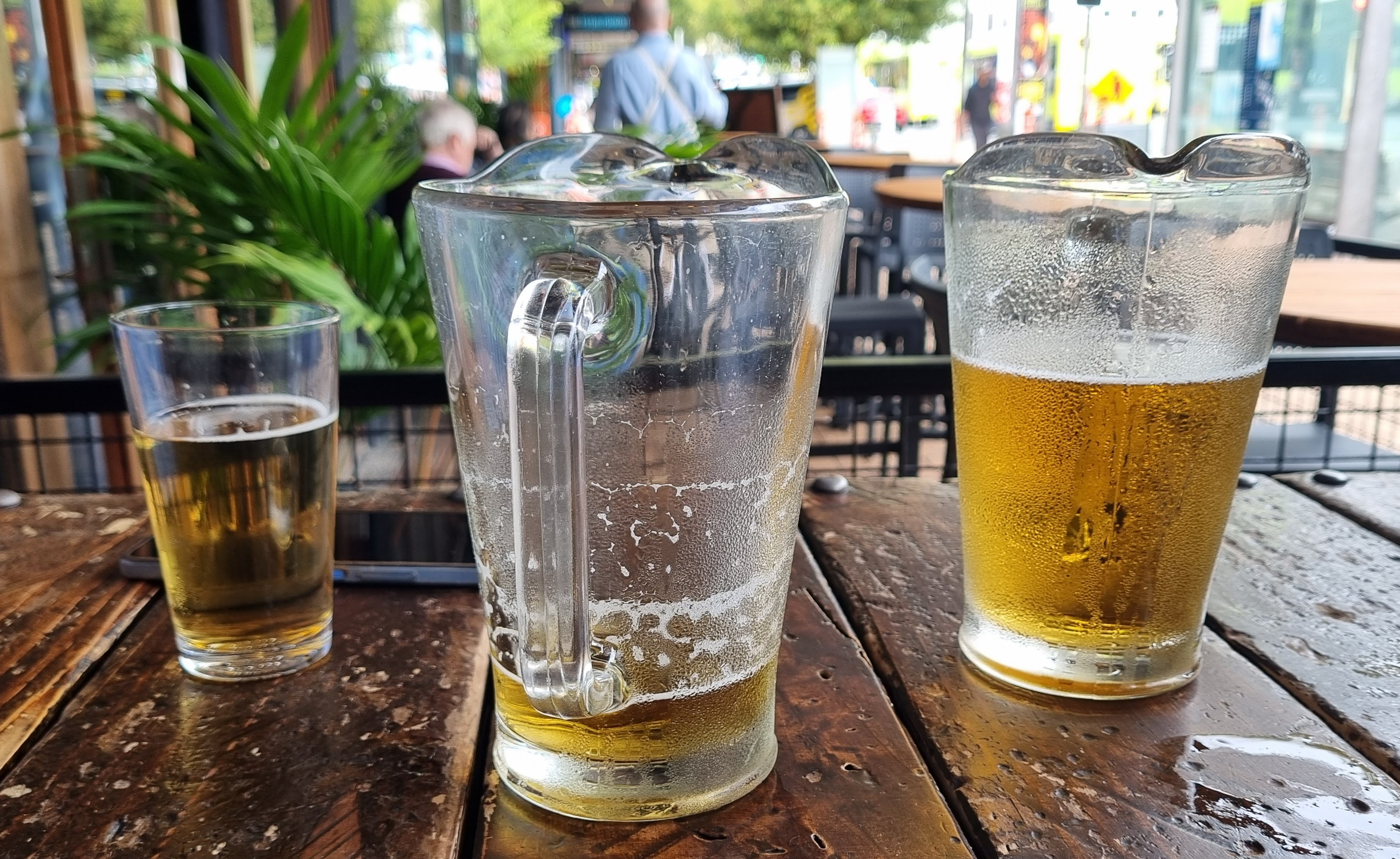
Jugs of tap beer

Beer is the most popular alcoholic drink in New Zealand, accounting for 59% of available alcohol for sale in 2023, down from 65% in 2009. At around 61 litres per person per annum, New Zealand was ranked 27th in global beer consumption per capita in 2019. About 85% of beer available in New Zealand in 2023 was produced locally, and 15% was imported. The vast majority of beer produced in New Zealand is a type of lager, either pale or amber in colour, and typically 4–5% alcohol by volume.

Although the two largest breweries in New Zealand, Lion New Zealand and DB Breweries, control almost 90% of sales by volume between them, there are over 200 smaller craft breweries and brewpubs producing a vast range of beer styles, including many ales.

New Zealand wine is produced in several of its distinct winegrowing regions. (Note: If New Zealand as a whole is taken to be a wine region then the various 'regions' may be regarded as sub-regions.) As an island country in the South Pacific Ocean, New Zealand has a largely maritime climate, although its elongated geography produces considerable regional variation from north to south. Like many other New World wines, New Zealand wine is usually produced and labelled as single varietal wines, or if blended, winemakers list the varietal components on the label. New Zealand is best known for its Marlborough Sauvignon Blanc, and more recently for premium cool-climate Pinot Noir from Marlborough, Martinborough, Central Otago and the limestone-rich Waitaki Valley.

While New Zealand wine traces its history to the early 19th century, the modern wine industry in New Zealand began in the mid-20th century and expanded rapidly in the early 21st century, growing by 17% a year from 2000 to 2020. In 2020, New Zealand produced 329 million litres (87,000,000 US gal) from 39,935 hectares (98,680 acres) of vineyard area, of which ha (about two-thirds) is dedicated to Sauvignon Blanc. Nearly 90% of total production is exported, chiefly to the United States, Britain and Australia, reaching a record NZ$1.92 billion in export revenue in 2020.

=== Hospitality ===
The hospitality industry in New Zealand is a major industry operating around the country. It is one of the largest employment sectors in the country, contributing about 1.7% of GDP, equivalent to NZ$5 billion annually.

Businesses in the sector can be divided into four broad categories: Quick Service Restaurants; Takeaways; Pubs, Taverns and Bars; and Cafes and Restaurants. More than half of the sector's workforce work in cafes and restaurants, and more than half of sales occur in the Auckland, Canterbury and Wellington regions.

The sector has a long-term shortage of workers, particularly skilled chefs and managers. Workers do not require formal qualifications, but require customer service skills and may require certificates to manage premises and sell alcohol. The shortage of workers has been made worse due to the COVID-19 pandemic.

=== Manufacturing ===
Manufacturing in New Zealand contributed $23 billion (12%) of the country's gross domestic product and directly employed 241,000 people in 2017, while manufactured goods made up 52% of the country's exports by value. The food and beverage subsector alone contributed 32% of manufacturing's GDP and 71% of exports.

New Zealand has a disadvantage in export manufacturing due to its small population, isolated location, and high costs. Therefore, the majority of manufacturing is for the domestic markets, with the majority of exported manufactured goods being large-scale commodities (e.g. meat and dairy), high-value innovative products, and products targeting global niches.

=== Mining ===
Mining in New Zealand began when the Māori quarried rock such as argillite in times prior to European colonisation. Mining by Europeans began in the latter half of the 19th century.

New Zealand has abundant resources of coal, silver, iron ore, limestone, and gold. It is ranked 22 in the world in terms of iron ore production and 29th in gold production. The total value of mineral production in New Zealand was $1.5 billion in 2006 (excluding oil and gas). The most important metallic minerals produced are gold (10.62 tonnes), silver (27.2 tonnes), and titanomagnetite ironsand (2.15 million tonnes). A 2008 report estimated that the unexploited resources of just seven core minerals (including gold, copper, iron, and molybdenum) totalled around $140 billion in worth.

The mining sector makes a significant contribution to the New Zealand economy. In 2004, the value of production from mining (excluding oil and gas) was $1,142 million, or just under 1% of gross domestic product. In 2017 mining contributed $3,079m (1.3%) to a GDP of $235,945m.

In 2009, there were 6,800 people employed directly in mining, and 8,000 people, indirectly, flowing from the economic activity of the 6,800. The median wage for a mining employee was $57,320 in 2008, compared to the New Zealand median of $33,530. In 2017, mining employed 5,300 (0.2%), out of a total workforce of 2,593,000. In 2015, miners' average hourly earnings were $39.86, and median hourly earnings $31.33, though the number of miners had fallen to 6,300, compared to nationwide figures of $27.49, $22.92, and 2,004,100 (3%). These figures may need to be treated with caution, as miners appear to have been earning 5% of total income (average earnings × employees), though GDP contribution in 2015 was only 1.6%.

The latter decades of the 20th century and into the 21st century saw opposition to mining on environmental grounds. The Crown Minerals Act 1991 is a major piece of legislation relating to mining, and a review of Schedule 4 of the Act provoked considerable controversy late in the first decade of the 2000s.

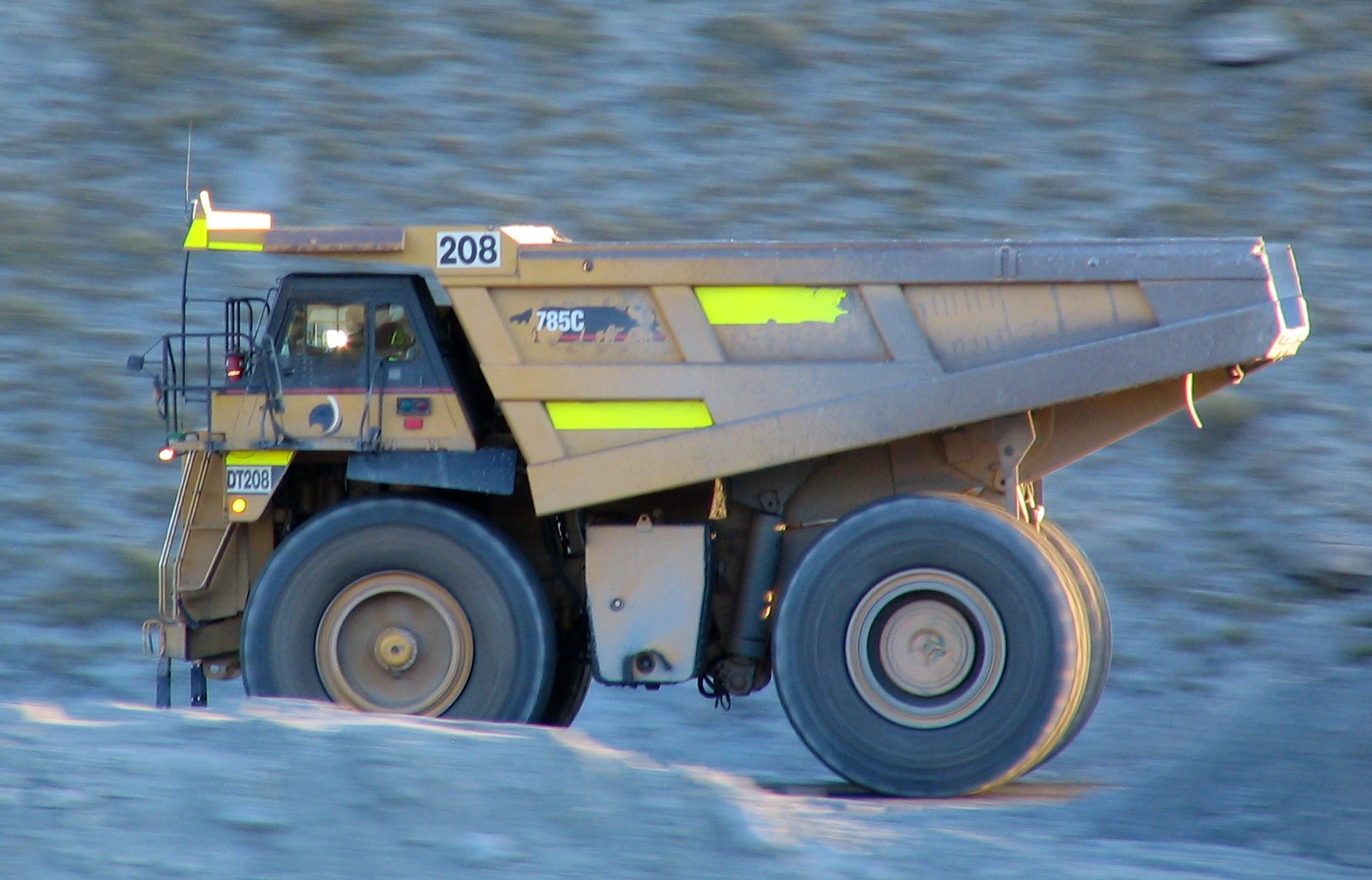
Gold mining in Otago

=== Oil and gas ===
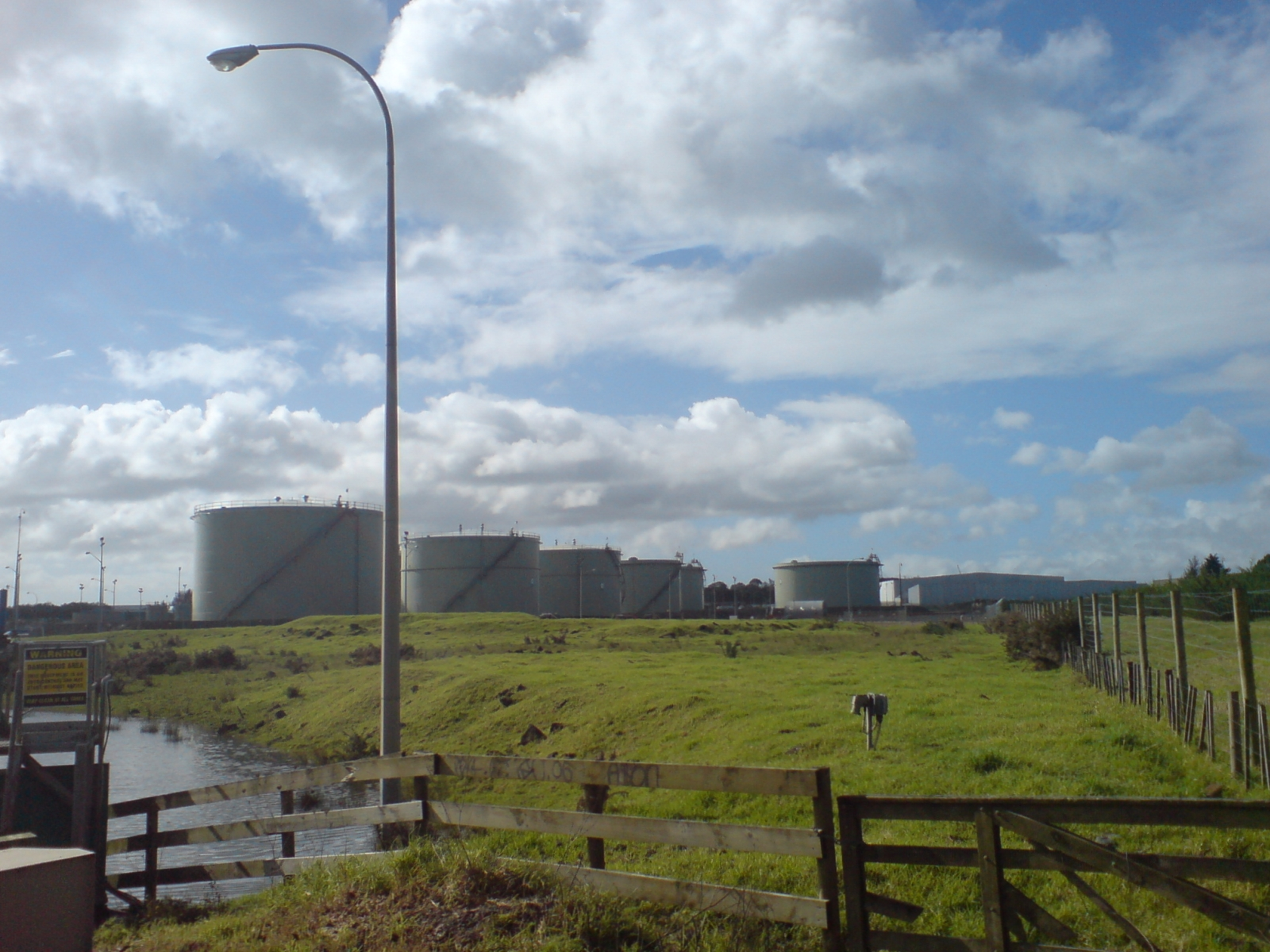
Storage tanks at the Wiri terminal of the Marsden Point to Auckland pipeline for transport fuels

The oil and gas industry in New Zealand explores and develops oil and gas fields, and produces and distributes petroleum products and natural gas.

New Zealand has had one significant oil refinery, the Marsden Point Oil Refinery, which operated from 1964 to 2022. The site is now used for importing refined fuel, about half of which comes from South Korea, and a third from Singapore, as of 2025.

In 2022, New Zealand's net self-sufficiency in oil (production divided by consumption) was 12%, i.e. the country imported much more crude and refined oil than it exported. All crude oil extracted in New Zealand was (and is) exported as the Marsden Point refinery was not suited to processing it. In 2018, 60 petajoules of crude were produced in New Zealand, 380 PJ of petroleum products imported (most of it crude), and 283 PJ consumed. The difference is exported or used for international travel (aviation fuel and similar).

Oil and gas are produced from 21 petroleum licenses / permits, all in the Taranaki basin. The most important fields are Kapuni, Maui, Pohokura and Kupe. Exploration for oil and gas reserves includes the Great South Basin and offshore areas near Canterbury and Gisborne.

There are 2,600 kilometres of high-pressure natural gas transmission pipelines in the North Island. Most of these are owned and operated by First Gas, including the Maui pipeline, a 307 km pipeline that carries 78% of all natural gas produced in New Zealand. The low-pressure gas pipelines that distribute gas to end users are owned by First Gas (Northland, Waikato, Bay of Plenty, Gisborne, Kapiti Coast), Vector (Auckland), Powerco (Hawke's Bay, Taranaki, Manawatu, Wellington) and GasNet (Wanganui).

The largest retailers of gas are Contact Energy and Vector. There is no natural gas transmission in the South Island. New Zealand has one underground gas storage facility, the Ahuroa Gas Storage Facility. The major industry body is Energy Resources Aotearoa.

=== Retailing ===
Retailing in New Zealand is an important sector in the economy of New Zealand, as a channel for a large proportion of household spending and international visitor spending.

The overall size of the sector has been increasing since the end of the 1997 Asian financial crisis, with retail sales increasing by 30% between 1999 and 2005. One contributing factor was the growth of larger stores with greater buying power and economies of scale, at the cost of smaller bricks and mortar merchants. Another contributing factor was low price inflation, with the price of imported goods falling 12% during that period.

By 2004, about 15% of New Zealand businesses were retail outlets. These businesses accounted for 19% of total employment and 7.5% of the Gross Domestic Product with total sales of about $51 billion. Supermarket and grocery stores made up about 28% of non-auto sales and 16% of retail employees.

The beginning of the COVID-19 pandemic in New Zealand had a major impact on the retail sector. Sales dropped 15% in the June 2020 quarter before increasing 7.4% in the September 2020 quarter. The sector recovered faster than originally expected.

In 2021, BDO identified the key trends in the New Zealand retail sector to be rising staffing costs, increased online shopping, changing technology, and the need to improve efficiency without compromising customer experience.

=== Tourism ===
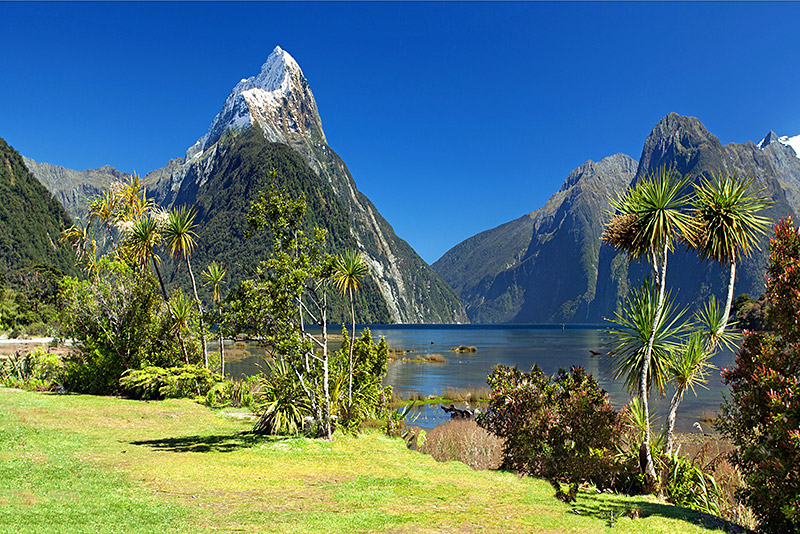
Milford Sound, one of New Zealand's most popular tourist destinations

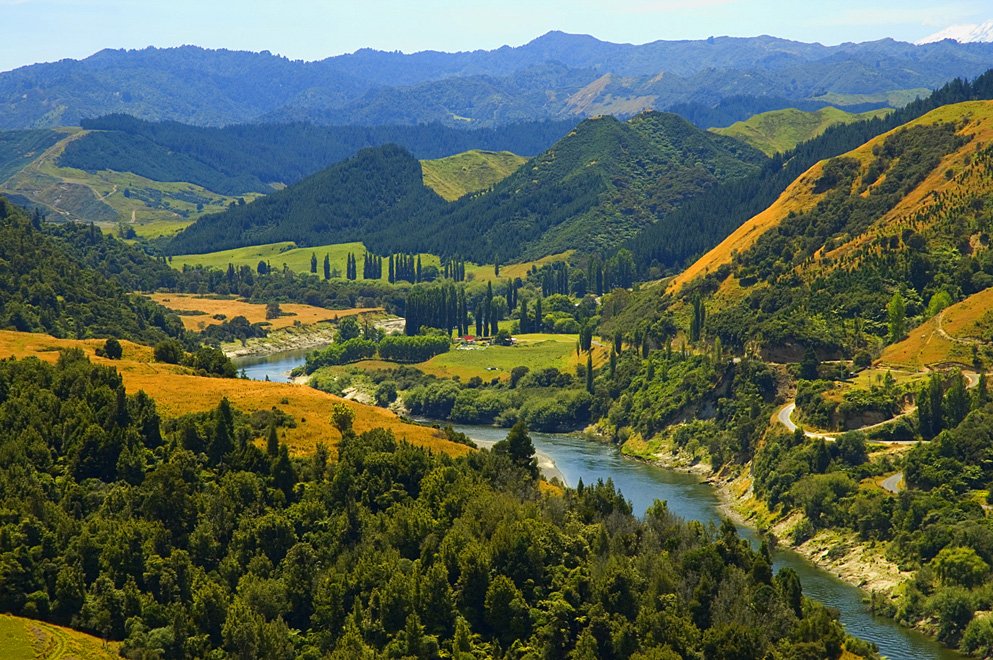
Hills above the Whanganui River

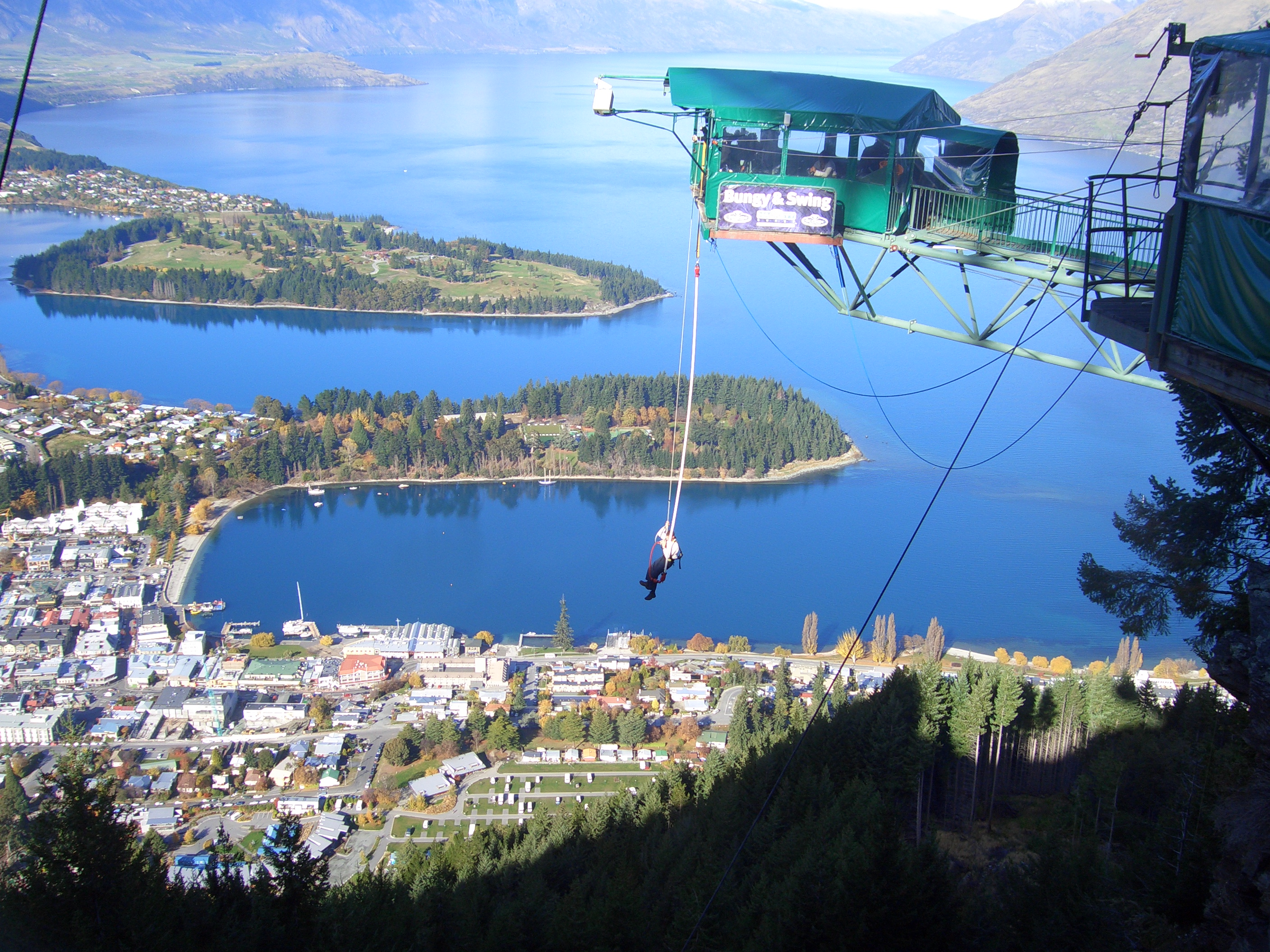
Bungee jumping has become a popular activity in the resort town of Queenstown.

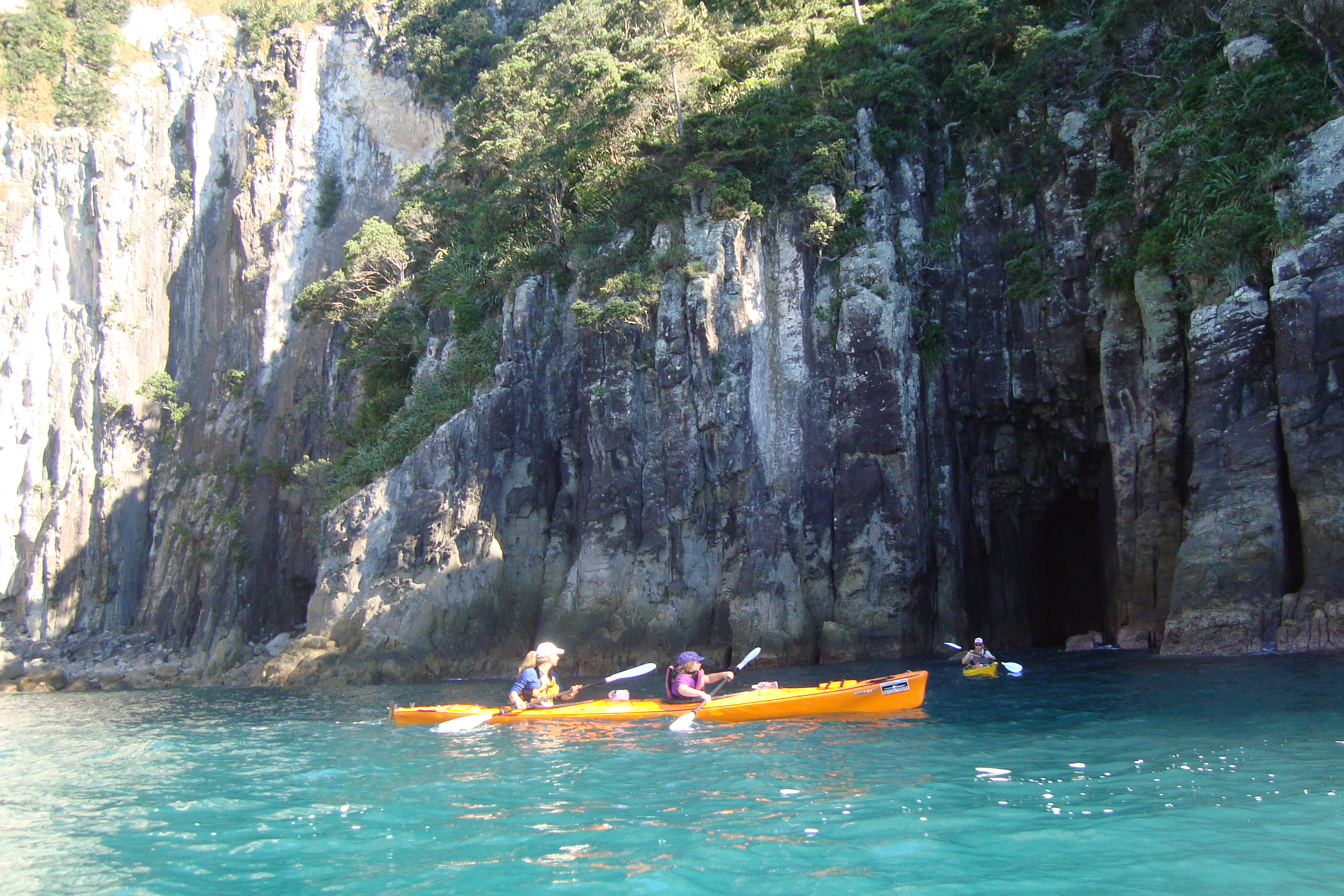
Sea-kayaking from Hahei

Tourism in New Zealand comprised an important sector of the national economy – tourism directly contributed NZ$16.2 billion (or 5.8%) of the country's GDP in the year ending March 2019. As of 2016 tourism supported 188,000 full-time-equivalent jobs (nearly 7.5% of New Zealand's workforce). The flow-on effects of tourism indirectly contributed a further 4.3% of GDP (or NZ$9.8 billion). Despite the country's geographical isolation, spending by international tourists accounted for 17.1% of New Zealand's export earnings (nearly NZ$12 billion). International and domestic tourism contributed, in total, NZ$34 billion to New Zealand's economy every year as of 2017.

New Zealand markets itself abroad as a "clean, green" adventure-playground (Tourism New Zealand's main marketing slogan, "100% Pure New Zealand", reflects this), emphasising as typical tourist destinations nature areas such as Milford Sound, Abel Tasman National Park and the Tongariro Alpine Crossing; while activities such as bungee jumping or whale watching exemplify typical tourist attractions, marketed primarily to individual and small-group travellers. Australia provides by far the largest group of New Zealand's international tourists (about 45%), due to its close proximity (three to four hours by plane) and traditional good relations. Mainland China, the United States and the United Kingdom are the next three largest markets.

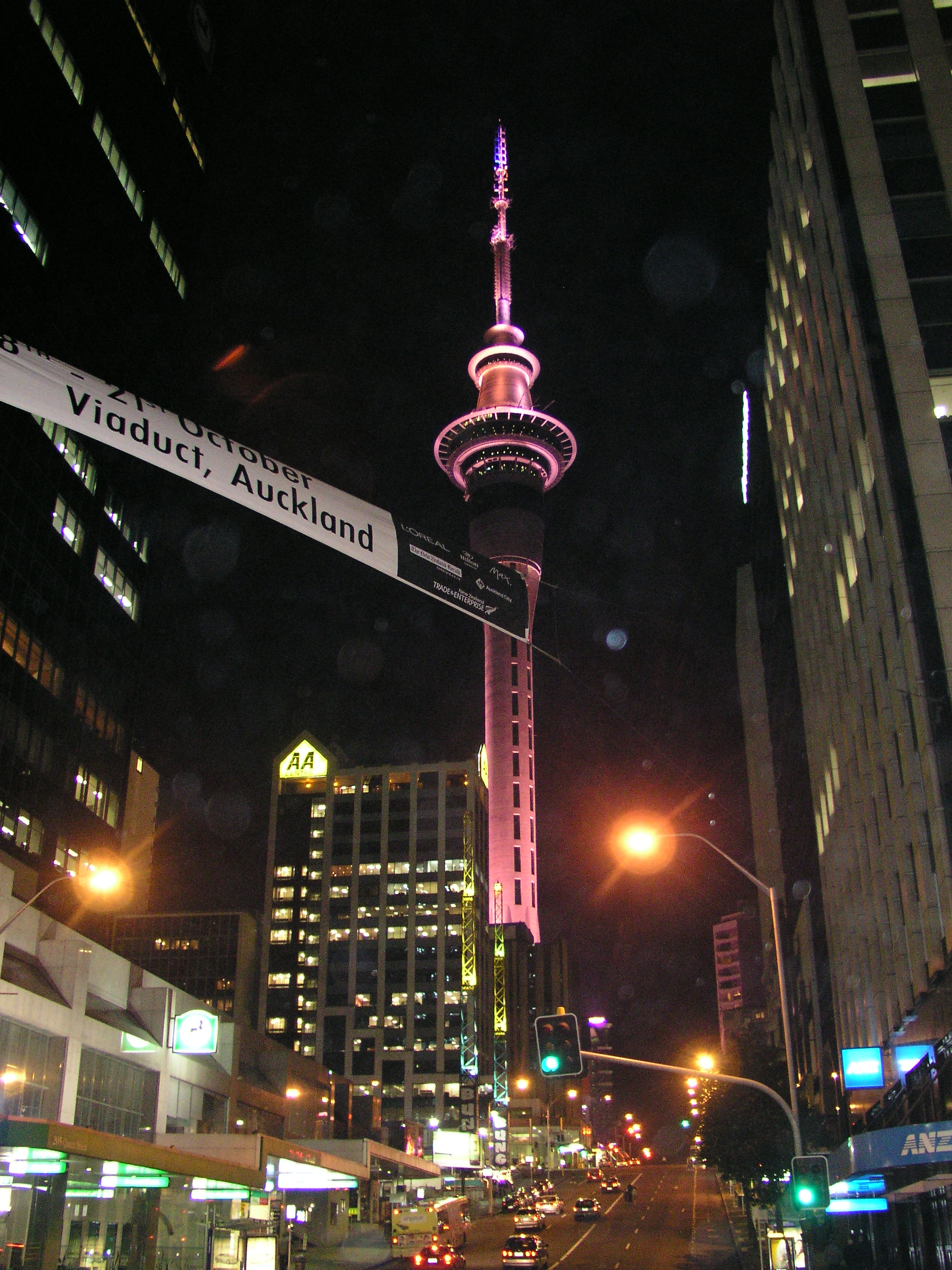
The Sky Tower, a popular attraction in Auckland, serves as an observation tower as well as featuring a revolving restaurant.

The vast majority of international tourist arrivals to New Zealand come through Auckland Airport, which handled 11.5 million international passengers in 2019. Two per cent of visitors arrived by sea as of 2009. Many international tourists spend time in Auckland, Christchurch, Queenstown, Rotorua, and Wellington. Other high-profile destinations include the Bay of Islands, the Waitomo Caves, Aoraki / Mount Cook, and Milford Sound. Many tourists travel considerable distances through the country during their stays, typically using coach lines or hired cars. Though some destinations have seasonal specialities (for winter sports, for example), New Zealand's southern-hemisphere location offers attractions for off-peak northern-hemisphere tourists chasing or avoiding certain seasons. In June 2018 the New Zealand government announced the imposition of a "tourist tax" of around NZ$25 to NZ$35 for international visitors, excluding Australians, many Pacific islanders, and young children. It planned to implement this taxation in 2019 through a newly proposed electronic travel-registration process.

== Infrastructure ==
According to the National Infrastructure Unit of the Treasury, New Zealand "...continues to face challenges to its infrastructure; all forms of infrastructure are long-term investments, and change does not come about easily or quickly." A report prepared for the Association of Consulting and Engineering New Zealand in 2020 claimed that there was an infrastructure deficit of $75 billion (about one quarter of GDP), following decades of under-investment that began in the 1980s.

=== Transport ===
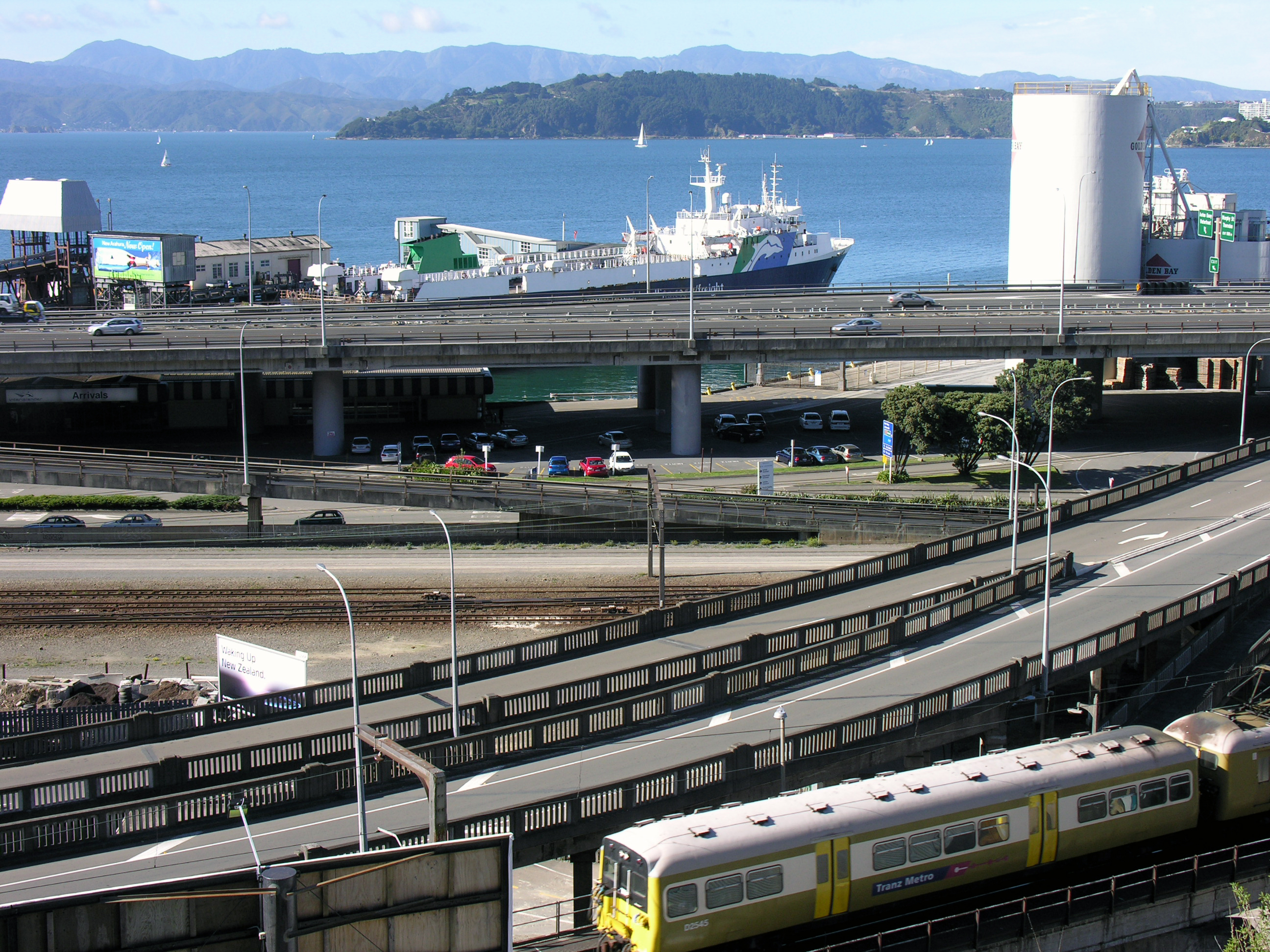
Highways, rail lines and an inter-island ferry in central Wellington

New Zealand's transport infrastructure is "generally well developed."

==== Road network ====
The New Zealand state highway network consists of 11,000 km of road, with 5981.3 km in the North Island and 4924.4 km in the South Island, built and maintained by the NZ Transport Agency, and paid for from general taxation and fuel excise duty. Heavy road users must pay Road User Charges as well, there is limited use of tolling on state highways. There is also 83,000 km of local roads built and maintained by local authorities.

==== Railway network ====
The railway network is owned by state-owned enterprise KiwiRail and consists of 3,898 km of railway line, built to the narrow gauge of 1,067 mm (3 ft 6 in). Of this, 506 km is electrified.

==== Airways ====
There are seven international airports and twenty-eight domestic airports. Air New Zealand, 52% government-owned, is the national carrier and a state owned enterprise. Airways New Zealand, another state owned enterprise, provides air traffic control and communications.

==== Seaports ====
New Zealand has 14 international seaports.

=== Science and technology ===
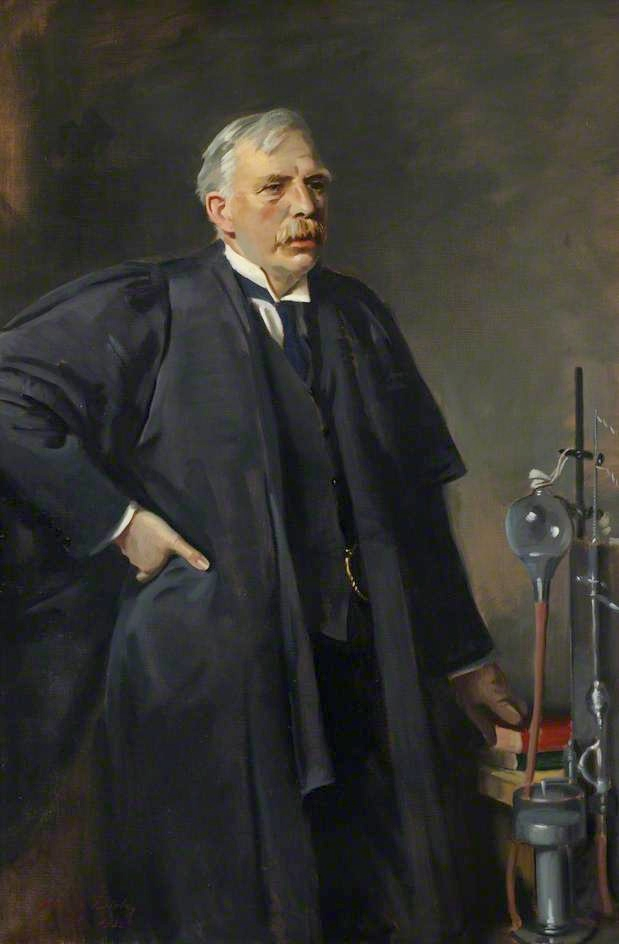
New Zealand physicist Ernest Rutherford has been described as "the father of nuclear physics".

The accumulation of knowledge of agricultural practice and the effects of herbal remedies in the treatment of illness and disease by Māori tohunga as well as their precise observation of nature might be considered an indigenous contribution to science in New Zealand. Cook's voyages in the 1700s and Darwin's in 1835 had important scientific botanical and zoological objectives. The establishment of universities in the 19th century fostered scientific discoveries by notable New Zealanders including Ernest Rutherford for splitting the atom, William Pickering for rocket science, Maurice Wilkins for helping discover DNA, Beatrice Tinsley for galaxy formation, Archibald McIndoe for plastic surgery, Sydney Smith for forensics and Alan MacDiarmid for conducting polymers.

Crown Research Institutes (CRIs) were formed in 1992 from existing government-owned research organisations. Their role is to research and develop new science, knowledge, products and services across the economic, environmental, social and cultural spectrum for the benefit of New Zealand. The total gross expenditure on research and development (R&D) as a proportion of GDP rose to 1.37% in 2018, up from 1.23% in 2015. New Zealand ranks 21st in the OECD for its gross R&D spending as a percentage of GDP. New Zealand was ranked 26th in the Global Innovation Index in 2025.

The New Zealand Space Agency was created by the government in 2016 for space policy, regulation and sector development. Rocket Lab was the first commercial rocket launcher in the country.

Most private and commercial research organisations in New Zealand focus on the agricultural and fisheries sectors. Examples include the Cawthron Institute, the Livestock Improvement Corporation, the Fonterra Research and Development Centre, the Bragato Research Institute, the Kiwifruit Breeding Centre, and B+LNZ Genetics.

=== Telecommunications ===
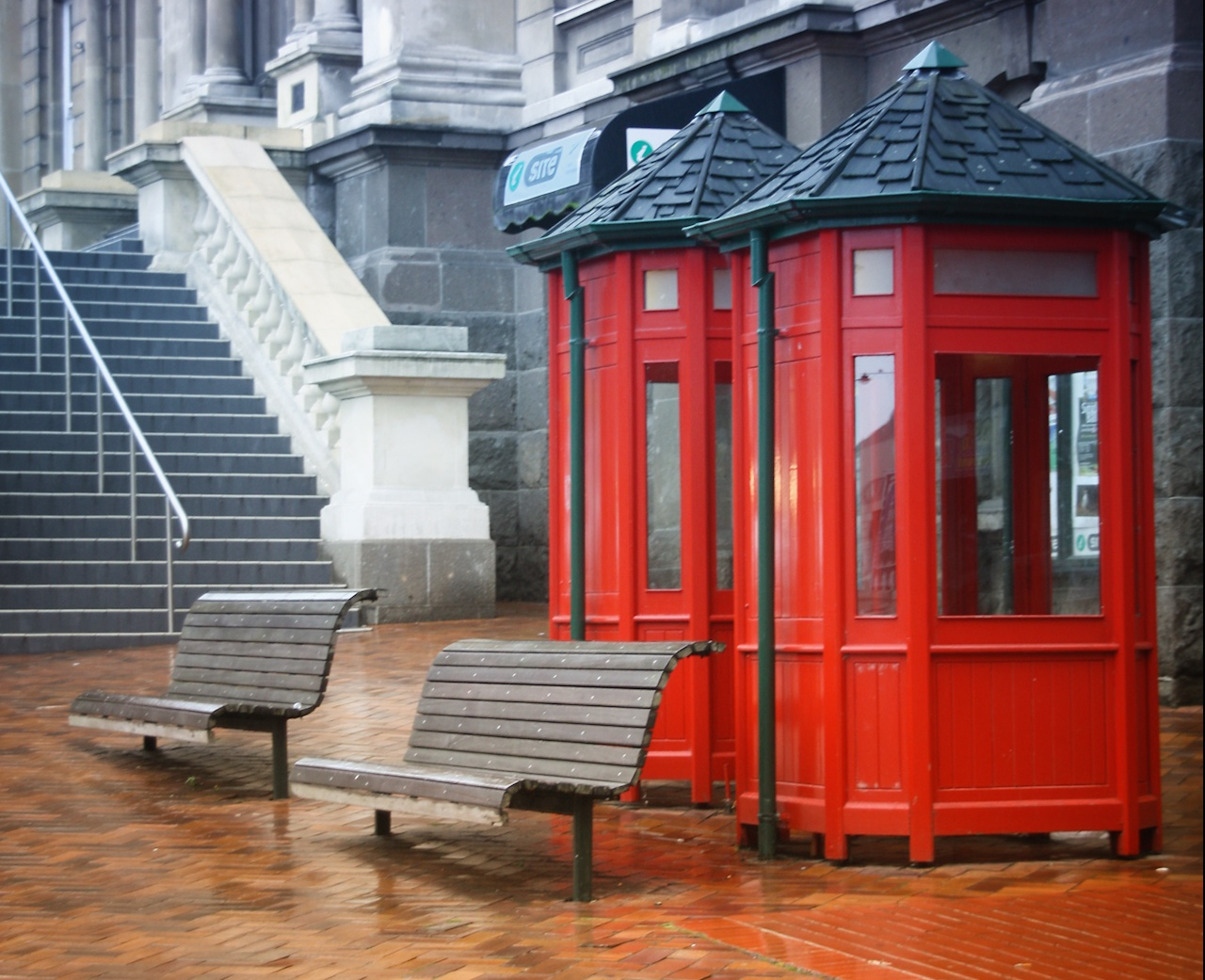
Telephone booths in Dunedin

Present-day telecommunications in New Zealand include telephony, radio, television, and internet usage. A competitive telecommunications market has seen mobile prices drop to some of the lowest in the OECD. The copper wire and fibre cable networks are mostly owned by Chorus Limited, a publicly listed company. Chorus wholesales services to retail providers (such as Spark). In the mobile sector, there are three operators: Spark, One NZ and 2degrees.

==== Internet ====
New Zealand has a high rate of internet use. As of October 2014, there are 1,916,000 broadband connections and 65,000 dial-up connections in New Zealand, of which 1,595,000 are residential and 386,000 are business or government.

The Government has two plans to bring Ultra-Fast Broadband to 97.8% of the population by 2019, and is spending NZ$1.35 billion on public-private partnerships to roll out fibre-to-the-home connection in all main towns and cities with population over 10,000. The program aims to deliver ultra-fast broadband capable of at least 100 Mbit/s download and 50 Mbit/s upload to 75% of New Zealanders by 2019. In total, 1,340,000 households in 26 towns and cities will be connected.

Gigabit internet (1000 Mbit/s download speeds) was made available to the entire Ultra-Fast Broadband (UFB) footprint on 1 October 2016, in an announcement from Chorus.

A$300 million Rural Broadband Initiative (RBI) has also been introduced by the Government, with the aim to bring broadband of at least 5 Mbit/s to 86% of rural customers by 2016.

=== Energy ===
From 1995 to 2013, the energy intensity of the economy per unit of GDP declined by 25 percent. A contributing factor is the growth of relatively less energy-intensive service industries. New Zealand will be potentially among the main winners after the global transition to renewable energy is completed; in 2019 the country placed very high – no. 5 among 156 countries – on the index of geopolitical gains and losses after energy transition (GeGaLo Index).

==== Electricity ====
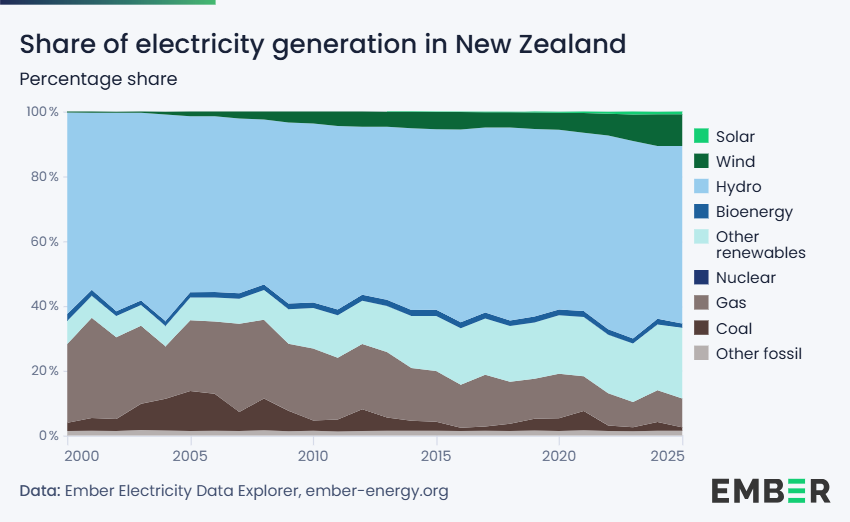
Electricity generation in New Zealand by source - percentage share

The electricity market is regulated by the Electricity Industry Participation Code administered by the Electricity Authority (EA). The electricity sector uses mainly renewable energy sources such as hydropower, geothermal power and increasingly wind energy.

The 83% share of renewable energy sources makes New Zealand one of the most sustainable economies in terms of electricity generation; in terms of total energy consumption in the New Zealand economy, this represents the 30% that comes from renewable sources. New Zealand suffers from a geographical imbalance between electricity production and consumption. The most substantial electricity generation (both existing and as remaining potential) is located on the South Island and to a lesser degree in the central North Island, while the main demand (which is continuing to grow) is in the northern North Island, particularly the Auckland Region. This requires electricity to be transmitted north through a power grid which is reaching its capacity more often.

=== Water ===
As of 2021, almost all of the three waters assets (drinking water, stormwater and wastewater) are owned by local councils and territorial authorities. There are currently 67 different asset-owning organisations in total.

The challenges for local government include funding infrastructure deficits and preparing for large re-investments that are estimated to require $110 billion over the next 30 to 40 years. There are also significant challenges in meeting statutory requirements for the safety of drinking water, and the environmental expectations for management of stormwater and wastewater. Climate change adaptation, and providing for population growth add to these challenges.

== Trade ==
Exports of New Zealand by product category (2019) Chemical products Transportation Machines Mineral products Plastics and rubbers Metals Foodstuffs Precious metals Textiles Instruments Animal products Vegetable products Paper goods Footwear and headwear Miscellaneous Stone and glass Wood products Animal and vegetable bi-products Animal hides Arts and antiques Weapons

As of 2024, New Zealand largest trading partners are China, Australia, the European Union, the United States and Japan. Together, these five partners account for 63% of New Zealand's two-way trade with China alone accounting for over 30% of two-way trade. Total annual exports are worth over US $44 billion well imports are worth over US $49 billion. New Zealand Trade and Enterprise (NZTE) offers strategic advice and support to New Zealand businesses wanting to export goods and services to other countries.

=== Trade agreements ===
New Zealand Free trade agreements in force Free trade agreements concluded but not in force

Since 1960s New Zealand has pursued free trade agreements with many countries to diversify its export markets and increase the competitiveness of New Zealand's exports to the world. As well as reducing barriers to trade, Trade Agreements New Zealand has entered into are designed to ensure existing access is maintained. Trade agreements establish rules by which trade can take place and ensure regulators and officials in countries New Zealand is trading with work closely together.

=== China ===
China is New Zealand's largest trading partner, buying primarily meat, dairy products and pine logs. In 2013, trade between New Zealand and China was worth NZ$16.8 billion. This has occurred primarily because of soaring demand for imported dairy products, following the Chinese milk scandal in 2008. Since then demand for milk products has been so strong that in the 12 months to March 2014, there was a 51% increase in total exports to China. The increase was facilitated by the New Zealand–China Free Trade Agreement which came into force on 1 October 2008. Since that year exports to China have more than tripled.

=== Australia ===
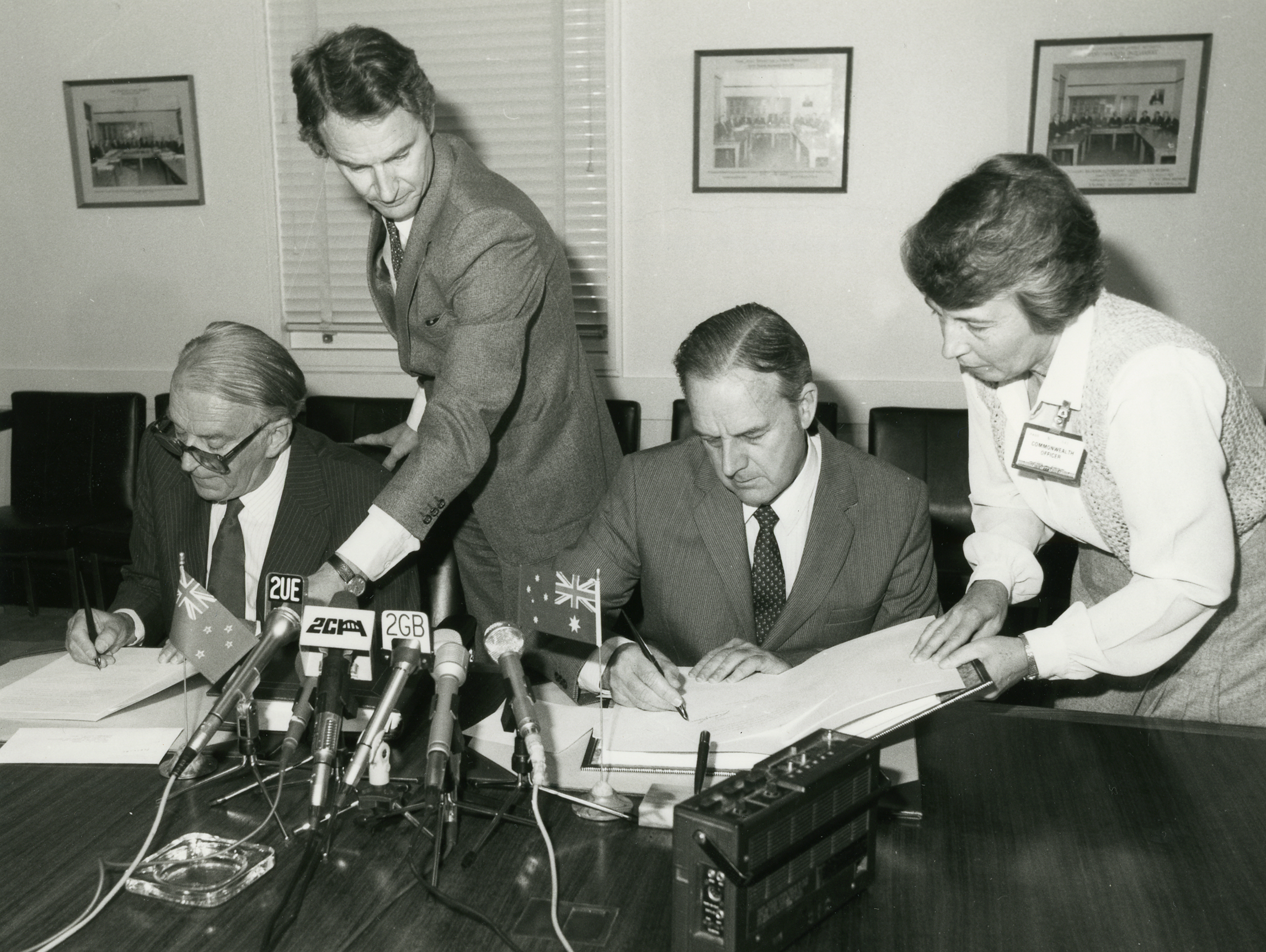
Australia New Zealand Closer Economic Relations Trade Agreement 28 March 1983 – signed by Laurie Francis & Lionel Brown

Australia was New Zealand's largest bilateral trading partner in 2013, when trade between the two countries was worth NZ$25.6 billion, and before China overtook Australia. Economic and trading links between Australia and New Zealand are underpinned by the "Closer Economic Relations" (CER) agreement, which allows for free trade in goods and most services. Since 1990, CER has created a single market of more than 25 million people. Australia is now the destination of 19% of New Zealand's exports, including light crude oil, gold, wine, cheese and timber, as well as a wide range of manufactured items.

The CER also creates a free labour market which allows New Zealand and Australian citizens to live and work freely in each other's country together with mutual recognition of professional qualifications. This means individuals who are registered to practise an occupation in one country can register to practise an equivalent occupation in the other country. Banking regulation and supervision are co-ordinated through the Trans-Tasman Council on Banking Supervision and there are also ongoing discussions about co-ordinating Australian and New Zealand business law.

=== European Union ===
The European Union is New Zealand's third largest trading partner. A growing number of New Zealand companies use the United Kingdom as a base to supply their products to the European market. However trade with the European Union is declining as demand from Asia continues to grow. The EU takes only 8% of New Zealand exports but provides around 12% of imports.

In July 2014, negotiations on the Partnership Agreement on Relations and Cooperation (PARC) between New Zealand and the European Union were concluded. The agreement covers the trade and economic relationship between the EU and New Zealand with a view to further liberalisation of trade and investment and acknowledges the intention of the European Union to upgrade its diplomatic presence in New Zealand with a resident ambassador. In 2024 a New Zealand-European Union free trade agreement entered into force.

=== United States ===
The United States was New Zealand's third largest trading partner in 2013, when bilateral trade between the two countries was valued at NZ$11.8 billion, and before it was overtaken by the EU. New Zealand's main exports to the United States are beef, dairy products and lamb. Imports from the US include specialised machinery, pharmaceutical products, oil and fuel. In addition to trade, there is a high level of corporate and individual investment between the two countries and the US is a major source of tourists coming to New Zealand. In March 2012, the United States had a total of $44 billion invested in New Zealand. A number of US companies have subsidiary branches in New Zealand. Many operate through local agents, with some joint venture associations. The United States Chamber of Commerce is active in New Zealand, with a main office in Auckland and a branch committee in Wellington.

According to the Ministry of Foreign Affairs, New Zealand and the United States "share a deep and longstanding friendship based on a common heritage, shared values and interests, and a commitment to promoting a free, democratic, secure and prosperous world". This common background has not translated into a free trade agreement between the two countries.

=== Japan, Korea and other Asian economies ===
Japan is New Zealand's fourth largest trading partner. In the 21st century, Asian economies have been developing rapidly providing significant demand for New Zealand's exports. Korea, as New Zealand's fifth largest trading partner, is also one of important sources of importation of New Zealand and considered as important export market for New Zealand.

New Zealand also trades with Taiwan, Hong Kong, Malaysia, Indonesia, Singapore, Thailand, India and the Philippines and this now accounts for around 16% of total exports. New Zealand initiated a free trade agreement with Singapore in September 2000 which was extended in 2005 to include Chile and Brunei and is now known as the P4 agreement.

=== Relationship with Pacific Islands ===
The Pacific region with numerous islands is New Zealand's sixth largest trading market and is growing every year. In 2011 exports to Pacific Islands were worth over $1.5 billion up 12% on the previous year. Fiji is the biggest individual market followed very closely by Papua New Guinea, French Polynesia and New Caledonia. Goods exported to the islands include refined oil, construction materials, medicines, sheep meat, milk, butter, fruit and vegetables. New Zealand also assists Pacific Islands with defence and regional security, and with management of the environment and fisheries.

Because of their small size, the Pacific Islands are some of the most vulnerable environments in the world and are on the receiving end of numerous cyclones every year. When disasters occur, they often have severe social and economic effects which last for years. Since 1992, New Zealand has co-operated with Australia and France to respond to disasters in the Pacific. New Zealand provides emergency supplies and transport, funding for roading and housing and the deployment of specialists to affected areas.

Through the Ministry of Foreign Affairs and Trade, New Zealand also provides international aid and development funding to help stimulate sustainable economic development in underdeveloped economies. The New Zealand Aid Programme, allocated about $550m a year, is focused primarily on promoting development in the Pacific. The allocation of $550 million represents about 0.26% of New Zealand's gross national income (GNI).

== Foreign investment ==
New Zealand welcomes and encourages foreign investment, which is overseen by the Overseas Investment Office. In 2014 foreign direct investment totalled NZ$107.69 billion. Between 1989 and 2013, foreign investment increased from NZ$9.7 billion to NZ$101.4 billion – a change of over 1,000%. Between 1989 and 2007, foreign ownership of the New Zealand sharemarket went from 19% to 41% but has since dropped back to 33%.

In 2014, around 7% of all agriculturally productive land in New Zealand was foreign-owned. In 2011, economist Bill Rosenberg claimed that the figure was closer to 9% when including foreign ownership of forestry land. In March 2013, the financial sector, which includes the "big-four" Australian-owned banks, was worth NZ$39.3 billion – the largest share of the NZ$101.4 billion of foreign ownership of New Zealand companies at the time.

=== Impact ===
Between 1997 and 2014, foreign investors made NZ$50.3 billion profit, 68% of which went overseas. The Campaign Against Foreign Control of Aotearoa (CAFCA) says this has a negative impact on the economy, arguing that when foreign investors buy up New Zealand companies, they tend to cut staff and push down wages. It is also argued that growing foreign ownership has done nothing to reduce New Zealand's foreign debt. In 1984, private and public foreign debt was NZ$16 billion (NZ$50 billion in March 2013 dollars), which was less than half New Zealand's GDP at the time. By March 2013, total foreign debt stood at NZ$251 billion, well over 100% of New Zealand's GDP.

At the Singapore International Energy Week (SIEW) conference, leaders from New Zealand and Cambodia highlighted the challenge of maintaining public support for clean energy transitions due to rising electricity costs. They emphasised the importance of balancing affordability with sustainability to ensure long-term success.

== Data ==
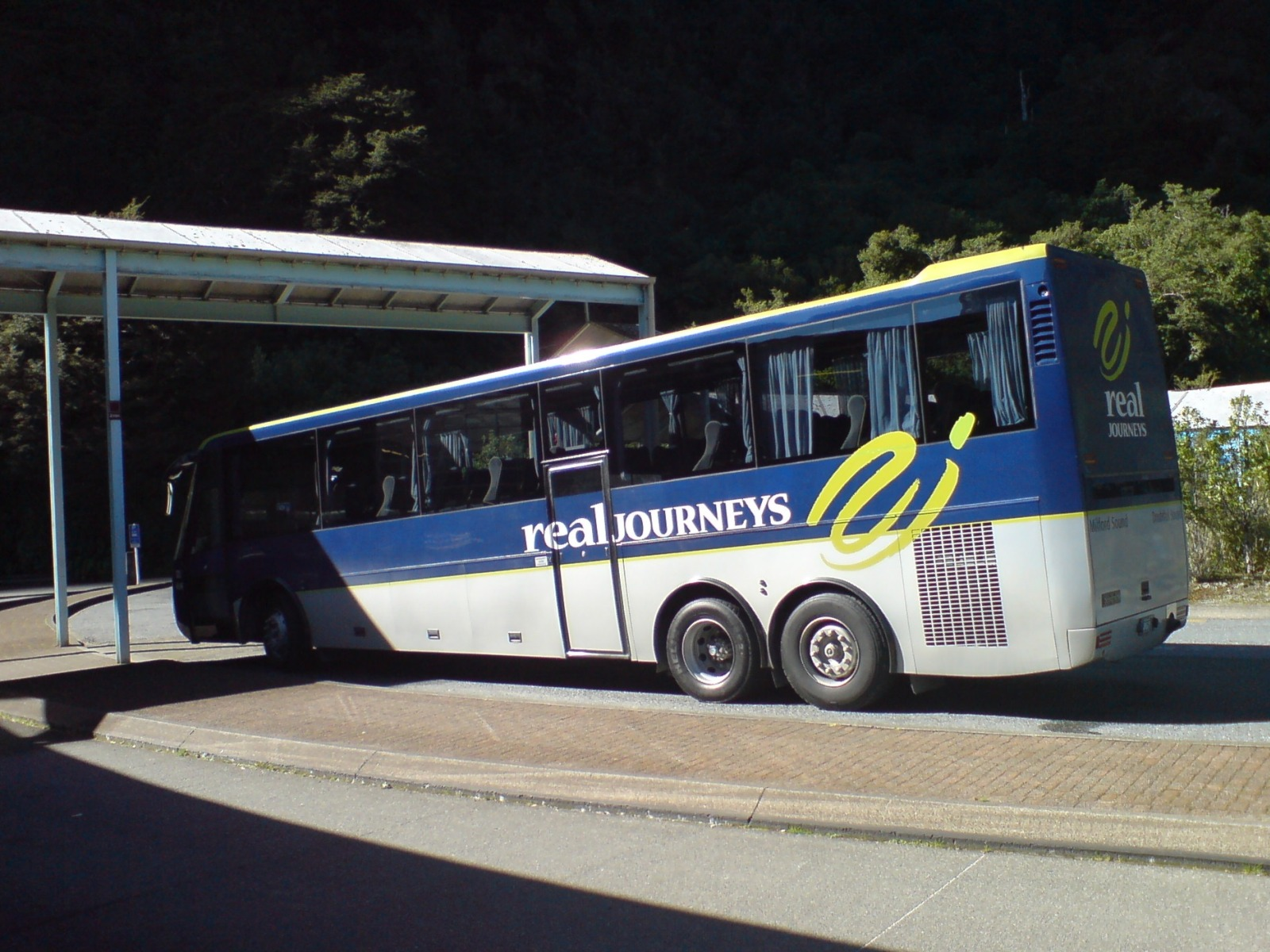
Tourism, like here on the Milford Sound (special bus with viewing gallery), is a major export earner for New Zealand.

The following table shows the main economic indicators in 1980–2022 (with IMF staff estimates in 2023–2026) from the May 2023 IMF World Economic Outlook report. Inflation below 2% is green.

Year	GDP (bil. US$)	GDP per capita (US$)	GDP (bil. US$)	GDP per capita (US$)	GDP growth (real)	Inflation rate (%)	Unemployment (%)	Government debt as % of GDP
Year	(PPP)		(Nominal)		GDP growth (real)	Inflation rate (%)	Unemployment (%)	Government debt as % of GDP
1980	28.5	9,176.3	22.6	7,257.5	▲1.0%	▲17.1%	4.0%	n/a
1981	▲32.1	▲10,287.7	▲23.5	▲7,514.1	▲3.0%	▲15.5%	▼3.9%	n/a
1982	▲35.1	▲11,150.8	▼23.2	▼7,381.3	▲2.9%	▲16.1%	▲4.4%	n/a
1983	▲36.4	▲11,463.5	▼22.5	▼7,074.6	▼-0.1%	▲7.4%	▲6.2%	n/a
1984	▲40.4	▲12,565.3	▼22.4	▼6,970.9	▲6.9%	▲6.1%	▲7.2%	n/a
1985	▲42.1	▲12,993.8	▼22.5	▼6,953.6	▲1.2%	▲15.4%	▼3.9%	64.1%
1986	▲43.8	▲13,373.6	▲27.4	▲8,385.8	▲1.8%	▲13.2%	▲4.2%	▲68.5%
1987	▲45.9	▲13,915.0	▲37.0	▲11,205.9	▲2.4%	▲15.8%	4.2%	▼62.9%
1988	▲47.8	▲14,353.2	▲45.5	▲13,663.6	▲0.6%	▲6.4%	▲5.8%	▼54.7%
1989	▲49.9	▲14,826.9	▼44.0	▼13,079.0	▲0.4%	▲5.7%	▲7.3%	▲55.0%
1990	▲51.8	▲15,204.9	▲45.8	▲13,447.6	0.0%	▲6.1%	▲8.0%	▲55.4%
1991	▲52.8	▼15,111.8	▼43.4	▼12,424.8	▼ -1.3%	▲2.6%	▲10.6%	▲58.0%
1992	▲54.4	▲15,401.1	▼41.5	▼11,752.0	▲0.7%	▲1.0%	▲10.7%	▲58.7%
1993	▲58.6	▲16,401.4	▲44.8	▲12,537.7	▲5.2%	▲1.3%	▼9.8%	▼54.6%
1994	▲63.2	▲17,452.4	▲52.9	▲14,612.4	▲5.6%	▲1.7%	▼8.4%	▼48.9%
1995	▲67.7	▲18,414.5	▲62.2	▲16,932.7	▲4.9%	▲3.8%	▼6.5%	▼43.5%
1996	▲71.7	▲19,212.1	▲69.1	▲18,506.4	▲4.1%	▲2.3%	▼6.3%	▼37.3%
1997	▲74.8	▲19,763.8	▼68.9	▼18,206.2	▲2.4%	▲1.2%	▲6.9%	▼34.6%
1998	▲75.9	▲19,893.4	▼56.8	▼14,889.8	▲0.4%	▲1.3%	▲7.7%	▼34.5%
1999	▲80.4	▲20,961.2	▲58.9	▲15,348.8	▲4.5%	▲ -0.1%	▼7.1%	▼32.0%
2000	▲85.7	▲22,207.2	▼54.1	▼14,021.9	▲4.2%	▲2.6%	▼6.2%	▼30.0%
2001	▲89.9	▲23,121.0	▼53.1	▼13,669.3	▲2.5%	▲2.6%	▼5.5%	▼28.2%
2002	▲95.6	▲24,183.4	▲62.1	▲15,706.7	▲4.7%	▲2.7%	▼5.3%	▼26.4%
2003	▲101.8	▲25,263.5	▲82.4	▲20,460.3	▲4.4%	▲1.8%	▼4.8%	▼24.7%
2004	▲109.6	▲26,793.4	▲101.6	▲24,848.8	▲4.8%	▲2.3%	▼4.0%	▼22.5%
2005	▲116.6	▲28,196.4	▲113.3	▲27,385.5	▲3.2%	▲3.0%	▼3.8%	▼20.8%
2006	▲123.6	▲29,531.6	▼109.7	▼26,219.9	▲2.8%	▲3.4%	▲3.9%	▼18.4%
2007	▲131.4	▲31,091.1	▲134.9	▲31,914.3	▲3.5%	▲2.4%	▼3.6%	▼16.3%
2008	▲133.5	▲31,311.6	▲135.4	▼31,762.9	▼ -0.4%	▲4.0%	▲4.0%	▲19.0%
2009	▼132.8	▼30,843.0	▼121.7	▼28,270.4	▼ -1.1%	▲2.1%	▲5.9%	▲24.3%
2010	▲136.7	▲31,402.2	▲145.4	▲33,393.0	▲1.7%	▲2.3%	▲6.2%	▲29.7%
2011	▲142.0	▲32,376.0	▲166.9	▲38,061.5	▲1.8%	▲4.0%	▼6.1%	▲34.7%
2012	▲144.4	▲32,733.7	▲175.0	▲39,683.6	▲2.5%	▲1.1%	▲6.5%	▲35.7%
2013	▲157.7	▲35,467.7	▲187.1	▲42,081.3	▲2.3%	▲1.1%	▼5.8%	▼34.6%
2014	▲167.2	▲36,995.9	▲200.2	▲44,284.7	▲3.8%	▲1.2%	▼5.4%	▼34.2%
2015	▲170.7	▼36,995.3	▼176.3	▼38,224.6	▲3.6%	▲0.3%	5.4%	34.2%
2016	▲185.1	▲39,254.6	▲185.9	▲39,415.0	▲3.9%	▲0.6%	▼5.2%	▼33.4%
2017	▲197.1	▲40,932.7	▲203.6	▲42,290.0	▲3.3%	▲1.9%	▼4.8%	▼31.1%
2018	▲208.7	▲42,564.4	▲209.6	▲42,757.1	▲3.5%	▲1.6%	▼4.3%	▼28.1%
2019	▲218.7	▲43,864.4	▲210.8	▼42,274.2	▲3.1%	▲1.6%	▼4.1%	▲31.8%
2020	▼218.5	▼42,970.5	▼210.3	▼41,341.1	▼ -1.4%	▲1.7%	▲4.6%	▲43.3%
2021	▲241.4	▲47,235.7	▲249.7	▲48,861.5	▲5.6%	▲3.9%	▼3.8%	▲47.5%
2022	▲264.6	▲51,622.6	▼242.4	▼47,284.1	▲2.4%	▲7.2%	▼3.3%	▼47.2%
Projected
2023	▲276.0	▲52,676.5	▲249.0	▲47,536.7	▲0.6%	▲5.7%	▲3.7%	▼45.9%
2024	▲285.6	▲53,797.3	▲257.6	▲48,530.8	▲1.0%	▲3.1%	▲5.0%	▲47.4%
2025	▲296.3	▲55,145.9	▲266.8	▲49,644.8	▲2.0%	▲2.5%	▲5.4%	▲48.7%
2026	▲309.2	▲56,843.4	▲277.7	▲51,049.1	▲2.4%	▲2.4%	▲5.2%	▲48.8%

The real GDP per capita growth was -2.0% in 2024 and -0.4% in 2025.

Industrial production growth rate
5.9% (2004) / 1.5% (2007)
Household income or consumption by percentage share

- Lowest 10%: 0.3% (1991)
- Highest 10%: 29.8% (1991)

Agriculture – products
Wheat, barley, potatoes, pulses, fruits, vegetables; wool, beef, dairy products; fish
Exports – commodities
Dairy products, meat, wood and wood products, fish, machinery
Imports – commodities
Machinery and equipment, vehicles and aircraft, petroleum, electronics, textiles, plastics
Electricity

- Consumption: 34.88 TWh (2001) / 37.39 TWh (2006)
- Production: 38.39 TWh (2004) / 42.06 TWh (2006)
- Exports: 0 kWh (2006)
- Imports: 0 kWh (2006)

Electricity – production by source

- Hydro: 60% (2020)
- Geothermal: 17% (2020)
- Wind: 5% (2020)
- Fossil fuel: 17% (2020)
- Nuclear: 0% (2020)
- Other: 3.4% (2010)

Oil

- Production: 42,160 barrels (6,703 m^{3}) 2001 / 25,880 barrels (4,115 m^{3}) 2006
- Consumption: 132,700 barrels (21,100 m^{3}) 2001 / 156,000 barrels (24,800 m^{3}) 2006
- Exports: 30,220 barrels (4,805 m^{3}) 2001 / 15,720 barrels (2,499 m^{3}) 2004
- Imports: 119,700 barrels (19,030 m^{3}) 2001 / 140,900 barrels (22,400 m^{3}) 2004
- Proven reserves: 89.62 million barrels (14,248,000 m^{3}) January 2002

Exchange rates
New Zealand dollars (NZ$) per US$1 – 1.4771 (2016), 1.2652 (2012), 1.3869 (2005), 1.5248 (2004), 1.9071 (2003), 2.1622 (2002), 2.3788 (2001), 2.2012 (2000), 1.8886 (1999), 1.8632 (1998), 1.5083 (1997), 1.4543 (1996), 1.5235 (1995)

== See also ==
- List of companies of New Zealand
- Information technology industry in New Zealand
- Economy of Oceania
- Foreign trade of New Zealand
- Median household income in Australia and New Zealand
- Ministry of Business, Innovation and Employment
- New Zealand Council of Trade Unions
- Ngai Tahu holdings and Ngāi Tahu trading enterprises
- Reserve Bank of New Zealand

== Sources ==
- Energy in New Zealand 2023. Ministry of Business, Innovation and Employment. August 2023. eISSN 2324-5913. ISSN 2537-9372.
- Russell, Marcia (1996). Revolution: New Zealand from Fortress to Free Market. Hodder Moa Beckett. ISBN 1-86958-428-7.
