= Look-through company =

New Zealand limited liability tax structure

A look-through company (LTC) is a kind of tax structure for New Zealand companies with limited liability, which allows the company in question to transfer its income and expenditure to its shareholders directly. The LTC has replaced the previously popular loss attributing qualifying company (LAQC) and will be a simpler alternative to limited partnership (LP); however, this new structure differs in a number of key areas.

== Introduction ==
In May 2010, as part of the 2010 New Zealand budget, LAQCs were abolished. LAQCs had been popular among property investors. Community Investors anxiously awaited the appearance of any alternative. In December 2010, new legislation was introduced which approved a new type of companies—or rather, a new kind of taxation structure for companies in the vein of the old LAQCs. These were to be called look-through companies. The draft law was published yet on 15 October 2010, and successfully passed one and a half months later. The legislation was effective from 1 April 2011.

== Features ==
An LTC is the same as the traditional limited liability company (LLC), established in accordance with the New Zealand Companies Act of 1993, apart from taxation of the company's income. An LTC is unlike a typical company in that the income and expenditure of the company are expressly in the hands of the shareholders. In fiscal terms, this creates a transparent mechanism that is identical to the New Zealand limited partnership. In contrast to LAQCs, LTC shareholders have an obligation to pay taxes on the profit of the company personally, as well as being able to claim losses generated by the company against their other income for tax purposes.

- An LTC is a legal entity under the usual rules of management and operation of companies of limited liability.
- In the realm of taxation, LTC is more transparent and the owners of an LTC will be considered the owners of the company's assets in order to calculate income tax.
- Income, expenses, tax credits, deductions, gains and losses of the company are transferred to its owners in proportion to their share in the company.

To obtain the status of the LTC, a company must meet the following criteria:

- A company which resides (tax-wise) in New Zealand; this residency is determined by the location of the company itself and not its shareholders.
- The company's shares can only belong to individuals or managers of a trust, or other LTC, to be shares of the same class and to give equal rights to all shareholders.
- The number of shareholders cannot exceed five.

Income from LTCs is taxed after deducting the expenses of the company. The share of these revenues and expenses is transferred to shareholders according to their share in the company. Earnings from the company are taxed at the personal tax rate, even if it is more or less than the standard income tax rate for New Zealand companies. This is a significant point of difference with the LAQC. The rule limits the amount of damages similar to those that apply to limited liability companies. Owners can take into account only the economically justified costs. Losses that cannot be claimed in a given period can be extended to subsequent years (periods), but only within the amount of participation of the shareholder. LTCs deliver declarations showing the distribution of income and expenses to shareholders.

== Comparison with LAQCs and limited partnerships (LPs) ==
Unlike LAQCs, with an LTC shareholders can claim damages only on a scale proportionate to that individual's share in the company. However, losses in both types of companies may be carried over to subsequent periods: if the amount of damages the company passed to a shareholder who exceeds the amount of participation in the company, this difference carries over to next year. Shareholders of now-defunct LAQCs may elect to transition into an LTC.

Unlike an LP all shareholders have equal rights and their number is limited to five. Also, in partnership, general financial entities may participate, while in LTC stockholders may only be natural persons or administering trusts (or other LTCs). The general principles of LPs and LTCs are similar in the sense that the costs and revenues of both entities are transferred to shareholders. Nevertheless, the LP has more complex tax rules and reporting, and there is no ability to transfer losses to later periods.

== See also ==
- Taxation in New Zealand
