= Loss attributing qualifying company =

A loss attributing qualifying company (LAQC) was a type of company which, by New Zealand law, passed on any losses to its shareholders. The shareholders could then offset these losses against their personal income for tax purposes.

Following the 2010 New Zealand budget, legislation passed was December 2010 that made changes to the rules for qualifying companies (QCs) and loss attributing qualifying companies (LAQCs).

LAQCs were not able to attribute losses to shareholders for income years starting on or after 1 April 2011 and there are no new QC or LAQC elections. Existing LAQCs automatically became QCs (without the ability to attribute losses) at the start of the income year starting 1 April 2011.

They may elect either to remain a QC or can transition into a look-through company (LTC) at no tax cost in certain circumstances or can also transition into another tax entity, such as a partnership, limited partnership or sole tradership with no tax cost.
