= 2010 New Zealand budget =

New Zealand budget 2010

- Submitted by: Bill English
- Parliament: Parliament of New Zealand
- Party: National
- Total revenue: ▲$56.4 billion
- Total expenditures: ▲$64.8 billion
- Deficit: ▼ -$6.9 billion
- Debt: ▼$26.6 billion (Net) ▼14.1% (Net debt to GDP)
- ^{ǂ}Numbers in italics are projections.

The New Zealand budget for fiscal year 2010-2011 was presented to the New Zealand House of Representatives by Finance Minister Bill English on 20 May 2010.

This was the second budget Bill English has presented as Minister of Finance.

== Outline ==
=== Tax changes ===
The main feature of the 2010 Budget was a tax package that lowered income taxes, reduced the company tax rate to 28%, and raised GST to 15%. There were increases to Superannuation, Working for Families and Benefits to compensate for the GST increase.

New income tax rates from 2010 are:

Taxable income band	Old PAYE (1 April 2010 – 30 September 2010)	New PAYE (from 1 October 2010)
$0 – $14,000	12.5%	10.5%
$14,001 – $48,000	21%	17.5%
$48,0001 – $70,000	33%	30%
$70,001+	38%	33%

Depreciation on buildings with a life exceeding 50 years was removed, resulting in an increase of tax paid on property, and Loss Attributing Qualifying Companies were abolished and replaced with Look-through company, subject to much tighter rules.

The 2010 Budget included new spending of $1.8 billion in health, education, research and broadband rollout.

The Budget forecast a return to fiscal surplus in 2016.
