= Taranaki Basin =

Onshore-offshore Cretaceous rift basin on the West Coast of New Zealand

The Taranaki Basin is an onshore-offshore Cretaceous rift basin on the West Coast of New Zealand. Development of rifting was the result of extensional stresses during the breakup of Gondwanaland. The basin later underwent fore-arc and intra-arc basin development, due to the subduction of the Pacific Plate under the Australian Plate at the Hikurangi Subduction System. The basin covers approximately 100,000 km^{2} of which the majority is offshore. The basin contains mostly marine sediment, with significant terrestrial sediment from the Late Cretaceous to the Eocene. The majority of New Zealand's oil and gas production occurs within the basin, with over 600 wells and approximately 20 oil and gas fields being drilled.

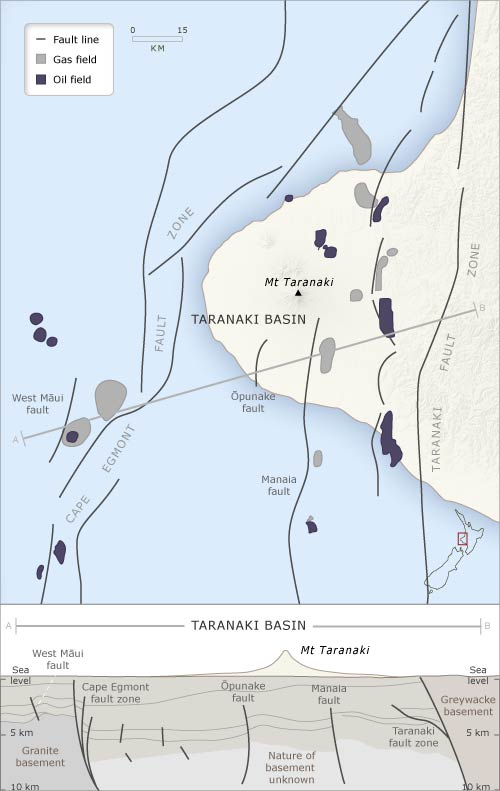
Broad Map and General Cross Section of the Taranaki Basin. Prepared by the Dept. of Lands and Survey. Source: Land Information New Zealand (LINZ). Mount Taranaki is in the middle.

== Overview ==
The Taranaki Basin lies on the West coast of the North Island of New Zealand in the Taranaki Region, and is approximately 400 km west of the current Pacific-Australian plate boundary. It covers approximately 100,000 km^{2} and contains up to 9 km in sediment. The basin is divided into two main components, the Western Platform and Eastern Mobile Belt, formerly known as the Taranaki Graben. The Western Platform is a relatively undeformed, stable block compared to the Eastern Mobile Belt. While it underwent block faulting throughout the Late Cretaceous to the Eocene, it has been stable since. This section of the basin contains between 2000 and 5000m of sediment, dating from the Late Cretaceous to present. The Western Platform is separated from the Eastern Mobile Belt on the East by the Cape Egmont fault zone, a northwest trending fault zone consisting of multiple subparallel reverse and normal faults. The Eastern Mobile Belt consists of multiple grabens and contains multiple compressional features, including overthrusts, reverse faults, and inversion structures. The Eastern Mobile Belt extends from this fault zone to the north-south trending Taranaki fault zone, which is adjacent to the a large upthrust basement block that divides the Taranaki Basin from the later-formed, eastward Wanganui Basin.

Nature

The Blue whale, Southern right whale and the critically endangered Maui's dolphin are living beings in the sea in Taranaki Basin, or live near the coast of Taranaki. For the Blue whale it is a breeding ground.

== Tectonic Evolution ==
=== Basement Structure ===
Pre-rift rocks in the Taranaki Basin are typically considered basement rocks. The Taranaki basement is extremely heterogeneous, with metasediments and granites representing the original Gondwana Craton, and granitoids, volcanic and volcano-sedimentary rocks, and accretionary complexes representing later accretionary terrains and plutons.

=== Rifting ===
Formation of the Taranaki Basin initiated in the Late Cretaceous, due to the separation of Australia and Zealandia during the breakup of Gondwanaland. This breakup caused the formation of the Tasman Sea, along with multiple extensional basins on the New Zealand subcontinent, including an intra-plate rift that formed the Taranaki Rift, which would develop into the Taranaki Basin.

Syn-rift sediments were deposited within rift controlled grabens across the basin, and are separated from the basement rock by a regional unconformity. These sedimentary layers contain faulting that is indicative of extension during deposition. They include sequencing from non-marine conglomerates to sand, silt, and then coals.

=== Drift ===
After the end of extension in the Late Cretaceous, the Taranaki Basin became a passive margin setting, with drift resulting in marine transgression. Subsidence of the basin was slow enough to allow for the massive accumulation of sediment during the Paleocene and Eocene. These Paleocene and Eocene sandstones contain the majority of the petroleum reserves found within the basin. During drift, a decline in sediment deposition occurred, with a thinning of layers from the Cretaceous to the Eocene. The sediments in this sequence lead from coastal plain deposits, to shallow marine sands, to shelf sediments.

== Stratigraphy ==
=== Pakawau Group ===
The Pakawau group contains the oldest sediment within the Taranaki Basin, deposited between the Late Cretaceous and Paleocene. It includes the Rakopi Formation (85-75 Ma) and the North Cape Formation (75-65 Ma). Rocks within this group include fluvial sandstones and marine, transgressive sandstones. In some areas within the basin, this group is more than 2000 m thick. It overlies the mostly igneous and metasedimentary basement.

=== Kapuni Group ===
The Kapuni group contains multiple formations that span the Paleocene and Eocene. These formations are, in ascending order, the Farewell Formation, Kaimiro Formation, Mangahewa Formation, and McKee Formation.

The Farewell Formation (65-55 Ma) contains mostly fluvial sandstone. The Kaimiro Formation (55-45 Ma) contains mostly poor to moderately sorted alluvial and coastal plain sandstones with some inter-bedded micaceous and carbonaceous mudstones and siltstones. This formation is not fossiliferous. The Mangahewa Formation (45-34 Ma) consists mostly of sandstone, siltstone, mudstone and bituminous coal. This formation has good reservoir sandstones. The McKee Formation (38-33 Ma) is easily recognizable by its coarse-grained, well sorted sandstones. Small clasts of mudstones and coal can be found throughout this formation.

=== Tikorangi Limestone ===
The Tikorangi Limestone (33-23 Ma) is composed of mostly sandy, deep-water limestone along with calcareous mudstone interbedded with calcareous sandstone. It forms a conformable contact with an 8m thick layer of glauconitic sandstone, The Matapo Sandstone Member, which lies above the formation.

=== Mahoenui Group ===
The Mahoenui Group consists of calcareous mudstones, with thinly interbedded sandstones, siltstones, and limestones. Sediment in this group was deposited during the Late Oligocene and the Early Miocene.

=== Mokau Group ===
The Mokau Group is composed of shoreface sandstones with some interbedded siltstones. Layers of fluvial conglomerate and coal can be found as well. The sediment in this group represents deposition in the Early Miocene.

=== Wai-iti Group ===
The Mohakatino Formation (~17-13 Ma) is composed of silty mudstones, with andesitic, volcaniclastic sandstones. The Mt Messenger Formation (11-9 Ma), also known as the Waikiekie Formation, is a massive sandstone unit. The Urenui Formation (9-5 Ma) is a silty mudstone that contains occasional conglomerates.

=== Matemateāonga Formation ===
The Matemateāonga Formation (7-5 Ma) consists of shellbeds, siltstones and sandstones with interbedded conglomerate. This formation represents deposition during the Late Miocene and Early Pliocene.

=== Recent Deposits ===
Andesitic volcanism began within the basin in the Miocene, and has continued until the present day.

== Hydrocarbons ==
The majority of New Zealand's petroleum production has been within the Taranaki Basin. Over 1.8 billion barrels of BOE have been discovered, of which 70% is gas. More than 400 wells have been drilled throughout the basin, in about 20 fields. A wide variety of petroleum play types, mostly structural, can be seen throughout the basin due to its complex history. The main trap styles found within the basin are fault-dependent closures, inversion anticlines, and overthrusts.

Source Rocks

The majority of oil produced from the Taranaki basement are sourced from coals and marine shales from the Late Cretaceous and Paleogene.

Current oil and gas fields within the basin

- Mangahewa Field
- Maui Field
- Kapuni Field
- Cardiff/Radno Field
- Turangi/Ohanga Field
- Pohokura Field
- McKee Field
- Tuhua Field
- Tui oil field
- Kupe Field
- Rimu Field
- Maari Field
- Kaimiro Field
- Cheal Field
- Moturoa Field
- Karewa Field
- Ngatoro Field
- Waihapa Field
- Toko Field

== See also ==
- Geology of Taranaki
