= Oil and gas industry in New Zealand =

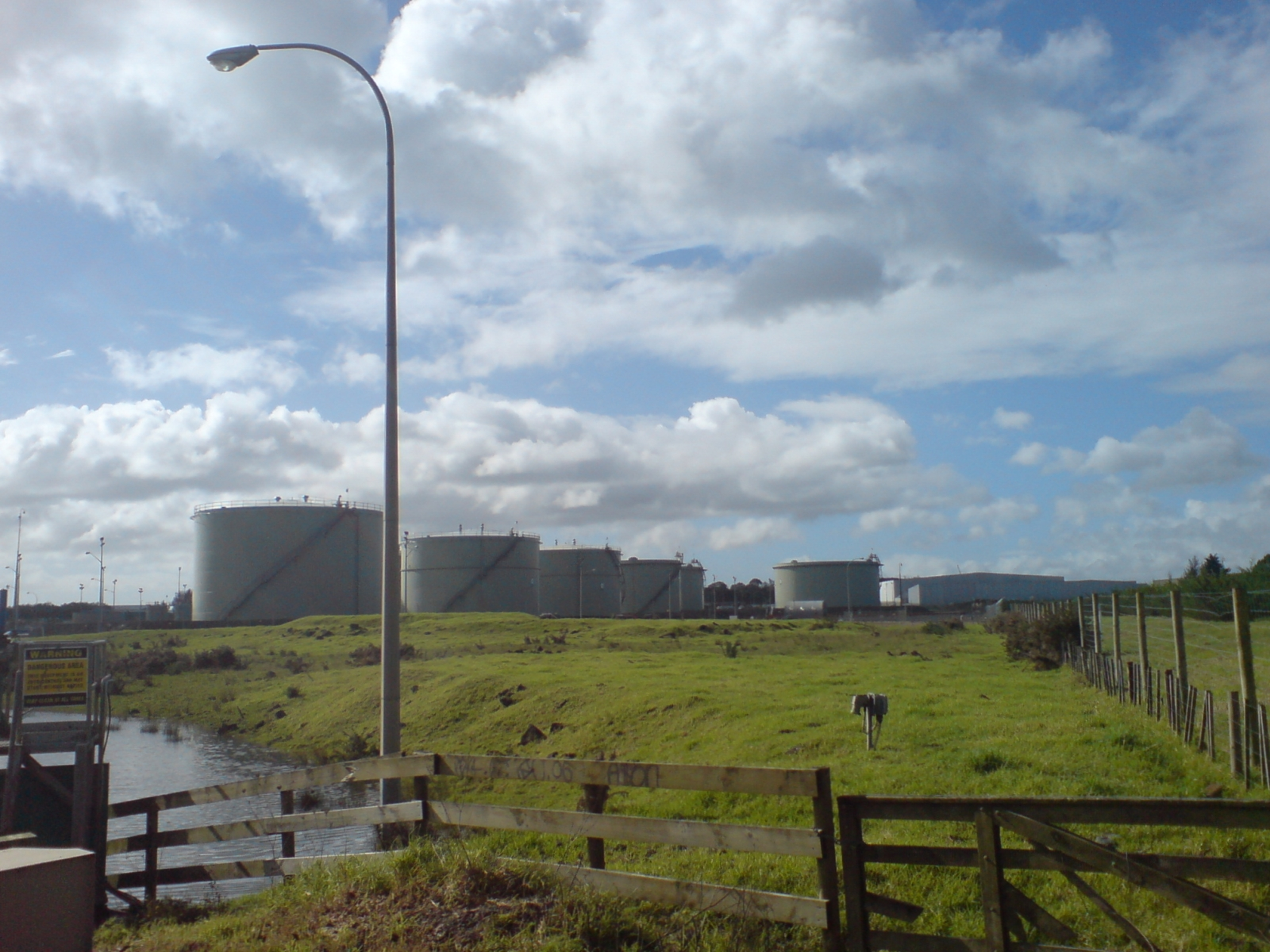
Storage tanks at the Wiri terminal of the Marsden Point to Auckland pipeline for transport fuels

The oil and gas industry in New Zealand explores and develops oil and gas fields, and produces and distributes petroleum products and natural gas.

New Zealand has had one significant oil refinery, the Marsden Point Oil Refinery, which operated from 1964 to 2022. The site is now used for importing refined fuel, about half of which comes from South Korea, and a third from Singapore, as of 2025.

In 2022, New Zealand's net self-sufficiency in oil (production divided by consumption) was 12%, i.e. the country imported much more crude and refined oil than it exported. All crude oil extracted in New Zealand was (and is) exported as the Marsden Point refinery was not suited to processing it. In 2018, 60 petajoules of crude were produced in New Zealand, 380 PJ of petroleum products imported (most of it crude), and 283 PJ consumed. The difference is exported or used for international travel (aviation fuel and similar).

Oil and gas are produced from 21 petroleum licenses / permits, all in the Taranaki basin. The most important fields are Kapuni, Maui, Pohokura and Kupe. Exploration for oil and gas reserves includes the Great South Basin and offshore areas near Canterbury and Gisborne.

There are 2,600 kilometres of high-pressure natural gas transmission pipelines in the North Island. Most of these are owned and operated by First Gas, including the Maui pipeline, a 307 km pipeline that carries 78% of all natural gas produced in New Zealand. The low-pressure gas pipelines that distribute gas to end users are owned by First Gas (Northland, Waikato, Bay of Plenty, Gisborne, Kapiti Coast), Vector (Auckland), Powerco (Hawke's Bay, Taranaki, Manawatu, Wellington) and GasNet (Wanganui).

The largest retailers of gas are Contact Energy and Vector. There is no natural gas transmission in the South Island. New Zealand has one underground gas storage facility, the Ahuroa Gas Storage Facility. The major industry body is Energy Resources Aotearoa.

== History ==
In 1865, the Alpha well was drilled near Mikotahi at New Plymouth. This was the first oil well in what is now the Commonwealth and one of the first in the world. A petroleum industry developed at Moturoa, including producing wells and refineries. The last refinery there was closed in 1972. The field continues to produce small quantities of oil.

The Kapuni gas field in South Taranaki was discovered in 1959 and brought into production in 1970. The North Island natural gas network started operating in 1970, initially supplying Kapuni gas to Auckland, Hamilton, New Plymouth, Wanganui, Palmerston North and Wellington. The off-shore Maui field was discovered in 1969 and brought into production in 1978. This supported the development of many large energy projects, including gas fired power stations at New Plymouth and Huntly, ammonia-urea plant at Kapuni, gas to methanol plant at Waitara and the synthetic petrol plant at Motunui.

In 2018, the Sixth Labour Government announced that no new permits would be issued for offshore oil exploration. Later that year, the Labour-led government passed the Crown Minerals (Petroleum) Amendment Act 2018, which banned the granting of new offshore oil and gas permits as part of the Labour-led government's climate strategy of transitioning away from fossil fuels.

In 2021, the last of the deep sea oil and gas exploration permits outside Taranaki was surrendered. This was the Totara permit held by NZOG for an area in the Great South Basin of the south coast of the South Island. Following the collapse of the Taramind Taranaki's Tui oil field which led the New Zealand Crown to spend NZ$443 million on decommissioning costs, the Labour Government passed the Crown Minerals (Decommissioning and Other Matters) Amendment Act 2021 which obligated petroleum permit holders to fully fund and carry out decommissioning operations at oil wells.

In late July 2025, the Sixth National Government passed legislation reversing the previous Labour government's ban on issuing new offshore gas and oil exploration permits. It also reduced petrol company's liability for the costs of decommissioning and cleaning up oil wells and infrastructure.

By May 2026, estimated proven gas reserves had fallen to 605 PJ, down two-thirds since 2021. Only about half the decrease was from extraction; the remainder came from reserves being downgraded, e.g. from proven (90% probability of extraction) to possible (50% probability of extraction) or further. Since the 2018 ban on offshore permits, nearly $2 billion had been invested in the drilling of new wells, to relatively little success.

== Oil and gas fields ==
New Zealand gas production by field

Proven and probable (2P or P50) reserves, ultimate and remaining, as at 1 January 2019

Producing fields

Field	Ultimate oil recoverable (million bbl)	Remaining oil reserves (million bbl)	Ultimate gas recoverable (PJ)	Remaining gas reserves (PJ)
Kapuni	70	4	1,142	143
Kupe	21	7	533	311
Maari	44	6		
Mangahewa	16	10	648	403
Maui	227	5	4,331	110
McKee	47	0	264	63
Pohokura	62	15	1,563	714
Tui	47	6		
Turangi	10	6	376	277
Others	56	12	315	80
Total	600	71	9,173	2,102

== Prospecting off the South Island coast ==
Approximate location of the Great South Basin with approximate location of allocated oil exploration blocks

The Great South Basin off the coast of Otago and Southland at over 500,000 square kilometres (190,000 sq mi) (covering an area 1.5 times New Zealand's landmass) is one of New Zealand's largest undeveloped offshore petroleum basins with prospects for both oil and gas. In July 2007, the New Zealand Government awarded oil and gas exploration permits for four areas of the Great South Basin, situated in the volatile waters off the Southern Coast of New Zealand. The three successful permit holders are:

- a consortium led by ExxonMobil New Zealand (Exploration) Limited (United States) which includes local company Todd Exploration Limited (New Zealand);
- a consortium led by OMV New Zealand Limited (Austria) which includes PTTEP Offshore Investment Company Ltd (Thailand), Mitsui Exploration and Production Australia Pty Ltd (Japan); and
- Greymouth Petroleum Limited (New Zealand)

In 2010, Origin Energy has formed a joint venture with Anadarko Petroleum, the second-largest independent U.S. natural gas producer, to begin drilling for oil in the Canterbury Basin off the coast of Dunedin. Anadarko Petroleum believed that the 390 km^{2} Carrack/Caravel prospect has the potential to deliver more than the equivalent of 500,000,000 barrels (79,000,000 m^{3}) of oil and gas.

== See also ==
- Climate change in New Zealand
- Energy in New Zealand
- Oil and gas companies in New Zealand
