= Think Big =

Interventionist state economic strategy of the Third National Government of New Zealand

Think Big was an interventionist state economic strategy of the Third National Government of New Zealand, promoted by the Prime Minister Robert Muldoon (1975–1984) and his National government in the early 1980s. The Think Big schemes saw the government borrow heavily overseas, running up a large external deficit, and using the funds for large-scale industrial projects. Petrochemical and energy related projects figured prominently, designed to utilise New Zealand's abundant natural gas to produce ammonia, urea fertiliser, methanol and petrol.

The National Cabinet Minister Allan Highet coined the "Think Big" label in a speech to a National Party conference in 1977. Economist Brian Easton also used the term "think big" in describing economic strategies.

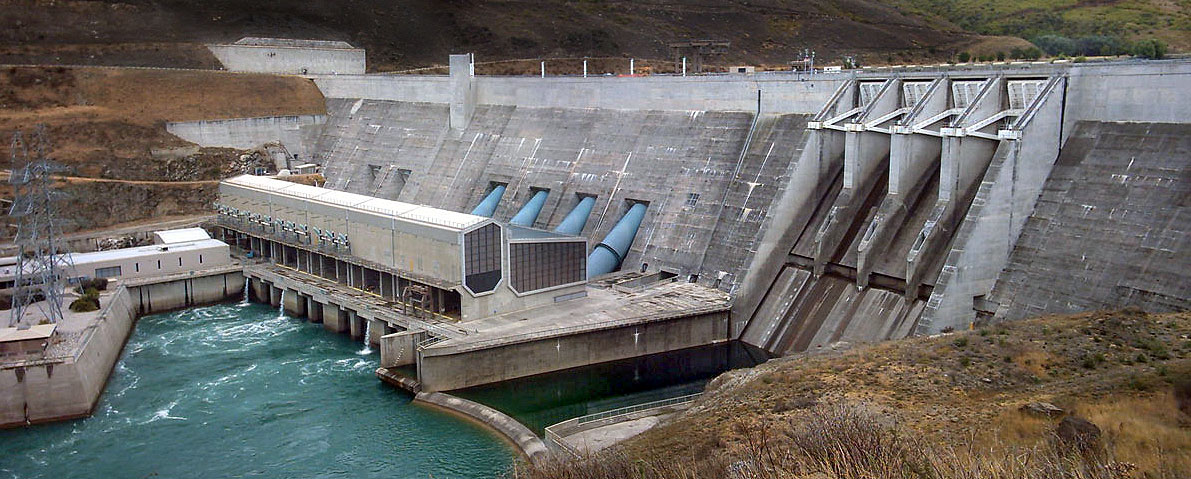
The Clyde Dam, a "Think Big" project

== History ==
In the late 1970s, New Zealand's economy was suffering from the aftermath of the 1973 energy crisis, from the loss of its biggest export market upon Britain's joining the European Economic Community, and from rampant inflation.

In 1978, New Zealand faced a further crisis in oil supply. OPEC continued to raise the price of oil. Then in 1979 the Iranian Revolution paralysed that country's oil-industry and 5.7 million barrels (910,000 m^{3}) of oil per day were withdrawn from world supply.

In 1978, Bill Birch became the Minister of Energy. He looked to the substantial reserves of natural gas under Taranaki and off its coast as an opportunity to bring life to the ailing economy.

In 1979, the oil crisis worsened. During the first half of 1979, OPEC raised oil prices from US$12 a barrel to US$19 a barrel. The New Zealand government banned weekend sales of petrol. On 30 July 1979, the government introduced carless days, where private motorists had to choose one day of the week, on which they could not drive their motor vehicle. Heavy fines were imposed for motorists who were caught driving on their nominated carless day.

The increases in oil prices substantially worsened the country's already precarious terms of trade. The cost of oil loomed as the major component of the New Zealand balance of payments deficit. Muldoon's administration intended the Think Big projects to reduce New Zealand's reliance on imports, especially oil, and thus improve the balance of payments.

== Projects ==
The core Think Big projects included the construction of the Mobil synthetic-petrol plant at Motunui, the complementary expansion of the Marsden Point Oil Refinery near Whangārei, and the building of a stand-alone plant at Waitara to produce methanol for export. Motunui converted natural gas from the off-shore Maui field to methanol, which it then converted to petrol on-site. Declining oil prices rendered this process uneconomic and saw a reduction in the production of synthetic fuel; however, the industry still remained at large due to prior investment. New Zealand would abandon the manufacturing of synthetic petrol in February 1997, allowing the plant to switch the focus to methanol..

The construction of the Clyde Dam on the Clutha River formed part of a scheme to generate electricity for the national grid. A proposed smelter at Aramoana on Otago Harbour was never built—largely owing to resistance on the grounds of the environmental damage that would have been a consequence.

=== List of projects ===
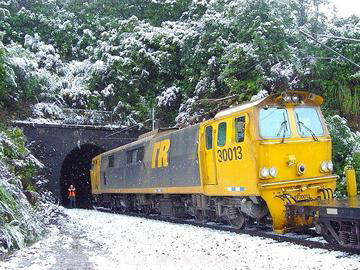
An electric EF class locomotive on the electrified section of the NIMT

- methanol plant at Waitara
- ammonia/urea plant at Kapuni
- synthetic petrol plant at Motunui
- expansion of the Marsden Point Oil Refinery
- expansion of the New Zealand Steel plant at Glenbrook
- electrification of the North Island Main Trunk Railway between Te Rapa and Palmerston North
- a third reduction line at the Tiwai Point aluminium smelter, near Bluff
- the Clyde Dam on the Clutha River.

Of these 8 projects, only one has been shut down. This is the Marsden Point Oil Refinery, which was closed down in 2022 and dismantled.

== Measuring outcome ==
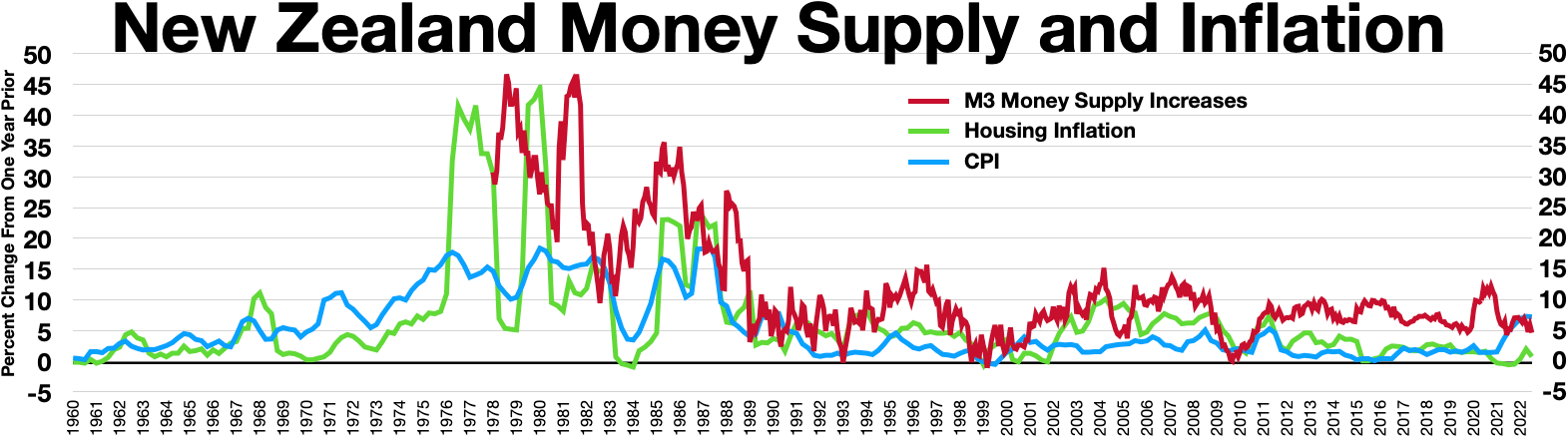
New Zealand money supply and inflation M3 money supply increases Housing inflation Consumer price index

New Zealand's economy suffered from the major investments made by the government. Investment incentives and macroeconomic ratios were heavily affected by the billions of dollars borrowed for the Think Big projects. On 27 September 1982, Muldoon introduced 'The Wage Freeze Regulations' that would freeze wages and prices on a national scale until 22 June 1983. The policy had attempted to target inflation, but in turn reduced profitability for exporters unable to adapt prices.

Approval of Think Big, at least during and soon after the time of its implementation, tended to rely on party affiliations (with National Party supporters backing the projects, while Labour Party supporters initially opposed them). Think Big projects became synonymous with further inflation and industrial trouble. Richard Prebble said to the Labour Cabinet during the Māori loan affair: "Better to talk about the $7 billion that was borrowed (by Muldoon for Think Big) than about the $600 million that wasn't."

== See also ==
- National Development Act 1979
- Politics of New Zealand
- Economy of New Zealand
