= Crown Minerals Amendment Act 2025 =

Proposed Act of Parliament in New Zealand

New Zealand Parliament
- Royal assent: 5 August 2025

Legislative history
- Introduced by: Shane Jones
- Committee responsible: Economic Development, Science and Innovation
- First reading: 24 September 2024
- Second reading: 5 November 2024
- Third reading: 31 July 2025
- Passed: 31 July 2025

Related legislation
- Crown Minerals Act 1991
- Status: Current legislation

The Crown Minerals Amendment Act 2025 is a New Zealand Act of Parliament that amends the Crown Minerals Act 1991 to reverse a 2018 ban on offshore oil and gas exploration and eases the decommissioning liability of the New Zealand Crown's minerals regime. The bill was the brainchild of New Zealand First politician and Minister for Resources Shane Jones. It passed its third reading on 31 July 2025, and received royal assent on 5 August 2025.

== Key provisions ==
The Crown Minerals Amendment Act 2025 removes the 2018 ban on oil and gas exploration beyond onshore Taranaki as part of the New Zealand Government's move to invest in the petroleum extraction sector. The Act also amends the decommissioning regime by giving the Minister of Resources discretion to assign liability to former permit holders or those who held interests in former petroleum permits.

The Act also amends the Crown Minerals Act 1991 to change its purpose from "managing" to "promoting" the prospecting, exploration and mining of Crown-owned minerals for New Zealand's benefit. It also allows the Minister of Resources discretionary powers to issue government policy statements (GPS) on minerals and petroleum, grant exploration permits, make decisions (with others) on requiring guarantees from permit holders, and to make decisions on the decommissioning of petroleum infrastructure and wells including financial security arrangements. It also introduces a new Tier 3 permit programme for small-scale, non-commercial gold mining operations.

The Act also allows new methods for allocating petroleum permits. In terms of the mining and extraction decommissioning regime, it provides greater flexibility for exemption and deferral powers, as well as the types of acceptable financial securities. The Act also extends the confidentiality period for speculative prospectors who were impacted by the 2018 ban on oil and gas exploration.

== Background ==
On 12 April 2018, the Sixth Labour Government announced it would ban future offshore oil and gas exploration in New Zealand. In addition, Energy Minister Megan Woods clarified that the thirty existing exploration permits would still continue and be unaffected by the ban. New Zealand has 27 oil fields with most being located in the Taranaki Basin. The ban on future oil and gas exploration was part of a coalition agreement between the New Zealand Labour Party and the Green Party of Aotearoa New Zealand. The decision was welcomed by Greens co-Leader James Shaw, Greenpeace and Forest & Bird but was criticised by the Mayor of New Plymouth Neil Holdom, and the opposition National and ACT New Zealand parties. The New Zealand Parliament subsequently passed the Crown Minerals (Petroleum) Amendment Act 2018, which banned the granting of new offshore oil and gas permits as part of the Labour-led government's climate strategy of transitioning away from fossil fuels.

Following the collapse of the Taramind Taranaki's Tui oil field which led the New Zealand Crown to spend NZ$443 million on decommissioning costs, Parliament passed the Crown Minerals (Decommissioning and Other Matters) Amendment Act 2021 which obligated petroleum permit holders to fully fund and carry out decommissioning operations at oil wells. While the automatic decommissioning mechanism was intended to be a safeguard, this law raised concerns among investors that companies would become liable for decommissioning costs in corporate restructure situations for former operations which they no longer controlled or monitored.

In early June 2024, Resources Minister Shane Jones announced that the National-led coalition government would introduce legislation to reverse the previous Labour Government's 2018 ban on oil and gas exploration in the second half of 2024. He also confirmed that the Government would also amend legislation to make it easier for companies to get permission for oil exploration. Jones argued that reversing the ban on oil and gas exploration would help attract investment and promote economic growth and jobs. The Green Party's co-leader Chlöe Swarbrick said that reversing the ban would worsen climate change while the Labour Party's energy spokesperson Woods criticised the Government for ignoring alternative, renewable energy sources. As a cabinet minister in the previous Labour-led coalition government, Jones and his New Zealand First colleagues had supported the previous government's ban on offshore oil and gas exploration while supporting the retention of existing permits.

== Legislative history ==
=== Introduction ===
The Crown Minerals Amendment Bill was introduced into the New Zealand Parliament by New Zealand First Member of Parliament and Resources Minister Shane Jones on 24 September 2024. That same day, it passed its first reading and was referred to the Economic Development, Science and Innovation select committee.

=== Select committee stage ===
The Economic Development, Science and Innovation select committee was led by ACT New Zealand MP Parmjeet Parmar, New Zealand National Party MPs Dan Bidois, Vanessa Weenink, Labour MPs Reuben Davidson, Willie Jackson, Helen White, NZ First MP Tanya Unkovich, and Green MP Scott Willis. In addition, Green MP Steve Abel and Labour MP Megan Woods participated in the bill as an item of business.

Public submissions for the Crown Minerals Amendment Bill were held between 23 September and 1 October 2024. The select committee heard submissions from 5,524 interested groups and individuals, including 104 oral submissions. Due to the large volume of submissions and the short consultation timeframe, the committee focused on processing submissions from key stakeholders, randomly-selected groups and individuals and excluded form submissions and short submissions that were less than two sentences. The committee identified at least 640 submissions based on six online templates. The Resources Minister Jones also delivered an oral submission on 7 October 2024. 94.5% (5,219) of submitters opposed the bill.

The select committee considered several proposed amendments including changes to the mine permits system, financial securities for the decommissioning of petroleum infrastructure and wells, post-decommissioning liability, government position statements, and Tier 3 permit provisions. Due to the split membership of the select committee, they were unable to agree on whether the Crown Minerals Amendment Bill should pass or whether to recommend amendments. However, the committee agreed to instruct the Parliamentary Counsel Office to draft a revision-tracked version of the bill with some amendments. The report was submitted to Parliament on 25 October 2024.

Both the Labour and Green parties issued "differing views" on the proposed bill. Labour opposed the bill on the grounds that it slowed down the transition towards more renewable forms of energy and posed serious climate emissions and international reputational implications for New Zealand. Labour pointed out that 96% of submissions the committee received were opposed to the bill. They contended that the bill would also adversely affect New Zealand's climate reduction targets, hurt New Zealand's international trading agreements and undermine Māori rights and interests under the Treaty of Waitangi. They also expressed concern that the Government would make taxpayers responsible for paying the costs of decommissioning petroleum infrastructure and oil wells. Similarly, the Greens argued that ending the ban on oil and gas exploration would worsen climate change, hurt New Zealand's international reputation, and harm the environment, oceans and marine life. They also contended changes to the decommissioning regime posed a financial risk to the New Zealand Crown and taxpayers.

=== Final readings ===
The Crown Minerals Amendment Bill passed its second reading on 5 November 2024. It then passed through the Committee of the Whole House on 29 July 2025. Due to a last-minute motion by Jones, the bill was sent back to the committee stage for a recommittal to include an amendment designating the responsibility for paying the costs of decommissioning and cleaning the oil wells to the Minister for Resources and the Minister of Finance instead of a model of trailing liability.

The Bill passed its third and final reading on 31 July 2025.
