= Energy Resources Aotearoa =

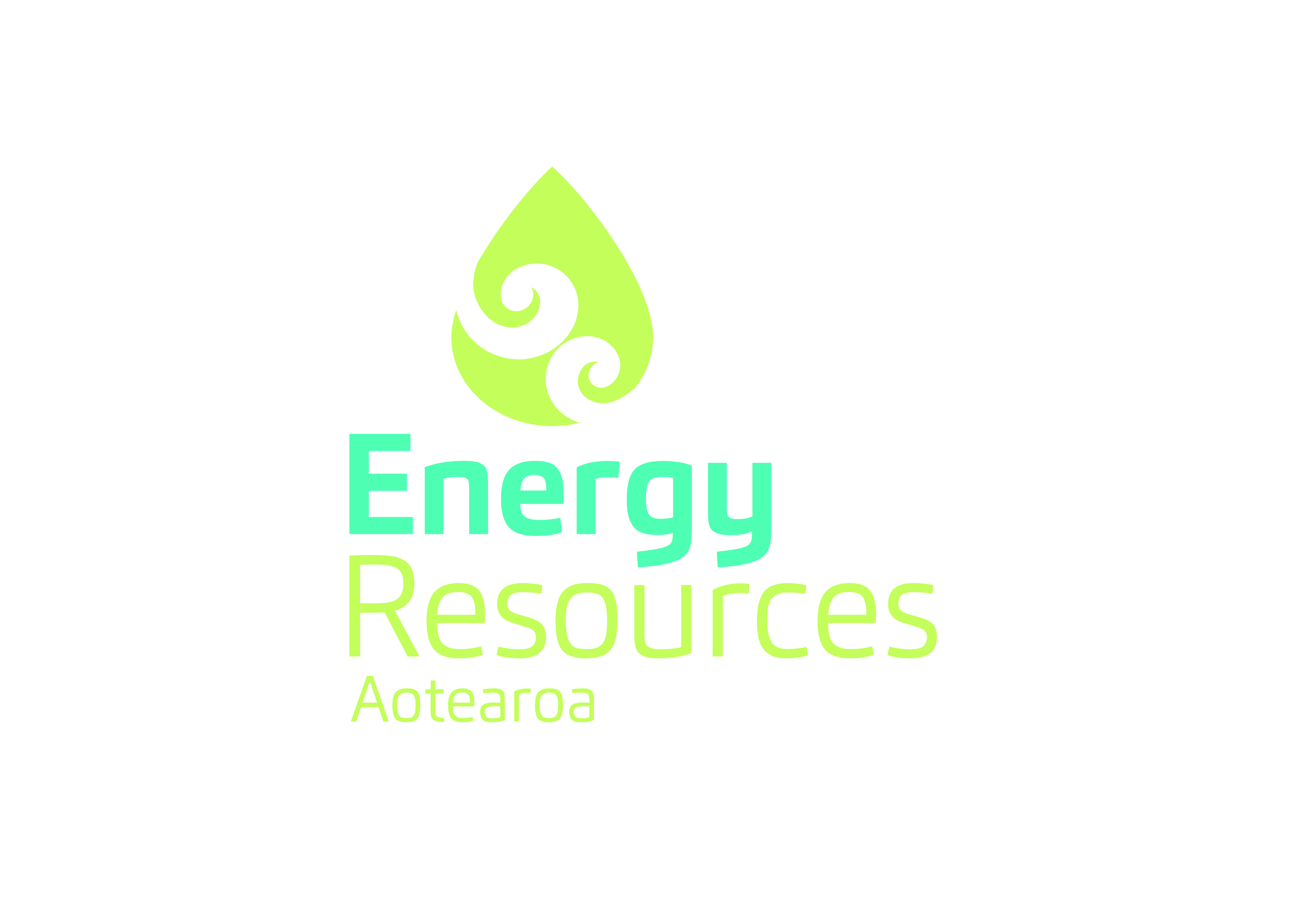
- Formation: 1972
- Headquarters: Wellington, New Zealand
- Key people: John Carnegie, chief executive
- Website: www.energyresources.org.nz

Energy Resources Aotearoa, formerly known as Petroleum Exploration and Production Association of New Zealand (PEPANZ) until March 2021, is an incorporated society based in Wellington which represents the wider energy resources sector, including the upstream oil and gas sector in New Zealand. They work with central and local government, stakeholders and the wider public. As part of this they hold events, publish educational booklets, make numerous submissions and run the social media campaign Energy Voices to promote use of natural gas.

== Members ==
Full members include:

- Beach Energy
- New Zealand Oil and Gas
- OMV New Zealand Limited
- Todd Energy

Associate members include service providers to the oil and gas industry in New Zealand (such as contractors, legal firms, engineers).

== Climate change ==
Energy Resources Aotearoa says it supports the transition to lower emissions.

As PEPANZ, the organisation was criticised for advocating increased use of fossil fuels, such as oil and natural gas.

== See also ==
- Energy in New Zealand
- Oil and gas industry in New Zealand
