= McKee power station =

Power station in Taranaki, New Zealand

McKee Power Station
- Country: New Zealand
- Location: Taranaki
- Coordinates: 39.0977°S 174.3360°E
- Status: Operational
- Owner: Nova Energy
- Operator: Nova Energy

Thermal power station
- Primary fuel: Natural gas

Power generation
- Units operational: 4
- Nameplate capacity: 102 MW

The McKee power station is a gas-fired generating plant located at the McKee production station in north Taranaki, New Zealand. The plant currently comprises two 50 MW gas turbines in open cycle mode and two 1 MW reciprocating engines in cogeneration mode. It is owned and operated by Nova Energy.

The 100 MW open cycle gas turbine power station was officially opened in March 2013. This plant comprises two GE LM6000 gas turbines and was constructed at a cost of $100 million.

== See also ==
- McKee field
- Electricity sector in New Zealand
- List of power stations in New Zealand
