= Continental Shelf Act 1964 =

Continental Shelf Act 1964 may refer to:

- Continental Shelf Act 1964 (New Zealand)
- Continental Shelf Act 1964 (United Kingdom)
