= McKee field =

Oil and gas field in Taranaki, New Zealand

Coordinates: 39°05′19″S 174°20′02″E

McKee field is an oil and gas producing field in Taranaki, New Zealand. It is located 20 km south east of New Plymouth. The field is now owned and operated by subsidiaries of Todd Energy.

The field is named for Tasman Joseph McKee, a New Zealand energy industry advocate and scientist.

== History ==
In 1961, Shell BP and Todd Oil Services Limited drilled and tested the Mangahewa 1 well, which was not successful and was abandoned.

In 1979 and 1980, McKee wells 1 and 2 were drilled, enabling development of the field. Construction of the McKee production station began in 1983, with official opening in 1985. It is located on Otaraoa Road near Tikorangi.

A major expansion of the production station was opened in May 2014. The $840 million Mangahewa Expansion Train 2 (MET2) increased capacity from 20 to 45 petajoules a year.

== Production ==
In the 25 years to 2009, the McKee field produced 47 million barrels of crude oil and 150 PJ of natural gas. Current daily production is 420 barrels of crude oil, 800 barrels of condensate and 20 TJ of natural gas.

== See also ==
- McKee power station
- Energy in New Zealand
- Oil and gas industry in New Zealand
