= Petrocorp =

Former New Zealand enterprise

- Industry: Oil and gas
- Founded: 1978
- Parent: Fletcher Challenge

Petrocorp, formally the Petroleum Corporation of New Zealand Limited, is a former New Zealand state-owned enterprise that was formed in 1978. It was sold by the Fourth Labour government in 1988 to Fletcher Challenge and became the Fletcher Energy group.

The company was created to undertake the government's petroleum exploration activities and was involved in the Maui gas field. Through an agreement formed on 1 October 1973 Petrocorp became a 50% owner, with Todd Corporation, BP and Shell of the Offshore Mining Company Limited which developed and then sold gas from the Maui field. These companies became known as the Maui Partners.

== Assets ==
The corporation wholly owned the Natural Gas Corporation, which, in turn, owned gas transmission pipelines from Kapuni to Auckland and Kapuni to Wellington, and the Kapuni Gas Treatment Plant.

== Sale ==
In 1987, Petrocorp became a publicly listed company on the New Zealand Stock Exchange, due to a 30% share sell down by the government. Petrocorp issued new shares that represented 30% of the total shares in the company, and 15% were sold by tender to Fletcher Challenge with the remainder offered via a share float. On 3 March 1988, Fletcher Challenge agreed to purchase the remaining 70% of the government's shares in the company for NZ$801 million via a "put and call" agreement. This was the same price previously offered by British Gas plc but rejected because of conditions requested by British Gas on the sale.

The final transaction involved the purchase of shares in PetroCorp by Fletcher Challenge with payment in Fletcher Challenge shares that were then sold by the government on 16 December 1993.
