= Crown Minerals Act 1991 =

Act of Parliament in New Zealand

New Zealand Parliament
- Long title: An Act to restate and reform the law relating to the management of Crown owned minerals
- Commenced: 1 October 1991
- Administered by: Ministry of Economic Development (formerly the Ministry of Commerce)

Legislative history
- Passed: 1991

Related legislation
- Crown Minerals Amendment Act 2013; Crown Minerals Amendment Act 2025
- Status: Amended

The Crown Minerals Act is an Act of Parliament passed in 1991 in New Zealand. It controls the management of Crown-owned minerals. Potential changes to Schedule 4 of the Act created controversy and opposition in 2010. The definition of minerals under the Act is very broad – it includes gravel, industrial rocks, building stone, coal and petroleum.

All gold, silver, uranium and petroleum, as well as any other minerals on Crown-owned land, are under Crown ownership as well.

== Schedule 4 Review ==
In 2009 the National-led government announced that it would review Schedule 4 of the Act, a list of conservation areas for which access for mining cannot be granted by the Minister of Conservation. The proposal was condemned by critics not only because of the potential environmental impacts, but also because of the associated effects that were feared for the tourism industry.

Major NGOs such as Federated Mountain Clubs and Forest and Bird came out in opposition to the plans.

In March 2010 the government requested public feedback on a discussion document on the removal of 7000 ha of land from Schedule 4. There was a record 37,500 submissions on the document. A protest March Against Mining was organised by Greenpeace NZ on 1 May in Auckland and it attracted an estimated 40,000 people.

On 20 July 2010 the Government announced that in response to receiving 37,552 submissions, the vast majority of which opposed mining, it will not remove any land from Schedule 4.

== Amendments ==
In April 2013 a group of well-known New Zealanders including actress Lucy Lawless, Geoffrey Palmer and Anne Salmond, as well as Greenpeace and Forest & Bird, said proposed amendments by the Crown Minerals (Permitting and Crown Land) Bill suggested by Energy and Resources Minister Simon Bridges were "a sledgehammer designed to attack peaceful protest at sea". This Bill was passed as the Crown Minerals Amendment Act 2013.

In 2018, the Sixth Labour Government passed the Crown Minerals (Petroleum) Amendment Act 2018, which banned the granting of new offshore oil and gas permits as part of the Labour-led government's climate strategy of transitioning away from fossil fuels. Following the collapse of the Taramind Taranaki's Tui oil field which led the New Zealand Crown to spend NZ$443 million on decommissioning costs, the Labour Government passed the Crown Minerals (Decommissioning and Other Matters) Amendment Act 2021 which obligated petroleum permit holders to fully fund and carry out decommissioning operations at oil wells.

In late July 2025, the Sixth National Government passed the Crown Minerals Amendment Act 2025, which reversed the previous Labour government's ban on oil and gas exploration, and reduced the corporate liability of the decommissioning regime for the minerals sector.

== See also ==
- Mining in New Zealand
