= Swanndri =

New Zealand company

- Type: Public company
- Industry: Clothing
- Founded: 23 December 1913; 112 years ago
- Founder: William Broome
- Headquarters: Christchurch, New Zealand
- Products: Outdoor Clothing
- Website: https://www.swanndri.co.nz

Swanndri is a trade name for a range of popular New Zealand outdoor clothing, and also used informally to refer to their original long heavy bush shirt.

The classic "swanny" or bush shirt is a heavy, hooded, woollen garment with a lace up section at the neck. Although a wide range of colours and patterns are available, the traditional swanny pattern is a dark tartan which could be described as a 'reverse gingham', with thick criss-crossing stripes of either blue or red over a black base. The item was widely worn by farmers, but in recent years its popularity has spread and it has become something of a fashion item.

The Swanndri company also now produces a range of more urban-focussed garments.

== History ==
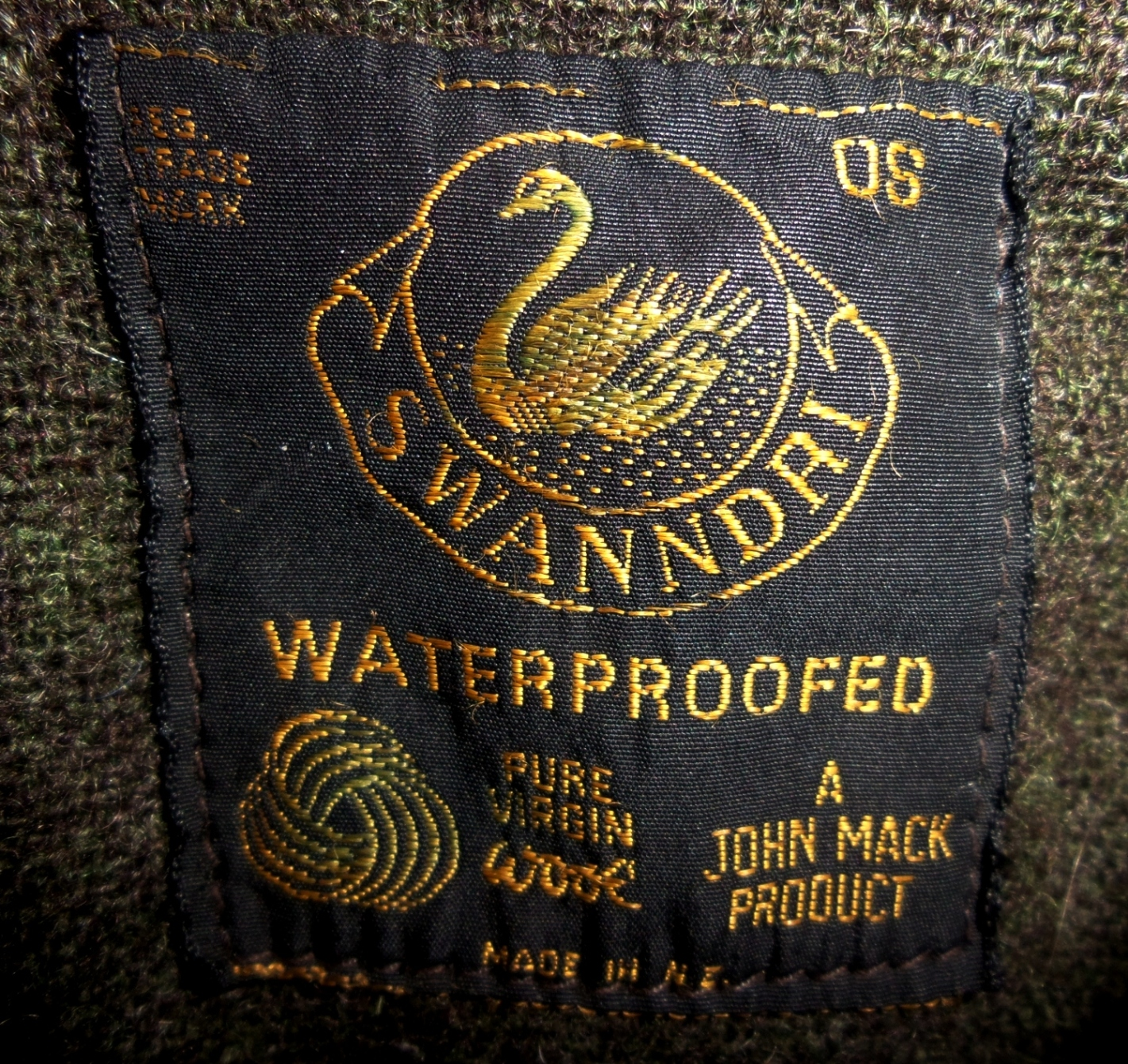
Vintage Swanndri clothing label from approximately the 1960s

The Swanndri, or "swanny" as it has been dubbed, was designed by William Broome (1873–1942). Since he registered Swanndri as a trademark on 23 December 1913, it has become an iconic New Zealand garment, and the term "swanny" has, to some extent at least, become a genericised trademark for heavy bush shirts within New Zealand.

Broome, born in Staffordshire, England, emigrated to New Zealand at age 21. A tailor by trade, he established a clothier and outfitters business, The Palatine, which was located on Devon Street, New Plymouth. Part of his business involved sewing woollen fabric from mills in Wanganui, Kaiapoi and Wellington, into the Swanndri garments. The characteristics of the "swanny" design include its heavy dark fabric, often in a tartan pattern, hood and laced neck closure. In more recent designs, a zip has replaced the lace-up neck.

The original design was short sleeved, long in the back, and would be worn on top of work clothes for warmth and shower proofing. During production, these garments were dipped into a secret mixture and then dried. It is not known if Broome had been taught the method for shower proofing the fabric he used or whether he developed the formula himself. The mixture caused the garments to shrink unevenly so were sold as one size fits all.

In 1938, Broome transferred the business to his wife, Ivy. Broome himself died four years later aged 69 years. In 1952, Ivy sold the business and trademark to John McKendrick, who operated a clothing factory at Waitara. McKendrick began purchasing fabric that was closely woven and pre-shrunk which enabled him to make different pattern sizes and garments. He sourced his cloth from South Island-based Alliance Textiles, and the business expanded with factories in Waitara and Ōpunake. Alliance Textiles bought the Swanndri trademark in 1975 and later the whole company in 1990, moving production from their factories in Timaru. In 1994, Swanndri New Zealand Ltd purchased the brand from Alliance Textiles.

According to Swanndri's corporate history, Broome's design began after he was frustrated by the persistently rainy New Zealand weather. The name Swanndri was named by Broome because the rain would literally run off the back of the garment as it does on a swan.

== Recent history ==
Swanndri has been outsourcing its production to China since 2005. While the packaging and postage reinforces the NZ connection, the labelling says "Final construction in China to Swanndri NZ standards". Thus, the manufacturer no longer qualifies for Buy NZ Made.
