= Maari oil field =

Oilfield off the coast of South Taranaki, New Zealand

Coordinates: 39°59′27.42″S 173°24′30.91″E

Maari oilfield
- Country: New Zealand
- Location: South Taranaki
- Offshore/onshore: offshore
- Operator: OMV
- Partners: OMV (69%), Horizon Oil (26%), Cue Taranaki (5%)

Field history
- Start of production: 2009

Production
- Estimated oil in place: 49 million barrels (~6.7×10^{6} t)

The Maari oilfield is an oil reservoir located 80 kilometres (50 mi) off the coast of South Taranaki, New Zealand. Maari is the second largest crude oil field in New Zealand with total reserves of 49 million barrels (7.8×10^{6} m^{3}). Production of oil began in February 2009, and the field is expected to have a productive life of 10 to 15 years. The lead partner for the field is OMV New Zealand (69%), with other parties Horizon Oil (26%) and Cue Taranaki (5%).

== See also ==
- Energy in New Zealand
- Oil and gas industry in New Zealand
