= Crown Minerals Amendment Act 2013 =

Act of Parliament in New Zealand

New Zealand Parliament
- Royal assent: 19 May 2013

Legislative history
- Bill title: Crown Minerals (Permitting and Crown Land) Bill
- Introduced by: Phil Heatley
- Introduced: 20 September 2012
- First reading: 25 September 2012
- Second reading: 21 March 2013
- Third reading: 16 May 2013
- Status: Current legislation

The Crown Minerals Amendment Act 2013 (introduced as the Crown Minerals (Permitting and Crown Land) Bill) is an Act in New Zealand. The Act amends the Crown Minerals Act 1991, the Conservation Act 1987, the Continental Shelf Act 1964, the Reserves Act 1977, and the Wildlife Act 1953 and is "aimed to promote prospecting for, exploration for, and mining of Crown owned minerals for the benefit of New Zealand". It was introduced in the New Zealand Parliament by Phil Heatley on 20 September 2012. The Act received royal assent on 19 May 2013.

== See also ==
- Mining in New Zealand
- Environment of New Zealand
