= Hāmi Te Māunu =

Hāmi Te Māunu was a rangatira (hereditary Maori leader) of Ngāti Mutunga who was born in 1823 in north Taranaki. He was also known as Hamuera Koteriki and Hamiora Te Herepounamu.

Hami's father was Te Herepounamu of Ngāti Mutunga, Ngāti Kinohaku and Ngāti Rārua. Te Herepounamu was also called Koteriki. Using aliases in different stages of life was a common practice amongst New Zealand Māori people. Hāmi's mother was Oriwia. Oriwia was of the Ngāti Mutunga, Ngāti Toa and Ngāti Raukawa iwi. Together Te Herepounamu and Oriwia had 3 children. The eldest was Makareta (who married Wiremu Tamihana Te Matawhitu), then Hāmi, and a final daughter Hēni.

Hāmi married Maea Tarata and is recorded as having four daughters, Horiana, Te Ata Hāmuera, Heni Hāmuera, and Rakera Hāmuera, and one son, Whakaheke. All of Hāmi’s biological children predeceased him, and later in life, he took under whāngai arrangement with his sister Makareta, a distant relative and girl, Ngāropi Tūhata. He also took as whāngai, his biological nephew, the son of his younger sister Hēni, Tīwai Pōmare.

The kāinga (abode) of all of Te Herepounamu’s children were shared in common throughout their lifetimes. In 1831, the two eldest children (Makareta 9 years old, and Hami 8 years old) left Taranaki with a number of Ngāti Mutunga. This correlates with the time that the Tama Te Uaua migration to Wellington occurred. They stayed there together for 4–5 years prior to their departure to Wharekauri when Te Herepounamu invaded with Ngāti Mutunga and Ngāti Tama.

Having lived on Wharekauri for almost 30 years Te Herepounamu's children returned to Urenui, in north Taranaki where they continued to reside with short intervals at Parihaka and for Hami a short sojourn to Wharekauri in 1870 for Native Land Court title investigation sittings before returning to Urenui.

Heni died first c1874 – 1876, followed later by Hāmi in 1901, and finally Makareta in 1904. All three siblings are believed to be buried on Okoki pa at Urenui.

== Land titles ==
Hāmi Te Māunu was the only male heir to the mana of Te Herepounamu. As such, when the Native Land Court began individualising titles to previously communally owned customary Maori land, Hāmi became the major individual land holder on behalf of his whānau, often to the exclusion of his sisters and their children.

Hāmi Te Māunu was an original individual land grantee in the following land blocks after title investigations were conducted by the Native Land Court from 1870 or through Crown Grants of confiscated land through the West Coast Commission of 1880.

Name of land block	Situation	Land area
Kinohaku West E	Waikawau Valley	246 acres
Kekerione 1W	Waitangi, Chatham Islands	80 acres
Waitara Block 4 Sec 23 & 24	Urenui	19 acres
Kinohaku East No.2	Pakeho, King Country	124 acres
Motuhara	Forty Fours Islands	3 acres
Te Awapatiki	Chatham Islands	
Te Matarae	Chatham Islands	
Otonga	Chatham Islands	
