= Continental Shelf Act 1964 (New Zealand) =

Act of Parliament in New Zealand

Continental Shelf Act

New Zealand Parliament
- Long title: An Act to make provision as to the exploration and exploitation of the continental shelf of New Zealand and for matters connected with that purpose
- Royal assent: 3 November 1964
- Commenced: 3 November 1964
- Status: Current legislation

The Continental Shelf Act 1964 is an Act of Parliament in New Zealand regulating the use of the continental shelf. It is administered by the Ministry of Foreign Affairs and Trade. Except for two sections the Act it is in force in the Cook Islands, a country in free association with New Zealand. It was amended by the Crown Minerals Amendment Act 2013.

== See also ==
- Coastline of New Zealand
