= Kapuni =

Natural gas liquids field in New Zealand

Coordinates: 39°28′36″S 174°10′21″E

Kapuni is an onshore natural gas-condensate field located in the Taranaki Basin, a ~100,000 km^{2} partially-inverted rift basin on the Taranaki Peninsula in the North Island, New Zealand. Discovered in 1959 and brought into production in 1970, Kapuni remained New Zealand's only producing gas-condensate field until the offshore Maui gas field began production in 1979.

== Geology ==
=== Geologic history ===
During the Lower Cretaceous (~150–100 Ma) Rangitata Orogeny, an accretionary wedge accumulated and was uplifted on the margin of Gondwana in present-day New Zealand. The resulting topography was eroded throughout the Cretaceous. After the Rangitata Orogeny, seafloor spreading commenced during the Middle Cretaceous. This resulted in the formation of the Tasman Sea as New Zealand separated from Australia. Normal faults, including the Manaia Fault, formed as the Taranaki Basin developed during seafloor spreading. Rifting continued until the Eocene (~56 Ma), when the Taranaki Basin underwent passive subsidence. Kapuni collected abundant organic material under coastal plain and fluvio-estuarine environments during much of the Eocene. A broad marine transgression occurred in the Late Oligocene to Early Miocene (~28–20 Ma), and mudstones were deposited on top of the Eocene organic-rich shales and sandstones.

Cretaceous to Paleocene rift-related normal faults were reactivated in the Late Eocene (~40–34 Ma) and experienced substantial basin inversion in the Late Miocene (~12–5 Ma). During this time, north-plunging inversion structures, including the Kapuni Anticline, developed along the Manaia Fault and other rift-structures in the Taranaki Basin's Eastern Mobile Belt. Further west, in the Taranaki Basin's Western Stable Platform, Cretaceous rift-related faults experienced little strain. Cenozoic compression in the Taranaki Basin has generally been attributed to a change in stress regime caused by the development of the Hikurangi Subduction System between the Pacific and Australian Plates off the east coast of New Zealand's North Island. Late Eocene compressional structures in the Taranaki Basin correspond with a period of elevated uplift rates along the Alpine Fault on New Zealand's South Island that has also been attributed to the nearby subduction zone. Kapuni is located on the Australian Plate, west of the plate boundary zone and above the subducting Pacific Plate.

Current geothermal gradients in the Taranaki Basin vary from 33 to 35 °C/km offshore near the Maui Field and in northern portions of the Taranaki Peninsula to 25 °C/km in Kapuni and other southeast portions of the Taranaki Peninsula.

=== Source Rocks ===
Kapuni's source rocks are a series of type III kerogen-rich coal sequences in the Eocene (~56–34 Ma) Mangahewa Formation of the Kapuni Group. These coals were deposited under coastal plain and fluo-estuarine environments and reach up to 10 m in thickness.

Stratigraphic Column of Kapuni Reservoirs and Seal.

=== Reservoirs ===
Like its source rocks, Kapuni's reservoir layers are located in the Eocene Mangahewa Formation and were deposited as part of a general transgressive sequence. The reservoirs are predominantly sandstones, shales, and coals deposited in shore, fluvial, and estuarine environments. Kapuni's reservoirs are located below a depth of 3000 m. They range in average thickness from 20 m to 130 m, average natural-gas fraction from 0.06 to 0.95, and average porosity from 12.2% to 16.8% by volume.

=== Kapuni Anticline ===
Hydrocarbons of the Kapuni Field are trapped by the Kapuni Anticline, in the hanging wall of the east-dipping Manaia Fault, a reverse fault in the Eastern Mobile Belt. The Kapuni Anticline is asymmetric, doubly-plunging, and approximately 18 km long and 8 km wide. The Manaia Fault initially developed as a normal fault bounding the Manaia Graben during Cretaceous to Early Eocene rifting associated with the opening of the Tasman Sea. Dextral transpression associated with the Hikurangi Subduction System caused fault reactivation and basin inversion during the Eocene and Miocene, resulting in the development of the Kapuni Anticline. Maximum throw on the Manaia Fault is 900 m.

=== Seal ===
Middle Oligocene (~30–25 Ma) mudstones of the Otaraoa Formation overly the Mangahewa Formation, sealing Kapuni's reservoirs. These mudstones were deposited under a continental shelf environment as part of the same broad transgressive sequence under which the Mangahewa Formation was deposited.

=== Faulting ===
Faulting is pervasive in the Kapuni Group and predominantly consists of southwest–northeast right-lateral and northwest–southeast left-lateral strike-slip faults. These faults were formed under transpressional and compressional stress regimes during the Late Eocene to Late Miocene and are indicative of an east–west direction of maximum compressive stress. In the northern portion of the Kapuni Anticline, these two dominant fault trends become nearly orthogonal to one another. This is a result of fault block rotation that produced necessary extension along the anticline's younger units during fold growth.

=== Secondary porosity ===
Kapuni's gas is CO_{2}-rich, containing approximately 40-45 mol% CO_{2}. This has facilitated significant diagenesis and the development of secondary porosity, especially in the K3E reservoir, one of the field's main producing reservoirs. Beginning approximately 5 Ma, thermal maturation of source rocks expelled CO_{2}, which dissolved into groundwater. The acidic groundwater migrated updip towards the crest of the Kapuni anticline, dissolving feldspar and carbonates along its route. Intervals of coarser clasts experienced net dissolution, while finer-grained intervals experienced precipitation of authigenic clays, carbonates, and quartz. Precipitation of quartz and carbonate cements began approximately 4 Ma at temperatures exceeding 100 °C. The carbon isotope signature of carbonate cements in the K3E reservoir suggests an intraformational origin. As a result of diagenesis, the K3E reservoir contains areas exhibiting significant secondary porosity and enhanced reservoir quality along with tight, cemented regions of poor reservoir quality.

== Production history ==
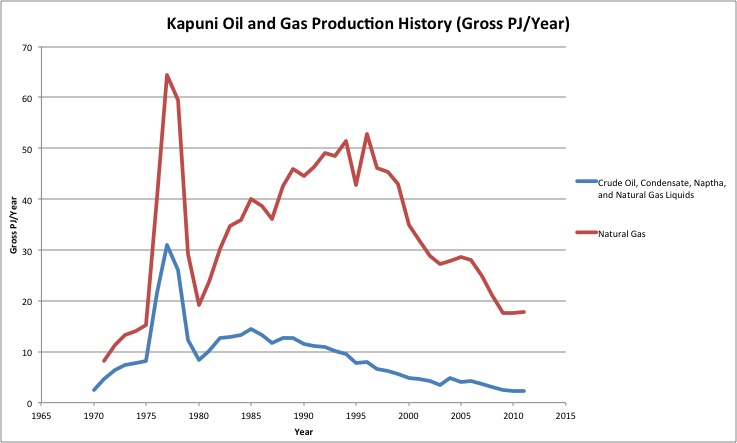
Kapuni hydrocarbon production history.

New Zealand's first natural gas field, Kapuni was discovered in 1959 by a team consisting of Royal Dutch/Shell, British Petroleum, and Todd Energy. Production of oil (mainly condensate and natural gas liquids) began in 1970, and production of natural gas began in 1971. Production peaked in 1977 at over 64 PJ/year of gas and nearly 31 PJ/year of oil. Kapuni's production declined precipitously after the more productive, offshore Maui gas field began producing in 1979. British Petroleum sold its ownership of Kapuni to Royal Dutch/Shell and Todd Energy in 1991, and Todd Energy became the field's sole owner in 2017. As of 2011 Kapuni produces nearly 18 PJ/year of natural gas and 2.25 PJ/year of oil. This accounts for 9.9% of New Zealand's natural gas production and 2.3% of New Zealand's oil production.

As production has naturally decreased over time, Kapuni's ownership has implemented hydraulic fracturing, water shutoffs, gas re-injections and other supplemental production techniques since the 1980s.

With four wells having been established by the end of field appraisal in 1963, Kapuni has grown to presently consist of twenty wells across nine well sites. Natural gas and liquids are separated, processed, and treated for CO_{2} onsite.

== See also ==
- Energy in New Zealand
- Oil and gas industry in New Zealand
- Kapuni Branch railway
