= Todd Corporation =

New Zealand electricity generator company

The Todd Corporation Limited
- Trade name: The Todd Corporation Limited
- Formerly: Heriot Fellmongery (1884–1890); C Todd & Son (1890–1892); Todd Bros & Co (1892–1919) (officially Incorporated in 1909); Todd Bros. Limited (1919–1987)
- Type: Private
- Industry: Conglomerate
- Predecessors: Todd Bros. Limited
- Founded: 1884; 142 years ago in Heriot, Otago, New Zealand
- Founder: Charles Todd Snr.
- Headquarters: Todd Building, Wellington, New Zealand
- Areas served: New Zealand; Australia; United States; European Union
- Key people: David flacks (chair); Evan Davies (CEO)
- Total equity: $3.1 billion (2019)
- Owner: Todd family (~80%)
- Divisions: Todd Energy; Nova Energy; Todd Capital
- Subsidiaries: Integria Healthcare Limited; Red Hawk Mining Limited (59.5%)
- Website: todd.co.nz

The Todd Corporation Limited is a privately held conglomerate based in New Zealand, owned and controlled by the Todd family and headquartered in Wellington, New Zealand. Todd is currently led by board chair, Nick Olson, and group chief executive officer, Evan Davies. Todd employs about 600 individuals at locations in New Zealand and Australia, including seven on the executive team. The board of directors has eight members.

== History ==
The history of Todd is understood to have begun in 1885 when Scottish immigrant Charles Todd founded and opened a fellmongery and wool scouring business (according to Todd Energy) in the small Central Otago town of Heriot. By 1929, it had evolved into a car sales and maintenance business run by his son and namesake Charles Todd after the company began importing motor vehicles.

This automotive business would define the Todd family business until well into the 1980s. Charles Todd was credited with bringing the first motor car into Otago and in 1908 acquired a Ford dealership in Dunedin then in 1928 acquired the Rootes Group franchise for Hillman, Humber and Commer and obtained an Auckland branch.

During the protectionist years of the 1930s the Todd family formed Todd Motor Industries Limited and in 1934 built an automotive assembly plant in Petone to reassemble vehicles imported as parts from Chrysler (USA) and Rootes. According to the Todd Energy website by 1964, Todd Motors was assembling and selling over 10,000 cars per year. In 1970 the company purchased the New Zealand Mitsubishi franchise. This franchise and assembly plants were sold to Mitsubishi Motors in 1987.

The Todd family also founded Europa, an oil importing and retail business that owned terminal services at four major ports and a chain of petrol stations across New Zealand. According to the Todd Energy website, this business was founded during disruptions in the petrol industry in 1929. Europa was originally named 'Associated Motorists Petrol Company Limited' (AMPC) and was formed in 1931. The company imported petrol from the Soviet Union in 1933 and was supported by the New Zealand Farmers' Union and various regional Automobile Associations. Because of price undercutting by overseas oil companies, the government introduced price regulation of petrol in 1933. According to Todd Energy, Europa was the first to offer electric petrol pumps in New Zealand, the first to use articulated road tankers for fuel distribution, and the first chain to operate service station convenience stores.

The Todd family also developed interests in the prospecting for, extraction of, and refining of petroleum products. In 1954 they acquired prospecting licenses around New Zealand and developed joint venture agreements with Shell Oil New Zealand Limited and BP New Zealand. The discovery of the Kapuni gas and condensate field in 1959 meant that the Todd family, together with Shell and BP became major players in the New Zealand petroleum production business.

Later discoveries in the Maui gas field meant the Todd family was intimately involved in supplying a majority of New Zealand's LPG and CNG natural gas for energy generation as well as fuel for the transport industry. Together with Shell, BP and the Government-owned Petrocorp began production in 1980.

In 1972 BP New Zealand took a 60 percent interest in Europa, purchasing the company's marketing and refining interests including the Europa petrol stations. The two retail brands continued to operate independently, however, in 1989 they were brought under the BP brand.

Todd continued its involvement in the exploration and production businesses.

When sold to Mitsubishi in 1987, Todd Motors was assembling a wide range of cars and light and heavy commercial vehicles. During the 1980s the Company held the number two market share position in the New Zealand automobile industry. The sale brought the Todd family's involvement in the New Zealand automotive industry to a close.

== Investments ==
Todd has interests in natural gas development and production, electricity generation and retailing, property, healthcare, minerals, and technology.

- Integria Healthcare
- PartsTrader
- Todd Energy
- Nova Energy

=== Previous investments ===
- A 35.0% shareholding in Metlifecare Limited, Todd Capital sold its entire shareholding in November 2005.
- A 14.2% shareholding in Independent Newspapers Limited (INL)
- A 25.0% shareholding in Clear Communications
- A 20.0% shareholding in AAPT Limited,
- A 21.0% shareholding in UtiliCorp NZ Inc
- An interest in Sky Network Television a pay television operator
- A 54% shareholding in King Country Energy Ltd.

== Todd Energy ==
Todd Energy
- Type: Subsidiary
- Industry: Oil production Natural gas wholesaling LPG wholesaling
- Founded: 1929; 97 years ago
- Headquarters: Wellington, New Zealand
- Key people: Mark Macfarlane (CEO)
- Number of employees: 450
- Divisions: Todd Energy Canada Ltd (TEC)
- Subsidiaries: Nova Energy
- Website: www.toddenergy.co.nz

Todd Energy is a diversified energy subsidiary based in New Zealand. Company offices are in New Plymouth, Wellington, and Calgary. Net production is approximately 25,000 barrels (4,000 cubic metres) per day of oil equivalent, and by 2015 Todd Energy expects to provide 35% of gas and 25% of oil production in New Zealand.

Todd Energy has interests in several producing fields in New Zealand, including Maui (6.25%), Kapuni (100%), McKee (100%), Mangahewa (100%), Maari (16%) and Pohokura (26%). Todd also has interests in 10 exploration permits, 5 of which are operated.

Todd has a 50% stake in Shell Todd Oil Services. Retail brands include Auckland Gas.

=== History ===
Todd Energy traces its roots back to 1929 as the first indigenous oil company in New Zealand. The first Todd-owned commercial venture in New Zealand however was a fellmongery opened at Heriot in West Otago in 1885. The fellmongery was soon accompanied by a wool scouring business set up to support the growing sheep farming industry in the lower South Island.

The Todd Group's first foray into the motor industry was by obtaining the Ford dealership in Otago in the very early part of the last century. This eventually led to them entering the petroleum industry, as a petroleum price war in 1929 cut off supplies to their Christchurch branch of a Todd motor dealership. This was the catalyst for forming the Associated Motorists Petrol Company Limited, an indigenous petroleum marketing company.

Todd Energy took a 20% shareholding in King Country Energy in 1999. It increased its holding to 35.38% in 2000. Then in 2012 it increased its holding to 54.07% and transferred it to Nova Energy. Nova sold the stake to Trustpower in 2015.

== Nova Energy ==
Nova Energy
- Type: Subsidiary
- Industry: Electricity generation, including solar Electricity retailing Natural gas retailing
- Founded: 2008; 18 years ago
- Headquarters: Wellington, New Zealand
- Area served: New Zealand
- Key people: Babu Bahirathan (CEO)
- Products: Electricity; Broadband; Mobile; Natural gas
- Website: www.novaenergy.co.nz

Nova Energy is a subsidiary that generates electricity and retails electricity, natural gas, broadband, and mobile in New Zealand. It supplies energy to both the residential and commercial sectors with customers ranging from private homes, schools, and hospitals to large industries. It is New Zealand operated, with its customer service teams based in New Zealand.

=== History ===
Nova Energy has been granted resource consents to construct a 100MW gas-fired peaking plant about 7 km south of New Plymouth and, in 2017, a 360MW mid-merit gas-fired power station near the Waipā River, at 869 Kawhia Rd, Ōtorohanga, which was put on hold in 2021. Bay of Plenty Energy was a wholly owned subsidiary that changed its name to Nova Energy, the national brand, in 2012. Crest Energy is the developer of the Kaipara Tidal Power Station.

=== Power stations ===
Their power generation assets include geothermal, gas-fired cogeneration, and solar plants.

Name	Fuel	Type	Location	Maximum capacity (MW)	Annual generation (GWh average)	Commissioned	Notes
Edgecumbe	Natural gas	Cogeneration		10			
Kapuni	Natural gas	Cogeneration	South Taranaki	22			50% interest
Kuratau	Hydroelectric		Waikato	6	30	1962	35% interest
McKee	Natural gas	Open cycle	Taranaki	102		2013	
Mokauiti	Hydroelectric		Waikato	1.925	7	1963	35% interest
Piriaka	Hydroelectric		Waikato	1.8	7	1924 (expanded 1971)	35% interest
Whareroa	Natural gas	Cogeneration	Hāwera	70	400	1996	50% interest
Wairere	Hydroelectric		Waikato		18	1925 (extended 1938 and 1981)	35% interest
