= Great South Basin =

Area of mainly sea to the south of the South Island of New Zealand

Coordinates: 47.1°S 169.7°E

Approximate location of the Great South Basin with approximate location of allocated Oil Exploration Blocks

The Great South Basin is an area of mainly sea to the south of the South Island of New Zealand.

Starting in the 1960s, the area was explored and drilled for oil deposits by various, mostly international minerals companies — including Hunt Oil — but by 1984 all of these companies had left empty-handed.

With advances in seismic surveying and drilling technology, hopes have been raised once again for a potential oil strike. Since 2006, new tenders for drilling rights have been issued.

In 2010, ExxonMobil and Todd Energy relinquished their exploration rights, citing technical difficulties and the harshness of the environment. Royal Dutch Shell subsequently purchased a stake in a joint venture headed by OMV New Zealand, with drilling announced at the start of 2014. In 2020, OMV plugged and abandoned the well after failing to find any oil. Anadarko Petroleum made a test drilling in the area in early 2014, without success. Schlumberger subsequently made a drilling attempt in the same areas later in the year.
