= Tui oil field =

Oilfield off the coast west of Taranaki, New Zealand

Coordinates: 39°26′35″S 173°14′10″E

- Country: New Zealand
- Location: Taranaki
- Offshore/onshore: offshore
- Operator: Tamarind Taranaki

Field history
- Start of production: 2007

Production
- Estimated oil in place: 41 million barrels (~5.6×10^{6} t)

The Tui oil field is an oil reservoir located 50 kilometres (31 mi) off the west coast of Taranaki, New Zealand. Tui is the sixth largest crude oil field in New Zealand with total reserves of 41 million barrels (6.5×10^{6} m^{3}). Remaining reserves as at January 2018 were 1 million barrels (160×10^{3} m^{3}). Oil is produced from the Tui, Amokura and Pateke wellheads on the seabed in approximately 120m of water. These wells are connected to the Umuroa, a floating production storage and offloading vessel.

The reservoir was discovered in 2003 by a joint venture between Australian Worldwide Exploration and New Zealand Overseas Petroleum. The nearby Amokura and Pateke oil reserves were discovered in 2004. In 2016, Tamarind purchased AWE's 57.5% interests in the field.

In early 2019, permits were granted for drilling of side track wells to extend the production life of the field. The drilling program was suspended in September 2019 after the first well was dry. Following the suspension of the drilling program, Tamarind warned staff on the Umuroa that its contract would not be renewed after December 31.

On 11 November 2019 field operator Tamarind Taranaki announced that it "may be insolvent" and put the company into administration.

On 27 November Tamarind was served with an abatement notice by the Environmental Protection Authority following a small oil spill at the Tui site. In 2020 the High Court ordered the Umuroa FPSO to stay connected to the oilfield and was cited by Greenpeace as a reason to urgently update the regulatory regime for oil and gas.

== See also ==
- Energy in New Zealand
- Oil and gas industry in New Zealand
