= Kupe field =

Natural gas field in the Tasman Sea

Coordinates: 39°51′3.35″S 174°7′11.79″E

The Kupe natural gas field is located in the Tasman Sea, 30 km off the coast of the town of Manaia in Taranaki, New Zealand. The field was discovered in 1986 and is located in 35 metres of water. The production facility comprises an unmanned offshore platform, a 30 km single three phase pipeline to shore and an onshore production station.

Total recoverable reserves are 437 PJ of gas and LPG and 18 million barrels (2.9 million cubic metres) of oil and condensate.

== Development project ==
Project development was led by Technip and the total project cost NZ$1.3b. The first export gas was produced in December 2009. The project was officially opened by Prime Minister John Key on 18 March 2010.

== Production facility ==
The facility is owned by a joint venture comprising;

- Beach Energy (South Australia) (50%),
- Genesis Energy (46%),
- New Zealand Oil and Gas (4%).

At its peak, the gas produced from the Kupe field is expected to meet 10 to 15 per cent of New Zealand's annual gas demand and 50 per cent of New Zealand's LPG demand.

The facility is maintained and operated by Origin.

== See also ==
- Energy in New Zealand
- Oil and gas industry in New Zealand
