= Motunui =

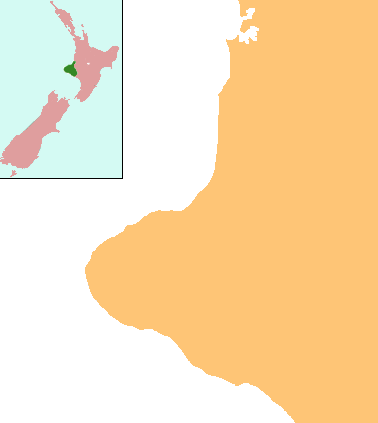
- Coordinates: 38°59′43″S 174°17′44″E
- Country: New Zealand
- Region: Taranaki
- District: New Plymouth District

Motunui (large island in Māori, from Motu Nui) is a settlement in northern Taranaki, in the North Island of New Zealand. It is located on State Highway 3 close to the shore of the North Taranaki Bight, six kilometres east of Waitara.

== Industry ==
Motunui is the location of the Motunui methanol plant, which was the largest in the world at the time of construction. It was opened in 1986 to convert natural gas to methanol, then the methanol to synthetic petrol using a process developed by Mobil. The plant was one of the Think Big projects of the Third National Government. The process became uneconomic in the late 1990s as a result of falling oil prices, so the synthetic petrol part of the plant was decommissioned, with petrol production ceasing in April 1999, and the plant instead produced methanol for export. Production of methanol ceased in 2004 as the approaching depletion of the Maui gas field raised gas prices. Methanol train No. 2 was recommissioned in 2008, followed by train No. 1 in 2012. Currently owned and operated by Methanex, the plant's two trains have a total annual production capacity of 2.4 million tonnes of methanol.

In 2005, an unmanned production station for the new offshore Pohokura oil/gas field was constructed immediately west of the methanol plant. This began commercial production in September 2006.

== August 2004 tornado ==
On the morning of 15 August 2004, a rare and deadly F3 tornado struck Motunui. The tornado killed two people and injured two others when a farmhouse on Epiha Road was completely demolished. A glass house was damaged, and livestock was killed. The tornado was the strongest ever recorded in New Zealand.
