= Pohokura field =

Oil and gas field offshore of north Taranaki in New Zealand

Coordinates: 38°58′32″S 174°16′37″E

New Zealand gas production by field 2010

The Pohokura field is an oil and gas field located 4 km offshore of north Taranaki in New Zealand, in approximately 30 m of water. The field was discovered in 2000 by Fletcher Challenge and has ultimate recoverable reserves (1P) of 1,227 billion cubic feet (34.7 billion cubic metres) or 1435 PJ of gas and 61 million barrels (9.7 million cubic metres) of oil and condensate.

The field has 6 offshore and 3 onshore wells, with the production station located on shore, adjacent to the Motunui methanol plant. The production station is unmanned, and is operated from a control room in New Plymouth. The first commercial production was in September 2006.

In 2009, Pohokura was the largest gas-producing field in New Zealand, producing 42% of total production.

Pohokura is owned by OMV (74%) and Todd Energy (26%), and is operated by OMV.

== See also ==
- Energy in New Zealand
- Oil and gas industry in New Zealand
