= Maui gas field =

Hydrocarbon field in New Zealand

Coordinates: 39.55°S 173.43°E

Maui gas field production

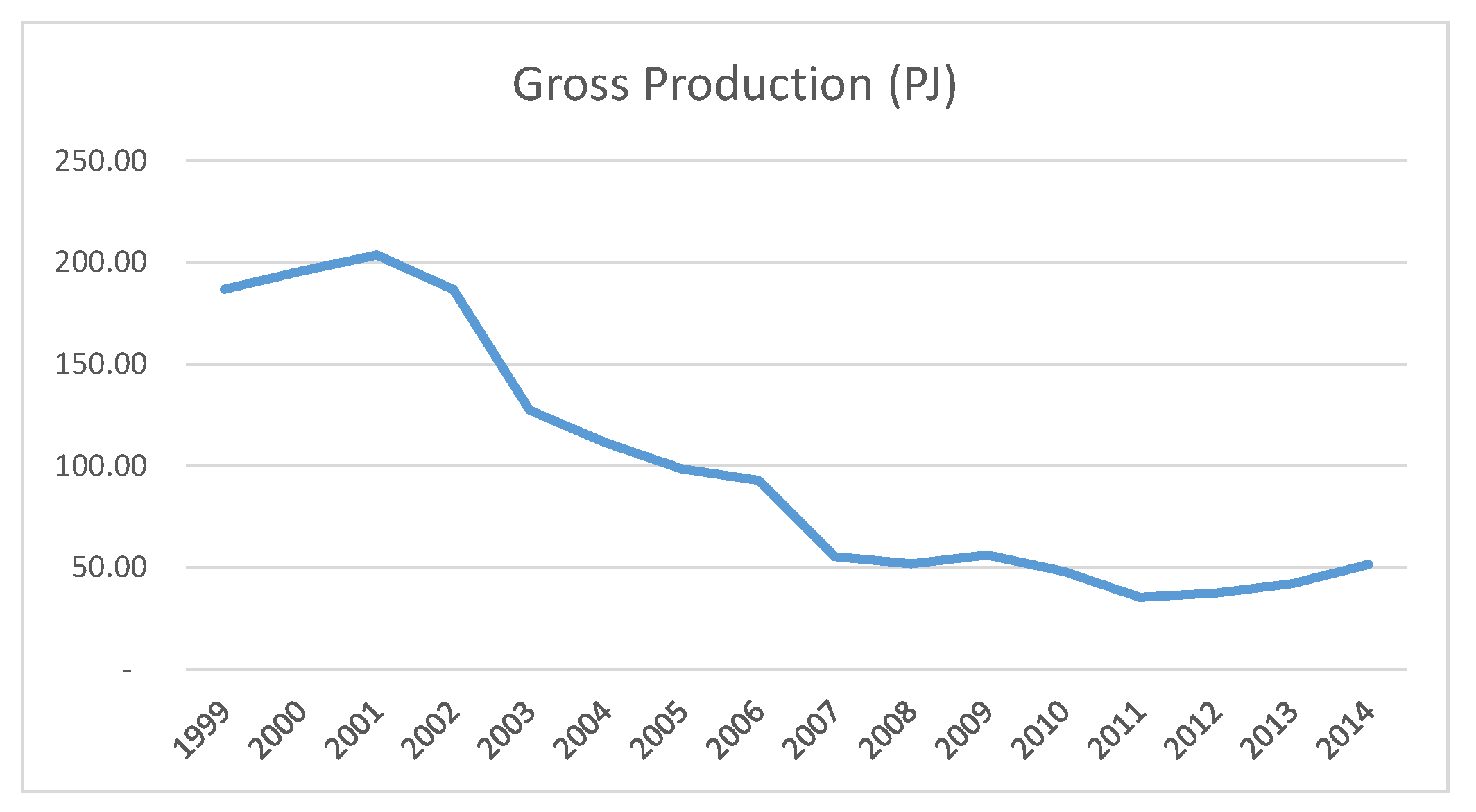
Maui gross gas production, 1999-2014

The Maui natural gas field is an offshore gas, natural gas condensate and oil field in New Zealand. It produces hydrocarbons that are burned for electricity generation at the Huntly Power Station and other plants, or are distributed for use by the country's households and businesses. It is located in the Tasman Sea, 35 km off the coast of Taranaki and to the southwest of New Plymouth. It covers an area of 157 square kilometres and is located in 110 metres of water.

== Discovery and ownership ==
The gas field was discovered in 1969 by a joint venture of Royal Dutch/Shell, British Petroleum and Todd Petroleum. It was considered a "giant" field at the time of discovery. Government investment led to a government organisation later called Petrocorp taking a 50% interest. This was later bought out by Fletcher Challenge Energy. By the end of the Maui gas contract in 2009, the Maui Mining Companies were made up of Shell (83.75%), OMV New Zealand (10%), and Todd Energy (6.25%). OMV New Zealand owns and operates the Maui gas field having acquired the 83.75% share from Shell Exploration NZ and the 6.25% share from Todd Energy since the end of 2018.

== Operations and reserves ==
Two platforms operate in the field: full production from Maui A began in 1979; Maui B was installed 13 years later. Much of the gas from Maui was used to supply the Motunui synthetic petrol plant from 1986 until it ceased operation in 2004. An onshore naphtha refining plant was installed in 1999. The floating production storage and offloading vessel Whakaaropai was installed as part of the final development phases in 1996, for the production of oil from Maui B. It was sold in 2005 when the recoverable oil reserves had been exhausted.

Gas is piped to power stations for electricity generation at Stratford and Huntly. Electricity production from the gas grew steadily from the 1970s, with it providing 30% of New Zealand's electricity in 2002. Production declined in the 2000s as the gas was depleted, providing just 16% of the country's electricity in 2005. The gas is also distributed through high-pressure pipelines for industrial and domestic use around the North Island. This used 30% of the gas produced in 2005.

In 2005, the Maui fields oil reserves were estimated to be 92% depleted, and the Maui field gas reserves were estimated to be 91% depleted.

In 2014, the New Zealand government revised its published estimates of natural gas reserves. "The biggest news of the recalculation involves one of the oldest gas producers. When the offshore Maui field was discovered in 1969 and developed 10 years later, it was forecast it would be exhausted in 30 years. But now its remaining proved reserves have been doubled to 133 PJ and its 2P reserves more than doubled to 466 PJ".

As at 2025, the New Zealand government's official published estimate of the 1P reserves for the Maui field was 20.59 PJ. Its 2P reserves were estimated at 39.86 PJ. Gross production over the period 2015-2025 was 338.77 PJ, with yearly production varying between 40.08 PJ (in 2024) and 18.04 PJ (in 2025).

== See also ==
- Energy in New Zealand
- Oil and gas industry in New Zealand
