= Taranaki =

Region of New Zealand

Coordinates: 39°18′S 174°8′E

- Region
- Logo

- Taranaki within New Zealand
- Country: New Zealand
- Island: North Island
- Seat: Stratford
- Territorial authorities: List: New Plymouth District; South Taranaki District; Stratford District (part)

Government
  - Body: Taranaki Regional Council
  - Chair: Craig Williamson
  - Deputy chair: Bonita Bigham

Area
  - Region: 7,257 km^{2} (2,802 sq mi)
  - Land: 7,254.51 km^{2} (2,800.98 sq mi)

Population (June 2025)
  - Region: 130,300
  - Density: 17.96/km^{2} (46.52/sq mi)

GDP
  - Total: NZ$9.599 billion (2021) (9th)
  - Per capita: NZ$75,643 (2021)
- Time zone: UTC+12 (NZST)
  - Summer (DST): UTC+13 (NZDT)
- ISO 3166 code: NZ-TKI
- HDI (2023): 0.940 very high · 4th
- Website: www.trc.govt.nz

Taranaki is a region in the west of New Zealand's North Island. It is named after its main geographical feature, the stratovolcano Mount Taranaki.

The main centre is the city of New Plymouth. The New Plymouth District is one of three districts in the region and is home to more than 65 per cent of the population of Taranaki. The Stratford District includes the main centres of Stratford, Midhirst, Toko and Whangamōmona. The South Taranaki District includes Hāwera, Manaia, Eltham, Pātea, and Ōpunake.

Since 2005, Taranaki has used the promotional brand "Like no other".

== Geography ==
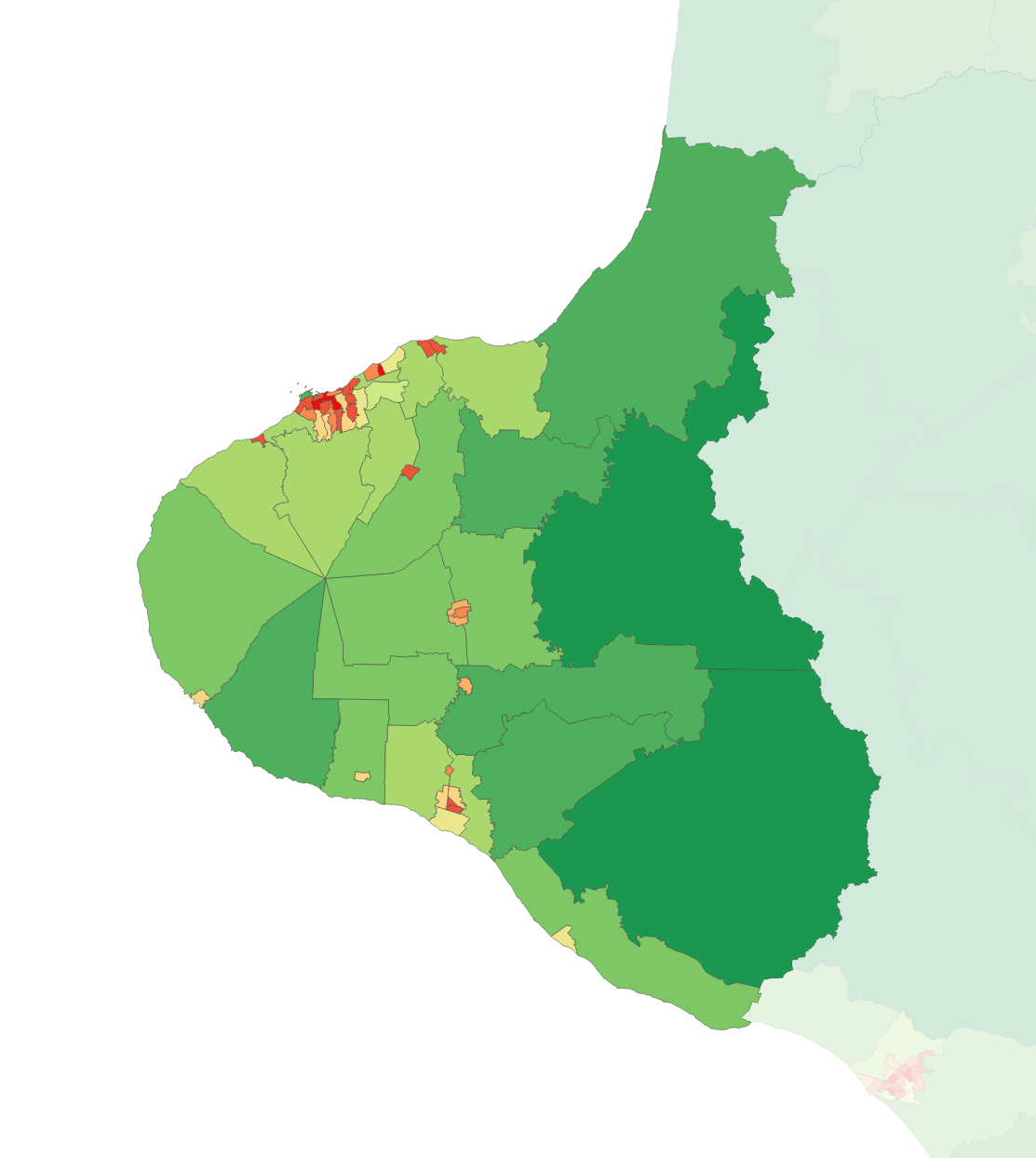
A map showing population density in the Taranaki Region at the 2023 census

Taranaki is on the west coast of the North Island, surrounding the volcanic peak of Mount Taranaki. The region covers an area of 7258 km^{2}. Its large bays north-west and south-west of Cape Egmont are North Taranaki Bight and South Taranaki Bight.

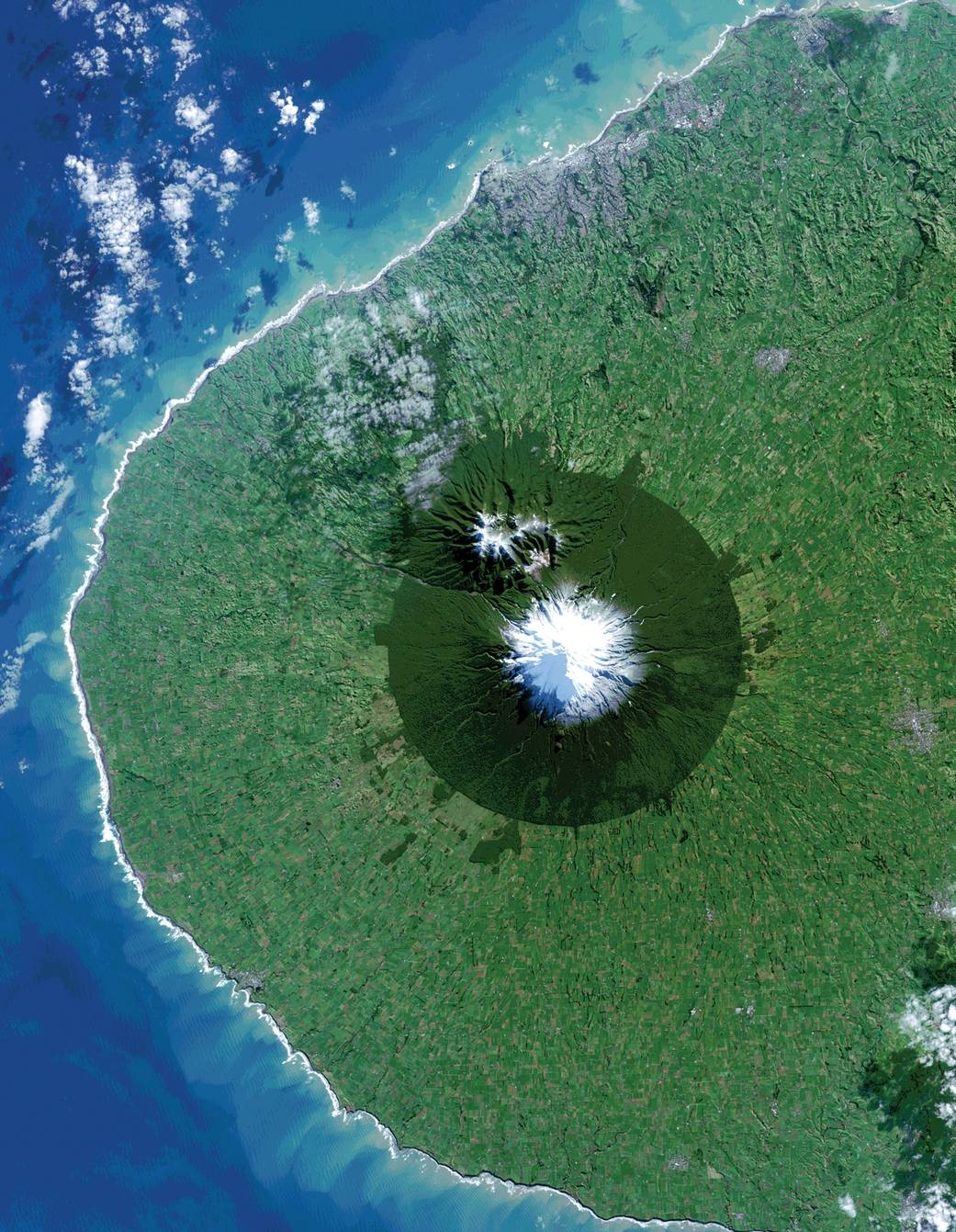
Picture of Taranaki acquired from the Landsat 8 satellite, showing the near-circular Egmont National Park surrounding Mount Taranaki. New Plymouth is the grey area on the northern coastline.

Mount Taranaki is the second highest mountain in the North Island, and the dominant geographical feature of the region. A Māori legend says that Mount Taranaki previously lived with the Tongariro, Ngāuruhoe and Ruapehu mountains of the central North Island but fled to its current location after a battle with Tongariro. A near-perfect cone, it last erupted in the mid-18th century. The mountain and its immediate surrounds form Te Papa-Kura-o-Taranaki (formerly known as Egmont National Park). Historically, the area consisted of a narrow coastal plain covered by bracken, tutu, rewarewa and karaka trees, with anywhere not close to the coast covered in dense forest.

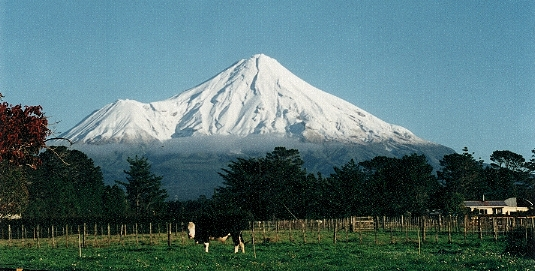
View of Mount Taranaki from Stratford, facing west. Fanthams Peak is to the left of the main peak. The cow in the foreground is emblematic of Taranaki as a major dairying region.

The region is exceptionally fertile thanks to generous rainfall and rich volcanic soil. Dairy farming predominates, with Fonterra's Whareroa milk factory just outside of Hāwera producing the largest volume of dairy ingredients from a single factory anywhere in the world. There are also both on and off shore oil and gas deposits in the region. The Maui gas field off the south-west coast has provided most of New Zealand's gas supply and once supported two methanol plants, (one formerly a synthetic-petrol plant called the Gas-To-Gasoline plant) at Motunui. Fuel and fertiliser is also produced at a well complex at Kapuni and a number of smaller land-based oilfields. With the Maui field nearing depletion, new offshore resources have been developed: the Kupe field, 30 km south of Hāwera and the Pohokura gas field, 4.5 km north of Waitara.

The way the land mass projects into the Tasman Sea with northerly, westerly and southerly exposures, results in many surfing and windsurfing locations.

== Demography ==
Taranaki covers 7,254.50 km^{2} (2,800.98 sq mi) and has a population of 130,300 as of Statistics New Zealand's June 2025, 2.4 percent of New Zealand's population. It has a population density of 18 people per km^{2}. It is the tenth most populous region of New Zealand.

Historical population
Year	Pop.	±% p.a.
1991	107,124	—
1996	106,590	−0.10%
2001	102,858	−0.71%
2006	104,127	+0.25%
2013	109,608	+0.74%
2018	117,561	+1.41%
2023	126,015	+1.40%

Taranaki Region had a population of 126,015 in the 2023 New Zealand census, an increase of 8,454 people (7.2%) since the 2018 census, and an increase of 16,407 people (15.0%) since the 2013 census. There were 62,184 males, 63,405 females and 429 people of other genders in 48,606 dwellings. 2.6% of people identified as LGBTIQ+. The median age was 40.4 years (compared with 38.1 years nationally). There were 25,428 people (20.2%) aged under 15 years, 20,625 (16.4%) aged 15 to 29, 55,932 (44.4%) aged 30 to 64, and 24,033 (19.1%) aged 65 or older.

People could identify as more than one ethnicity. The results were 83.6% European (Pākehā); 21.8% Māori; 2.6% Pasifika; 5.7% Asian; 0.8% Middle Eastern, Latin American and African New Zealanders (MELAA); and 2.7% other, which includes people giving their ethnicity as "New Zealander". English was spoken by 97.4%, Māori language by 4.5%, Samoan by 0.4% and other languages by 6.7%. No language could be spoken by 2.0% (e.g. too young to talk). New Zealand Sign Language was known by 0.5%. The percentage of people born overseas was 14.9, compared with 28.8% nationally.

Largest groups of overseas-born residents
Nationality	Population (2018)
England	4,179
Australia	1,965
South Africa	1,311
India	972
Philippines	918
Scotland	549
Fiji	498
China	480
United States	480
Netherlands	420

The region has had a strong Māori presence for centuries. The local iwi (tribes) include Ngāti Mutunga, Ngāti Maru, Ngāti Ruanui, Taranaki, Te Āti Awa, Ngā Rauru, Ngāruahinerangi and Ngāti Tama.

Religious affiliations were 30.9% Christian, 0.9% Hindu, 0.5% Islam, 0.9% Māori religious beliefs, 0.4% Buddhist, 0.5% New Age, 0.1% Jewish, and 1.1% other religions. People who answered that they had no religion were 56.3%, and 8.6% of people did not answer the census question.

Of those at least 15 years old, 12,777 (12.7%) people had a bachelor's or higher degree, 56,931 (56.6%) had a post-high school certificate or diploma, and 26,370 (26.2%) people exclusively held high school qualifications. The median income was $38,400, compared with $41,500 nationally. 9,930 people (9.9%) earned over $100,000 compared to 12.1% nationally. The employment status of those at least 15 was that 48,906 (48.6%) people were employed full-time, 14,724 (14.6%) were part-time, and 2,634 (2.6%) were unemployed.

=== Urban areas ===
Just under half the residents live in New Plymouth, with Hāwera being the next most populous town in the region.

Urban area	Population (June 2025)	% of region
New Plymouth	60,200	46.2%
Hāwera	10,700	8.2%
Waitara	7,720	5.9%
Stratford	6,430	4.9%
Inglewood	3,970	3.0%
Eltham	2,120	1.6%
Ōakura	1,780	1.4%
Ōpunake	1,470	1.1%
Pātea	1,290	1.0%
Normanby	1,080	0.8%

== History ==
The area became home to a number of Māori tribes from the 13th century. From about 1823 the Māori began having contact with European whalers as well as traders who arrived by schooner to buy flax. Around the 1820s and 1830s, whalers targeted Southern right whales in the South Taranaki Bight. In March 1828 Richard "Dicky" Barrett (1807–47) set up a trading post at Ngamotu (present-day New Plymouth). Barrett and his companions, who were armed with muskets and cannon, were welcomed by the Āti Awa tribe for assisting in their continuing wars with Waikato Māori. Following a bloody encounter at Ngamotu in 1832, most of the 2000 Āti Awa living near Ngamotu, as well as Barrett, migrated south to the Kāpiti region and Marlborough.

In late 1839 Barrett returned to Taranaki to act as a purchasing agent for the New Zealand Company, which had begun on-selling the land to prospective settlers in England with the expectation of securing its title. Barrett claimed to have negotiated the purchase of an area extending from Mokau to Cape Egmont, and inland to the upper reaches of the Whanganui River including Mt Taranaki. A later deed of sale included New Plymouth and all the coastal lands of North Taranaki, including Waitara.

Organised European settlement at New Plymouth gathered pace with the arrival of the William Bryan in March 1841. European expansion beyond New Plymouth, however, was prevented by Māori opposition to selling their land, a sentiment that deepened as links strengthened with the King Movement. Tension over land ownership mounted, leading to the outbreak of war at Waitara on 16 March 1860. Although the pressure for the sale of the Waitara block resulted from the colonists' hunger for land in Taranaki, the greater issue fuelling the conflict was the Government's desire to impose British administration, law and civilisation on the Māori.

The war was fought by more than 3,500 imperial troops as well as volunteer soldiers and militia against Māori forces that fluctuated from a few hundred and to 1,500. Total losses among the imperial, volunteer, and militia troops are estimated to have been 238, while Māori casualties totalled about 200.

An uneasy truce was negotiated a year later, only to be broken in April 1863 as tensions over land occupation boiled over again. A total of 5,000 troops fought in the Second Taranaki War against about 1,500 men, women and children. The style of warfare differed markedly from that of the 1860–61 conflict as the army systematically took possession of Māori land by driving off the inhabitants, adopting a "scorched earth" strategy of laying waste to the villages and cultivations of Māori, whether warlike or otherwise. As the troops advanced, the Government built an expanding line of redoubts, behind which settlers built homes and developed farms. The effect was a creeping confiscation of almost a million acres (4,000 km^{2}) of land.

The present main highway on the inland side of Mount Taranaki follows the path taken by the colonial forces under Major General Trevor Chute as they marched, with great difficulty, from Pātea to New Plymouth in 1866.

Armed Māori resistance continued in South Taranaki until early 1869, led by the warrior Tītokowaru, who reclaimed land almost as far south as Wanganui. A decade later, spiritual leader Te Whiti o Rongomai, based at Parihaka, launched a campaign of passive resistance against government land confiscation, which culminated in a raid by colonial troops on 5 November 1881.

The confiscations, subsequently acknowledged by the New Zealand Government as unjust and illegal, began in 1865 and soon included the entire Taranaki district. Towns including Normanby, Hāwera and Carlyle (Pātea) were established on land confiscated as military settlements. The release of a Waitangi Tribunal report on the situation in 1996 led to some debate on the matter. In a speech to a group of psychologists, Associate Minister of Māori Affairs Tariana Turia compared the suppression of Taranaki Māori to the Holocaust, provoking a vigorous reaction around New Zealand, with Prime Minister Helen Clark among those voicing criticism.

== Economy ==
The subnational gross domestic product (GDP) of Taranaki was estimated at NZ$9.51 billion in the year to March 2020, 2.94% of New Zealand's national GDP. The regional GDP per capita was estimated at $76,715 in the same period, the highest in New Zealand.

Taranaki’s economy is centred around dairy farming, hydrocarbon exploration, and manufacturing (including agricultural and energy based manufacturing) with these industries making up approximately 40 percent of the region’s GDP in 2019. Taranaki has had the highest GDP per capita from 2007 onward except in 2017 when Wellington was higher.

In the 2019–20 season, there were 468,000 milking cows in Taranaki, 9.5% of the country's total herd. The cows produced 185,320 tonnes of milk solids, worth $1,334 million at the national average farmgate price ($7.20 per kg). The Dairy Farming industry is the largest employer in Taranaki, comprising 5 per cent of all employees. The region is home to the world’s largest milk production facility by annual volume, Fonterra’s Whareroa Plant near Hawera, which produces milk powder, butter, casein whey and cheese. The region also boasts the largest secondary cheese operation in Asia-Pacific as well as a high-tech lactose plant producing pharmaceutical lactose for the global medical industry and a speciality artisan cheese facility.

Natural gas from Taranaki’s fields accounts for around 20% of New Zealand’s primary energy supply. It provides heat, energy and hot water supply for over 245,000 New Zealand households as well as more than 10,000 commercial users such as restaurants, hotels, greenhouses and hospitals. The single biggest user of natural gas is Methanex, also based in Taranaki, who use it as a feedstock to produce methanol for export. Taranaki's natural gas is also used to make urea for use on farms. The head offices of many energy companies are based in the region along with specialist service and supply companies, including freight, logistics, fabrication, technical, professional services and consultancies as well as environmental and health and safety expertise. The region is renowned for its world class engineering design and project management skills, which tackles on and off shore fabrication and construction.

== Governance ==
=== Provincial government ===
From 1853 the Taranaki region was governed as the Taranaki Province (initially known as the New Plymouth Province) until the abolition of New Zealand provinces in 1876. The leading office was that of the superintendent.

The following is a list of superintendents of the Province of Taranaki during this time:

Superintendent	Term
Charles Brown	1853–1857
George Cutfield	1857–1861
Charles Brown	1861–1865
Henry Richmond	1865–1869
Frederic Carrington	1869–1876

=== Taranaki Regional Council ===
The Taranaki Regional Council was formed as part of major nationwide local government reforms in November 1989, for the purpose of integrated catchment management. The regional council was the successor to the Taranaki Catchment Board, the Taranaki United Council, the Taranaki Harbours Board, and 16 small special-purpose local bodies that were abolished under the Local Government Amendment Act (No 3) 1988. The council's headquarters were established in the central location of Stratford to "provide a good compromise in respect of overcoming traditional south vs north Taranaki community of interest conflicts" (Taranaki Regional Council, 2001 p. 6).

Chairs

- Ross Allen (1989–2001)
- David Walter (2001–2007)
- David MacLeod (2007–2022)
- Charlotte Littlewood (2022–2025)
- Craig Williamson (2025–present)

== Public safety ==
Taranaki has 20 fire stations scattered throughout the region. It includes one career (full time) brigade based at New Plymouth Central Fire Station and is staffed by two crews (8 firefighters) 24 hours a day, 7 days a week and responds, not only to the city, but to surrounding volunteer brigades in satellite towns if needed. New Plymouth has four fire appliances, including an aerial appliance, two standard pumping appliances, pump rescue truck and three specialist vehicles. There are 17 volunteer and two rural brigades in the region.

Taranaki Base Hospital in New Plymouth is the region's largest hospital. It has a 24-hour emergency department, wards for older people's health, rehabilitation, children and young people/pediatrics, general surgery and urology, orthopedics and surgical specialties, general medicine and maternity and provides community services. It's currently undergoing a multi-million dollar development to expand its services. Hawera Hospital, one hour south, is a smaller hospital but offers 24-hour emergency department, inpatient beds, maternity services, outpatients and community services. There are health centres in Waitara, Opunake, Pātea, Mokau, Stratford and Urenui.

St John Ambulance supplies all ambulance services to Taranaki, with their main station based Waiwhakaiho on the outskirts of New Plymouth. Throughout the region, they have six emergency ambulances, two rapid response vehicles (one crewed by a critical care paramedic) and two operational managers during the day. At night, four ambulances are on duty and one rapid response vehicle. Volunteer-crewed first response units are based in Opunake and Urenui.

There are 13 police stations in the region, including three in New Plymouth and others are based in the main towns.

The Taranaki Rescue Helicopter Trust provides search, rescue and patient transfer missions when required. The MBB/Kawasaki BK 117 is based at its hangar at Taranaki Base Hospital. It serves as a critical service for missions relating to the region's mountain and steep inland hill country and marine areas.

== Sports teams ==
Notable sports teams from Taranaki include:

- Yarrows Taranaki Bulls – National Provincial Championship Rugby Union Team
- Taranaki Airs – NBL Basketball Team
- Taranaki Thunder – Women's Basketball Team
- Taranaki cricket team – Men's Cricket Team

== Notable people ==
- Harry Atkinson – Premier of New Zealand and Colonial Treasurer
- Peter Buck (Te Rangi Hīroa) of Ngāti Mutunga – Māori scholar, politician, military leader, health administrator, anthropologist, museum director, born in Urenui
- Richard Faull – New Zealand neuroscientist and academic, born and raised in Tikorangi
- Māui Wiremu Pita Naera Pōmare of Ngāti Mutunga – politician, Minister of Health
- Fiona Clark – Photographer.
- Frederic Carrington – surveyor and father of New Plymouth
- William Douglas Cook – founder of Eastwoodhill Arboretum, Ngatapa, Gisborne and of Pukeiti, world-famous rhododendron garden, New Plymouth.
- Hāmi Te Māunu – hereditary Maori leader of Ngāti Mutunga
- Wiremu Kīngi Te Rangitāke – Māori chief of Te Āti Awa, leader in the First Taranaki War
- William Malone – First World War officer
- Len Lye – artist, filmmaker born in Christchurch, collection only housed in New Plymouth
- Minarapa Rangihatuake – Methodist missionary, active from about 1839 in Taranaki
- Michael Smither – artist
- Ronald Syme – scholar of ancient history
- Riwha Titokowaru – Ngaruahine military war leader
- Te Whiti o Rongomai – spiritual leader of Parihaka and pioneer of peaceful protest strategies

=== Sports people ===
- All Blacks: Beauden Barrett, Scott Barrett, Jordie Barrett, Ross Brown, Peter Burke Grant Fox, Luke McAlister, Kayla McAlister, Graham Mourie, Conrad Smith, Carl Hayman, Mark Robertson
- Rugby League: Issac Luke, Curtis Rona, Howie Tamati Graham West
- Michael Campbell – golfer
- Paige Hareb – professional surfer
- Peter Snell – Gold medal-winning athlete, born in Ōpunake.
- Hannah Bromley – Former professional footballer.
- Mackenzie Barry – Footballer
- Stan Lay – Javelin
- Frank van Hattum – Footballer
- Duncan Laing – Swimming and surf life saving
- David Baldwin – Lawn Bowls
- Alistar Jordan – Cricket
- Norman Reed – Race walking
- Zoe Hobbs – Athletics
- Martin Donnelly – Cricket
- Will Young – Cricket
- Rugby 7s: World, Commonwealth, Olympic gold medalists Gayle Broughton & Michaela Blyde.

== See also ==
- First Taranaki War
- Second Taranaki War
- Tītokowaru's War
- New Zealand land confiscations
- Taranaki Rugby Football Union
- TSB Bank (New Zealand) – formerly Taranaki Savings Bank
- Water quality in Taranaki
- Govett-Brewster Art Gallery
- Puke Ariki
- Taranaki Cathedral
- List of historic places in New Plymouth
