= October 28 =

October 28 this year in various calendars
- Wednesday, 28 October 2026
Akan	Nkyiwukuo
Armenian	10 Trē 1476
Aztec	Atlcahualo 6, 6 Quiyahuitl
Babylonian	15 Tashritu, 2337 SE
Balinese pawukon	Menga, Kajeng, Sri, Pon, Urukung, Buda of Watugunung, Ludra, Erangan, Sri
Bengali	12 Kartik, BS 1433
Chinese	Yin Wood Pig・Wall Mansion; Fire Horse Year, Month 9, Day 19 (Shuangjiang, 10 days until Lidong)
Common Era	28 October 2026 CE
Coptic	18 Paopi, AM 1743
Egyptian	15 Phamenoth, 2775 NE
Ethiopian	18 Ṭeqemt, 2019 Amätä Məhrät
French Republican	Décade I, Sextidi de Brumaire de l'Année 235 de la République
Gregorian	28 October, AD 2026
Hebrew	17 Cheshvan, AM 5787
Hindu	Kṛttikā・Vyatīpāta; Solar: 11 Kārtika, 1948 SE; Lunisolar: Tr̥tīyā, Kṛishna pakṣa of Āśvina, 2083 VE; Rāudra・5127 KY・1,872,876
Icelandic	Miðvikudagur, 5 Gormánuður 2026
Islamic	16 Jumada al-awwal, AH 1448 (using tabular method)
ISO week date	2026-W44-3
Japanese	18 Nagatsuki, Reiwa 8 (Sōkō, 10 days until Rittō)
Julian	15 October, AD 2026 (AM 7535)
Julian day	2461342
Korean	18 Gaedal, 4359 DE
Maya	13.0.14.0.19; 12 Zac, 6 Cauac
Roman	Idibus Octobribus, MMDCCLXXIX AUC
Solar Hijri	6 Aban, SH 1405
Tibetan	18 tha skar, me pho rta 2153 or 1772 or 1000

<<	October					>>
Su	Mo	Tu	We	Th	Fr	Sa
				1	2	3
4	5	6	7	8	9	10
11	12	13	14	15	16	17
18	19	20	21	22	23	24
25	26	27	28	29	30	31
2026

October 28 in recent years
2026 (Wednesday)
2025 (Tuesday)
2024 (Monday)
2023 (Saturday)
2022 (Friday)
2021 (Thursday)
2020 (Wednesday)
2019 (Monday)
2018 (Sunday)
2017 (Saturday)

October 28 is the 301st day of the year (302nd in leap years) in the Gregorian calendar; 64 days remain until the end of the year.

== Events ==
=== Pre-1600 ===
- 97 – Roman emperor Nerva is forced by the Praetorian Guard to adopt general Marcus Ulpius Trajanus as his heir and successor.
- 306 – Maxentius is proclaimed Roman emperor.
- 312 – Constantine I defeats Maxentius in the battle of the Milvian Bridge, becoming the sole Roman emperor in the West.
- 969 – The Byzantine Empire recovers Antioch from Arab rule.
- 1061 – Pietro Cadalo is appointed by the German Imperial court as antipope to Pope Alexander II, who was elected in the previous month.
- 1344 – The lower town of Smyrna is captured by Latin Christians in response to Aydınid piracy during the Smyrniote crusades.
- 1420 – Beijing is officially designated the capital of the Ming dynasty when the Forbidden City is completed.
- 1449 – Christian I is crowned king of Denmark.
- 1453 – Ladislaus the Posthumous is crowned king of Bohemia in Prague.
- 1492 – Christopher Columbus lands in Cuba on his first voyage to the New World, surmising that it is Japan.
- 1516 – Second Ottoman–Mamluk War: Mamluks fail to stop the Ottoman advance towards Egypt at the Battle of Yaunis Khan.
- 1520 – Ferdinand Magellan reaches the Pacific Ocean.
- 1531 – Abyssinian–Adal war: The Adal Sultanate seizes southern Ethiopia.
- 1538 – The Universidad Santo Tomás de Aquino is founded in what is now the Dominican Republic.
- 1562 – James Stewart, 1st Earl of Moray, defeats the forces of the rebellious George Gordon, 4th Earl of Huntly, in the battle of Corrichie.

=== 1601–1900 ===
- 1628 – French Wars of Religion: The Siege of La Rochelle ends with the surrender of the Huguenots after fourteen months.
- 1636 – The Massachusetts Bay Colony votes to establish a theological college, which would later become Harvard University.
- 1640 – The Treaty of Ripon is signed, ending the hostilities of the Second Bishops' War.
- 1664 – The Duke of York and Albany's Maritime Regiment of Foot, later to be known as the Royal Marines, is established.
- 1707 – The 1707 Hōei earthquake causes more than 5,000 deaths in Japan.
- 1726 – The novel Gulliver's Travels written by Jonathan Swift is published.
- 1746 – The 1746 Lima–Callao earthquake causes up to 6,000 deaths in Peru, the deadliest in its history up to that point.
- 1776 – American Revolutionary War: British troops under General William Howe attack General George Washington's Continental Army and capture Chatterton Hill in the Battle of White Plains during the New York and New Jersey campaign.
- 1834 – The Pinjarra massacre occurs in the Swan River Colony. An estimated 30 Noongar people are killed by British colonists.
- 1835 – The United Tribes of New Zealand are established with the signature of the Declaration of Independence.
- 1864 – American Civil War: In East Tennessee, Union forces under General Alvan C. Gillem rout Confederate troops under General John C. Vaughn during the Battle of Morristown.
- 1886 – US president Grover Cleveland dedicates the Statue of Liberty.
- 1891 – The Mino–Owari earthquake, the largest inland earthquake in Japan's history, occurs.
- 1893 – Pyotr Tchaikovsky's Symphony No. 6 in B Minor, Pathétique receives its première performance only nine days before the composer's death.

=== 1901–present ===
- 1918 – World War I: A new Polish government in western Galicia is established, triggering the Polish–Ukrainian War.
- 1918 – World War I: Czech politicians peacefully take over the city of Prague, thus establishing the First Czechoslovak Republic.
- 1919 – The U.S. Congress passes the Volstead Act over President Woodrow Wilson's veto, paving the way for Prohibition to begin the following January.
- 1922 – Italian fascists led by Benito Mussolini march on Rome and take over the Italian government.
- 1928 – Indonesia Raya, now the national anthem of Indonesia, is first played during the Second Indonesian Youth Congress.
- 1940 – World War II: Greece rejects Italy's ultimatum. Italy invades Greece through Albania a few hours later.
- 1942 – The Alaska Highway first connects Alaska to the North American railway network at Dawson Creek in Canada.
- 1948 – Paul Hermann Müller is awarded the Nobel Prize in Physiology or Medicine for his discovery of the insecticidal properties of DDT.
- 1948 – Ecological disaster in Donora, Pennsylvania.
- 1949 – An Air France Lockheed Constellation crashes in the Azores, killing all 48 people on board.
- 1954 – Aeroflot Flight 136 crashes near Krasnoyarsk, killing 19.
- 1956 – Hungarian Revolution: A de facto ceasefire comes into effect between armed revolutionaries and Soviet troops, who begin to withdraw from Budapest. Communist officials and facilities come under attack by revolutionaries.
- 1958 – John XXIII is elected Pope.
- 1962 – The Cuban Missile Crisis ends and Premier Nikita Khrushchev orders the removal of Soviet missiles from Cuba.
- 1965 – Pope Paul VI promulgates Nostra aetate, by which the Roman Catholic Church officially recognizes the legitimacy of non-Christian faiths.
- 1971 – Prospero becomes the only British satellite to be launched by a British rocket.
- 1982 – The Spanish general election begins fourteen years of rule by the Spanish Socialist Workers' Party.
- 1989 – Aloha Island Air Flight 1712, a Twin Otter 300, crashed into terrain at night in Hawaii killing all 20 occupants onboard.
- 1990 – Georgia holds its only free election under Soviet rule.
- 1995 – The Baku Metro fire sees 289 people killed and 270 injured.
- 2006 – A funeral service takes place at the Bykivnia graves for Ukrainians who were killed by the Soviet secret police.
- 2007 – Cristina Fernández de Kirchner becomes the first directly elected female President of Argentina.
- 2009 – The 28 October 2009 Peshawar bombing kills 117 and wounds 213.
- 2009 – NASA successfully launches the Ares I-X mission, the only rocket launch for its short-lived Constellation program.
- 2009 – US President Barack Obama signs the Matthew Shepard and James Byrd Jr. Hate Crimes Prevention Act.
- 2013 – Five people are killed and 38 are injured after a car crashes into barriers at Tiananmen Square in China.
- 2014 – A rocket carrying NASA's Cygnus CRS Orb-3 resupply mission to the International Space Station explodes seconds after taking off from the Mid-Atlantic Regional Spaceport in Wallops Island, Virginia.
- 2018 – Jair Bolsonaro is elected president of Brazil with 57 million votes, with Workers' Party candidate Fernando Haddad as the runner-up. It is the first time in 16 years that a Workers' Party candidate is not elected president.
- 2023 – The 2023 Rugby World Cup final is held at the Stade de France in Saint-Denis, France. It saw South Africa defeat New Zealand 12 to 11, claiming their fourth Webb Ellis Cup, becoming the first nation to do so.
- 2025 – Hurricane Melissa makes landfall near Black River, Jamaica, killing over 30 people, as well as tying the 1935 Labor Day hurricane as the most intense landfall in the North Atlantic.
- 2026 – Two high-speed trains collide in Los Yébenes, south of Madrid, Spain, killing 69 passengers and injuring nearly 200.

== Births ==
=== Pre-1600 ===
- 1017 – Henry III, Holy Roman Emperor (died 1056)
- 1466 – Erasmus, Dutch philosopher (died 1536)
- 1479 – John Gage, English courtier (died 1556)
- 1510 – Francis Borgia, 4th Duke of Gandía, Spanish priest and saint, 3rd Superior General of the Society of Jesus (died 1572)
- 1550 – Stanislaus Kostka, Polish saint (died 1568)
- 1585 – Cornelius Jansen, Dutch bishop and theologian (died 1638)
- 1599 – Marie of the Incarnation, foundress of the Ursuline Monastery in Quebec (died 1672)

=== 1601–1900 ===
- 1610 – Jacob Kettler, 3rd duke of Courland and Semigallia (died 1682)
- 1667 – Maria Anna of Neuburg, Queen consort of Spain
- 1690 – Peter Tordenskjold, Norwegian admiral (died 1720)
- 1693 – Šimon Brixi, Czech composer (died 1735)
- 1696 – Maurice de Saxe, French general (died 1750)
- 1703 – Antoine Deparcieux, French mathematician and engineer (died 1768)
- 1718 – Ignacije Szentmartony, Croatian priest, mathematician, astronomer, and explorer (died 1793)
- 1733 – Franz Ignaz von Beecke, German composer (died 1803)
- 1754 – John Laurens, American soldier (died 1782)
- 1767 – Marie of Hesse-Kassel (died 1852)
- 1793 – Eliphalet Remington, American businessman, founded Remington Arms (died 1861)
- 1794 – Robert Liston, Scottish surgeon (died 1847)
- 1804 – Pierre François Verhulst, Belgian mathematician and theorist (died 1849)
- 1815 – Ľudovít Štúr, Slovak philologist and politician (died 1856)
- 1816 – Malwida von Meysenbug, German writer (died 1903)
- 1837 – Tokugawa Yoshinobu, Japanese shōgun (died 1913)
- 1839 – Edward P. Allen, American captain, lawyer, and politician (died 1909)
- 1845 – Zygmunt Florenty Wróblewski, Polish physicist and chemist (died 1888)
- 1846 – Auguste Escoffier, French chef and author (died 1935)
- 1854 – Jean-Marie Guyau, French philosopher and poet (died 1888)
- 1860 – Kanō Jigorō, Japanese martial artist (died 1938)
- 1864 – Adolfo Camarillo, Mexican-American rancher and philanthropist (died 1958)
- 1867 – Sister Nivedita, Irish-Indian nurse, author, and educator (died 1911)
- 1875 – Gilbert Hovey Grosvenor, Turkish-Canadian journalist (died 1966)
- 1877 – Joe Adams, American baseball player and manager (died 1952)
- 1879 – Channing H. Cox, American lawyer and politician, 49th Governor of Massachusetts (died 1968)
- 1880 – Wilhelm Anderson, Belarusian-Estonian astrophysicist and astronomer (died 1940)
- 1880 – Billy Wedlock, English footballer (died 1965)
- 1881 – Vin Coutie, Australian footballer (died 1951)
- 1884 – William Douglas Cook, New Zealand horticulturalist, founded Eastwoodhill Arboretum (died 1967)
- 1886 – O. G. S. Crawford, British archaeologist (died 1957)
- 1886 – Noel Macklin, English soldier and engineer (died 1946)
- 1888 – Christopher Vane, 10th Baron Barnard, English soldier and politician, Lord Lieutenant of Durham (died 1964)
- 1889 – Juliette Béliveau, Canadian actress and singer (died 1975)
- 1892 – Dink Johnson, American pianist, drummer, and clarinet player (died 1954)
- 1893 – Christopher Kelk Ingold, British chemist (died 1970)
- 1896 – Howard Hanson, American composer, conductor, and educator (died 1981)
- 1897 – Edith Head, American costume designer (died 1981)
- 1897 – Hans Speidel, German general (died 1984)

=== 1901–present ===
- 1901 – Ambrogio Gianotti, Italian partigiano and priest (died 1969)
- 1901 – Eileen Shanahan, Irish poet (died 1979)
- 1902 – Elsa Lanchester, English-American actress and singer (died 1986)
- 1903 – John Chamberlain, American historian, journalist, and critic (died 1995)
- 1903 – Evelyn Waugh, English journalist, author, and critic (died 1966)
- 1904 – George Dangerfield, English-American historian, journalist, and author (died 1986)
- 1905 – Tatyana Ehrenfest, Dutch mathematician (died 1984)
- 1907 – John Hewitt, Irish poet, playwright, and critic (died 1987)
- 1908 – Arturo Frondizi, Argentinian lawyer and politician, 32nd President of Argentina (died 1995)
- 1909 – Francis Bacon, Irish painter and illustrator (died 1992)
- 1912 – Richard Doll, English physiologist and epidemiologist (died 2005)
- 1914 – Glenn Robert Davis, American lieutenant and politician (died 1988)
- 1914 – Jonas Salk, American biologist and physician (died 1995)
- 1914 – Richard Laurence Millington Synge, English biochemist and academic, Nobel Prize laureate (died 1994)
- 1916 – Pearl Hackney, English actress (died 2009)
- 1917 – Jack Soo, American actor and singer (died 1979)
- 1919 – Walt Hansgen, American race car driver (died 1966)
- 1919 – Hans Klenk, German race car driver (died 2009)
- 1921 – Azumafuji Kin'ichi, Japanese sumo wrestler, the 40th Yokozuna (died 1973)
- 1922 – Gershon Kingsley, German-American pianist, composer, and conductor (died 2019)
- 1922 – Simon Muzenda, Zimbabwe politician, 1st Vice President of Zimbabwe (died 2003)
- 1922 – Butch van Breda Kolff, American basketball player and coach (died 2007)
- 1923 – John Connell, American actor (died 2015)
- 1924 – Antonio Creus, Spanish race car driver and motorcycle racer (died 1996)
- 1924 – Peddibhotla Suryakantam, Telugu actress (died 1994)
- 1925 – Ian Hamilton Finlay, Bahamian-Scottish poet, sculptor, and gardener (died 2006)
- 1926 – Bowie Kuhn, American lawyer and businessman, 5th Commissioner of Baseball (died 2007)
- 1927 – Cleo Laine, English singer and actress (died 2025)
- 1928 – Ion Mihai Pacepa, Romanian general (died 2021)
- 1928 – William Rodgers, Baron Rodgers of Quarry Bank, English politician, Shadow Secretary of State for Defence
- 1929 – Marcel Bozzuffi, French actor, director, and screenwriter (died 1988)
- 1929 – Virginia Held, American philosopher, author, and academic (died 2026)
- 1929 – John Hollander, American poet, critic, and educator (died 2013)
- 1929 – Joan Plowright, English actress (died 2025)
- 1930 – Bernie Ecclestone, English businessman
- 1931 – Harold Battiste, American saxophonist, pianist, and composer (died 2015)
- 1932 – Spyros Kyprianou, Cypriot lawyer and politician, 2nd President of Cyprus (died 2002)
- 1932 – Suzy Parker, American model and actress (died 2003)
- 1933 – Garrincha, Brazilian footballer (died 1983)
- 1933 – Michael Noakes, English painter and illustrator (died 2018)
- 1934 – Charles A. Gargano, American diplomat, businessman and government official
- 1935 – Alan Clarke, English director and screenwriter (died 1990)
- 1936 – Charlie Daniels, American singer-songwriter, fiddle-player and guitarist (died 2020)
- 1936 – Ted Hawkins, American soul-blues singer-songwriter and guitarist (died 1995)
- 1937 – Graham Bond, English keyboard player, singer, and saxophonist (died 1974)
- 1937 – Lenny Wilkens, American basketball player and coach (died 2025)
- 1938 – Keigo Abe, Japanese martial artist and coach (died 2019)
- 1938 – Kenneth Best, Liberian journalist, founded The Daily Observer
- 1938 – Howard Blake, English composer and conductor
- 1938 – Dave Budd, American basketball player
- 1938 – Gary Cowan, Canadian golfer
- 1938 – David Dimbleby, English journalist
- 1938 – Anne Perry, English author (died 2023)
- 1939 – Jane Alexander, American actress and producer
- 1939 – Andy Bey, American singer and pianist
- 1939 – Miroslav Cerar, Slovenian gymnast and lawyer
- 1939 – Curtis Lee, American singer-songwriter (died 2015)
- 1940 – Susan Harris, American screenwriter and producer
- 1941 – Hank Marvin, English singer and guitarist
- 1942 – Terence Donovan, English-Australian actor (died 2026)
- 1942 – Abdelkader Fréha, Algerian footballer (died 2012)
- 1942 – Gillian Lovegrove, English computer scientist and academic
- 1942 – Kees Verkerk, Dutch speed skater
- 1943 – Jimmy McRae, Scottish race car driver
- 1943 – Karalyn Patterson, English psychologist and academic
- 1944 – Gerry Anderson, Irish radio and television host (died 2014)
- 1944 – Coluche, French comedian and actor (died 1986)
- 1944 – Dennis Franz, American actor
- 1944 – Anton Schlecker, German businessman, founded the Schlecker Company
- 1945 – Sandy Berger, American lawyer and politician, 19th United States National Security Advisor (died 2015)
- 1945 – Wayne Fontana, English pop singer (died 2020)
- 1945 – Don Iverson, American golfer
- 1946 – John Hewson, Australian economist and politician
- 1946 – Wim Jansen, Dutch footballer and manager (died 2022)
- 1946 – Sharon Thesen, Canadian poet and academic
- 1948 – Telma Hopkins, American singer and actress
- 1949 – Dwight Davis, American basketball player
- 1949 – Caitlyn Jenner, American decathlete and actress
- 1950 – Sihem Bensedrine, Tunisian journalist and activist
- 1950 – Ludo Delcroix, Belgian cyclist
- 1951 – Peter Hitchens, English journalist and author
- 1951 – Joe R. Lansdale, American martial artist and author
- 1952 – Annie Potts, American actress
- 1953 – Pierre Boivin, Canadian businessman
- 1953 – Desmond Child, American musician, songwriter, and producer
- 1955 – Bill Gates, American businessman and philanthropist, co-founded Microsoft
- 1955 – Indra Nooyi, Indian-American businesswoman
- 1956 – Mahmoud Ahmadinejad, Iranian engineer and politician, 6th President of Iran
- 1956 – Volker Zotz, Austrian philosopher, scholar, and author
- 1957 – Marian Bell, English economist and academic
- 1957 – Stephen Morris, English drummer
- 1957 – Zach Wamp, American businessman and politician
- 1958 – Concha García Campoy, Spanish journalist (died 2013)
- 1958 – Ashok Chavan, Indian businessman and politician, 16th Chief Minister of Maharashtra
- 1958 – William Reid, Scottish singer-songwriter and guitarist
- 1959 – James Keelaghan, Canadian singer-songwriter and producer
- 1959 – Toshio Masuda, Japanese composer
- 1959 – Randy Wittman, American basketball player and coach
- 1960 – Landon Curt Noll, American computer scientist and mathematician
- 1962 – Erik Thorstvedt, Norwegian footballer and manager
- 1962 – Daphne Zuniga, American actress
- 1963 – Kevin Dineen, Canadian ice hockey player and coach
- 1963 – Lauren Holly, American actress
- 1963 – Sheryl Underwood, American comedian, actress, and talk show host
- 1964 – Andrew Bridgen, English soldier and politician
- 1964 – Peter Coyne, Australian rugby league player
- 1965 – Jami Gertz, American actress
- 1965 – David Warburton, English pianist, businessman, and politician
- 1965 – Miyako Yoshida, Japanese ballerina
- 1966 – Steve Atwater, American football player
- 1966 – Chris Bauer, American actor
- 1966 – Matt Drudge, American blogger and activist, founded the Drudge Report
- 1966 – Andy Richter, American actor, producer, and screenwriter
- 1966 – Aris Spiliotopoulos, Greek politician, Greek Minister of Education and Religious Affairs
- 1967 – Kevin Macdonald, Scottish director, producer, and screenwriter
- 1967 – Julia Roberts, American actress and producer
- 1967 – John Romero, American video game designer, co-founded Id Software
- 1968 – Chris Broussard, American journalist and sportscaster
- 1968 – Marc Lièvremont, French rugby player and coach
- 1968 – Mayumi Ozaki, Japanese wrestler
- 1969 – Steven Chamuleau, Dutch cardiologist
- 1969 – Jeremy Davies, American actor
- 1969 – Javier Grillo-Marxuach, Puerto Rican screenwriter and producer
- 1969 – Ben Harper, American singer-songwriter and guitarist
- 1969 – Wolfgang Kocevar, Austrian politician
- 1969 – Noriyoshi Omichi, Japanese baseball player and coach
- 1970 – Alan Peter Cayetano, Filipino politician and Secretary of Foreign Affairs of the Philippines
- 1970 – Greg Eagles, American voice actor and producer
- 1971 – Roxana Briban, Romanian soprano and actress (died 2010)
- 1971 – Caroline Dinenage, English businesswoman and politician
- 1972 – Terrell Davis, American football player and sportscaster
- 1972 – Brad Paisley, American singer-songwriter and guitarist
- 1972 – Trista Sutter, American reality star
- 1973 – Montel Vontavious Porter, American wrestler and actor
- 1973 – Aleksandar Stanojević, Serbian footballer and manager
- 1974 – Braden Looper, American baseball player
- 1974 – Vicente Moreno, Spanish footballer and manager
- 1974 – Joaquin Phoenix, American actor and producer
- 1974 – Dejan Stefanović, Serbian footballer and coach
- 1974 – Dayanara Torres, Puerto Rican actress and singer, Miss Universe 1993
- 1976 – Keiron Cunningham, British rugby league player and coach
- 1976 – Martin Lepa, Estonian footballer
- 1976 – Simone Loria, Italian footballer
- 1976 – Karl Tremblay, Canadian singer (died 2023)
- 1978 – Gwendoline Christie, English actress
- 1978 – Justin Guarini, American singer-songwriter and actor
- 1979 – Olcay Çetinkaya, Turkish footballer
- 1979 – Jawed Karim, American computer scientist
- 1979 – Martin Škoula, Czech ice hockey player
- 1980 – Christy Hemme, American wrestler and ring announcer
- 1980 – Agnes Obel, Danish singer-songwriter and pianist
- 1980 – Natina Reed, American rapper and actress (died 2012)
- 1980 – Alan Smith, English footballer and coach
- 1981 – Milan Baroš, Czech footballer
- 1981 – Shane Gore, English footballer
- 1981 – Nate McLouth, American baseball player
- 1981 – Nick Montgomery, English-Scottish footballer
- 1982 – Jeremy Bonderman, American baseball player
- 1982 – Enver Jääger, Estonian footballer
- 1982 – Anthony Lerew, American baseball player
- 1982 – Hironori Saruta, Japanese footballer
- 1982 – Matt Smith, English actor and director
- 1983 – Jarrett Jack, American basketball player
- 1983 – Kayo Noro, Japanese singer and actress
- 1983 – Joe Thomas, English actor and screenwriter
- 1984 – Bryn Evans, New Zealand rugby player
- 1984 – Obafemi Martins, Nigerian footballer
- 1984 – Finn Wittrock, American actor
- 1985 – Tyrone Barnett, English footballer
- 1985 – Troian Bellisario, American actress
- 1985 – Anthony Fantano, American music critic
- 1986 – May Calamawy, Egyptian-Palestinian actress
- 1986 – Isabelle Eriksson, Swedish athlete
- 1986 – Anthony Griffith, English footballer
- 1986 – Aki Toyosaki, Japanese voice actress and singer
- 1987 – Frank Ocean, American singer-songwriter
- 1988 – Edd Gould, English cartoonist and animator (died 2012)
- 1988 – Devon Murray, Irish actor
- 1988 – Jamie xx, English musician, DJ, record producer and remixer
- 1989 – Devin Ebanks, American basketball player
- 1989 – Camille Muffat, French swimmer (died 2015)
- 1991 – Lucy Bronze, English footballer
- 1992 – Lexi Ainsworth, American actress
- 1992 – Jeon Ji-hee, South Korean table tennis player
- 1992 – Maria Sergejeva, Estonian figure skater
- 1994 – Andrew Harrison, American basketball player
- 1995 – Glen Kamara, Finnish footballer
- 1995 – Jae'Sean Tate, American basketball player
- 1995 – An Ye-seul, South Korean singer
- 1996 – Jasmine Jessica Anthony, American actress
- 1996 – Jack Eichel, American ice hockey player
- 1997 – Stetson Bennett, American football player
- 1997 – Taylor Fritz, American tennis player
- 1997 – Georgia Godwin, Australian artistic gymnast
- 1998 – Nolan Gould, American actor
- 1999 – Amber Glenn, American figure skater
- 2001 – Sonay Kartal, British tennis player
- 2006 – Yoon Do-young, South Korean footballer
- 2008 – Reese Esponda, American artistic gymnast

== Deaths ==
=== Pre-1600 ===
- 312 – Maxentius, Roman emperor (born 278)
- 457 – Ibas of Edessa, Syrian bishop
- 816 – Beggo, count of Toulouse and Paris
- 875 – Remigius of Lyon, Frankish archbishop
- 1138 – King Bolesław III Wrymouth of Poland
- 1225 – Jien, Japanese monk, historian, and poet (born 1155)
- 1266 – Saint Arsenije I Sremac
- 1310 – Ecumenical Patriarch Athanasius I of Constantinople (born 1230)
- 1312 – Elizabeth of Carinthia, Queen of Germany (born 1262)
- 1412 – Margaret I of Denmark (born 1353)
- 1468 – Bianca Maria Visconti, Duchess of Milan (born 1425)
- 1568 – Ashikaga Yoshihide, Japanese shōgun (born 1539)
- 1592 – Ogier Ghiselin de Busbecq, Flemish diplomat
- 1594 – Ōkubo Tadayo, Japanese general (born 1532)

=== 1601–1900 ===
- 1627 – Jahangir, Mughal Emperor of India (born 1569)
- 1639 – Stefano Landi, Italian composer and educator (born 1587)
- 1646 – William Dobson, English painter (born 1610)
- 1661 – Agustín Moreto y Cavana, Spanish priest and playwright (born 1618)
- 1676 – Jean Desmarets, French author, poet, and playwright (born 1595)
- 1703 – John Wallis, English mathematician and cryptographer (born 1616)
- 1704 – John Locke, English physician and philosopher (born 1632)
- 1708 – Prince George of Denmark, Duke of Cumberland (born 1653)
- 1716 – Stephen Fox, English politician (born 1627)
- 1740 – Anna of Russia (born 1693)
- 1754 – Friedrich von Hagedorn, German poet (born 1708)
- 1755 – Joseph Bodin de Boismortier, French composer (born 1689)
- 1763 – Heinrich von Brühl, German general and politician (born 1700)
- 1768 – Michel Blavet, French flute player and composer (born 1700)
- 1787 – Johann Karl August Musäus, German author (born 1735)
- 1792 – Paul Möhring, German physician, botanist, and zoologist (born 1710)
- 1792 – John Smeaton, English engineer, designed the Coldstream Bridge and Perth Bridge (born 1724)
- 1800 – Artemas Ward, American general and politician (born 1727)
- 1806 – Charlotte Turner Smith, English poet and author (born 1749)
- 1818 – Abigail Adams, American writer and second First Lady of the United States (born 1744)
- 1841 – Johan August Arfwedson, Swedish chemist and academic (born 1792)
- 1857 – Louis-Eugène Cavaignac, French general and politician, 26th Prime Minister of France (born 1802)
- 1877 – Robert Swinhoe, English ornithologist and entomologist (born 1835)
- 1879 – Marie Roch Louis Reybaud, French economist and politician (born 1799)
- 1899 – Ottmar Mergenthaler, German-American engineer, invented the Linotype machine (born 1854)
- 1900 – Max Müller, German philologist and orientalist (born 1823)

=== 1901–present ===
- 1906 – Jean Benner, French artist (born 1836)
- 1914 – Richard Heuberger, Austrian composer and critic (born 1850)
- 1916 – Cleveland Abbe, American meteorologist and academic (born 1838)
- 1916 – Oswald Boelcke, German WWI flying ace (born 1891)
- 1917 – Prince Christian of Schleswig-Holstein (born 1831)
- 1917 – Dimitrios Votsis, Greek lawyer and politician (born 1841)
- 1918 – Ulisse Dini, Italian mathematician and politician (born 1845)
- 1929 – Bernhard von Bülow, German soldier and politician, Chancellor of Germany (born 1849)
- 1936 – Newton Moore, Australian soldier and politician, 8th Premier of Western Australia (born 1870)
- 1939 – Alice Brady, American actress (born 1892)
- 1941 – Filipp Goloshchyokin, Soviet politician (born 1876)
- 1945 – Kesago Nakajima, Japanese general (born 1881)
- 1952 – Billy Hughes, English-Australian politician, 7th Prime Minister of Australia (born 1862)
- 1957 – Ernst Gräfenberg, German-American physician and gynecologist (born 1881)
- 1959 – Camilo Cienfuegos, Cuban soldier (born 1932)
- 1963 – Mart Saar, Estonian organist and composer (born 1882)
- 1965 – Thomas Graham Brown, Scottish mountaineer and physiologist (born 1882)
- 1969 – Constance Dowling, American model and actress (born 1920)
- 1970 – Baby Huey, American singer-songwriter (born 1944)
- 1973 – Taha Hussein, Egyptian historian, author, and academic (born 1889)
- 1973 – Sergio Tofano, Italian actor, director, and playwright (born 1883)
- 1975 – Georges Carpentier, French boxer and actor (born 1894)
- 1975 – Oliver Nelson, American saxophonist, clarinet player, and composer (born 1932)
- 1976 – Aarne Juutilainen, Finnish army captain (born 1904)
- 1978 – Rukmani Devi, Sri Lankan singer and actress (born 1923)
- 1983 – Otto Messmer, American animator and screenwriter (born 1892)
- 1986 – John Braine, English author (born 1922)
- 1987 – D. Djajakusuma, Indonesian filmmaker (born 1918)
- 1987 – André Masson, French soldier and painter (born 1896)
- 1989 – Henry Hall, English bandleader, composer, and actor (born 1898)
- 1993 – Juri Lotman, Russian-Estonian historian and scholar (born 1922)
- 1997 – Paul Jarrico, American screenwriter and producer (born 1915)
- 1998 – Ted Hughes, English poet and playwright (born 1930)
- 1999 – Antonios Katinaris, Greek singer-songwriter (born 1931)
- 2000 – Andújar Cedeño, Dominican baseball player (born 1969)
- 2001 – Gerard Hengeveld, Dutch pianist, composer, and educator (born 1910)
- 2002 – Margaret Booth, American screenwriter and producer (born 1898)
- 2002 – Erling Persson, Swedish businessman, founded H&M (born 1917)
- 2003 – Sally Baldwin, Scottish social sciences professor (born 1940)
- 2004 – Eugene K. Bird, American colonel and author, US Commandant of Spandau Prison (born 1926)
- 2005 – Bob Broeg, American soldier and journalist (born 1918)
- 2005 – Raymond Hains, French photographer (born 1926)
- 2005 – Tony Jackson, American basketball player (born 1942)
- 2005 – Fernando Quejas, Cape Verdean-Portuguese singer-songwriter (born 1922)
- 2005 – Richard Smalley, American chemist and academic, Nobel Prize laureate (born 1943)
- 2005 – Ljuba Tadić, Serbian actor and screenwriter (born 1929)
- 2006 – Red Auerbach, American basketball player and coach (born 1917)
- 2006 – Trevor Berbick, Jamaican-Canadian boxer (born 1954)
- 2006 – Marijohn Wilkin, American guitarist and songwriter (born 1920)
- 2007 – Takao Fujinami, Japanese lawyer and politician (born 1932)
- 2007 – Porter Wagoner, American singer-songwriter and guitarist (born 1927)
- 2009 – Taylor Mitchell, Canadian singer-songwriter and guitarist (born 1990)
- 2010 – Liang Congjie, Chinese historian and activist, founded Friends of Nature (born 1932)
- 2010 – James MacArthur, American actor (born 1937)
- 2010 – Jonathan Motzfeldt, Greenlandic politician, 1st Prime Minister of Greenland (born 1938)
- 2010 – Ehud Netzer, Israeli archaeologist, architect, and educator (born 1934)
- 2011 – Tom Addington, English soldier (born 1919)
- 2012 – Gordon Bilney, Australian dentist and politician (born 1939)
- 2012 – John Cheffers, Australian footballer and coach (born 1936)
- 2012 – Jack Dellal, English businessman (born 1923)
- 2013 – Tetsuharu Kawakami, Japanese baseball player and manager (born 1920)
- 2013 – Tadeusz Mazowiecki, Polish journalist and politician, Prime Minister of Poland (born 1927)
- 2013 – Aleksandar Tijanić, Serbian journalist (born 1949)
- 2013 – Rajendra Yadav, Indian author (born 1929)
- 2014 – Galway Kinnell, American poet and academic (born 1927)
- 2014 – Michael Sata, Zambian police officer and politician, 5th President of Zambia (born 1937)
- 2018 – Colin Sylvia, Australian rules footballer (born 1985)
- 2022 – Jerry Lee Lewis, American singer-songwriter and pianist (born 1935)
- 2023 – Matthew Perry, American-Canadian actor (born 1969)
- 2023 – Adam Johnson, American ice hockey player (born 1994)
- 2024 – Renato Martino, Italian Roman Catholic cardinal (born 1932)
- 2024 – Paul Morrissey, American director, producer, and screenwriter (born 1938)
- 2024 – Jamshid Sharmahd, German-American affiliate of Kingdom Assembly of Iran (born 1955)
- 2024 – Kazuo Umezu, Japanese manga artist (born 1936)
- 2026 – Barbara Barrie, American actress and author (born 1931)
- 2026 – Dolores Huerta, American labor leader (born 1930)
- 2026 – Patrick Stewart, English actor, director, and producer (born 1940)

== Holidays and observances ==
- Christian feast day:
  - Abdias of Babylon
  - Abgar V of Edessa (Eastern Orthodox Church)
  - Eadsige
  - Faro
  - Fidelis of Como (Roman Catholic Church)
  - Firmilian
  - Francis Serrano
  - Godwin of Stavelot
  - Job of Pochayiv (repose) (Eastern Orthodox Church)
  - The Apostles Simon and Jude (Western Christianity)
  - Lord of Miracles (Lima)
  - October 28 (Eastern Orthodox liturgics)
- Day of the Establishment of an Independent Czecho-Slovak State, celebrates the independence of Czechoslovakia from Austria-Hungary in 1918. (Czech Republic and Slovakia)
- International Animation Day (ASIFA)
- Ohi Day (Greece, Cyprus and the Greek communities), a national day in Greece.
- Prefectural Earthquake Disaster Prevention Day (Gifu Prefecture)
- Youth Pledge Day or Hari Sumpah Pemuda (Indonesia)
- Anniversary of the liberation of Ukraine from the Nazis, celebrating the liberation from Nazi German troops of the territory of current Ukraine
