= Hackfalls Arboretum =

Arboretum in Gisborne, New Zealand

Coordinates: 38.7699°S 177.5408°E

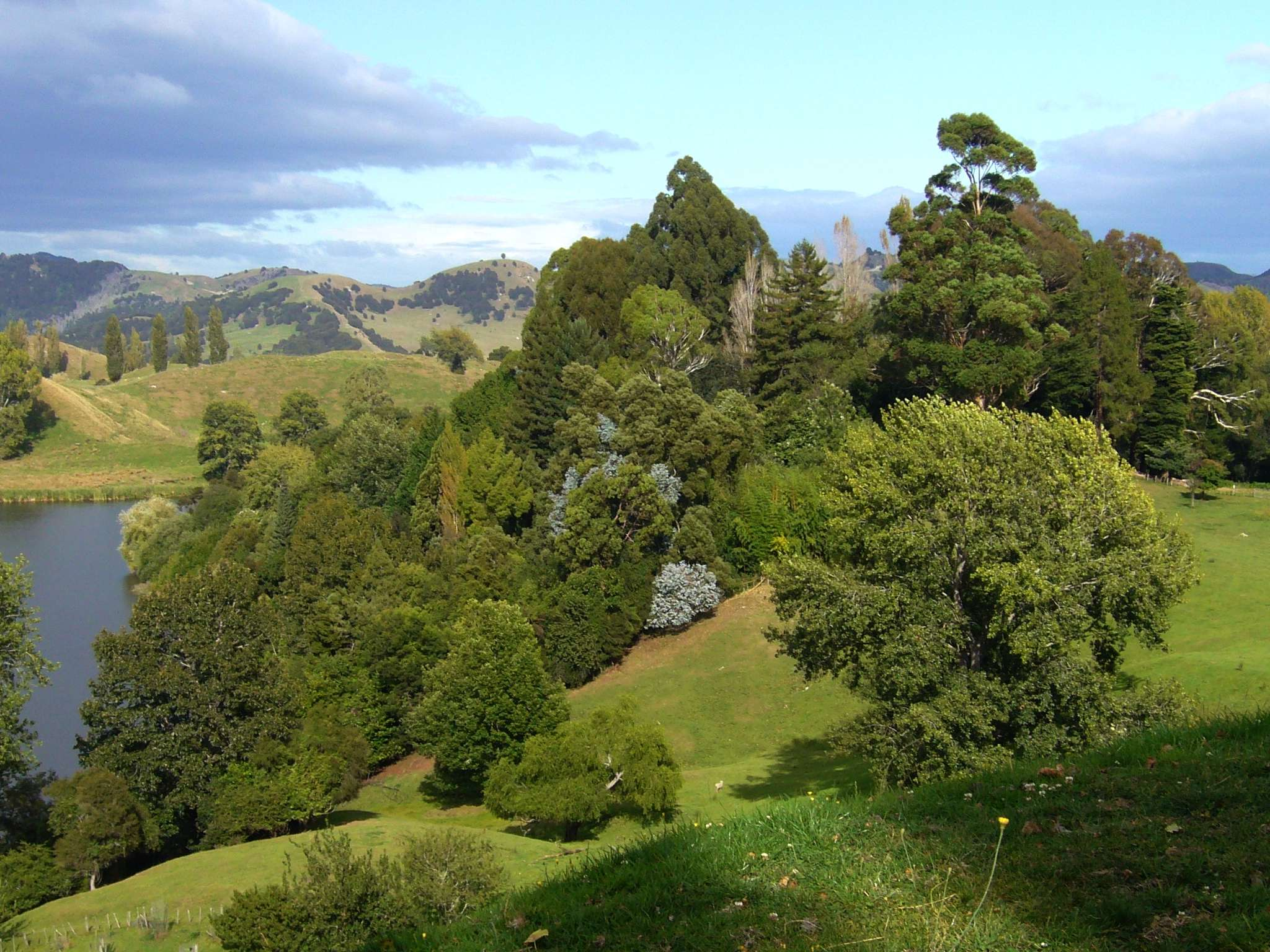
View of Hackfalls Arboretum with Lake Karangata

Hackfalls Arboretum is an arboretum in New Zealand. It was founded in the 1950s by Bob Berry. It is part of Hackfalls Station, a sheep and cattle farm of about 10 square kilometres, owned by the Berry family. The farm is in Tiniroto, a tiny village in the eastern part of the North Island, between Gisborne (town) and Wairoa.
The arboretum covers 0.56 km^{2}, along the borders of two lakes, and has about 3,500 species of trees and shrubs. It includes many different oaks "spaced in rolling pastureland, allowing each to develop fully, and limbed up to enable grass to grow underneath". The most important part of the collection is about 50 different taxa of Mexican oaks.

== Geography ==
Tiniroto is situated on the inland road (the so-called Tiniroto Road, former State Highway (SH) 36) between Gisborne and Wairoa. The distance from Gisborne is about 60 km, from Wairoa 40. The Ruakaka Road is a gravel road of about 20 km, that leads from Tiniroto, with a wide curve, crossing the Hangaroa River two times, past Donneraille Park, back to the Tiniroto Road. Berry Road branches off from this Ruakaka Road about 1 km outside Tiniroto. 3 km further up on Berry Road is the homestead of Hackfalls. You have then passed Lake Kaikiore which together with Lake Karangata form the “wetlands” of Hackfalls Station. Lake Kaikiore is 5 ha, Lake Karangata 10 ha.

Altitude on Hackfalls Station varies between about 120 m and 388 m, being 270 m at the homestead. The hill country of the Tiniroto district was formed in a big landslide from the North and East which occurred thousands of years ago. The lakes around Tiniroto were formed then. On steeper slopes the soils are derived from a yellow clay. On more level areas the soils consist of volcanic ash deposits (pumice) of about 50 cm. The station has an average annual rainfall of about 1,650 mm, with a few light snowfalls expected each winter.

The Māori occupation brought fires which destroyed much of the original forest cover, except in ravines and near the Hangaroa River. From 1880 onward, European settlers cleared most of the remaining forest, scrubs and ferns, replacing it by grassland. At Hackfalls a few remnants of the original plant cover remain, the largest of which consists of about 40,000 square metres, protected by a Queen Elizabeth II Trust covenant since 1985.

== Hackfalls Station ==
The Whyte family from Scotland were the first European settlers that acquired the station. They called it 'Abbotsford'. The Berry family, who originally came from Knaresborough in Yorkshire, arrived in North Canterbury in 1883 and settled at Tiniroto in 1889. Later the family moved to Gisborne. In 1916 the Berry family bought 'Abbotsford' off the Whyte family and settled there. The name Hackfalls was given to the new property in 1984 when Bob's niece Diane and her husband Kevin Playle bought into and ran the stock side of the station, which left Bob free to concentrate on the arboretum from then on. The name Hackfalls was chosen as it is where the original Berry family lived in Yorkshire, England – Hackfall Wood, a forested wilderness in a deep part of the valley of the River Ure near the village of Grewelthorpe. “Its resemblance to the appearance of the Hangaroa as it would have appeared in 1889 is probably why Bobs grandfather assigned the name to the farm”.

It was not until 1950 that Berry road was metalled. Electricity did also not arrive until that time.

Hackfalls Station covers an area of about 10 square kilometres of hill country. The eastern and northern border are formed by Hangaroa River. The western border is roughly the Ruakaka Road. To the south the border is fenced. The station is a sheep and cattle breeding and fattening farm. Normal stock carrying capacity on the station is approximately 8000 stock units (sheep and cattle).
Hackfalls Arboretum covers 0.56 km^{2} of the Station. Most of the arboretum is grazed by sheep, sometimes by cattle.

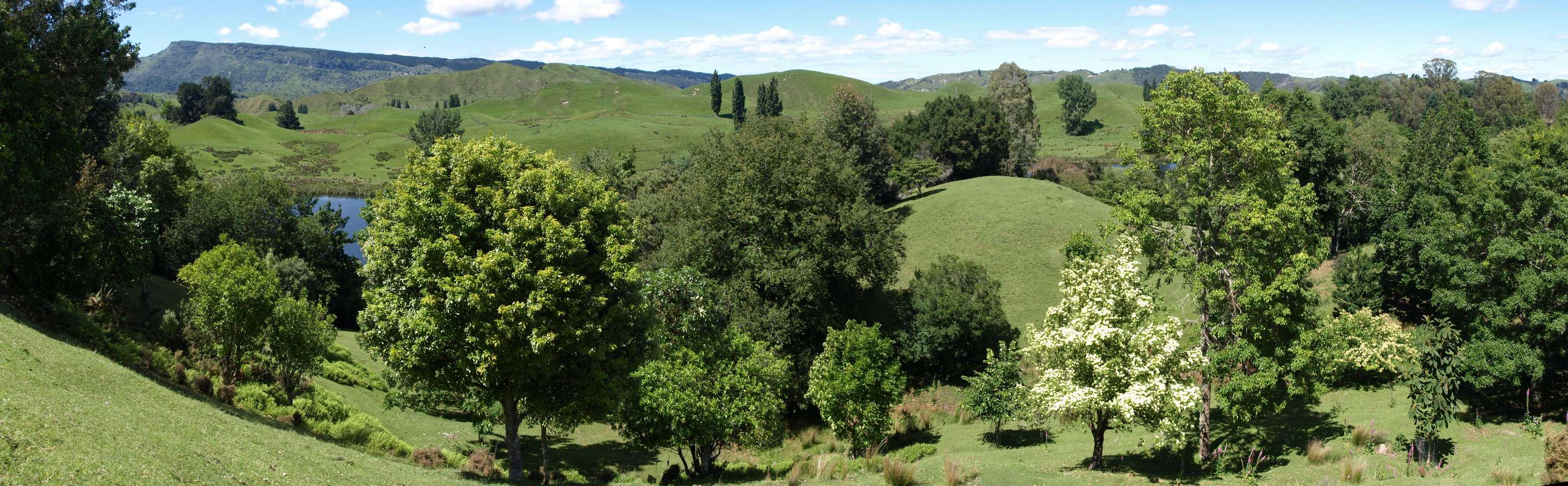
View from "the Ridge" to the south. In the background: Mount Whakapunake

== History ==
Bob Berry was born in 1916 at Tiniroto, and became a farmer, like his grandfather and his father were before. But he developed a special interest in trees. He lived at Hackfalls since 1924, and from the early fifties he took over the running of Hackfalls Station and began collecting trees. Until that time, only trees with a commercial interest were planted. Trees were grown for timber, or as fence posts (mainly Lombardy Poplars), or as fruit trees. From 1954 onward, soon after his father's death Berry began planting trees for their beauty and botanical interest, “starting with ease to grow willows and poplars, then a few oaks which he found did rather well there. Thus began a forty year love affair with the genus Quercus, resulting in his now having the biggest collection in the country, with Bob our leading authority on oaks”. The first trees were planted near the edge of Lake Kaikiore: a [swamp cypress (Taxodium distichum), some of the common alders (Alnus), and weeping willows (Salix babylonica var. matsudana).

Poplars were among the trees allowed when Berry's father was still alive, and he continued to extend his collection of poplar species. But he soon took a special interest in oaks. He collected acorns from commercial seed suppliers in 1961 and 1962 and from the Melbourne Botanic Gardens in 1966. He also imported plants from Hillier's in 1964 and 1968 and bought plants from various other nurseries.

In 1975 he received a plant of Quercus rugosa, a Mexican oak. And when the International Dendrology Society (IDS) made a tour of Central and Southwest Mexico in 1982, he participated and collected seed which he brought back and sowed. He made several return trips to Mexico and has today “the largest collection of Mexican oaks probably in the world (outside of Mexico)”.

Other notable introductions to New Zealand that can be credited to Berry's wild collections from Mexico are Dahlia tenuicaulis, a tree dahlia, Clethra mexicana, Alnus acuminata ssp. arguta, Buddleja cordata and B. americana.

In 1993 the arboretum was protected by a trust.

Berry continued planting until 2007. Hackfalls Arboretum now hosts several important collections and a number of beautiful mature specimens.

== Main features of the collection ==
- Acer - about 160 specimen
- Alnus - about 80
- Betula - about 90
- Camellia - about 80
- Eucalyptus - about 90
- Hebe - about 50
- Ilex - about 60
- Magnolia - about 70
- Malus - about 50
- Populus - about 220
- Prunus - about 80
- Quercus - about 450
- Rhododendron - about 400
- Salix - about 70
- Sorbus - about 70

The most important part of the collection are the oaks (Quercus), especially Mexican oaks. Hackfalls has probably the biggest collection of Mexican oaks in cultivation anywhere. A large number of these oaks were collected as acorns by Bob Berry himself on trips to Mexico.

== Bob Berry and Eastwoodhill ==
Contact between Bob Berry and William Douglas Cook dating back to 1953 played an important role in the arboretum's development. Cook was the founder of Eastwoodhill Arboretum (Ngatapa, Gisborne) and offered advice and suggestions for Hackfalls. In turn, Berry started preparing the first catalogue of Eastwoodhill after Cook's death. Berry bought a typewriter to produce it, and the catalogue was published in 1972, containing almost 3000 taxa. Updating the catalogue remained Berry's task until 1986.

== Catalogues of Hackfalls Arboretum ==
Berry made his first handwritten list of trees and shrubs at the arboretum in 1963. That year he also wrote the first catalogue of Eastwoodhill, and published the first typewritten “list of trees and shrubs” of Abbotsford Station, as Hackfalls was still called in those days. Those catalogues were the first of many publications he made, until the publication of the Plant list of Hackfalls Arboretum in 2007, covering 158 pages in Excel.

For a complete list of catalogues of Hackfalls Arboretum, see: Bob Berry (dendrologist)#Catalogues Hackfalls Arboretum.

== Lady Anne ==
1990 Berry married Lady Anne Palmer, who had a reputation as a gardener in England. She founded Rosemoor Garden and donated it to the Royal Horticultural Society when she followed Berry to New Zealand. Her influence on the homestead garden of Hackfalls has been considerable. She created a garden with well grown specimens of many interesting shrubs and plants, cultivars as well as (endemic) species, including Muehlenbeckia astonii.

Anne encouraged the family to form the Hackfalls Arboretum Charitable Trust, to attract grants so the arboretum's maintenance can be continued.

In July 2006, Lady Anne and Berry moved to the town of Gisborne. Since then, Diane Playle has cared for the arboretum, assisted by a small group of volunteers.

== Awards ==
- In 2002 The International Dendrology Society (IDS) cited Hackfalls Arboretum as "a collection of outstanding merit", with a bronze plaque set in rock. The IDS visited the arboretum in 1977, 1990 and 2009.

== Literature ==
- Berry, R. J. (2007) - Hackfalls Arboretum (and Station); Plant List (List of Trees, Shrubs, Climbers and Ferns). Tiniroto
- Clapperton, Garry (1995) – 'From little acorns.... do mighty oak trees grow! - Bob Berry, Tiniroto, Hackfalls, Poplars & Oaks, Mexico, a scientific application'. In: International Dendrology Society, New Zealand Newsletter no. 23, July 1995, p. 14 - 16
- Friar, Jillian and Denis (1996) - New Zealand Gardens Open to Visit. Publ. by Hodder Moa Beckett Publishers Ltd, Auckland New Zealand. ISBN 1-86958-343-4
- Mortimer, John – 'Hackfall's Mighty Oaks' in: in: New Zealand Growing Today, Kumeu, New Zealand, ISSN 1171-7033.Vol. 11, nr. 3. March 1997, p. 60 - 65
- Wilkie, Martin (2008) – 'Bob and Lady Anne Berry, and Hackfalls Arboretum: a shared vision and a grand adventure'. In: The Gardener's Journal, Christchurch New Zealand, ISSN 1178-5020, issue 1, February 2008, p. 13 – 22
