= Bill Crooks =

William Crooks (12 April 1908 – December 1986) was manager of Eastwoodhill Arboretum, Ngatapa, Gisborne, New Zealand from 1967 to 1974. For the previous forty years he was the assistant of William Douglas Cook, founder of the arboretum.

== England ==
Bill Crooks was born in Mutford, Lowestoft, Suffolk, England as the son of James and Jane Elizabeth Crooks (née Hale). He had six brothers and sisters. His father was a fisherman on a smack. During World War I his father was appointed to the Trawling Reserve of Britain's seagoing defences. He won a Distinguished Service Medal for sinking a German submarine by ramming it with his ship and his name was honoured in Lowestoft as "one of the bravest fishermen of the fleet". He died shortly after the war, on 27 December 1919 from pneumonia, that was aggravated by wartime injuries.

== Flock House ==
In New Zealand, Edward Newman, Member of Parliament, encouraged the establishment of the "New Zealand Sheep Owners Acknowledgement of Debt to British Seamen Fund", to support relatives of British seamen who died during the war. The Crooks family was among the dependants of the Fund. The Fund bought Flock House, with the intention to bring sons of seamen to New Zealand, offer them the opportunity to learn farming skills, and place them on farms around New Zealand. Bill Crooks, then 16 years old, was among the first to apply. With his 15-year-old sister Gertrude, he sailed aboard the SS Remuera to New Zealand. Their mother's parting instruction to Bill was "Look after your sister!". They disembarked on 22 May 1924. Gertie headed into domestic service, Bill to Flock House, "and that was the last they saw of each other for about the next thirty years".

After a year at Flock House, Bill found a job at a station at Tahunga, in the headwaters of the Hangaroa River, west of Gisborne. He worked there for a year. "It is also understood by his family that he spent some time working at Whakapunake Station, near Tiniroto.

== Eastwoodhill ==
In 1927 Bill Crooks came to Eastwoodhill, and he would stay there for most of his life. He would serve for 47 years. 38 years he worked for William Douglas Cook, and nine years for H.B. (Bill) Williams.

In the 1920s Eastwoodhill was still a farm. It covered just over 1,200 acres (4.9 km^{2}). Bill came to live in a small room in the workshop cum was-house on the back lawn of the homestead. "When the dilapidated structure was demolished in 1992, the linoleum floor coverings were lifted in Bill's old room to reveal copies of The Poverty Bay Herald newspapers from 1912″.

== Douglas Cook ==
Over the years he served as a farmhand, but also as an assistant plantsman, chauffeur, drinking companion and, above all, as the right-hand man of Douglas Cook. Douglas Cook was blinded in the right eye in World War I and could not drive a car. So he was dependent on Bill Crooks for driving the car they shared between them.

Douglas Cook was not an easy employer at all. He was not a patient man and was known to his neighbours and friends for his outbursts of ill temper. Apart from that there were always financial problems, with Cook exceeding his budget buying trees.

William Douglas Cook "employed a series of farm managers who came and went, labour relations not being his strong point. There was an explosive relationship between him and his assistant Bill Crooks. They had the most frightful rows, but unlike Cook's own family, Bill Crooks stayed for nearly 50 years".

== Marriage and children ==
Bill Crooks married Josephine Inez Richardson (Gisborne, 17 December 1910) who was the youngest daughter of a pioneer farmer at Wharekopae, not far from Ngatapa. Her father was Eric U'Ren Richardson and her mother Florence Adelaide Richardson (née Davies).

Douglas Cook organised Christmas and Guy Fawkes parties at Eastwoodhill, to which the locals were invited. Bill and Jo met here. They married in March 1940 at the Cook Street Anglican Church in Gisborne. When Crooks had plucked up enough courage to tell his employer about his marriage, Douglas Cook was furious at first, but after a while he wrote to Jo and said "he would welcome her to Eastwoodhill, that Bill was like a son to him. The flowery words were probably the only ones of such a kind promising nature that Jo received from Douglas Cook and did not portend the nature of the life she was about to lead".

Bill and Jo had four sons and a daughter. They lived in a small, two-bedroom cottage at "Pear Park", with little comfort. A poor water supply, never more than an outside toilet, and no laundry facilities, apart from a copper.

"The wages paid to Bill were meagre and did not go anywhere to meet the needs of the family. Jo's two sisters Phyll and Helen used to pay for the children's clothes. Over the years Bill was promised much by Douglas Cook, a home for Bill was supposed to have been built opposite McLean's, in amongst the trees that had been planted there. Later Douglas Cook said that he was going to buy the hills that are now Eivers' and Sherratt's as a farm for Bill. None of this eventuated. Douglas Cook had money to spend on furniture, antiques, trees, rugs, crystal, silver, paintings, books etc. but Bill had to wait. On Douglas Cook's death he received the contents of the house. That though was hardly compensation to either Bill or to Jo and the children for the years of frugal living".

== Establishing an arboretum ==
The impact of Bill Crook's arrival on the development of Eastwoodhill can hardly be overestimated. While Bill attended to much of the farm work, Douglas Cook had more time for such things as planning the arboretum, writing out orders to nurseries, and labeling. Bill assisted with planting as well.

Immediately after his arrival in 1927 the first plantings of "Corner Park" were made. From 1934 "Cabin Park" was planted, and at the end of World War II "Douglas Park" was included in the plantings.

In 1952, at age 71, Douglas Cook sold 925 acres (3.74 km^{2}) of his property. The money was used for making ponds throughout the arboretum and for the development of "Pear Park", "The Circus", "Orchard Hill" and "Glen Douglas".

== H. B. (Bill) Williams ==
In the 1960s, when Douglas Cook was aging and desperately seeking ways to secure the future of Eastwoodhill, Bill Crooks still worked for him. He first tried to offer the arboretum to the Royal New Zealand Institute of Horticulture. But after long negotiations, this did not become a reality. One of the other things Douglas Cook considered was selling to Bill Crooks, knowing the difficulties implied in this solution. Finally, in 1965, H. B. (Bill) Williams bought Eastwoodhill to preserve it for the future. With the money, Douglas Cook wanted to upgrade and paint his house and Bill Crooks', and put in an "inside lav" for Bill.

But soon after selling Eastwoodhill, William Douglas Cook had two heart attacks. Arrangements were made for the Crooks to move into his home so that they could be constantly on hand. In 1966 his health got worse. He spent some time in a hospital. Bill and Jo Crooks paid him almost constant attention. Douglas later wrote that his doctor wanted him to engage someone to look after him "but I said NO. Bill will look after me. HE and his wife do all I need... Bill is like a most attentive son to me.".

Douglas Cook died in 1967 in Gisborne, New Zealand. Crooks would remain the manager of the arboretum until 1974. He helped Bob Berry create the first catalogue of Eastwoodhill in the early 1970s.

== Literature ==
- An. (2007) – Eastwoodhill, the colours of an arboretum. Publ. by Eastwoodhill Inc., Ngatapa, Gisborne. ISBN 978-0-473-12471-7. This book contains a collection of photographs by Gisborne Camera Club Inc. Design and Production by Gray Clapham. Photographic co-ordination: Stephen Jones. Introductory essay: Sheridan Gundry. Botanical descriptions: Paul Wynen.
- Berry, John (1997) – A Man's Tall Dream; the story of Eastwoodhill, Gisborne, NZ. ISBN 0-473-04561-3
- Clapperton, Garry (1996) – 'Forty seven years of faithful service – The story of Bill Crooks, Douglas Cook's right-hand man at Eastwoodhill'. In: International Dendrology Society, New Zealand Newsletter no. 24, February 1996, p. 17 - 21
- Mortimer, John (1997) – 'A Magnificent Obsession' in: New Zealand Growing Today, Kumeu, New Zealand, ISSN 1171-7033. April 1997, p. 45 – 51
