= Pukeiti (gardens) =

Garden and plant collection in New Zealand

- Location within New Zealand
- Location: Taranaki, New Zealand
- Nearest city: New Plymouth, New Zealand
- Coordinates: 39.2006°S 173.98°E
- Area: 49 acres (20 ha)
- Established: 1951
- Operator: Taranaki Regional Council
- Status: Open all year

Pukeiti is a New Zealand Gardens Trust Five-Star Garden of National Significance in Taranaki, on the western North Island of New Zealand. It is in a gap between two sections of the Egmont National Park, to the northwest of the main cone of Mount Taranaki, on a saddle between it and the small Kaitake Range which stretches towards Ōakura. The garden named for the Pukeiti (literally 'little hill') lava dome which is nearby. It is listed as one of Taranaki's top 10 visitor attractions.

Founded in 1951 by William Douglas Cook (who also founded Eastwoodhill Arboretum, Ngatapa, Gisborne) and Russell Matthews, Pukeiti is now one of the country's top rhododendron gardens, run by the Taranaki Regional Council. Facilities include a visitor centre, cafe and covered walkways. The property covers 360 hectares (890 acres) and includes 26 hectares (64 acres) of garden set within original and regenerating rainforest, with a total of 21 km (13 mi) of walkways.
