= Bob Berry (dendrologist) =

New Zealand dendrologist (1916–2018)

- Born: Robert James Berry; 11 June 1916; Gisborne, New Zealand
- Died: 2 August 2018 (aged 102); Gisborne, New Zealand
- Spouse: Lady Anne Berry (m. 1990)

Robert James Berry (11 June 1916 – 2 August 2018) was a New Zealand dendrologist who founded Hackfalls Arboretum at his farm in Tiniroto, Gisborne. The arboretum is now known for having one of the largest collections of Mexican oaks in the world. During the 1950s and 1960s he was in regular contact with William Douglas Cook, the founder of Eastwoodhill Arboretum, Ngatapa, Gisborne. Berry made the first catalogues of this arboretum, which is now the National Arboretum of New Zealand.

== Biography ==
Berry was born in Gisborne in 1916. His grandfather was originally from Knaresborough, Yorkshire, England, and had settled in the East Coast area of the North Island of New Zealand in 1889. In 1916, the Berry family bought the majority of Abbotsford Station from the Whyte family, the first European settlers in the area of Tiniroto, a small rural settlement, about halfway along the inland road between Gisborne and Wairoa. The original property of the Berry family at Tiniroto, called Hackfalls, was sold. The name lapsed, but was then used again for the new property, in 1984.

As Berry grew older he developed an interest in trees for their beauty and botanical interest. Most farmers, like his father, planted trees mainly for shelter, timber and fencing, and fruit crops. Long shelterbelts of poplars separate the paddocks and the properties at Tiniroto. During the weekends Berry planted and maintained his growing collection of more unusual trees. Most of the trees were planted around Lake Kaikiore and in the pasture between Lake Kaikiore and Lake Karangata. Berry took over management of the farm in 1950. From this time on his interest and enthusiasm for what had been a hobby reached a new level.

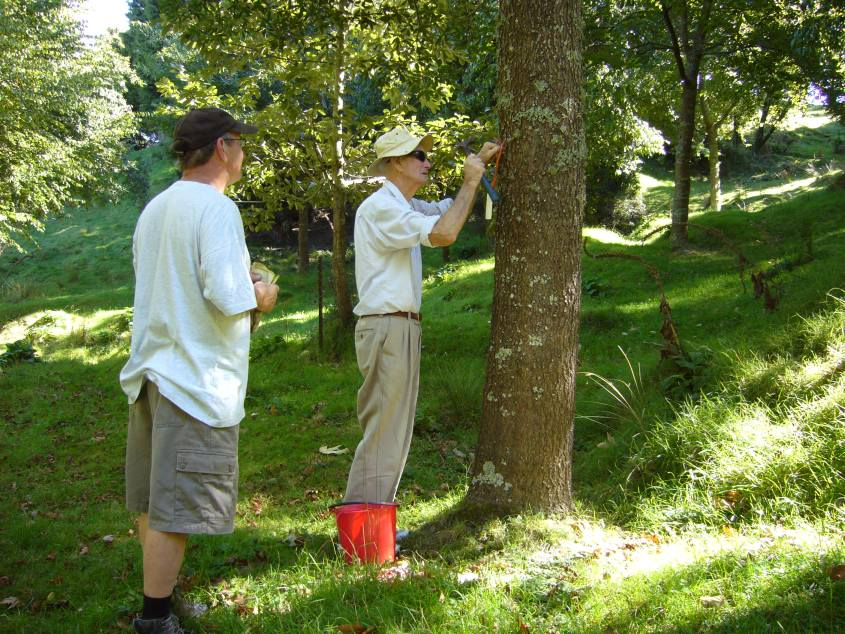
Bob Berry attaching a label at a tree at Hackfalls Arboretum (2007)

Berry's interest in trees was strongly influenced by William Douglas Cook, the founder of Eastwoodhill Arboretum. In 1953, as a member of the Royal New Zealand Institute of Horticulture, Berry took part in a trip to Eastwoodhill Arboretum. He became a frequent visitor of Eastwoodhill and Douglas Cook offered advice and support to Berry concerning the arboretum at Abbotsford Station.

After Douglas Cook's death, in 1971, Berry started the immense job of making a catalogue of all the trees of Eastwoodhill, with the help of Bill Crooks. The first catalogue was published in 1972. In the same year, the first list of trees and shrubs of Abbotsford Station was published. Berry continued updating the catalogue of Eastwoodhill until 1986.

In 1977, a group of members of the International Dendrology Society (IDS) visited Abbotsford Arboretum for the first time. Berry joined the IDS, and in October 1982 joined a tour to Mexico, which was the beginning of a particular interest in Central American Oaks (Quercus sp.). This trip was followed by several others to Mexico to collect acorns.

Berry remained in charge of Abbotsford Station until 1984, when his niece, Diane, and her husband Kevin Playle took over the management of the farm. The name of the station changed (back) to Hackfalls Station at that moment, and Berry could spend more time with his trees.

In 1990, Berry welcomed another group of IDS members at Hackfalls Arboretum, led by Lady Anne Palmer. Later the same year Berry married Lady Anne. She played an important role in the development of the homestead garden at Hackfalls Station, being an eminent plantswoman in her own right.

In 1993, the arboretum was protected by a covenant with the Queen Elizabeth II National Trust. It now covers about 50 ha (124 acres) and contains over 3,500 trees and shrubs.

In July 2006, Bob and Anne Berry left the homestead of Hackfalls Station and moved into the town of Gisborne.

Berry turned 100 in June 2016, and he died on 2 August 2018 at the age of 102. Lady Anne Berry died aged 99 in September 2019.

== Hackfalls Arboretum ==
Berry originally planned to make maples the main tree collection of his arboretum. However, he soon discovered that the land was better suited to growing oak trees. There are now about 90 different maples, mostly species, but also some hybrids and cultivars. There are 45 species of Mexican oaks, plus several forms and hybrids. Together with specimens from other regions the oaks have reached a total of about 150 different taxa.

== Eastwoodhill Arboretum ==
Berry met Douglas Cook, the creator of Eastwoodhill Arboretum, in 1953. After Cook's death, Berry helped with identifying and labelling. In 1971, increasingly concerned at the lack of a proper catalogue, he began the huge task of locating and identifying every plant and plotting them on a grid laid over an aerial map. With (Bill) Crooks as his right-hand man, Berry produced a catalogue of some 3000 plant species and varieties and with it the proof that Eastwoodhill was worth preserving".

== Bibliography ==
=== Catalogues Eastwoodhill Arboretum ===
Catalogues produced on typewriter:

- Berry, R. J. – Eastwoodhill Arboretum, Ngatapa; List of Trees and Shrubs. Tiniroto, Febr. 1972. (3-ring folder) ii+77 pgs. (cyclostyled) + (grid-)map 33 x 21,5
- id. 1976
- Berry, R.J. – Eastwoodhill Arboretum. Tree and Shrub List. 1978. 39 pgs.
- Berry, R. J. – Eastwoodhill Arboretum, Ngatapa; List of Trees and Shrubs. Tiniroto, Febr. 1980. ii + 41 pags. + (grid-)map
- Berry, R. J. – Eastwoodhill Arboretum; Catalogue of Trees, Shrubs and Climbers. Tiniroto, March 1982. v + 38 pags. + (grid-)map (A4)

=== Catalogues Hackfalls Arboretum ===
The first list of trees and shrubs was hand written in 1963. The last such catalogue was completed in 1970 and included hand drawn grid maps.

There were three catalogues produced on typewriter:

- Berry, R. J. – Abbotsford Station, Tiniroto (Property of Berry and Berry); List of Trees and Shrubs. Tiniroto, Aug. 1972 (typoscript, multiplicated via carbon copy).
- Berry, R. J. – Catalogue of Trees, Shrubs and Climbers at Kaikiore Arboretum and Hackfalls Station. Tiniroto 1985. Typoscript. iv + 33 pgs. + (grid-)map.
- Berry, R. J. – Hackfalls Arboretum; Catalogue of Trees and Shrubs. Tiniroto, June 1988. iii+39 pgs. + map.

From 1993 onward catalogues were made in a word processor:

- Berry, R. J. – Hackfalls Arboretum and Station; Catalogue of Trees and Shrubs. Tiniroto, January 1993. 48 pgs. + aerial photo with 100x100 m grid.
- Berry, R. J. – Hackfalls Arboretum. Catalogue of Trees, Shurbs and Climbers. Tiniroto, February 1994. 65 pgs.
- id. 1995. 70 pgs. + aerial photo.
- Berry, R. J. – Hackfalls Garden Catalogue. 1999. 34 pgs.

Later, catalogues were produced in Microsoft Excel:

- Berry, R. J. – Hackfalls Arboretum (and Station); Plant List (List of Trees, Shrubs, Climbers and Ferns). Tiniroto, 2007. 158 pgs.
- Berry, R.J. – Hackfalls Arboretum. Trees, Shrubs, Climbers and Ferns. Abbreviated catalogue. Gisborne, 2008. 49 pgs.

In 2008, at the age of 92, Berry started preparations for converting the Excel-catalogue to FilemakerPro (a proper DBMS).

=== Other publications ===
- Berry, R. J. – Oaks in New Zealand. In: Farm Forestry, Wellington 1978, p. 2 – 20.
- Berry, Bob – A few reminiscences of a tree planter. In: The Gardener's Journal, Christchurch NZ, issue 1, February 2008, p. 23/24

== Awards and honours ==
- 1991. Associate of Honour of the Royal NZ Institute of Horticulture.
- 2002. Life membership of the NZ Farm Forestry Association.
- 2005. Life membership of the NZ Farm Forestry Association.
- 2010. Ronald Flook Award. Awarded by the New Zealand Arboricultural Association (NZAA) for Mr. Berry's lifetime achievement working with trees.
- 2015. Veitch Memorial Medal. Awarded by the Royal Horticultural Society to persons of any nationality who have made an outstanding contribution to the advancement of the science and practice of horticulture.

== Literature ==
- An. – Eastwoodhill, the colours of an arboretum. Publ. by Eastwoodhill Inc., Ngatapa, Gisborne 2007. ISBN 978-0-473-12471-7. This book contains a collection of photographs by Gisborne Camera Club Inc. Design and Production by Gray Clapham. Photographic co-ordination: Stephen Jones. Introductory essay: Sheridan Gundry. Botanical descriptions: Paul Wynen.
- Berry, John – A Man's Tall Dream; The Story of Eastwoodhill. Publ. by Eastwoodhill Trust Board, Gisborne 1997. ISBN 0-473-04561-3
- Wilkie, Martin – Bob and Lady Anne Berry, and Hackfalls Arboretum: a shared vision and a grand adventure. In: The Gardener's Journal, Christchurch NZ, ISSN 1178-5020, issue 1, February 2008, p. 13 – 22
