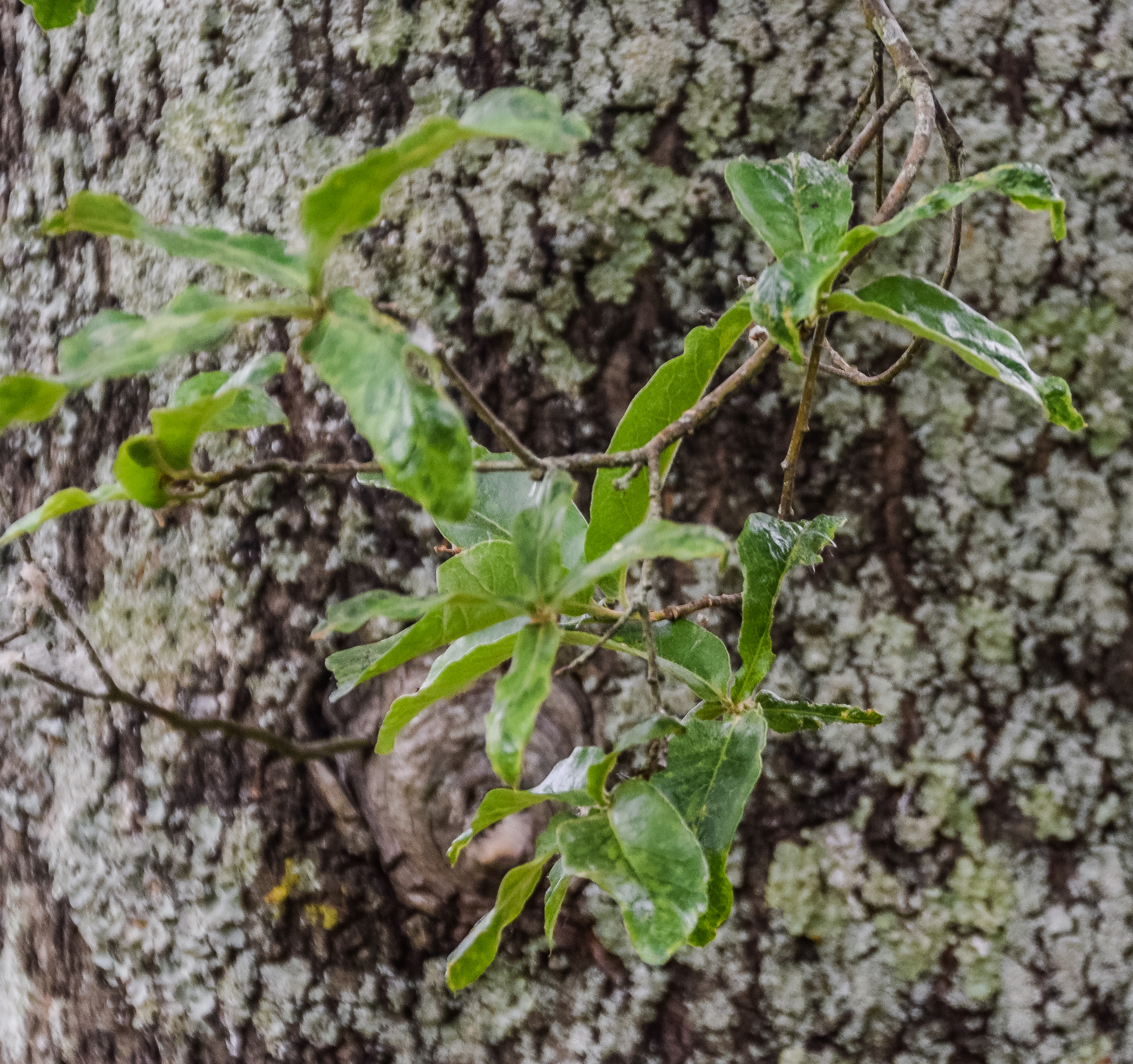
- Quercus crispipilis in Hackfalls Arboretum

Conservation status
- Near Threatened (IUCN 3.1)

Scientific classification
- Kingdom: Plantae
- Clade: Embryophytes
- Clade: Tracheophytes
- Clade: Spermatophytes
- Clade: Angiosperms
- Clade: Eudicots
- Clade: Rosids
- Order: Fagales
- Family: Fagaceae
- Genus: Quercus
- Subgenus: Quercus subg. Quercus
- Section: Quercus sect. Lobatae
- Species: Q. crispipilis

Binomial name
- Quercus crispipilis Trel.

Synonyms
- Quercus aristigera Trel.; Quercus brachystachys f. caerulea Trel.; Quercus brachystachys f. venulosa Trel.; Quercus cerifera Trel.; Quercus chichavacana Trel.; Quercus cinnamomea Trel.; Quercus pannosifolia C.H.Mull.; Quercus skutchii Trel.

= Quercus crispipilis =

Species of oak tree

Quercus crispipilis is a species of oak native to Chiapas state in southern Mexico and to Guatemala.

It is placed in Quercus section Lobatae.

== Description ==
Quercus crispipilis is a medium-sized tree which grows up to 27 meters tall, and trunk of 30 to 60 cm in diameter at maturity.

== Habitat and range ==
Quercus crispipilis is generally found in cloud forests, and also in humid oak forests and oak–pine forests, between from 750 to 2,700 meters elevation. It is found in closed-canopy forests, and regenerates well in forest clearings and abandoned fields.

It is native to the Chiapas Highlands of central Chiapas, the Sierra Madre de Chiapas of Chiapas and Guatemala, and the Guatemalan Highlands of central Guatemala.

== Conservation and threats ==
People of the highland forests of Chiapas and Guatemala have engaged in shifting cultivation for centuries. Q. crispipilis regenerates faster in cleared areas than in mature forests, and naturally resettles cleared areas once they have been abandoned. In more recent times, its highland habitat has been converted to intensive and continued use as pasture and agriculture, leading to habitat loss and fragmentation.

The species is also threatened by climate change. It is estimated that the tree may lose 13.1% to 48.4% of its suitable habitat by 2050, depending on the climate change scenario.
