= Steven Chamuleau =

Dutch cardiologist (born 1969)

Steven Anton Jozef Chamuleau (Amsterdam, October 28, 1969) is a cardiologist and professor at the University Medical Center Utrecht (UMCU) in the Netherlands, specializing in cardiac regenerative therapy, valvular disease and cardiac imaging.

== Biography ==
Before he attended medical school at the University of Amsterdam, Chamuleau started a study Econometrics and received a propaedeutics in Biology. He finished medical school in Amsterdam and subsequently received his PhD degree cum laude in 2001 on intracoronary derived physiological parameters for clinical decision making at the Academic Medical Center (AMC) in Amsterdam under supervision of prof. Jan Piek. After his PhD he started his residency at the AMC, where he also did his fellowship training in cardiology and cardiac imaging. After a year in Louisville in the lab of prof. Bolli, focusing on cardiac stem cell treatment, he became a staff cardiologist at the UMC Utrecht. In 2016 he was appointed a professor position at the UMCU.

== Publications ==
Chamuleau has published over 90 peer-reviewed papers and is an active member in the European Society of Cardiology and American Heart Association. He is a reviewer for many cardiac journals, such as Heart, Journal of Cellular and Molecular Medicine, International Journal of Cardiology and Catheterization and Cardiovascular Interventions. He is on the editorial board of ‘Frontiers in Heart Surgery’. He is a (co-)PI in several large international research consortia and clinical trials, primarily focused on stem cell treatment and valvular disease.
