= William Douglas Cook =

New Zealand writer

William Douglas Cook (New Plymouth, New Zealand, 28 October 1884 – Gisborne, New Zealand, 27 April 1967) was the founder of Eastwoodhill Arboretum, now the national arboretum of New Zealand, and one of the founders of Pukeiti, a rhododendron garden, close to New Plymouth. He was a "plantsman with the soul of a poet and the vision of a philosopher".

== Biography ==
Douglas Cook was the second son of William Cook (Aberdeen, Scotland 1855) and Jessie Miller (Glasgow, Scotland 1853). William arrived in Auckland, New Zealand at 8 September 1879 and started working as an accountant with the Bank of New Zealand. Jessie arrived 19 August 1881. They married three weeks later. The first son John Arthur was born 9 September 1882. The family changed home often. At 28 October 1884 Douglas was born in New Plymouth. A daughter named Sheila Mary Melot was born in Auckland at 25 December 1891.

Douglas had a difficult relationship with his father and left home when he was 17 years old to go working as a "cowboy" in Hawke's Bay region. One year later he bought a peach orchard in the neighbourhood of Hastings. The money he needed he borrowed from his father. He bought the orchard of James Nelson Williams, the grandfather of H. B. (Bill) Williams, who would play such an important role in the history of Eastwoodhill 60 years later. Douglas had bad luck. Two times frost destroyed most of the crops. He had to find another job. In a ballot he acquired a part of the Ngatapa settlement, 620 acres (2.5 km^{2}) large. He called his new property "Eastwoodhill", after the house where his mother grew up near Glasgow.

He would live there for the rest of his life, and create a large arboretum, with more than 2,000 different taxa of trees and shrubs. In the early years after his arrival at Ngatapa, the farm was substantially enlarged. But in later years he sold parts of the property again, to gain money for buying trees. In 1965 Douglas Cook sold Eastwoodhill to H. B. (Bill) Williams, who bought the arboretum with the purpose to preserve it for the future.

During World War I Cook fought in Asia, Africa and Europe as a trooper of the Wellington Mounted Rifles and as a gunner in the N.Z. Field Artillery.

William Douglas Cook married Claire Bourne on 20 October 1930. They adopted a son, named Sholto. The marriage did not succeed and Douglas and Claire separated in 1937.

Cook died in 1967, aged 83, a "plantsman with the soul of a poet and the vision of a philosopher".

== Eastwoodhill ==
When Douglas Cook arrived at his newly bought land in 1910, he started planting immediately. In this first plantings "he followed a utilitarian approach – some mixed eucalyptus and Monterey pine (Pinus radiata) for firewood, and 1-acre (4,000 m^{2}) of mixed orchard including apple, pear and plum trees for household use". He built a small cabin to live in. This was replaced by a larger dwelling in 1914. In that same year he left for voluntary service in World War I. Just before his departure an order of a hundred trees and shrubs and a hundred rhododendrons and azaleas arrived and it was a rush to get these planted.

In the First World War Douglas Cook served in Gallipoli, Egypt and France. In France he lost the sight of his right eye in 1916. He spent some time in England to recuperate. During that time he visited some beautiful gardens, especially the Royal Botanic Gardens at Kew. After returning to New Zealand in 1917 (with a plant of both the red and variegated cabbage tree, that Arthur William Hill of Kew gave him) he started creating his own park. Now that he had learned to admire the beauty of trees, he started planting on a large scale. For instance in 1920 about 2,500 trees and shrubs were ordered for the garden. Bulbs and perennials were ordered too, including tulips, hyacinths, lilies and gladioli.

In the subsequent years plantings continued. The garden was extended. From 1927 onward, when Bill Crooks got engaged, the creation of the "Parks" started:

- In 1927 the first plantings of "Corner Park" were made.
- From 1934 "Cabin Park" was planted.
- At the end of World War II "Douglas Park" was included in the plantings.
- In 1952, Douglas Cook, then being 71 years old, sold 925 acres (3.74 km^{2}) of his property. The money was used for making ponds throughout the arboretum and for the development of "Pear Park", "The Circus", "Orchard Hill" and "Glen Douglas".

At the end of his life, Douglas Cook had established an arboretum of international importance. Since then, new plantings contributed to what now has become the National Arboretum of New Zealand.

== Not an ordinary farmer ==
Douglas Cook wrote, in 1963: "I never was a farmer. That was only a means of living in the country and being my own boss. I never could stand taking orders and loved roaming the hills". He spend most of his money on plants, rather than investing it in his farm. And apart from that he was a nudist, and used to work only in a pair of boots and a sun hat. Bob Berry, who got involved in the development of Eastwoodhill in the 1950s (and still is involved in it up till now) remembers his "puckish sense of humour".

William Douglas Cook might be called "a passionate man, not because of his somewhat mercurial personal relationships, but he certainly showed an undeviating passion for planting trees over a lifetime". His passion really took form after he took possession of the 260 ha property of Eastwoodhill in 1910. "After just six weeks a garden was shaping up, and by the end of the first year he had filled sixteen pages of his notebook with details of plantings".

Cook went back to Britain again in 1922 and 1924, to get new inspiration for his dream of establishing a park of his own.

After the second World War there was another impetus to Douglas Cook for collecting as much different trees as possible at Eastwoodhill. He was afraid that Europe would be destroyed in a new (nuclear) war and saw his plantings as a repository for good garden material.

Mortimer states that there "is a fair amount of information about what he bought (...), but not much about where he put them or what their fate was. He was essentially a collector (and a muddler), buying one of everything he hadn't got".

== Pukeiti ==
Douglas Cook had a passion for rhododendrons, and "rhodos" didn't fare well at Eastwoodhill, in the late 1940s. That brought him back to Taranaki. He knew that rhododendrons flourished in that region. He and Russell Matthews grasped the idea of creating a rhododendron garden at the slopes of Mt. Taranaki. In March 1950 they found a good spot at a good height above sea level, and with enough rainfall throughout the year. Douglas Cook bought the 153 acres (0.62 km^{2}) of land called Pukeiti, and offered the site to the New Zealand Rhododendron Association. Having a lack of finances, this organisation declined his offer. In October 1951 he formed The Pukeiti Rhododendron Trust (by then a group of 24 like-minded people), to which he donated the land. In 1952 a further 163 acres (0.66 km^{2}) was given to the Trust anonymously. Membership of the Trust grew steadily, volunteers worked, donations of money, plants and materials flowed in, and Pukeiti, as the gardens have become known, flourished. The gardens now cover 900 acres (3.6 km^{2}), holding 2,000 different specimen of rhododendrons and membership has reached 3,000.

== Writer ==
William Douglas Cook was a prolific writer of letters. He also published a number of articles in gardening journals and year books etc. In the period 1948–1951 he published quite a few articles on Eastwoodhill in the New Zealand Gardenerand one in The Journal of the Royal Horticultural Society, as well as some articles on different topics. In 1960 and 1964 he published articles on rhododendrons in New Zealand and on Pukeiti in The Rhododendron and Camellia Year Book.

== Honours and awards ==
- 1948: Fellow of the Royal New Zealand Institute of Horticulture (RNZIH).
- 1965: Veitch Memorial Medal from the Royal Horticultural Society (of the U.K.), recognition of his efforts over 45 years for service to horticulture.
- 1966: Associate of Honour of the RNZIH.

== Selected bibliography ==
- 1948a: "Development of 'Eastwoodhill', one of New Zealand's Outstanding Private Gardens". In: New Zealand Gardener, 1 January 1948.
- 1948b: "Trees for the Farm – Why Not Get Away from the Commonplace?" In: New Zealand Gardener, 1 May 1948, pp. 540–542.
- 1948c: "Nyssa sylvatica – For Autumnal Colours". In: New Zealand Gardener, 1 July 1948, p. 743; and "two small trees of N. sylvatica on offer (by WDC), p. 753.
- 1949: "A New Zealand Garden, 'Eastwoodhill', Gisborne, North Island". In: The Journal of the Royal Horticultural Society, Vol. LXXIV, Part 5, May 1949, pp. 183–192 (+ 3 photos)
- 1950a: "The Glories of Autumn – Colour Parade at Eastwoodhill". In: New Zealand Gardener, 1 May 1950, pp. 664–667.
- 1950b: "Eastwoodhill in Autumn – Trees and Shrubs of Real Beauty". In: New Zealand Gardener, 1 July 1950, pp. 848–9.
- 1951a: "A Plantsman's Garden – Unique Horticultural Collection at Lindisfarne". In: New Zealand Gardener, 1 February 1951, pp. 472–4.
- 1951b: "A Plantsman's Garden – The Lindisfarne Collection". In: New Zealand Gardener, 1 March 1951, pp. 526–8.
- 1960: "Rhododendrons in New Zealand". In: Rhododendron and Camellia Year Book 1960, pp. 54–59
- 1963: letter of 1 January 1963. Posthumously published in: Eastwoodhill Information Series no. 2 (1992)
- 1964: "Pukeiti". In: Rhododendron and Camellia Year Book 1964, pp. 21– 26.

== Literature ==
- Jellyman, A, R. Hair, A. Smith and L. Bublitz – A Guide to Pukeiti. Publ. by Pukeiti Rhododendron Trust, New Plymouth 1976 (with articles contributed by A. Jellyman, R. Hair, A. Smith and L. Bublitz).
- An. – Eastwoodhill, the colours of an arboretum. Publ. by Eastwoodhill Inc., Ngatapa, Gisborne 2007. ISBN 978-0-473-12471-7. This book contains a collection of photographs by Gisborne Camera Club Inc. Design and Production by Gray Clapham. Photographic co-ordination: Stephen Jones. Introductory essay: Sheridan Gundry. Botanical descriptions: Paul Wynen.
- Berry, John – A Man's Tall Dream; The Story of Eastwoodhill. Publ. by Eastwoodhill Trust Board, Gisborne 1997. ISBN 0-473-04561-3
- Clapperton, Gerry – The Story of William Douglas Cook. Publ. as a leaflet "Eastwoodhill Information Series No. 1" by Eastwoodhill Trust Board, Gisborne 1992
- Mortimer, John (1997) – 'A Magnificent Obsession' in: New Zealand Growing Today, Kumeu, New Zealand, ISSN 1171-7033. April 1997, pp. 45–51
- Smith, Graham – Pukeiti, the Rainforest Garden (with photographs by Jane Dove Juneau). South Pacific Light Press, Oakura 2007. ISBN 0-473-12594-3
