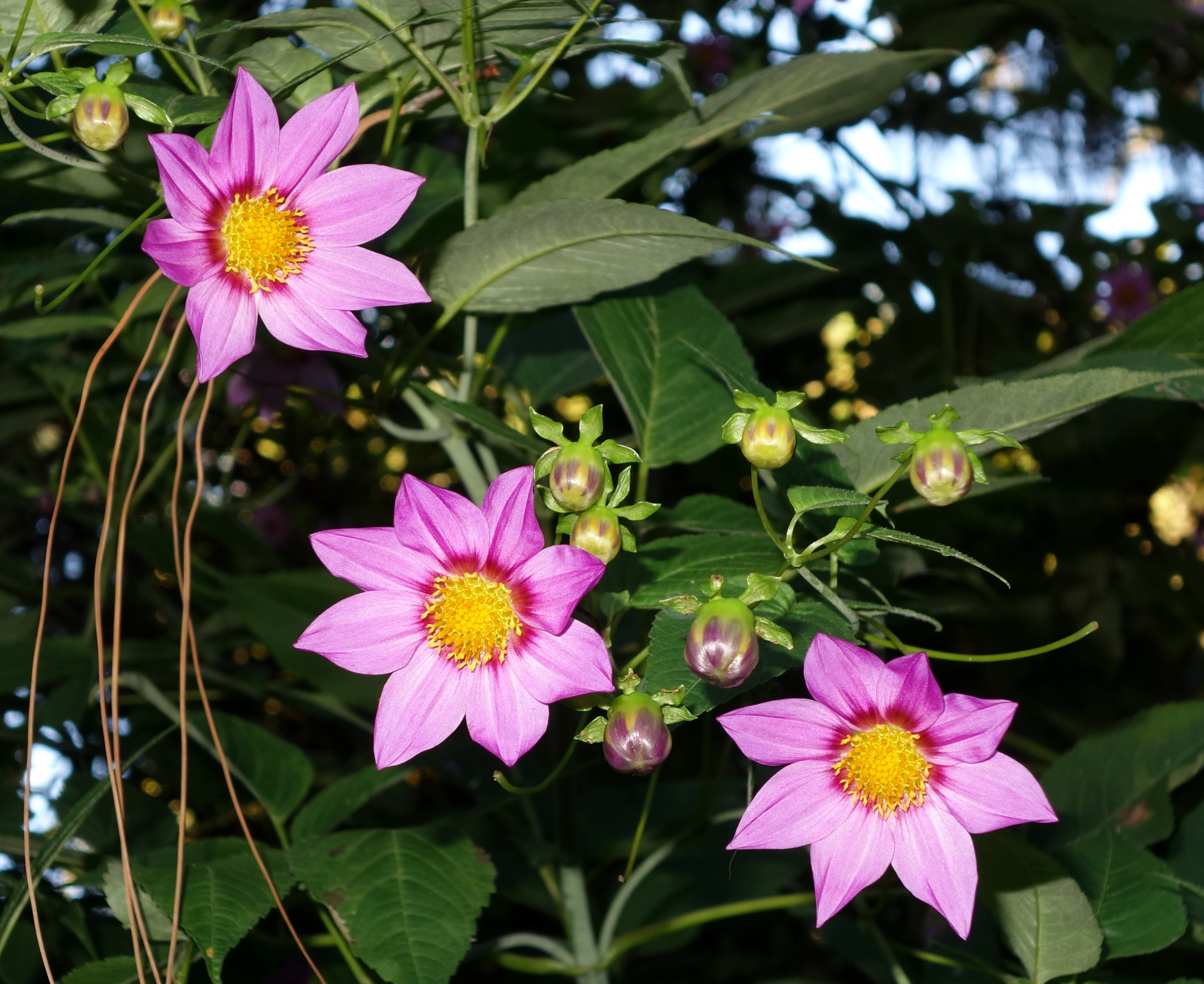
- Flowers
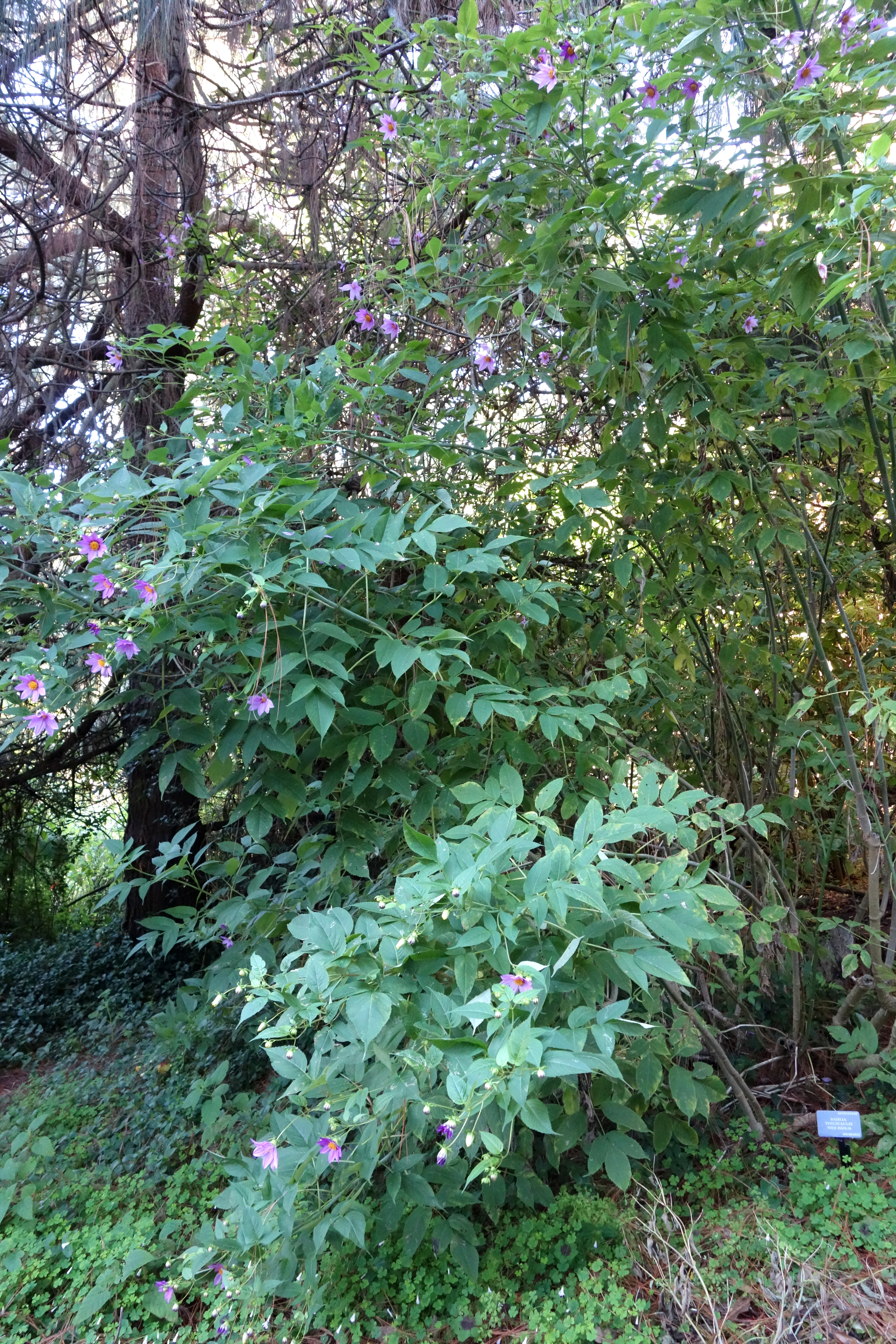
- At the San Francisco Botanical Garden

Scientific classification
- Kingdom: Plantae
- Clade: Tracheophytes
- Clade: Angiosperms
- Clade: Eudicots
- Clade: Asterids
- Order: Asterales
- Family: Asteraceae
- Genus: Dahlia
- Species: D. tenuicaulis

Binomial name
- Dahlia tenuicaulis P.D.Sørensen

= Dahlia tenuicaulis =

Species of plant

Dahlia tenuicaulis is a species of flowering plant in the family Asteraceae. A so-called "tree dahlia", its flowers are 8 centimetres (3 inches) wide. Native to the mountains of southern Mexico, it is occasionally available from commercial suppliers.
