= Journal of Cellular and Molecular Medicine =

- Discipline: Translational medicine
- Language: English
- Edited by: Stefan N. Constantinescu

Publication details
- History: 1997–present
- Publisher: Wiley-Blackwell (United States)
- Frequency: Bi-monthly
- Open access: No
- Impact factor: 5.310 (2020)

Standard abbreviations
- ISO 4: J. Cell. Mol. Med.

Indexing
- ISSN: 1582-1838 (print); 1582-4934 (web)
- OCLC no.: 231925226

Links
- Journal homepage

Journal of Cellular and Molecular Medicine (abbreviated J Cell Mol Med or JCMM) is a bi-monthly, peer-reviewed, scientific journal published by Wiley-Blackwell in association with the Foundation for Cellular and Molecular Medicine. The journal focuses on translational medicine, spanning disease-oriented basic research in molecular and cellular biology and pre-clinical investigations into molecular and cellular therapeutics. JCMM publishes both reviews and original research.

JCMM′s 2020 impact factor is 5.310, placing it 31st among the 136 journals tracked in Clarivate Analytics' category "Medicine, Research & Experimental."

JCMM was previously known as Journal of Medicine and Biochemistry.
