= Isabelle Eriksson =

Swedish athletics competitor

Personal information
- Nationality: Swedish
- Born: 28 October 1986 (age 39)

Sport
- Sport: Track and field
- Events: 400 m hurdles; 400 m; 4×400 m relay
- Team: IFK Lidingö

Achievements and titles
- Personal bests: 400 m hurdles: 1.00.32 (2011); 400 m: 56.11 (2016); Indoor 400 m: 57.54 (2009); 200 m: 25.40 (2011); Indoor 200 m: 25.28 (2012); 100 m: 12.60 (2012)
Medal record
Women's track and field
Swedish Athletics Championships
Gold medal – first place	2011	400 m hurdles
Gold medal – first place	2013	4 × 800 metres relay
Silver medal – second place	2014	4 × 800 metres relay
Silver medal – second place	2015	4 × 800 metres relay
Swedish Indoor Athletics Championships
Bronze medal – third place	2015	4 × 200 metres relay

Isabelle Eriksson (born 28 October 1986) is a Swedish athlete and host.

She has competed as a hurdler for IFK Lidingö and won the gold medal at the Swedish Athletics Championships in the 400 meter hurdles in 2011 as well as relay in 2013.

Eriksson has been involved in the political party Citizens' Coalition and later became host and reporter for the Sweden Democrats' media channel Riks in 2020.
