= Tiniroto =

Locality in the Gisborne District of New Zealand

- Locality
- Interactive map of Tiniroto
- Coordinates: 38.774°S 177.566°E
- Country: New Zealand
- Territorial authority: Gisborne District
- Ward: Tairāwhiti General Ward
- Electorates: Napier; Ikaroa-Rāwhiti (Māori)

Government
  - Territorial authority: Gisborne District Council
  - Mayor of Gisborne: Rehette Stoltz
  - Napier MP: Katie Nimon
  - Ikaroa-Rāwhiti MP: Cushla Tangaere-Manuel

Area
  - Total: 253.88 km^{2} (98.02 sq mi)

Population (2023 census)
  - Total: 180
- Postcode(s): 4078

Tiniroto is a small farming and forestry community on the “inland” road from Gisborne to Wairoa in the eastern part of the North Island of New Zealand.

The village of Tiniroto is small. It has a primary school and a tavern, with overnight accommodation. The tavern is adjacent to a post office.

A few kilometres from Tiniroto Bob Berry founded Hackfalls Arboretum, a 50 hectare area with about 4000 trees.

== Demographics ==
Tiniroto and surrounds cover 253.88 km^{2} (98.02 sq mi). Tiniroto is part of the larger Hangaroa statistical area.

Historical population for Tiniroto and surrounds
Year	Pop.	±% p.a.
2006	186	—
2013	168	−1.44%
2018	171	+0.35%
2023	180	+1.03%

Tiniroto had a population of 180 in the 2023 New Zealand census, an increase of 9 people (5.3%) since the 2018 census, and an increase of 12 people (7.1%) since the 2013 census. There were 93 males and 87 females in 54 dwellings. The median age was 30.7 years (compared with 38.1 years nationally). There were 57 people (31.7%) aged under 15 years, 33 (18.3%) aged 15 to 29, 81 (45.0%) aged 30 to 64, and 9 (5.0%) aged 65 or older.

People could identify as more than one ethnicity. The results were 80.0% European (Pākehā), 35.0% Māori, 3.3% Pasifika, 1.7% Asian, and 3.3% other, which includes people giving their ethnicity as "New Zealander". English was spoken by 98.3%, Māori by 6.7%, and other languages by 1.7%. No language could be spoken by 3.3% (e.g. too young to talk). The percentage of people born overseas was 5.0, compared with 28.8% nationally.

The only religious affiliation given was 8.3% Christian. People who answered that they had no religion were 76.7%, and 13.3% of people did not answer the census question.

Of those at least 15 years old, 21 (17.1%) people had a bachelor's or higher degree, 75 (61.0%) had a post-high school certificate or diploma, and 27 (22.0%) people exclusively held high school qualifications. The median income was $36,700, compared with $41,500 nationally. 6 people (4.9%) earned over $100,000 compared to 12.1% nationally. The employment status of those at least 15 was 66 (53.7%) full-time, 24 (19.5%) part-time, and 6 (4.9%) unemployed.

=== Hangaroa statistical area ===
Hangaroa statistical area covers 1,870.12 km^{2} (722.06 sq mi) and had an estimated population of 1,660 as of June 2025, with a population density of 0.89 people per km^{2}.

Historical population for Hangaroa
Year	Pop.	±% p.a.
2006	1,539	—
2013	1,458	−0.77%
2018	1,539	+1.09%
2023	1,632	+1.18%

Hangaroa had a population of 1,632 in the 2023 New Zealand census, an increase of 93 people (6.0%) since the 2018 census, and an increase of 174 people (11.9%) since the 2013 census. There were 858 males, 771 females, and 3 people of other genders in 525 dwellings. 1.7% of people identified as LGBTIQ+. The median age was 36.3 years (compared with 38.1 years nationally). There were 399 people (24.4%) aged under 15 years, 297 (18.2%) aged 15 to 29, 738 (45.2%) aged 30 to 64, and 195 (11.9%) aged 65 or older.

People could identify as more than one ethnicity. The results were 70.0% European (Pākehā); 44.1% Māori; 2.8% Pasifika; 0.7% Asian; 0.2% Middle Eastern, Latin American and African New Zealanders (MELAA); and 2.6% other, which includes people giving their ethnicity as "New Zealander". English was spoken by 97.2%, Māori by 11.9%, Samoan by 0.2%, and other languages by 2.9%. No language could be spoken by 2.6% (e.g. too young to talk). New Zealand Sign Language was known by 0.4%. The percentage of people born overseas was 7.9, compared with 28.8% nationally.

Religious affiliations were 27.8% Christian, 0.2% Islam, 3.9% Māori religious beliefs, 0.6% Buddhist, and 0.2% other religions. People who answered that they had no religion were 59.9%, and 8.3% of people did not answer the census question.

Of those at least 15 years old, 210 (17.0%) people had a bachelor's or higher degree, 750 (60.8%) had a post-high school certificate or diploma, and 276 (22.4%) people exclusively held high school qualifications. The median income was $43,100, compared with $41,500 nationally. 96 people (7.8%) earned over $100,000 compared to 12.1% nationally. The employment status of those at least 15 was 702 (56.9%) full-time, 219 (17.8%) part-time, and 36 (2.9%) unemployed.

== Geography ==
Tiniroto is situated 61 km from Gisborne and 44 km from Wairoa on the inland road, also called Tiniroto Road. A larger road from Gisborne to Wairoa (SH2) runs more closely to the coast.

Riding along the Tiniroto Road from Gisborne one first passes the Poverty Bay Flats (or flats?). After a few km the road starts winding up, and at 24 km it passes Gentle Annie Summit. The summit rises to 360 m and gives a panoramic view of Poverty Bay and Gisborne. At 29 km lies the little community of Waerenga-o-kuri. The road bends down to the valley of Hangaroa river. At 53 km an unpaved road leads into Doneraille Park.

From Tiniroto further along the road one passes Mt. Whakapunake (961 m high) north and west. At 70 km lies Te Reinga, near the confluence of Hangaroa River and Ruakituri River. They form Te Reinga Falls. At Frasertown, 8 km from Wairoa, the Tiniroto Road connects to SH38, that comes from Rotorua, Murupara and Lake Waikaremoana.

=== Lakes ===
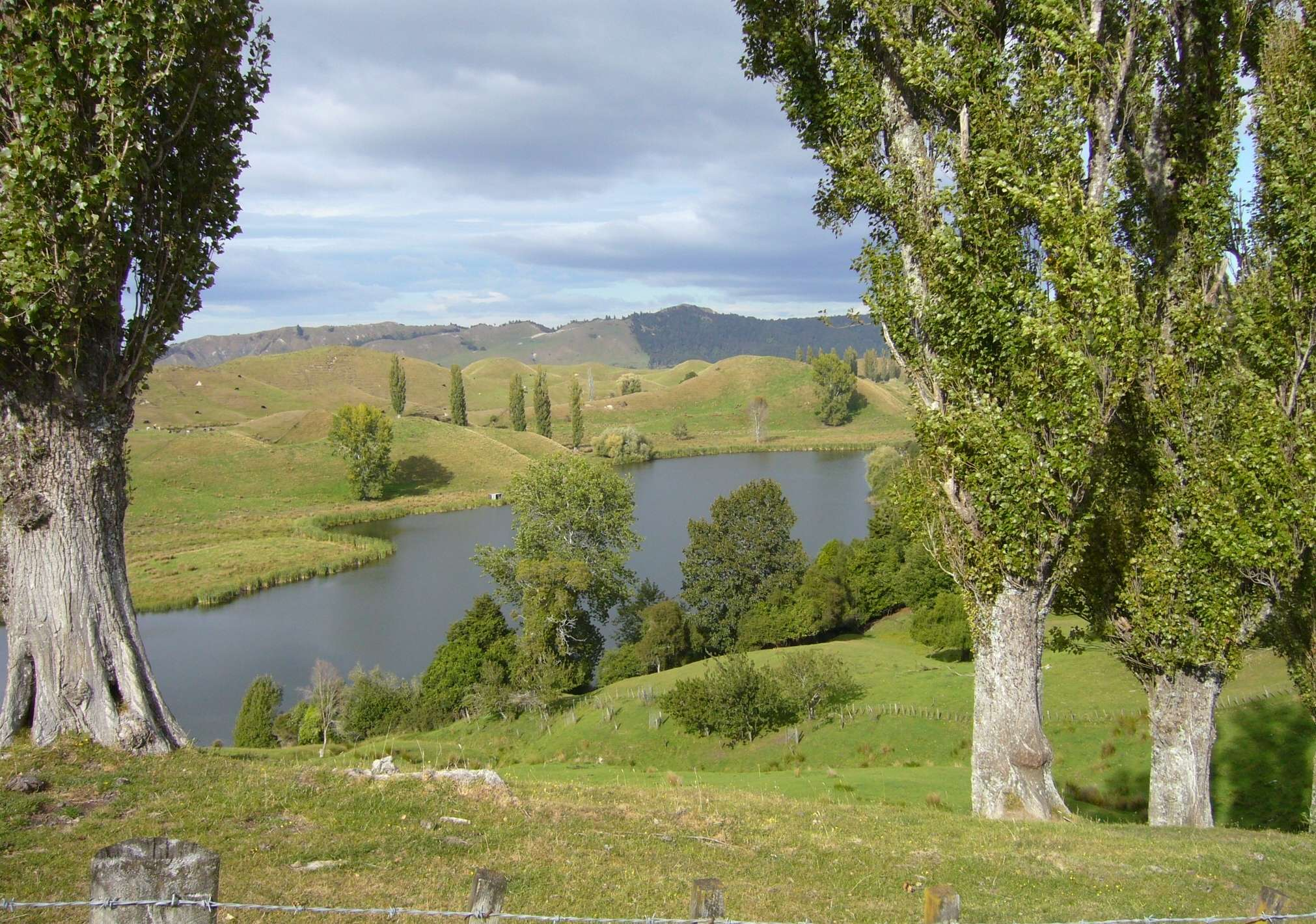
Lake Karangata near Tiniroto

The Māori-language word tiniroto means “many lakes”. There are a number of lakes around Tiniroto that originate from landslides thousands of years ago. The largest lake lies close to the village. At Hackfalls Station one finds Lake Karangata with an area of about 10 ha and Lake Kaikiore with and area of about 5 ha. There are a number of other lakes of different sizes in the surroundings. These lakes offer good fishing opportunities (for trout).

== Education ==
Tiniroto School is a Year 1–8 co-educational state primary school with a roll of 7 as of July 2026. The school opened in 1893.
