= Royal New Zealand Institute of Horticulture =

Horticultural society in New Zealand

The Royal New Zealand Institute of Horticulture (RNZIH) is a horticultural society in New Zealand.

== History ==
According to its website, the RNZIH was founded in 1923. New Zealand's National Library holds minute books from the Institute dating back to 1924.

== Purpose and activities ==
Their mission is to "Encourage and improve horticulture in New Zealand by promoting the understanding, appreciation, conservation and use of plants".

The New Zealand Gardens Trust (NZGT) is an organisation set up in 2004 by the Royal New Zealand Institute of Horticulture. According to its website, the NZGT "promotes the best in New Zealand gardens and horticulture" and runs a system to assess gardens that the public can visit and provide visitors with information on those gardens.

== See also ==
- Gardening in New Zealand
