= Eastwoodhill Arboretum =

National arboretum of New Zealand

Coordinates: 38°33′44″S 177°43′14″E

Eastwoodhill is the national arboretum of New Zealand. It covers 131 hectares (1.31 km^{2}) and is located 35 km northwest of Gisborne, in the hill country of Ngatapa. It was founded in 1910 by William Douglas Cook. Cook's life work would become the creation of a giant collection of Northern Hemisphere temperate climate zone trees in New Zealand – a dream that would eventually cost him all his money – buying and importing thousands of trees from New Zealand and British nurseries.

When his health deteriorated in the 1960s, he sold his property to H. B. (Bill) Williams (1922–2003), who established the Eastwoodhill Trust Board in 1975 as a charitable trust, donating the arboretum to the trust to safeguard it for future generations.

Of all the arboreta of the Southern Hemisphere, Eastwoodhill Arboretum is said to have the largest collection of trees of the temperate climate zone of the Northern Hemisphere. It includes some 4,000 different trees, shrubs and climbers, including 170 species currently on the IUCN world endangered species list.

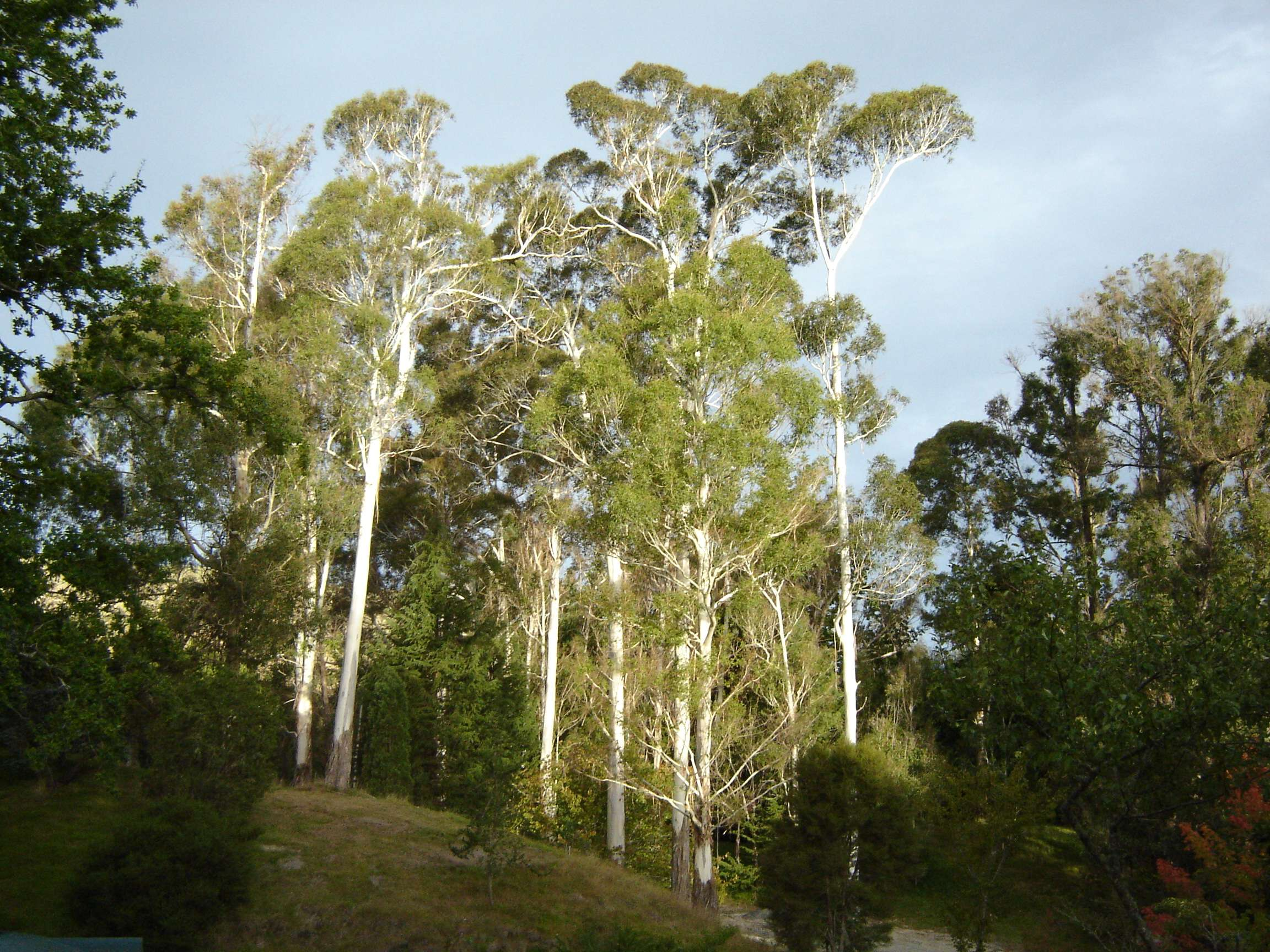
Eucalyptus growing near the entrance of Eastwoodhill Arboretum

== History ==
=== Founding ===
The history of Eastwoodhill Arboretum will remain permanently connected with the life of William Douglas Cook (1884–1967). Originally from New Plymouth, he established a farm of 250 hectares (620 acres) in the Ngatapa settlement, calling the property "Eastwoodhill" after his mother's family home in Thornliebank near Glasgow. The first foundations for the present arboretum were laid as Douglas Cook started creating a garden immediately. He planted trees, but also roses, flowers, shrubs and vegetables.

During the first World War, Cook volunteered to serve in the army. In France, he lost the sight of his right eye and subsequently stayed in Scotland with his family to recover. He was inspired by the gardens and parks of England and also came in contact with Arthur William Hill, who would later become director of Kew Gardens.

In 1918, back at Eastwoodhill, Douglas Cook started planting thousands of Pinus radiata for wood production and for fire-wood. He also planted Eucalyptus viminalis and E. macarthurii. He also started creating parkland with, amongst others, Platanus orientalis, different kinds of Ulmus, Acer pseudoplatanus and A. platanoides. In this year the lombardy poplars were also planted alongside 'Poplar Avenue' up the later Main Entrance Drive. In 1919 he ordered 1,996 trees and shrubs and in 1920 a total of 3,387, of which some two and a half thousand trees and shrubs were intended for the garden. The plantings included 'Cabbage Tree Avenue' (restored in 2006).
Planting was interrupted for journeys to England in 1922 and 1924 but in 1926 the garden was extended with thousands of tulips, hyacinths and peonies from The Netherlands. "Then he got serious," said his biographer and former curator Garry Clapperton in an interview with John Mortimer. He started designing Corner Park, and continued with Cabin Park, the Long Road to Poland, Douglas Park and the cathedral.

=== Extension ===
In 1927, Bill Crooks started working at Eastwoodhill, eventually staying on for 47 years. He did most of the farming, so Cook had more time for his beloved trees. The planting of the 'parks' (parts of which are nowadays the arboretum) started around 1927. Around this time, the collecting of different tree species also began for Cook. Through the years the number of plant specimen collected reached immense proportions, with about 5,000 different taxa at the maximum point, at large costs.

Cook "continued to spend up large on plants in the 1930s, far more than the farm earned. In 1936, he spent £85 (about a working man's wages for half a year) at one New Plymouth nursery alone and, by the end of his life, he had spent on average £1000 annually on plants from overseas and New Zealand".

In the 1920s, Cook could still finance the expansion of his property from his other income and funds, but in his mid-fifties, he had to sell 925 acres (3.74 km^{2}) of his farmland to get further money for planting new trees in the 'Circus' park. At the end of his life, Douglas Cook had effectively invested all his money in his arboretum. In 1965, he had a heart attack. He never fully recovered from that and died 27 April 1967.

=== Trust established ===
Although Eastwoodhill in the 1960s was often praised for its important collection of plants, many people worried about the future of his unique park, especially after Cook got older and started having health problems. In 1965 Heathcote Beetham Williams (referred to as H. B. (Bill) Williams), an entrepreneur from Gisborne, bought the property off Cook with the intention to keep the collection in order, and to guarantee that everyone with interests in plants and trees will be able to visit the arboretum in the future.

== Eastwoodhill Trust ==
In 1975, the "Eastwoodhill Trust Act" passed parliament and the Eastwoodhill Trust Board could be founded. Next, H. B. Williams donated Eastwoodhill to the Board. Williams agreed to the vesting of the property in a Board to be established under a private act, "in the belief that a body so constituted offers the best prospect for the maintenance and development of the arboretum". In 1994, the Act was slightly adapted.

=== Trust Board ===
The Trust Board currently has six members who represent the following institutions:

- Department of Conservation
- Williams Family
- Gisborne District Council
- Poverty Bay Horticultural Society
- East Coast Farm Forestry Association
- Friends of Eastwoodhill

=== Objectives ===
The objectives of the Trust Board are, according to the Act:

- "to maintain and develop Eastwoodhill as an arboretum"
- "so far as it is consistent with its primary function (...) to make Eastwoodhill available to the public for its education and recreation"

=== Management ===
- Until 1974 Bill Crooks was manager of the arboretum.
- From 1974 to 1982 his task was done by Dan Weatherall.
- 1982 Kevin Boyce was nominated curator. He was curator till 1985.
- 1985 – 2001 Gary Clapperton was curator.
- 2001–2009 Paul Wynen, Dipl. Arborist is curator, with Maurice Hall appointed as manager.
- 2010 - 2013 Danny Frazer curator
- 2013 - 2014 Ben Lyte curator
- 2014 - 2019 Dan Haliday curator
- 2019 - 2022 Martin Weaver curator
- 2022 - 2023 Thrive Spaces and Places
- 2023–Present Garrett Blair General Manager

== Friends of Eastwoodhill ==
Shortly after the establishment of the Eastwoodhill Trust, a group of volunteers started to make contributions to the development and maintenance of the arboretum. From 1984, a garden group began caring for the Homestead Garden. In 1985 an organisation was formed to sustain visitors' interest, to build support, to gain donations and to provide information for visitors. The organisation is called the Friends of Eastwoodhill. The 'Friends' publish a newsletter four times a year.

== Buildings ==
The Douglas Cook Centre for Education was opened in 1992 as a venue for seminars. An herbarium was established in 1994. In 1998, an accommodation wing was ready to cater for student groups, botanists and dendrologist and the plant loving public. In 2003, a new visitor centre was opened.

== Layout ==
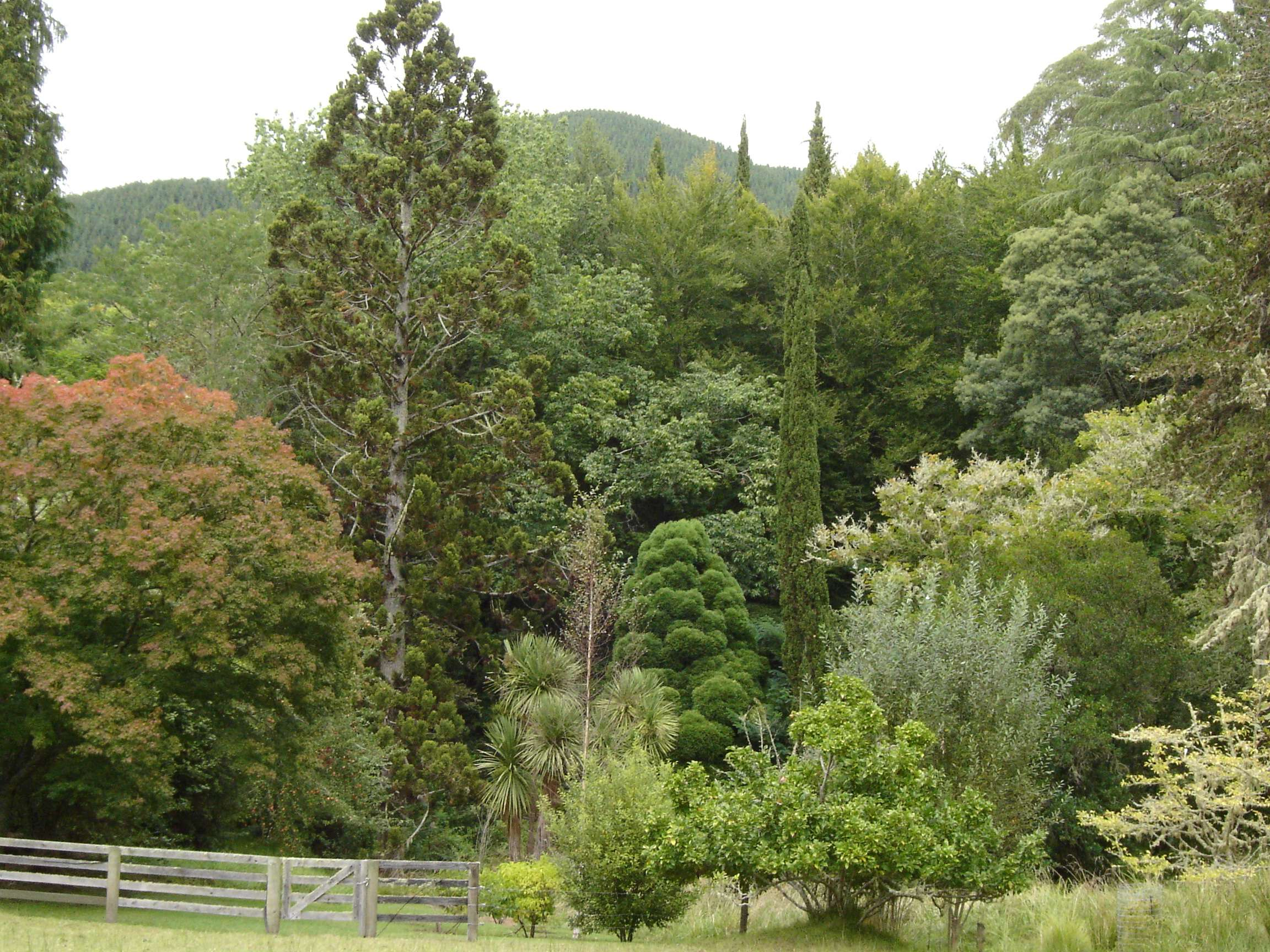
Trees in Eastwoodhill Arboretum

The arboretum is divided into a number of 'parks'. Each of these parks has its own style and name.

The flatter sections are in:

- Corner Park, the first park that was systematically planted by Douglas Cook from 1927 onwards
- Burnside
- Pear Park, planted by Douglas Cook from 1950
- Circus, planted from 1959

Steep hills and valley sections are found in:

- Cabin Park, planted by Douglas Cook from 1934
- Douglas Park, partly planted by Douglas Cook from 1945 (Basinhead and Blackwater from 1961)
- Orchard Hill, planted from 1955
- Glen Douglas, last area that Douglas Cook started in 1963 when he was 79 years old
- Springfield
- Mexico Way
- Canaan
- Turihaua Park
- Three Kings
- Millennial Wood

== Collection ==
Douglas Cook brought a total number of about 5,000 different species and cultivars of trees, shrubs and climbers to Eastwoodhill. A lot of them were imported from well-known English nurseries like Hillier's, Veitch's and Slococks. He also bought many from nurseries in New Zealand like Duncan and Davies in New Plymouth and Harrison's in Palmerston North.

The main focus of the collection is still the trees, shrubs and climbers from the Northern Hemisphere, but nowadays Eastwoodhill has a large collection of native trees, too.

=== First catalogues ===
In the beginning of the 1970s, the first catalogue of trees, shrubs and climbers were prepared by Bob Berry. It contained 3,000 different taxa. After the first version of 1972, the catalogue remained the responsibility of Bob Berry until 1986. Nowadays the catalogue is fully computerised, and the responsibility of the curator.

=== Specialisations ===
The most important genera at Eastwoodhill are:

- Camellia, with about 270 taxa
- Rhododendron, 220 + 250 azaleas
- Acer, 90 taxa
- Quercus, 80 taxa. In the 1990s, large numbers of acorns were collected; three nurseries were supplied with ten thousands acorns of red oak (Quercus rubra) and scarlet oak (Quercus coccinea) a year. Also, pin oaks (Quercus palustris), english oaks (Quercus robur) and mongolian oaks (Quercus mongolica) from Eastwoodhill were sold via commercial nurseries.
- Prunus, 80
- Pinus, with 35 taxa
- Magnolia, 40
- Malus, about 50
- Abies, 30
- Sorbus, 44
- Juniperus, 30

The "most dramatic time to visit Eastwoodhill is in autumn, when over 100 oaks, nearly as many maples, liquidambars, ash (Fraxinus), ginkgo, and other deciduous trees are in their full glory, contrasting with conifers and almost 300 camellias."

=== Homestead garden ===
Close to the entrance of the Arboretum the Homestead Garden is found. It dates from 1910, it covers 1 hectare (0.010 km^{2}), and is maintained by volunteers since 1984. "An ongoing project, the garden provides a fitting introduction to the arboretum and is full of interesting plantings aesthetically combined in a unique setting".

== Awards and merits ==
- In 1977, Eastwoodhill was the first arboretum in the world which was awarded as "a collection of outstanding merit" by the International Dendrology Society, with a bronze plaque set in rock commemorating the award.
- In 2004, the New Zealand Gardens Trust recognised the Arboretum, including the Homestead Garden, as a Garden of National Significance.
- In 2005, Eastwoodhill was officially recognised as the National Arboretum of New Zealand, "a title used alongside the colours of the seasons for promotional fund-raising activities.
- In 2009, Eastwoodhill has won a Gold Award on Ellerslie Flowershow in Christchurch, with the exposition 'Acorn to Oak', designed by Debra Stewart.

== Literature ==
- An. (1975/1994) – Eastwoodhill Trust Act 1975 (including the amendments made in: Eastwoodhill Trust Amendment Act 1994)
- An. (2007) – Eastwoodhill, the colours of an arboretum. Publ. by Eastwoodhill Inc., Ngatapa, Gisborne. ISBN 978-0-473-12471-7. This book contains a collection of photographs by Gisborne Camera Club Inc. Design and Production by Gray Clapham. Photographic co-ordination: Stephen Jones. Introductory essay: Sheridan Gundry. Botanical descriptions: Paul Wynen.
- Berry, John (1997) – A Man's Tall Dream; The Story of Eastwoodhill. Publ. by Eastwoodhill Trust Board, Gisborne. ISBN 0-473-04561-3
- Clapperton, Garry (1992) – The Story of William Douglas Cook. Eastwoodhill Trust Board, Gisborne
- Clapperton, Garry (1998) – 'Hearts of Oak; The Oaks of Eastwoodhill' in: New Zealand Growing Today, Kumeu, New Zealand, ISSN 1171-7033. April 1998, pp. 36–43
- Collier, Gordon (2008) – New Zealand Gardens of Significance – Guidebook. Publ. by The New Zealand Gardens Trust, Warkworth New Zealand. ISBN 978-1-86967-091-7
- Friar, Jillian and Denis (1996) – New Zealand Gardens Open to Visit. Publ. by Hodder Moa Beckett Publishers Ltd, Auckland New Zealand. ISBN 1-86958-343-4
- Mortimer, John (1997) – 'A Magnificent Obsession' in: New Zealand Growing Today, Kumeu, New Zealand, ISSN 1171-7033. April 1997, pp. 45–51
- Wynen, Paul (2003 (?)) – Plant collection strategic plan. Internal document of Eastwoodhill Arboretum. Gisborne

Catalogues of Eastwoodhill Arboretum, made by Bob Berry

- Berry, R. J. (1972) – Eastwoodhill Arboretum, Ngatapa; List of Trees and Shrubs. Tiniroto, Febr. 1972. (3-ring folder) ii+77 pgs. (cyclostyled) + (grid-)map 33 x 21,5
- id. 1976
- Berry, R.J. (1978) – Eastwoodhill Arboretum. Tree and Shrub List. 39 pgs.
- Berry, R. J. (1980) – Eastwoodhill Arboretum, Ngatapa; List of Trees and Shrubs. Tiniroto, Febr. 1980. ii + 41 pags. + (grid-)map
- Berry, R. J. (1982) – Eastwoodhill Arboretum; Catalogue of Trees, Shrubs and Climbers. Tiniroto, March 1982. v + 38 pags. + (grid-)map (A4)
