= Ngātapa =

- Interactive map of Ngātapa
- Coordinates: 38°35′08″S 177°47′23″E
- Country: New Zealand
- District: Gisborne District
- Ward: Tairāwhiti General Ward
- Electorates: Napier; Ikaroa-Rāwhiti (Māori)

Government
  - Territorial authority: Gisborne District Council
  - Napier MP: Katie Nimon
  - Ikaroa-Rāwhiti MP: Cushla Tangaere-Manuel

Area
  - Total: 165.73 km^{2} (63.99 sq mi)

Population (2023 Census)
  - Total: 141
  - Density: 0.851/km^{2} (2.20/sq mi)

Ngātapa is a rural community in the Gisborne District of New Zealand's North Island.

In late 1868 and early 1869 between 86 and 128 followers of Te Kooti were executed on nearby Ngātapa hill after the siege of Ngatapa. The Waitangi Tribunal described the siege as "one of the worst abuses of law and human rights in New Zealand's colonial history". The 150th anniversary was commemorated in Ngatapa in January 2019.

== Demographics ==
Ngātapa locality covers 165.73 km^{2} (63.99 sq mi). It is part of the Hangaroa statistical area.

Historical population
Year	Pop.	±% p.a.
2006	165	—
2013	150	−1.35%
2018	141	−1.23%
2023	141	+0.00%

Ngātapa had a population of 141 in the 2023 New Zealand census, unchanged since the 2018 census, and a decrease of 9 people (−6.0%) since the 2013 census. There were 72 males and 69 females in 57 dwellings. The median age was 38.2 years (compared with 38.1 years nationally). There were 24 people (17.0%) aged under 15 years, 33 (23.4%) aged 15 to 29, 63 (44.7%) aged 30 to 64, and 21 (14.9%) aged 65 or older.

People could identify as more than one ethnicity. The results were 70.2% European (Pākehā), 40.4% Māori, and 4.3% other, which includes people giving their ethnicity as "New Zealander". English was spoken by 93.6%, Māori by 10.6%, and other languages by 2.1%. No language could be spoken by 6.4% (e.g. too young to talk). The percentage of people born overseas was 8.5, compared with 28.8% nationally.

Religious affiliations were 27.7% Christian, 2.1% Māori religious beliefs, 2.1% Buddhist, and 2.1% New Age. People who answered that they had no religion were 59.6%, and 8.5% of people did not answer the census question.

Of those at least 15 years old, 18 (15.4%) people had a bachelor's or higher degree, 78 (66.7%) had a post-high school certificate or diploma, and 15 (12.8%) people exclusively held high school qualifications. The median income was $53,100, compared with $41,500 nationally. 12 people (10.3%) earned over $100,000 compared to 12.1% nationally. The employment status of those at least 15 was 78 (66.7%) full-time, 12 (10.3%) part-time, and 3 (2.6%) unemployed.

== Parks ==
Eastwoodhill Arboretum, the national arboretum of New Zealand, is located in Ngātapa. It includes a walkway and cycleway.

== Marae ==
The Ngātapa Marae is a meeting ground of the Te Aitanga-a-Māhaki hapū of Te Whānau a Kai.

In October 2020, the Government committed $460,500 from the Provincial Growth Fund to upgrade Pakowhai Marae, Takitimu Marae and Ngātapa Marae, creating 13 jobs.

== Transport ==
Ngātapa is the terminus of the former Ngatapa Branch railway that closed in 1931. The locality is served by Wharekopae Road.

== Education ==
Ngatapa School is a Year 1–8 co-educational state primary school with a roll of 12 students as of July 2026. It opened in 1911.

Waerenga-o-Kuri School is a Year 1–8 co-educational state primary school about 23 km south of Ngātapa by road. It had a roll of 33 students as of July 2026. It started in 1917 in a private home, and spent four years from 1920 in a hotel. There was an earlier school at Waerenga-o-Kuri in 1879.
