= Brian Henry (lawyer) =

New Zealand lawyer (born 1950)

Brian Phillip Henry (born 4 September 1950) is a New Zealand barrister and a descendant of the industrialist Henry family.

== Biography ==
Henry was born in the New Zealand milling town of Tokoroa, where his father Jack Henry was the Resident Director at New Zealand Forest Products Kinleith Mill.

In 1973, he graduated with an LLB from the University of Canterbury and was admitted to the bar of the High Court of Auckland in 1975. He joined the law firm of Wilson Henry (now Hesketh Henry), which had been established by his uncle the Hon. Sir Trevor Henry, and was the last member of the family to be a senior partner.

In 1986, he left the firm and commenced practice as a Barrister Sole based in Auckland. He has been involved in a number of high profile and controversial cases including the Equiticorp trials, where he represented a director of the failed 1980s conglomerate, and the Winebox Inquiry and subsequent judicial review. He was also involved in well-publicised controversy regarding the New Zealand First political party donations saga during the 2008 New Zealand general election.

A substantial part of his practice revolves around political work and he has represented a number of prominent New Zealand politicians, including Winston Peters (leader of New Zealand First and deputy prime minister), Wyatt Creech (former National Party MP and deputy prime minister) and Tuariki Delamere (former New Zealand First MP and minister).

In keeping with the Henry family's wide philanthropic interests, his practice undertakes a substantial amount of pro bono litigation work – he sued the New Zealand Department of Corrections on behalf of victims of the RSA murders and has represented Pacific Island immigrant families who were the victims of unscrupulous financial buy-back schemes.

He has two children by his first marriage, David Henry Jr. and Jaime Henry, and has since remarried.

In addition to his legal practice, he is chairman of the Henry family's capital management vehicle, Goldman Henry Capital.
