= Henry family =

The Henry family migrated to New Zealand from Scotland in the 1870s. In New Zealand they played a major role in forestry, industry, law and philanthropy.

They had originally worked as foresters and timbermillers in their homeland and, buttressed by their staunch Presbyterian faith and a regimented ethic for hardwork, they established what was to become one of New Zealand's largest industrial enterprises.

The Encyclopedia of New Zealand recognises the Henry family as being one of the three great Scottish industrialist families that settled in New Zealand in the 19th century. The others were the Fletchers (founders of Fletcher Construction, see James Fletcher) and the Todds (founders of Todd Motor Company and Todd Petroleum, see Todd Corporation Ltd).

== New Zealand Forest Products ==
New Zealand Forest Products (NZFP) was New Zealand's largest industrial company from its creation (following the consolidation of the New Zealand timbermilling sector) in 1936 until the privatisation of state-owned Telecom New Zealand in 1990.

The Henrys on arriving in New Zealand founded a timbermilling operation near Riverton in Southland . By the 1930s, they had expanded with several other operations around the country and were responsible for processing felled logs into timber for export.

In 1936, there was substantial consolidation in the New Zealand timber industry when the Henry's milling assets were combined with those of New Zealand Perpetual Forests, a bond-selling forestry company that had gone bankrupt with 150,000 hectares of plantations. Sir David Henry KBE was responsible for negotiations and this saw the creation of New Zealand Forest Products (NZFP).

Another member of the family, Jack Henry, was the Director of the Kinleith Division and the Forests Division. He pioneered new methods in silviculture which saw the company achieve major efficiency gains that turned NZFP into one of the largest forestry companies globally. He was the last Henry to sit on the board of NZFP retiring in 1986 as corporate raiders circled.

In 1986, the conglomerate Elders IXL, headed by Australian corporate raider John Elliot, made a successful hostile takeover bid for NZFP. This effectively ended the Henry family's 110 years of involvement in New Zealand industry.

== Law ==
Following the family's success in becoming one of New Zealand's leading industrialists, several members of the Henry extended family became involved in law, playing a pivotal role over several generations.

The Hon. Sir Trevor Henry graduated from law school at the University of Auckland in 1922 and went on to found the Auckland law firm Wilson Henry which continues as Hesketh Henry. He was appointed to the bench of the Supreme Court of New Zealand in 1955 and was knighted in 1971 for his services to Her Majesty's legal system.

His son, the Rt Hon Sir John Henry KNZM QC, followed his father into the law and was senior partner of Wilson Henry for many years before he was appointed Queen's Counsel. He continued in private practice as a barrister until 1984 when he was appointed to the bench of the High Court of New Zealand. He was later appointed a Privy Counsellor (see Privy Council of the United Kingdom), and was knighted as a Distinguished Companion of the New Zealand Order of Merit in 2001.

The lawyer Brian Henry graduated from the University of Canterbury in 1973 and became a senior partner at Wilson Henry in Auckland (now Hesketh Henry) before establishing his own practice as a barrister. He has maintained a high public profile, undertaking major litigation including the Royal Commission of Inquiry into Taxation (commonly referred to as the "Winebox Inquiry"), being successful in the subsequent Judicial Review of the Winebox Inquiry, representing directors in litigation following the collapse of the Equiticorp conglomerate in 1987, and pro bono work such as representing victims of the RSA murders in their litigation against the New Zealand Parole Board and Polynesian immigrant families who were the victims of unscrupulous buyback financial schemes.

== Philanthropy, relations with Maoridom and community involvement ==
In keeping with their role as one of New Zealand's largest industrialist families, the Henry's became philanthropists. Their focus on charity and giving reflected their Presbyterian faith. This continues in different guises.

The most well known member of the family is Sir David Henry KBE. He used his business success in Auckland, which had become the commercial heart of New Zealand by the 1930s, to become involved with a range of organisations. This included the Rotary Club of Auckland, becoming its President, the Boy Scouts' Association, and the Young Men's Christian Association (YMCA). He was a member of the Auckland Manufacturers’ Association, which led to his election as President of the National Manufacturers' Association. He also stood for public office and was elected a Councillor of the Auckland City Council from 1931–33. He believed passionately in education, endowing in 1956 a forestry scholarship bearing his name to provide overseas training for employees of NZFP. On his death, he left a substantial Trust to the Auckland Presbyterian Orphanages and Social Service Association. The funding provided by this Trust with later contributions from the Henry family and other sources continues as Presbyterian Support, one of New Zealand's largest charitable organisations.

At a time when indigenous relations in New Zealand were poor, the Henry Family were outspoken in their views of indigenous rights and pioneered relations with several tribes in Maoridom. Sister Annie Henry MBE JP was the embodiment of the family's views in this regard. Originally a teacher, she graduated from Deaconess College in 1920 and devoted her life to the education and betterment of the Maori people as a missionary in the Urewera Ranges of New Zealand. She was a pioneer of indigenous issues, protected Maori from exploitation by other New Zealand settlers and had a strong belief in the benefits of education and health for Maori at a time when this was neglected by the Colonial Government. Several Maori became prominent ministers in the Presbyterian Church of New Zealand as a result of her work and the family dedicated a wing of the Whakatane Museum in her memory.

The Hon. Sir Trevor Henry was a justice in the Supreme Court of New Zealand and was also involved following his retirement in a number of public service roles including being Chairman of the War Pensions Review Board, a member of the New Zealand Parole Board and a member of the New Zealand Olympic Games Selection Committee of 1936.

== Members ==
- Sir David Henry KBE - Forestry industrialist, founder of New Zealand Forest Products
- Sister Annie Henry MBE JP - New Zealand Presbyterian missionary
- Hon. Sir Trevor Henry - Supreme Court Justice, founder of law firm Hesketh Henry
- Jack Henry - Forestry industrialist, Company Director
- Rt Hon Sir John Henry KNZM QC - New Zealand Court of Appeal Justice, Privy Councillor
- Brian Henry - Barrister, Chairman of Goldman Henry Capital
