= Manufacturing in New Zealand =

Manufacturing in New Zealand contributed $23 billion (12%) of the country's gross domestic product and directly employed 241,000 people in 2017, while manufactured goods made up 52% of the country's exports by value. The food and beverage subsector alone contributed 32% of manufacturing's GDP and 71% of exports.

New Zealand has a disadvantage in export manufacturing due to its small population, isolated location, and high costs. Therefore, the majority of manufacturing is for the domestic markets, with the majority of exported manufactured goods being large-scale commodities (e.g. meat and dairy), high-value innovative products, and products targeting global niches.

== Employment ==
The manufacturing sector (ANZSIC division C) in New Zealand employed 238,417 people according to the 2018 New Zealand census, an increase from 188,286 people at the 2013 census. However, the proportion of employed New Zealanders working in manufacturing decreased slightly from 9.80% to 9.75%. The large increase in employee numbers between the 2013 and 2018 census was mainly due to Statistics New Zealand adding data from other sources (mainly employee monthly schedules from Inland Revenue) to the 2018 census to reduce the number of non-responses.

At the 2013 census, there were 133,644 males and 54,645 females working in manufacturing, a ratio of 2.45 males per female. The sex ratio varied from 0.83 males per female in the textile, leather, clothing and footwear subsector up to 7.22 males per female in the primary metals and metal products subsector.

== Subsectors ==
=== Food and beverage ===
==== Meat and meat products ====
The ship Dunedin successfully exported the first shipment of refrigerated meat from New Zealand to England in 1882, causing a rapid development of the meat processing industry. By 1892, New Zealand had 21 "freezing works" killing, gutting and freezing beef and lamb for export. The industry was mechanised and the production line ("chain") was introduced in the 1930s.

The 1970s and 1980s saw a material change to the freezing works industry. The UK joining the European Economic Community in 1973, stricter hygiene standards, new processing and packaging technologies, deregulation of the meat-processing industry in 1980 and the removal of agricultural subsidies in 1984 all contributed to the change. The inability to meet new hygiene standards as well as overcapacity saw many high-profile freezing works closures during the 1980s. In August 1994, five freezing works across the North Island closed after owner Weddel went into receivership.

As of May 2019, there are approximately 56 beef and lamb processing plants in New Zealand: 34 in the North Island and 22 in the South Island. Major companies include AFFCO Holdings, Alliance Group, ANZCO Foods, and Silver Fern Farms.

There are four major chicken and poultry processors in New Zealand: Brinks, Inghams, Tegel, and Turks. Together, the four companies produce 99% of New Zealand's poultry meat.

==== Dairy products ====
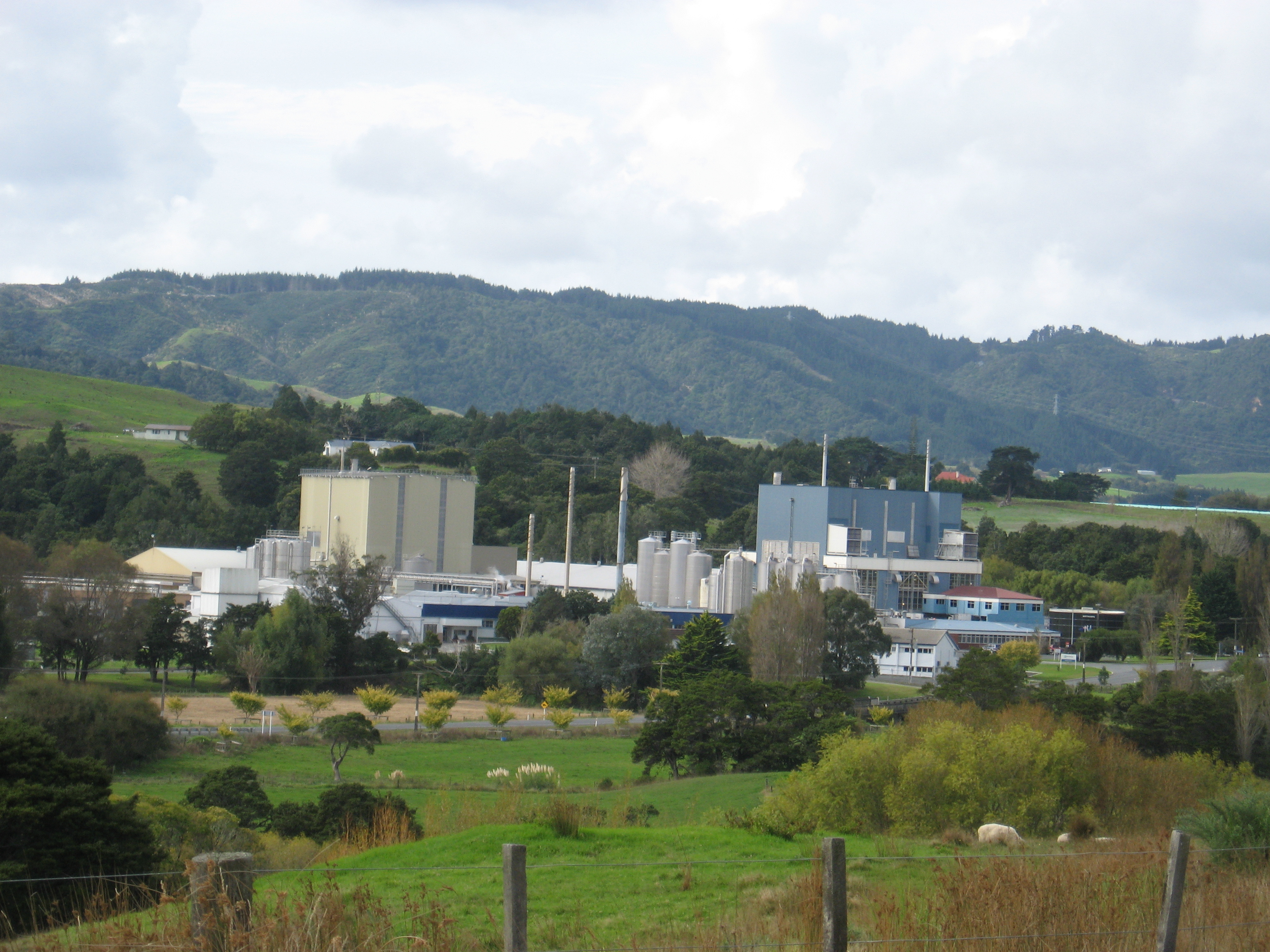
Fonterra dairy processing plant at Maungaturoto, Northland

At the peak in the 1920s, there were around 600 dairy processing plants in New Zealand. Improvements in transport and economies of scale soon saw the old smaller dairy factories replaced by new larger ones. For example, the dairy-rich Taranaki region went from 118 dairy factories in 1933 to just one (Whareroa, near Hāwera) in 1992.

Coinciding with the consolidation of dairy processing, many dairy co-operatives and companies merged over the years. By the late 1990s, there were just four major companies left: New Zealand Dairy Group (based in Waikato), Kiwi Co-operative Dairies (based in Taranaki), Westland Milk Products, and Tatua Dairy Company. In 2001, the Dairy Industry Restructuring Act 2001 was passed, allowing New Zealand Dairy Group and Kiwi Dairies to merge with the New Zealand Dairy Board to form Fonterra.

Smaller and boutique dairy companies in New Zealand include The a2 Milk Company and Lewis Road Creamery.

=== Wood and paper ===
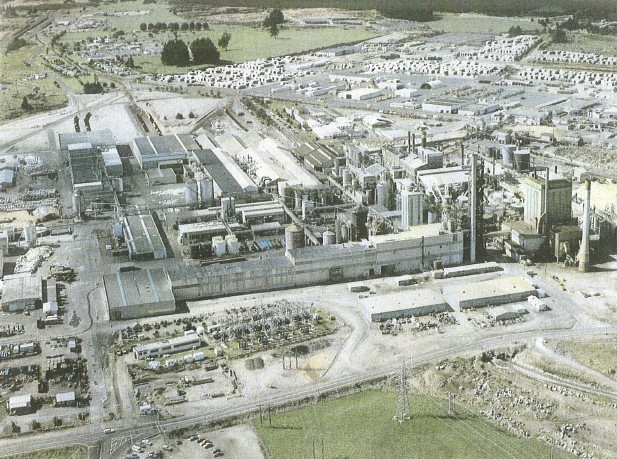
Kinleith Mill

New Zealand has several pulp and paper mills. The largest complex is Tasman Mill in Kawerau, where Norske Skog owns a combined pulp and paper mill, Oji Fibre Solutions runs a pulp mill, and SCA runs a paper mill. New Zealand Forest Products owns and operated four mills: Te Papapa (paper), Kinleith (pulp and paper), Whakatāne (paper), and Mataura (pulp and paper). Pulp-only mills include Winstone Pulp at Karioi, near Ohakune, and Pan Pac Forest Products at Whirinaki, near Napier. Combined, the mills produce around 1.52 million tonnes of paper per year.

=== Chemicals ===
As part of the Muldoon government's "Think Big" programme in the early 1980s, two major chemical processing plants were established in Taranaki to take advantage of the region's natural gas resources, primarily the Maui gas field. These were the Kapuni ammonia-urea plant and the Motunui methanol and synthetic petrol plant.

The Kapuni plant southwest of Eltham was commissioned in 1982. The plant uses the Haber process to react natural gas and atmospheric nitrogen to form ammonia, then reacts the resulting ammonia with carbon dioxide to form urea. In 1992, the plant was sold to the Bay of Plenty Fertiliser Co-operative, now Ballance Agri-Nutrients, who continues to operate the plant. As of April 2026, it produces about a third of New Zealand's urea requirements.

The Motunui plant near Waitara was commissioned in 1986. The plant used a two-stage process, converting natural gas to methanol and then converting the methanol to synthetic petrol using a process developed by Mobil. The synthetic petrol process became uneconomic in the late 1990s as a result of falling oil prices, so the synthetic petrol part of the plant was decommissioned in April 1999. Today, the Motunui plant continues to produce methanol and is owned and operated by Methanex.

=== Oil refining ===
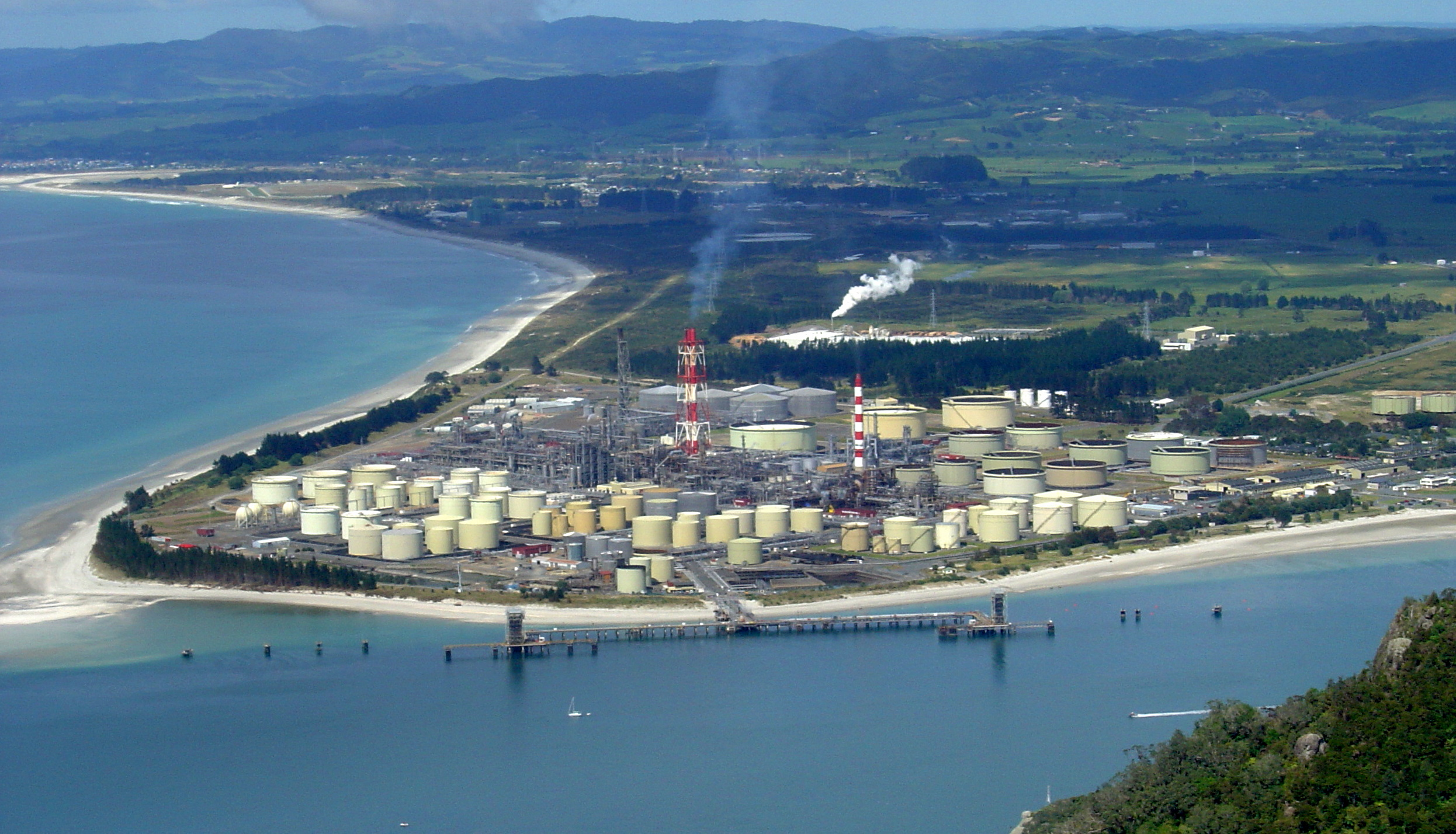
Marsden Point Oil Refinery

Marsden Point Oil Refinery was New Zealand's only oil refinery, located in Northland. It opened in 1964 and closed in 2022. In 2017, it refined 41.7 million barrels of crude oil, meeting 68% of New Zealand's fuel requirements.

=== Metals ===
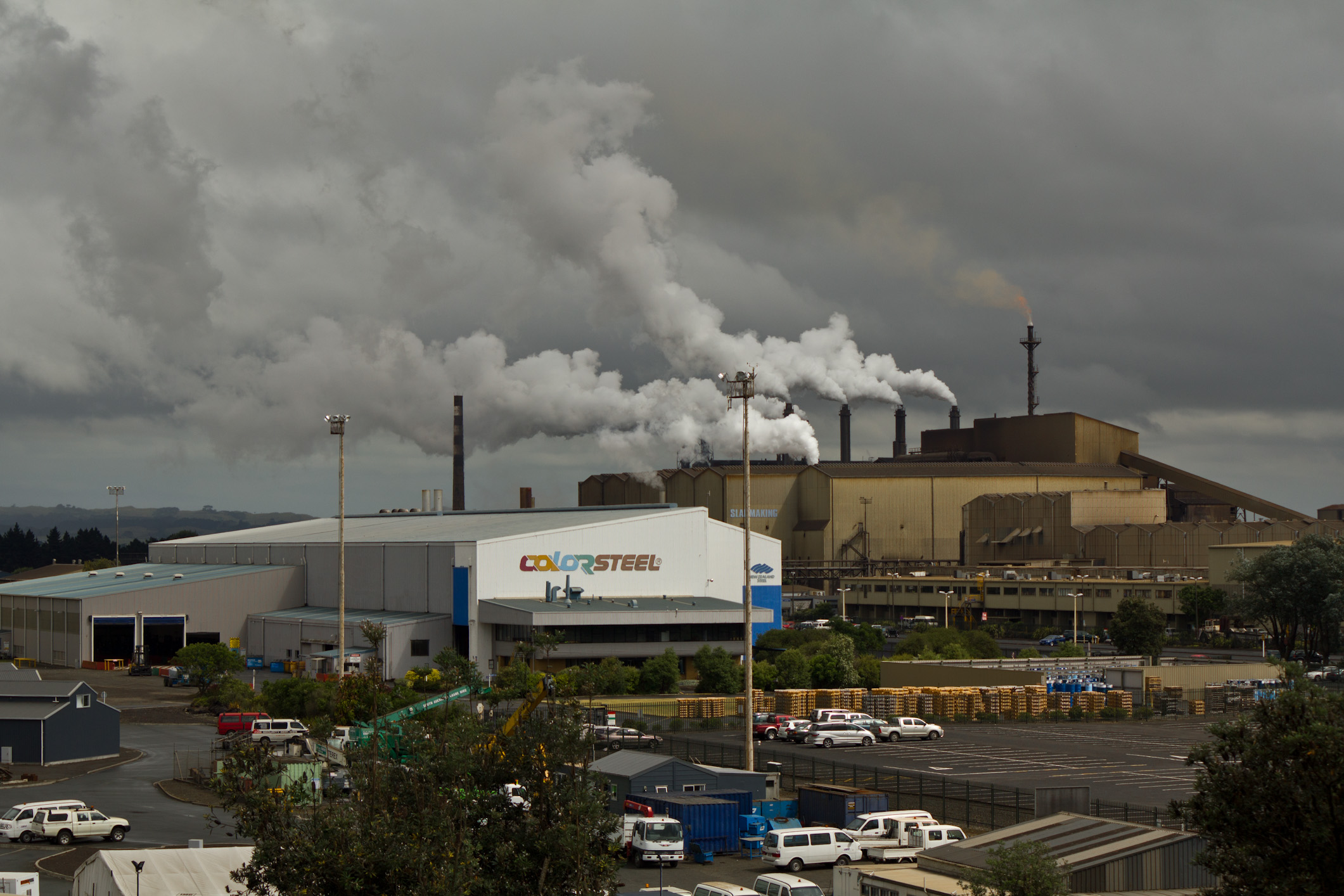
New Zealand Steel's mill at Glenbrook

New Zealand Steel operates the Glenbrook steel mill, near Waiuku south of Auckland. Commissioned in 1969, the Glenbrook mill uses ironsand as the ore, in contrast to many steel mills internationally. The ironsand is mined at the Waikato North Head mine at Otaua, and sent to the mill via an 18-kilometre underground pipeline. The mill produces approximately 650,000 tonnes of steel, primarily flat rolled steel, per year.

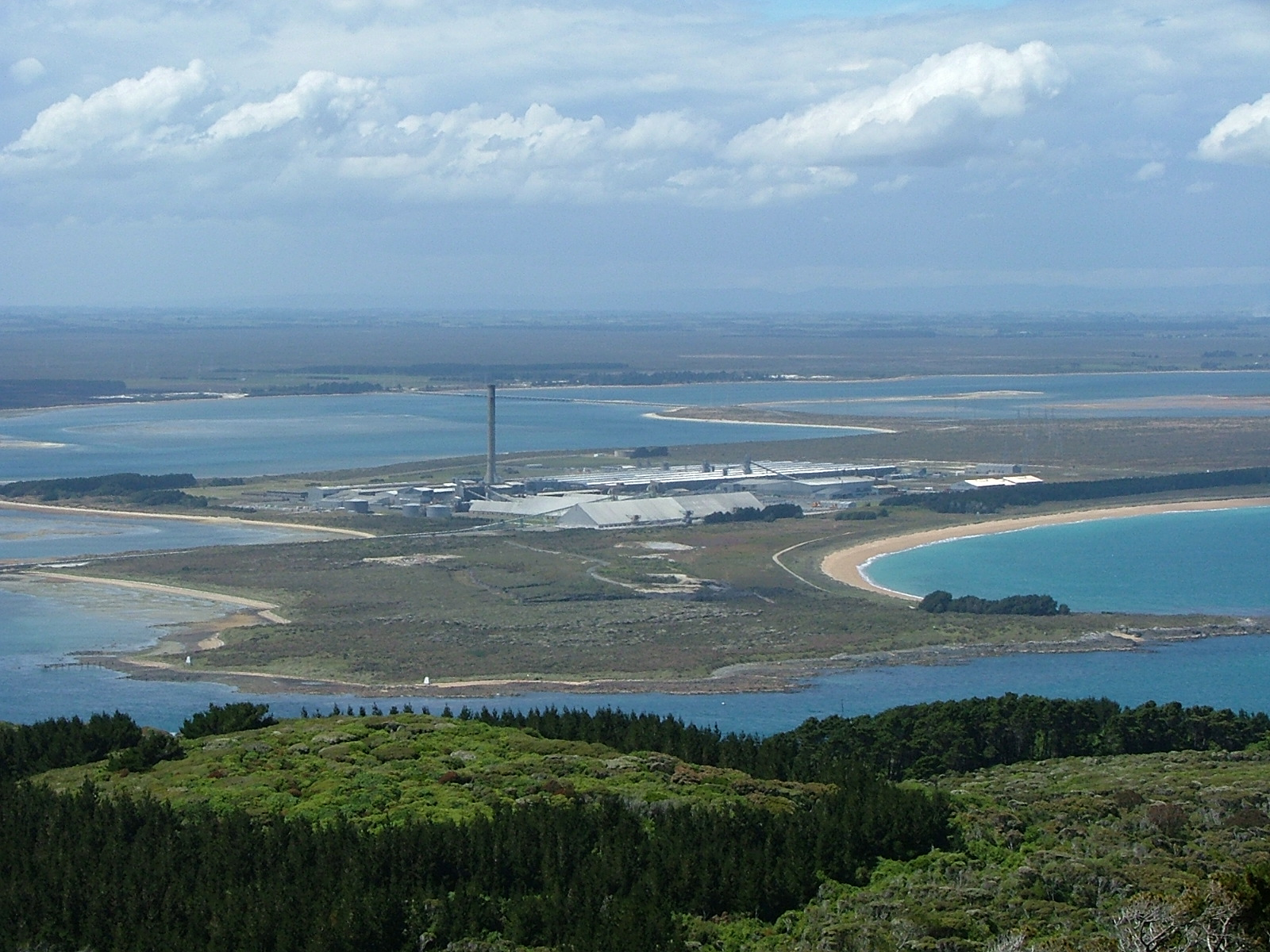
Tiwai Point Aluminium Smelter

The Tiwai Point Aluminium Smelter, near Bluff in Southland, is New Zealand's only aluminum smelter, and is owned and operated by New Zealand Aluminium Smelters. The smelter was commissioned in 1971, taking advantage of the 800-megawatt Manapouri Power Station in Fiordland, built in conjunction with the smelter, to supply the required electricity. As New Zealand doesn't have any significant bauxite deposits, all the raw materials for the smelter are imported from overseas.

Under the "Think Big" programme, an aluminium smelter was proposed at Aramoana, near Dunedin, but the proposal was dropped due to public opposition.
