= Economic history of New Zealand =

Map of New Zealand

The economic history of New Zealand dates to before European colonisation of the country. By the 20th century, it had become one of the most globalised economies in the world, relying heavily on international trade with developed countries including Australia, Canada, China, European Union, the United States, Japan, and South Korea. It is a mixed economy that functions on free-market principles and has a sizeable manufacturing and service sector and an efficient agricultural sector. New Zealand has the 54th largest export economy in the world measured by nominal gross domestic product. In 2016, New Zealand exported a total of NZ$35.1billion and imported a total of NZ$35.4 billion, with its top exports being concentrated milk and the top imports being cars. New Zealand has an extremely diverse market economy with a sizeable service sector that accounted for 63% of all GDP in 2013. Other industries including mining, manufacturing, waste services, electricity and gas accounted for 16.5% of GDP in 2013 while the primary sector only accounted for 6.5% of GDP, despite continually dominating New Zealand's exports. The biggest capital market for New Zealand is known as the New Zealand Exchange. As of June 2018 the NZX had listed over 300 securities with a market capitalisation of NZD $164.5 billion.

== Overview ==
New Zealand Government Gross Debt as percent of GDP 1860 to 2000

The economy of New Zealand has been listed as seventh in the world for Social Progression, a societal tracker that watches areas such as Basic Human Needs, Foundations of Wellbeing, and the level of Opportunity provided to its residents. However, New Zealand's economy used to be much stronger than it is today. During the 1970s, the New Zealand income level was higher than it was in many of the other countries in Western Europe leading up to the oil shock crisis of this time. Due to the fact that income levels dropped in relative terms and have yet to be able to fully recover, the percentage of New Zealand citizens living in poverty has skyrocketed and there have been further increases in income inequality. Furthermore, New Zealand has dealt with current account deficit issues since the crisis of the 1970s with these deficits peaking in 2006 at −7.8% of GDP, but falling back down to −2.6% of GDP in 2014. Regardless of this, the outstanding government debt, in 2014, stood at 38.4% of GDP and between 1984 and 2006, the debt owed to foreign investors increased 11 times to a total of NZ$182 billion. Undeterred by the current account deficit problems, the difference on external goods and service has typically shown positive gains in the economy. In the 2014 fiscal year exports outpaced imports by NZ$3.9 billion.

Over the last half-century, the government of New Zealand has been able to transform the country from an agrarian-based economy, that was extremely reliant upon the British for access to their markets, to an industrialised, free economy that is able to compete with other highly developed countries on the global scale. Prior to the market crash in 2007, per capita incomes had risen steadily for 10 consecutive years and then receded in 2008 and 2009. However, for the first half of the decade debt-driven spending had driven growth and this, in turn, caused the central bank to continuously raise its key rate from 2004–2008, at which point it was among the highest in the OCED. New Zealand remains focused on expanding its free trade network as a top foreign policy priority as they were one of the earliest backing parties for the Trans Pacific Partnership and the second country to ratify it.

== Economy before 1840 ==
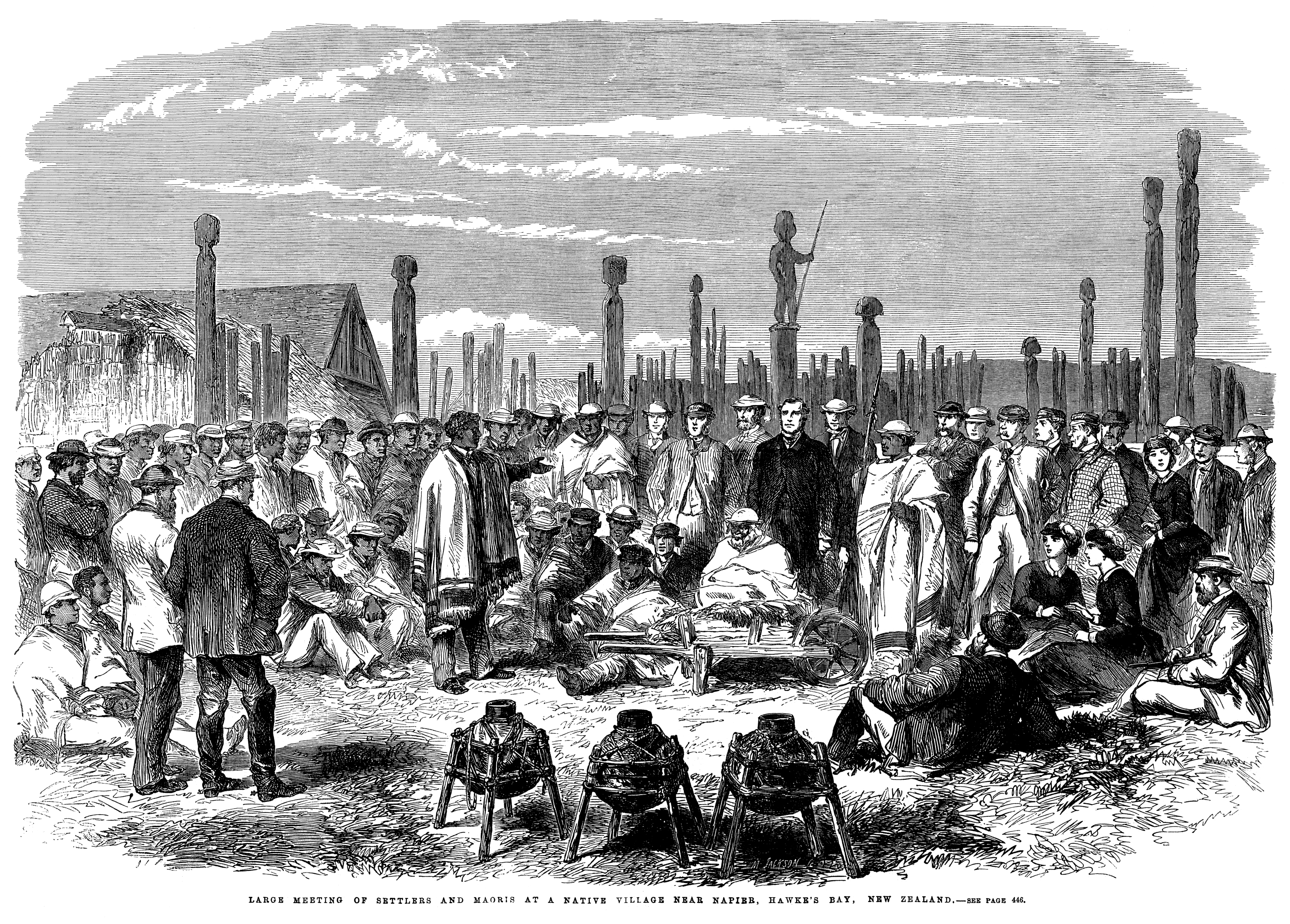
Meeting of Settlers and Maoris at Hawke's Bay, New Zealand

Prior to the arrival of the Europeans in New Zealand, the land was occupied by the Maori. The Maori were Polynesian tribes that had built perennial establishments and exploited the natural resources of the land in order to provide themselves with a way of life. It was around the 15th century that exploitation of these resources slowed down, and the economy went with it. The use of capital during this time, such as clearing forests and building houses, was just enough to cover the population growth and minimal use of capital means that there was little total per-capita economic growth. Some of this slow growth can be attributed to natural events such as; volcanoes, tsunamis, earthquakes, and droughts. It was the warfare between the tribes that kept the economy going during these years as the construction and re-construction of fortifications would have used energy and resources from the tribes.

It was not until the Europeans arrived bringing with them new technologies, ideas, plants, animals, and sources of capital that economic growth was seen in the New Zealand lands again. Many of these European colonies were reliant upon the Maori for food and the Maori obliged by providing the foreigners with goods from their lands. The Maori were keen to trade with the new arrivals and typically bartered with potatoes, corn, and flax for weapons, alcohol, tobacco and most importantly – European tools and products. The relationships between the Maori and the Europeans did not last more than a few decades as the European towns and villages became increasingly self-sustaining and by usurping the fertile lands which the Maori used to grow their crops. By the 1830s, money was becoming widely used among the Maori and it was shortly after this that banks were established in the area.

== Growing economy 1840–1930 ==
=== Banking ===
The first bank in New Zealand was the Union Bank of Australia, which began operations in Britannia (now part of Petone) in 1840.

Individual banks issued their own banknotes, but in 1847, the government founded the Colonial Bank of Issue to centralise currency issuance. However, the bank ceased operations in 1856. The Reserve Bank of New Zealand, founded in 1934, became the sole issuer of currency.

=== Infrastructure and resources ===
The young colony desperately needed infrastructure; many necessities required to support the economy and society had to be built from the ground up. During the 1860s the settlers began to extract a variety of minerals, including gold. Towns and settlements sprung up and flourished near gold-mining sites, and they gave the economy a temporary boost as resources were used up and the locals benefited from the business they received. There were long-term benefits from this extraction, as well as the desperately needed roads, railways, ports, and factories which New Zealanders established as people moved from site to site.

Gold quickly became the most significant depletable resource of the 19th century in New Zealand. In the 1860s alone, gold export-receipts contributed more to the economy than wool did and totalled £46 million by 1890. The gold resource in its entirety was a relatively small one in the world market, but New Zealand was also an extremely small economy in the 1860s.

This boom in the economy allowed Dunedin to become the richest of the New Zealand cities by 1880s, but the citizens soon found they would need another source of capital as the extracted minerals became largely depleted by the end of the century. The amount of capital the settlers had was declining as they had mainly relied on the capital they had brought with them, upon their arrival, to sustain themselves. Settlements realised there would need to be another product which could be exported to generate revenue to pay for the upkeep of infrastructure and repay their debts. Wool became New Zealand's first large export staple, exported from the Wellington settlement towards the end of the 1850s. New Zealand began to produce and export staple goods at a rapid pace, and this helped to shape society as well as to establish a tone for economic growth, greatly helped by the introduction of refrigeration in 1882. This new technology allowed New Zealand to export frozen products such as meat and dairy products to markets previously considered unreachable. The economy relied largely on the export of dairy, meat and wool for the next 100 years.

The vast majority of New Zealand's imports came from Britain. Beginning in 1903, when New Zealand gained the autonomy to set its own tariffs, the country extended preferential tariff-rates to selected commodities imported from Britain. However, New Zealand's policy of imperial preference was largely ineffective at increasing the share of its imports from Britain. It was not until the interwar era that Britain began to reciprocate in the form of preferential tariff-rates for New Zealand's exports, which were mostly destined for Britain.

=== Depression ===
From the late 1870s to the mid-1890s, New Zealand experienced a depression that was the result of quarrying a finite amount of resources and part of the worldwide Long Depression. The depression was foreshadowed by the closing of the City Bank of Glasgow in 1878, which in turn led to a reduction of credit that was available to New Zealand. Many farmers lost their homes and lands and turned to "sweating" in the factories because of a lack of jobs for rural workers. Fewer immigrants arrived as people began emigrating to Australia. In 1888 there were 10,000 more people that left New Zealand than arrived and during the years of the depression, 1881–1890, the overall gain from migration was just 40,000.

== 1930–1990 ==
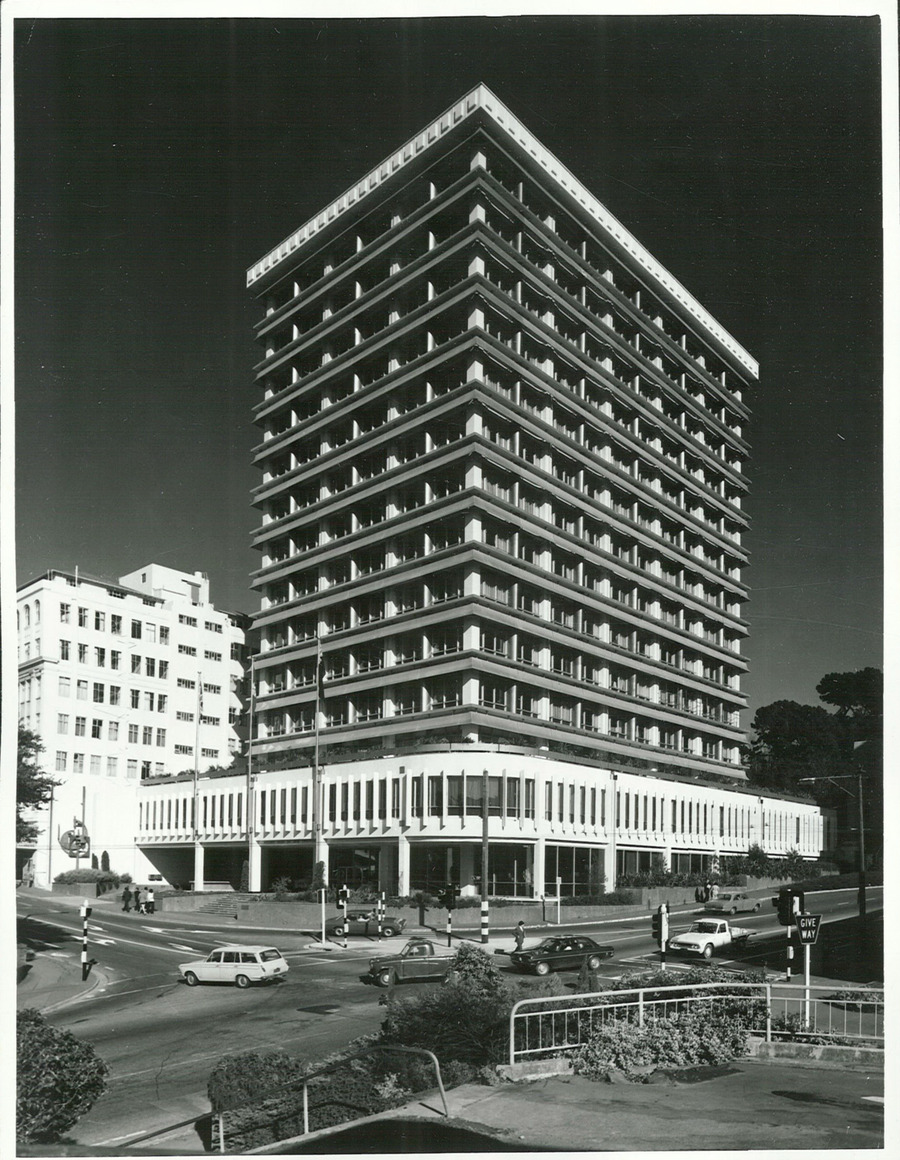
Reserve Bank of New Zealand

It was not until the 1930s that New Zealand established its own central bank titled The Reserve Bank of New Zealand, it was established in 1934 and was constituted under the Reserve Bank of New Zealand Act of 1989 with its primary purpose being to provide "stability in the general level of prices". Before then, all monetary policy was decided in the United Kingdom and New Zealand Pound, which was the currency until 1967, was issued by independent, private banks. One of the first measures the new central bank took was to give itself the ability to implement its own economic agenda as it saw fit and quickly took strides to better defend the economy and people from the world markets.

By the middle of the century, pastoral products made up over 90% of the country's exports with more than 60% of that going towards the British market, which established a heavy reliance upon Britain for access to its markets. Growth and production were strong and consistent beginning in 1935 following the Great Depression and lasting through the Second World War as both men and women worked outside of the home to contribute to the war. The economy slowed down following the end of the war, but surged again from the 1950s through the 1960s and was brought about by high demand for pastoral products and a labour force that was growing fast enough to fit right into the growing manufacturing sector. Trading had never been better for New Zealand and prices skyrocketed for virtually all of their exporting products, which meant that New Zealand was quickly climbing up the income rankings. During the 1950s, the income per-capita in New Zealand was 88% of that in the United States. This was helped by tough import controls, which gave the local manufacturers the ability to manufacture nearly identical products locally, expand their factories and operations, and compete against the much higher priced imports. The Reserve Bank's primary role during this time was to implement and handle the effects of the fluctuations in government spending as the inflation rates remained low through the end of the 1960s.

The 1950s were exceptionally prosperous for New Zealand, but it was evident that Britain was beginning to look elsewhere in Europe for trading partners. This meant that New Zealand would have to struggle for access to the markets it once supplied with its products, especially once the United Kingdom joined the EEC in 1973 and all trade agreements with New Zealand officially came to an end. At the end of 1966, the price of wool was cut by 40% as it was replaced by a synthetic fibre and this posed a large issue for New Zealand as wool was one of its top exports and the entire economy underwent a diversification period as its solution.

New Zealand began looking for an alternative source of capital via exporting goods as it was no longer able to trade with Britain. The loss of wool in 1966 and the depression of dairy and meat prices meant that change had to happen fast if the economy was to still operate at a functioning level. Through the 1960s, New Zealand had operated by exporting pastoral products such as dairy, meat, and wool. By 2008 the single biggest export good was tourism, bringing in over a quarter of the total export revenue and in 2017 export goods had increased another NZ$406 million. Other forms of diversification are still present; pharmaceuticals, milk powders and fine wool garments.

=== Think Big ===
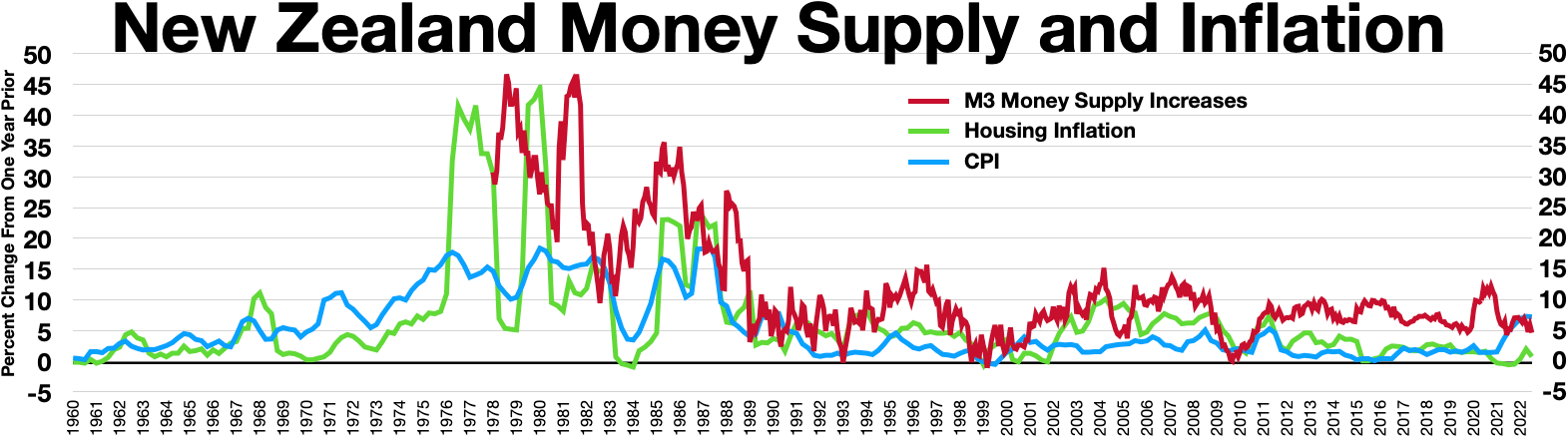
New Zealand money supply and inflation M3 money supply increases Housing inflation Consumer price index

New Zealand Prime Minister Sir Robert Muldoon was the face behind the Think Big strategy that was implemented during his time at the head of the National party. This strategy was devised to establish 400,000 jobs, following the second oil shock in 1979, and push New Zealand toward being self-sufficient in the energy sector. Massive industrial plants were built on New Zealand's natural gas reserves and a wide variety of new products for export such as ammonia, urea fertiliser, methanol, and petrol were produced. However, bad timing struck and many of these projects were available for use right as oil prices hit the ground, dropping from US$90 a barrel to US$30 a barrel within a few years. Due to these Think Big projects requiring capital to get started, the public debt shot through the roof from NZ$4.2 billion to a staggering NZ$21.9 billion 9 years later when Muldoon left the position of Prime Minister. It has been speculated that these debts have cost taxpayers over NZ$7 billion since the early 1980s.

=== Reform ===
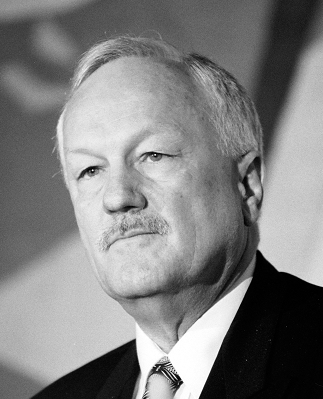
Roger Douglas

Between the years of 1984 and 1990, New Zealand underwent a period of large reform on the components that guide the economy and public administration. These reforms are sometimes referred to as Rogernomics, named after the Minister of Finance, Roger Douglas, who carried them out. There were a large number of changes to the economy and how it was run during Douglas' time as Minister of Finance, some of the changes included making the Reserve Bank independent of political decisions, subsidy-free agriculture, loosening import regulations, removing controls on interest rates, and more. These changes continued to be implemented under two different governments, helping to solve a wide range of economic restructuring and governmental problems, as well as generating a substantial amount of social change. New Zealand relied heavily on privatisation to help with its reform period by selling off telecommunications, airlines, computing services, government printing offices, and many others. The government decided that many agencies in the economy should be viewed as profit-making and tax-paying enterprises.

== Open economy ==
New Zealand gross domestic product and net international debt

New Zealand's economy entered into the longest period of significant growth in 1998 and lasted until 2006. This growth came as a result of a newly diversified and deregulated economy and benefitted the economy a great deal. For the first time in history, New Zealand was running long-term fiscal surpluses in the OECD and unemployment had fallen to never before seen levels. Despite these improvements, the country remained stagnant on the international income ranking level due to higher interest rates stemming from an unwillingness to save. Nonetheless, New Zealand is still a top choice for foreign investors which totalled NZ$107.69 billion in 2014, a statistic which has increased more than 1,000 percent since 1989 when foreign investment totalled NZ$9.7 billion.

== Economic outlook ==
Since the 1980s, New Zealand has gone from being one of the most heavily regulated economies in the OECD to one of the least regulated and most free market economies.
