= Life imprisonment in New Zealand =

Life imprisonment has been the most severe criminal sentence in New Zealand since the death penalty was abolished in 1989, having not been used since 1957.

Offenders sentenced to life imprisonment must serve a minimum of 10 years imprisonment before they are eligible for parole, although the sentencing judge may set a longer minimum period or decline to set a minimum period at all (meaning the offender will spend the rest of their life in prison). Released offenders remain on parole and are subject to electronic tagging for the rest of their life.

Life imprisonment in New Zealand for crimes other than murder is relatively rare. Of 941 life sentences imposed since 1980, only seven have been for crimes other than murder – one for manslaughter in 1996, one for an act of terrorism in 2020, and five for drug offences in 1985, 1996, 2008 (two) and 2009.

== Legal framework ==
The framework for sentencing in New Zealand is largely governed by statutory law, and is covered by various acts of parliament, including most prominently the Crimes Act 1961 and the Sentencing Act 2002.

Life is the mandatory sentence for treason (except in charges of conspiracy). It is the presumptive sentence for murder, being mandatory except in circumstances it would be "manifestly unjust". Life imprisonment is an optional sentence for aircraft hijacking, Class A drug dealing, manslaughter and terrorism.

=== Murder ===
The imposition of life imprisonment for murder is codified in sections 102 to 104 of the Sentencing Act 2002.

Circumstances where life imprisonment might be deemed manifestly unjust include mercy killings, suicide pacts, and "battered defendants" who were subjected to "prolonged and severe abuse". It also includes some cases where the murderer was aged 25 or less, as young people "tend to have poor impulse control and difficulty in regulating emotions".

There is no minimum age for imposing life imprisonment, although those under 18 may not be sentenced to life without parole. The youngest people sentenced to life imprisonment in New Zealand were aged 13 years at the time of the offence.

=== Case law ===
- R v Williams [2005] 2 NZLR 506 – judgement providing guidance on sentencing offenders subject to the 17-year minimum period of imprisonment contained in section 104 of the Sentencing Act 2002.
- Churchward v R [2011] NZCA 531; (2011) 25 CRNZ 446 – judgement providing guidance on imposing minimum periods of imprisonment when sentencing adolescent offenders.
- The Queen v Brenton Harrison Tarrant [2020] NZHC 2192 - first-ever judgement for life imprisonment without parole in New Zealand, discussing the legal principles providing for such a possibility.

== Longest minimum periods of imprisonment ==
A sentence of life imprisonment without the possibility of parole has been given only once, to Brenton Tarrant for the Christchurch mosque shootings in March 2019. Although there was no maximum on non-parole terms, the possibility of sentencing for life without parole had been made explicit in 2010. The longest minimum period of imprisonment on a sentence of life imprisonment with possibility of parole is 30 years, currently being served by William Dwane Bell.

Sentences imposed with a minimum term of imprisonment of 20 years or more or with no possibility of parole include:

Length	Offender	Date of offence	Description
Without parole	Brenton Harrison Tarrant	15 March 2019	Committing the Christchurch mosque shootings, involving 51 murders, 40 attempted murders, and engaging in a terrorist act. Sentenced to life imprisonment without parole on 23 August 2020.
30 years	William Dwane Bell	8 December 2001	Murder of three people and attempted murder of a fourth during an armed robbery at the Panmure RSA clubrooms. He was initially jailed for a minimum period of 33 years, which was reduced by 3 years on appeal.
28 years	Paul Russell Wilson	7 April 2018	Murder of Nicole Tuxford. He had murdered his girlfriend Kimberley Schroder in 1994 and killed Tuxford while on parole.
27 years	Russell John Tully	1 September 2014	Murder of two staff members and attempted murder of a third at the Ashburton Work and Income office. He also received an 11-year sentence for the attempted murder and 4 years for firearms-related charges, served concurrently.
27 years	Eli Bob Sauni Epiha	19 June 2020	Murder of police officer Matthew Hunt and attempted murder of another police officer as they went to assist at a car crash.
26 years	Graeme Burton	6 January 2007	One murder, two attempted murders and eight other offences – two aggravated robbery, two of kidnapping, two of using a firearm against a law enforcement officer, aggravated injury and injuring with reckless disregard – during a shooting spree in the Wainuiomata hills. He was also sentenced to preventive detention with a non-parole period of 26 years for the ten secondary offences. He had murdered a man in 1992 and was on parole in 2007.
25 years	Bruce Howse	4 December 2001	Murder of his stepdaughters, 12-year-old Saliel Aplin and 11-year-old Olympia Jetson, at their Masterton home. Reduced from 28 years on appeal.
24 years	Tony Douglas Robertson	24 May 2014	Murder of Blessie Gotingco. He was on parole from a prison sentence for abducting and molesting a 5-year-old girl.
23 years	Liam Reid	15 November 2007	Murder of Emma Agnew in Christchurch. Reduced from 26 years on appeal.
23 years	Jason Somerville	September 2008, August 2009	Murder of neighbour Tisha Lowry in 2008 and his wife Rebecca Chamberlain in 2009, burying both bodies under his home in Christchurch.
23 years	Jeremy McLaughlin	10 November 2011	Murder of 13-year-old Jade Bayliss by strangulation while burgling her Christchurch house, before trying to cover up the murder by setting fire to the house. He had previously been in a relationship with Bayliss's mother but the relationship ended after conflict between him and Jade. He also received 8 years for the burglary and 4 years for arson, served concurrently. He had previously been sentenced to 12 years imprisonment in Australia for the 1995 manslaughter of 14-year-old Phillip Vidot.
23 years	Joseph James Brider	22 January 2022	Murder of Juliana Herrera in Christchurch. Brider was on parole for an earlier rape.
22 years	Hayden Tasker	1 January 2025	Murder of Police Senior Sergeant Lyn Fleming and serious injuring of Senior Sergeant Adam Ramsay by deliberately driving a vehicle into them during a police operation in Nelson.
22 years	Esarona David Lologa	16 May 2023	Murder of five people and arson. He set fire to the Loafers Lodge boarding house and the five died in the blaze.
21 years	Hayden McKenzie	September or October 2003	Murder of Jae-hyeon Kim. He had murdered James (Janis) Bambrough in 1999 and had already served four years for that, so will serve a total of 25 years before being eligible for parole.
21 years	Kamal Gyanendra Reddy	December 2006 or January 2007	Murder of his girlfriend and her 3-year-old daughter.
20 years 6 months	Mikaere Puata-Chaney	15 July 2022	Murder by shooting of his ex-partner Eliza Trubuhovich and her father Geoffrey Trubuhovich in Glendene, Auckland.
20 years	Mark Lundy	29 August 2000	Murder of his wife Christine and seven-year-old daughter Amber at their Palmerston North home. Increased from 17 years on appeal. The Privy Council quashed Lundy's convictions in 2013 and ordered a retrial. In 2015, Lundy was re-convicted of the murders and re-sentenced to the earlier 20-year minimum imprisonment.
20 years	David Konia	27 May 2005	Murder of Margaret Waldin and Ted Ferguson at Ferguson's Feilding home. Konia died on 14 January 2015 after being diagnosed with terminal cancer a year earlier.
20 years	Siuaki Lisiate	5 March 2020	Murder of fellow prisoner Blake Lee. He was previously convicted of the murder of fellow prisoner Tue Faavae in 2009 and the wounding with intent to cause grievous bodily harm of fellow prisoner Graeme Burton (see above) in 2019.

Antonie Dixon was given a minimum term of 20 years for the murder of James Te Aute on 21 January 2003, but the conviction was later quashed. He was re-tried and reconvicted, but committed suicide in his prison cell before he could be re-sentenced.

The longest minimum period for a woman is 19 years, currently being served by Tracy Jean Goodman for the murder of pensioner Mona Morriss in the course of a burglary in Marton in January 2005.

== Preventive detention ==
There is also provision for an indefinite sentence of preventive detention, which can be given for sexual or violent crimes for which life imprisonment is not available (preventive detention can be imposed alongside life imprisonment, for example, where convictions for sexual or violent crimes accompany a murder conviction). Since the Sentencing Act 2002 came into force, this has been given to repeat sexual offenders and serious violent recidivist offenders. Preventive detention has a minimum period of imprisonment of five years, but the sentencing judge can extend this if they believe that the prisoner's history warrants it. The sentence of preventive detention was first introduced in the Criminal Justice Act 1954. As of 2013, the longest minimum period of imprisonment on a sentence of preventive detention is one of 28 years, which was given in 1984. Alfred Thomas Vincent was in prison on preventive detention for 52 years from 1968 to 2021.
