= Jack Henry (industrialist) =

New Zealand businessman (1917–2003)

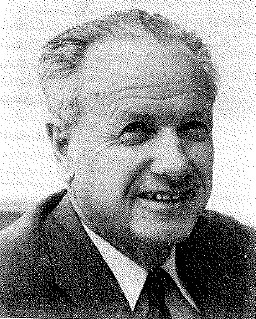
Jack Henry

Jack Euan Henry (10 June 1917 – 9 June 2003) was a New Zealand industrialist and company director.

== Early life ==
Henry was born in Rotorua on 10 June 1917 to John and Edith Anna Henry. John Henry was a forester and sawmiller and several of his other children would go on to play significant roles in their respective fields in New Zealand — Jack’s older brothers, the Hon. Sir Trevor Henry and Clive Henry, would go on to distinguished legal careers.

The road to success, however, was not to be made easy for the family. Similarly to many established New Zealand families of the day, Jack Henry’s childhood would be a difficult one as the country faced the economic challenges of the aftermath of the First World War and the onset of the 1930s Great Depression.

In 1931, at the age of 14, he left school to work in farming in Northland and then entered the New Zealand State Forest Service in 1938. The State Forest Service was a government organization charged with the planting and maintenance of the New Zealand Crown Estate forests.

Following the outbreak of the Second World War in 1939, Henry joined the Royal New Zealand Air Force and saw action in the Pacific theatre. Upon returning to New Zealand, he was appointed as a member of the New Zealand-American Fiordland Expedition which undertook surveying in the remote Fiordland region of Southern New Zealand and attended the University of Otago, where he completed his BSc in Botany.

== The New Zealand Forest Products Ltd years ==
In October 1949, he would make the most important step of his career in joining New Zealand Forest Products Ltd (NZFP), New Zealand’s largest industrial company, as a Forest Administrator of the company’s then 176,000 acres (710 km^{2}) of plantations. At this time NZFP faced a crisis following the devastating Taupo forest fires of 1946 and a further 50% of its forest estate had been killed by the deadly Sirex disease. Henry’s solution was to implement pioneering silviculture methods that would see the NZFP forestry estate grow to some 500,000 acres (2,000 km^{2}) within a decade.

Following his successes with the forestry estate, Henry was appointed General Manager of the Forests Division in 1963 by Sir David Henry KBE and would go on to sit as a Director of the Company from 1976 to 1986 (serving from 1978 as the Resident Director of the Kinleith milling complex and supervising the Company’s nationwide forestry interests).

He married Betty Henry and they were to have four children. His two eldest sons, Douglas and Trevor, would go on to work for New Zealand Forest Products while his youngest son, Brian Henry, would join Wilson Henry (now Hesketh Henry), the Auckland law firm of Jack’s brother, the Hon. Sir Trevor Henry.

Jack’s resignation from the Company coincided with the hostile takeover bid that would see New Zealand Forest Products sold to the Australian corporate raider, John Elliot. This effectively ended the Henry family’s 110 years of involvement in New Zealand industry.

== Community ==
Like many members of the Henry Family before him, Jack’s contributions to the New Zealand community were considerable. He was a member of the New Zealand Forestry Council (1972–1982) and President of the Forest Owners’ Association (1983–1985).

He was also actively involved in scientific fundraising for Dothistroma research, Frank Newhook’s pathology programme, as well as endowing the Chair of Wood Science and providing Visiting Fellows for the School of Forestry at the University of Canterbury.

He was also actively involved in the New Zealand Forestry Institute as a member from 1950 onwards, being made President (1960–1962) and awarded Honorary Membership in 1978.

== Death ==
Henry died in Brisbane in 2003.
