= Living Legends (reforestation project) =

Reforestation project in New Zealand

Living Legends was an organization that managed 17 native tree planting projects throughout New Zealand from 2011–2015. Each planting took place in conjunction with provincial rugby unions and was dedicated to a regional "Rugby Legend" selected by the union. These Rugby Legends are people who have made a significant contribution to rugby in New Zealand.

Living Legends planted over 170,000 native trees. The plantings all took place on public conservation land.

Plantings were scheduled to be held in Northland, Auckland, Waikato, Bay of Plenty, Taupō, Taranaki, Hawke’s Bay, Manawatu, Horowhenua/Kapiti, Wellington, Tasman, Buller/West Coast, Mid Canterbury, Christchurch, Otago and Southland.

Living Legends was a joint venture of Project Crimson, an environmental charity with 20 years experience in community-based native restoration projects and the Tindall Foundation. It was sponsored by the Department of Conservation and Meridian Energy.
