= Carters Building Supplies =

New Zealand building supply store chain

CARTERS Building Supplies

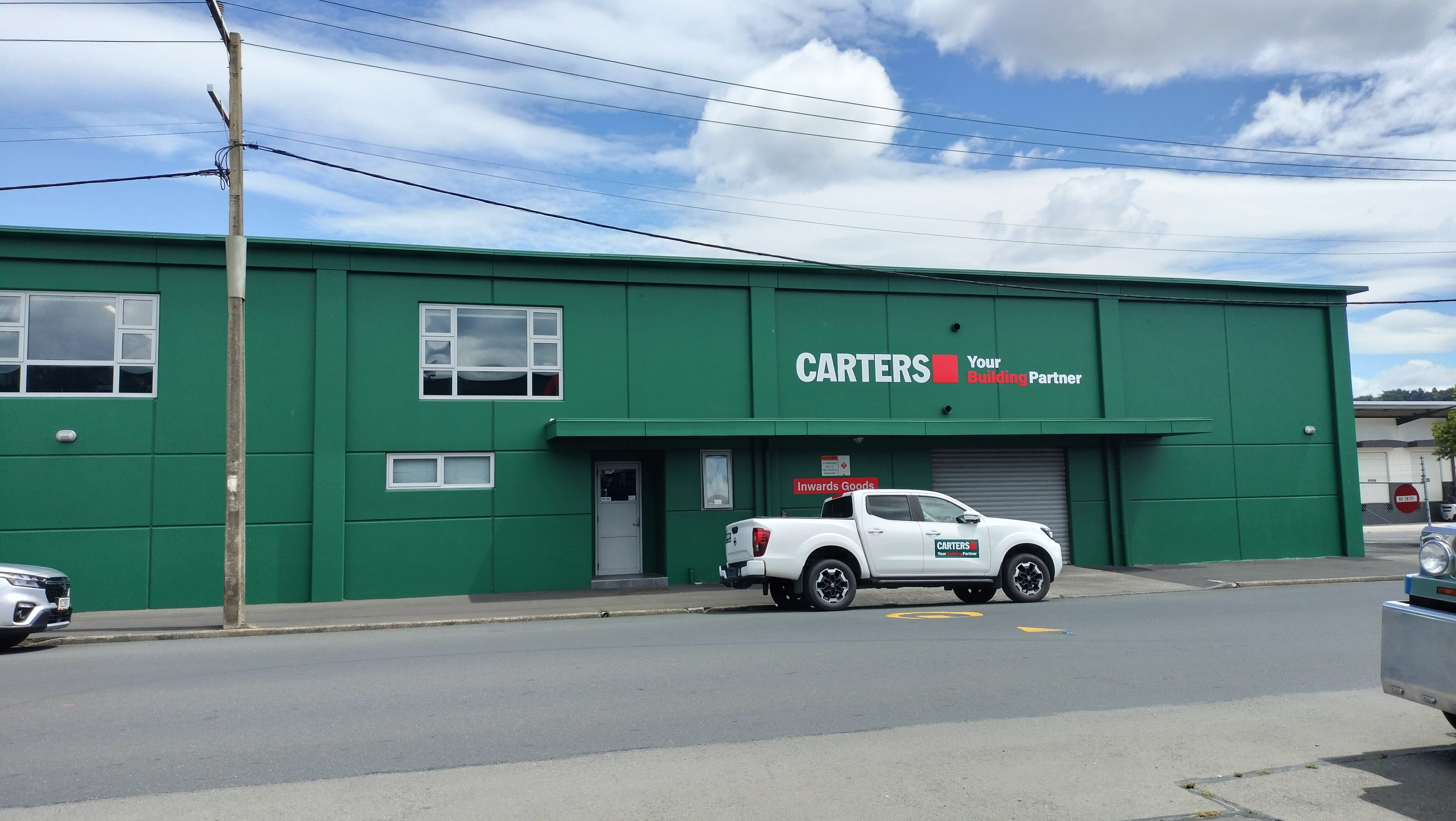
- The CARTERS Building Supplies store in South Dunedin facing Orari Street
- Company type: Building supplies
- Industry: Retail
- Headquarters: New Zealand
- Area served: New Zealand
- Products: Building supplies
- Parent: Carter Holt Harvey
- Website: carters.co.nz

CARTERS Building Supplies is a New Zealand chain of building supplies stores. It has 51 locations, including 12 in Auckland. It is a subsidiary of timber-manufacturing company Carter Holt Harvey.

== History ==
CARTERS traces its origins back to Robert Holt's steam-powered saw mill in Napier Central, which opened in 1869. In 1971, Robert Holts & Sons merged with Carters Consolidated, becoming Carter Holt Holdings. In 1986, Carter Holt Holdings merged with Harvey & Sons to become Carter Holt Harvey.

During the 1990s, Carter Holt Harvey's retail stores rebranded as CARTERS Building Supplies. There were 34 CARTERS stores in 1999. There were 37 CARTERS stores in 2003.

By the 2000s, CARTERS Building Supplies had 50 retail branches and nine manufacturing plants worldwide.
