= Project Crimson =

New Zealand conservation organisation

Project Crimson is a conservation initiative to promote the protection of the pōhutukawa and the rātā which are under threat due to browsing by the introduced common brushtail possum. The vision of the project is to "enable pōhutukawa and rātā to flourish again in their natural habitat as icons in the hearts and minds of all New Zealanders."

== History ==
The initiative for Project Crimson grew out of a Forest Research Institute investigation (1989) into the health of pōhutukawa (Metrosideros excelsa). Scientists discovered that more than 90% of coastal pōhutukawa stands had been eliminated. The tree had entirely disappeared in many areas along the west coast of Northland.

Disturbed by these findings, staff from Northland Department of Conservation and New Zealand Forest Products now Carter Holt Harvey) came up with the idea of creating a community-based project to help pōhutukawa. In 1990 the Project Crimson Trust came to life.

Today Project Crimson is a leading environmental organisation, with support from sponsors and the help of thousands of New Zealanders around the country. These people believe that pōhutukawa, rātā, and many other native trees in New Zealand, are an essential part of who New Zealanders are.

Project Crimson has made impressive progress re-establishing pōhutukawa and rātā nationwide by planting over 300,000 trees, coordinating and supporting a wide range of maintenance activities, scientific research, possum control programmes and public education. From 2011–2015, Project Crimson co-sponsored Living Legends, a reforestation program.

Project Crimson also administers Trees That Count, an environmental movement that aims to both count the number of native trees planted in New Zealand and link funders, businesses and individuals with planting and community groups to plant millions more native trees.

== See also ==
- Conservation in New Zealand
- Common brushtail possum in New Zealand
