= Carter Holt Harvey =

New Zealand building supplies merchant

- Type: Private company
- Industry: Wood products, building supplies
- Predecessor: Alex Harvey Industries, Carter Holt Holdings, New Zealand Forest Products, LJ Fisher & Co. Ltd.
- Founded: 1986
- Founder: Francis Carter; Robert Holt; Alexander Harvey; Louis Jacob Fisher
- Headquarters: Auckland, New Zealand
- Area served: Australasia
- Key people: Graeme Hart
- Revenue: NZ$2 Billion (2015 approx.)
- Owner: Graeme Hart
- Number of employees: 5,000
- Parent: Rank Group Investments Limited
- Divisions: Woodproducts New Zealand, Woodproducts Australia, Carters Building Supplies
- Website: chh.com

Carter Holt Harvey Limited is a privately-owned New Zealand–based company controlled by Rank Group Limited, the corporate vehicle of the country's richest man, Graeme Hart. Based in Auckland, New Zealand, the company has three main divisions: Woodproducts New Zealand and Woodproducts Australia, which are both major Australasian manufacturers of wood-based building products; and Carters Building Supplies, a New Zealand chain of trade-focused building supply stores.

== History (1872–2005) ==
The company traces its history back ultimately to three namesake companies. The first of these was Robert Holt & Sons, a Napier-based company founded in 1921 (though Robert Holt's steam-powered sawmill began operations in 1872). The second was Carter Consolidated, whose sawmill ventures began under Francis Carter near Levin in 1896. Alex Harvey & Sons was the third – with humble beginnings manufacturing milk churns in Auckland.

On 1 April 1969, Alex Harvey & Sons entered a three-way merger with LJ Fisher Co, a steel roof tiles manufacturer, and the New Zealand activities of Australian Consolidated Industries, a diversified conglomerate. The result was Alex Harvey Industries – a sprawling corporation encompassing operations in glass, plastics, steel, wood and paper products. Meanwhile in 1971 the operations of sawmill company Robert Holt & Sons and forestry and wood-products focused Carter Consolidated merged to form a New Zealand timber giant, Carter Holt Holdings. Sir Richard Carter, a great-grandson of Carter Consolidated's founder Francis Carter, led the combined company.

In 1986, Carter Holt Harvey was formed as industrial companies Alex Harvey Industries and Carter Holt Holdings merged, resulting in one of New Zealand's largest companies – which continued to be led by Sir Francis Carter. The glass operations were divested to Australian ACI Glass. The combined company went on, five years later, to acquire the assets of far-larger New Zealand Forest Products, which was "the largest industrial undertaking in New Zealand" managing 200,000 hectares of forest land and annual sales of NZ$200 million in 1981 (nearly NZ$850 million in 2016). This made Carter Holt Harvey, by a comfortable margin, the largest company in New Zealand. However, with CHH burdened by debt from the massive purchase, American International Paper took the opportunity to purchase a 16% stake that year. Their stake gradually increased until a controlling interest of around 50.5% was finally acquired in 1995.

Carter Holt Harvey was listed on the New Zealand Exchange with International Paper as the controlling shareholder until 2005. The company, as of 2005, had over 10,000 staff, forestry assets, diversified wood, pulp and paper manufacturing plants and retail operations across Australasia, as well as several Chinese factories. They formerly were involved in consumer products, with leading positions in the Australasian market for: tissues and paper towels, under brands such as Purex, Sorbent and Handee; nappies, under the Treasures brand; and hygiene products such as Libra pads and Tena incontinence products (under Sancella, a 50–50 joint-venture with SCA). The consumer operations, with 2004 sales of approximately NZ$765 million, was sold to Swedish Svenska Cellulosa Aktiebolaget (SCA) for NZ$1 billion in 2004.

The then fourth-largest listed company in New Zealand by market capitalisation was taken into private hands by Rank Group Investments Limited, controlled by New Zealand's richest man, Graeme Hart. The lock-in offer of NZ$2.50 per share for International Paper's 50.5% stake valued it at around NZ$1.65 billion, with the company valued at approximately NZ$3.5 billion. Carter Holt Harvey's last year in public ownership involved a 77% drop in net profit, which the company blamed on challenging trading conditions such as difficulties in export markets, the strength of the New Zealand dollar and rising freight costs. The sale was completed that year and Carter Holt Harvey entered a new era under private ownership.

== Subsidiary of Rank Group (2005–present) ==
Carter Holt Harvey has been significantly downsized since its reign as New Zealand's largest company ended in the 1990s. The splitting of the company reached its heights under the control of Graeme Hart, after 2005. Barely a year after being taken private, 250,000 hectares of Carter Holt Harvey's 290,000 hectares of forest land was sold to American forest manager Hancock Timber Resource Group (controlled by Canadian investment manager Manulife Financial). The forests, with an estimated book value of NZ$1.5 billion, were located in Northland, Auckland, the Central North Island, the Hawke's Bay and Nelson. Its dairy farming and other properties were also sold separately for approximately NZ$500 million.

In 2014, Carter Holt Harvey Pulp & Paper, encompassing the Australia and New Zealand packaging business, Kinleith Mill, Tasman Mill and the Penrose paper mill, were sold to a Japanese joint-venture between the Oji Paper Company, one of the largest pulp and paper manufacturers in the world, and the Japanese government-backed INCJ. The new company name is Oji Fibre Solutions. Oji already had operations in New Zealand, with investments in Hawke's Bay forestry assets under the PanPac Forests name as far back as 1971 (with over NZ$180 million of investments into PanPac since then, including a major upgrade in 2012). The NZ$1.04 billion sale was announced at the end of April 2014, with the consortium taking full ownership of the assets in December that year.

An initial public offering on the New Zealand Exchange was tipped for Carter Holt Harvey around April 2015, which, at an estimated valuation of NZ$1 billion, would have made it the largest flotation on the NZX that year. However, weakness in the Australian economy prompted Carter Holt Harvey to put its listing plans on hold two months later, with the company's board deciding they would not have "the necessary levels of confidence required" to accurately forecast the earnings outlook of its Woodproducts Australia division, one of its three divisions. The Australian newspaper instead speculated that the real reason the IPO was put on hold was to consider an offer by Australian conglomerate Wesfarmers and its subsidiary, Australasian hardware-chain behemoth Bunnings, for CHH's Carters building supplies chain to consolidate Bunnings' position in building supplies across both consumer and trade markets. A spokesman for Carter Holt Harvey, when approached by Fairfax Media for the Stuff online news site, said that he would not comment on speculation.

In late August 2025, Carter Holt Harvey proposed closing its Eves Valley Sawmill in the Tasman District, potentially affecting 142 jobs. On 4 September, the company confirmed it would close down its Eves Valley sawmill by late November 2025, affecting over 140 jobs. Mayor of Tasman Tim King and Mayor of Nelson Nick Smith had unsuccessfully appealed to the forestry company to delay the closure in order to clear fallen trees and vegetation caused by the Winter 2025 New Zealand floods.

On 16 September, Carter Holy Harvery confirmed plans to close its Tokoroa plywood manufacturing plant, affecting 119 full-time jobs. Carter Holt Harvey intends to import plywood from overseas. On 30 September, the company confirmed it would close its Tokoroa plywood plant in November 2025.

== Operations today ==
As of April 2015, Carter Holt Harvey consists of three divisions – Woodproducts New Zealand and Woodproducts Australia, manufacturers of timber-based building products estimated to have about 50% of the structural timber market in New Zealand and 30% of Australia's – together with heavily trade-focused building supplies chain Carters Building Supplies with approximately 50 outlets operating in New Zealand selling a wide range of products targeted at builders.

The New Zealand Herald, in an April 2015 article, estimates Carter Holt Harvey to have around 5,000 employees and an annual revenue of roughly NZ$2 billion. It operates four milling sites in New Zealand – in Tokoroa, Kawerau, Nelson and Whangārei – as well as two Australian mills, in Yarram, Victoria and Caboolture, Queensland, and nine frame and truss plants. It was, ahead of a planned initial public offering in 2015, valued at potentially NZ$1 billion, which would not put what was formerly New Zealand's largest company in the top 20 by market capitalisation today (the smallest market capitalisation on the Standard & Poor's/New Zealand Exchange 20 index as of 2016 was approximately NZ$1.5 billion).

== Controversies ==
=== Alkyl Ammonium Chloride ===
Alkyl Ammonium Chloride (AAC) was developed by the Forest Research institute as a more environmentally friendly option to the Copper Chrome Arsenate (CCA) which was the preservative typically used to treat timber used in outdoor structures such as decks, sheds, barns, etc. Approved by the Timber Preservation Authority it was used between 1979 and 1985 with Carter Holt Harvey its biggest user. Others were Pinex Timber Products Ltd (a subsidiary of CHH) and Prolog Industries Ltd (the processing branch of the state-owned New Zealand Forestry Corporation). Unfortunately once in use it was found to unsuitable for use with some timber failing within five years. Users of AAC lodged a total of $7.43 million in claims. In November 1992, the New Zealand Government and the timber companies (including CHH) agreed essentially to equally share the costs of settling these claims.

=== Laserframe ===
In 2003 the company was found guilty by the Advertising Standards Complaints Board of misleading advertising over the previous two years over the effectiveness of its Laserframe timber used in building house frames. Laserframe is an untreated kiln-dried, chemical-free timber that the company claimed in a brochure performed similar to H1 treated pine timber. CHH collecting any outstanding brochures and destroyed them.

=== Shadowclad ===
In 2013 the Ministry of Education launched a legal action against a number of cladding manufacturers due to issues with building cladding allowing water to leak into school buildings. Confidential settlements were subsequently reached with Australian manufacturers James Hardie and CSR, but Carter Holt Harvey fought to have most of the claim struck out as it was outside of 10-year limitation period set by the Building Act 2004. When this was rejected by the Supreme Court with costs being awarded against CHH, the case proceeded and is due to be heard in court in 2020. The Ministry wants Carter Holt Harvey to pay all the costs associated with removing and replacing faulty Shadowclad cladding on approximately 800 buildings, with the estimated repair bill reported as being between NZ$1 billion and NZ$1.3b. In 2014 the Fair Go television program found 24 property owners who believed they had been supplied faulty or substandard Shadowclad material. This led to a case action led by lawyer Adina Thorn being filed in the Auckland High Court in 2016. The court action claimed at least NZ$40m in damages on behalf of 117 property owners.

== Brands ==
- Carters Building Supplies
- Futurebuild
- Shadowclad
- Ecoply
- Laserframe
- Pinex
- Handiply
