= 2001 Panmure RSA killings =

New Zealand triple murder

- Location: 36.8996°S 174.8552°E; Panmure, New Zealand
- Date: 8 December 2001; 24 years ago 8:00 a.m. (UTC+13)
- Weapon: Shotgun
- Deaths: 3
- Injuries: 1
- Perpetrator: William Dwane Bell

The 2001 Panmure RSA killings were a triple murder committed on 8 December 2001 at the Panmure RSA, in Auckland, New Zealand. The perpetrator, William Dwane Bell, had been dismissed by the RSA two weeks before for his behavior. He committed the murders while on parole for aggravated robbery in which he almost killed a service station attendant. Bell had more than 100 prior criminal convictions. Bell was given a 30-year minimum non-parole life sentence, at the time the longest minimum non-parole period ever handed down by a New Zealand court.

== Background ==
=== Perpetrator ===
William Dwane Bell (born 1978) grew up in Māngere, a suburb of South Auckland. His father was a gang member who had spent time in prison, a member of the Mongrel Mob, who beat Bell when he was young. He is cousins with former rugby league player, Dean Bell. His father stated that his son had told him he wanted to be a better criminal than him and that he wanted to be in a bigger gang. Bell's mother was a Māori Warden, with family ties to the Black Power gang. His parents often drank and were violent to each other, and eventually separated when he was seven years old, after which Bell began to get into trouble and be involved in petty crime. When Bell was 10, his uncle was convicted of manslaughter for stabbing someone during an alcohol binge in a Māngere home.

==== Previous crimes and imprisonment ====
From ages nine to 17, Bell was a ward of the state and was in and out of a boys' home, this coming after an incident where Bell had stolen his father's car and driven it around town, only to be picked up by police. He began stealing cars, and his crimes soon escalated. He would impersonate security guards and cleaners, and rob elderly homes. Bell was a prostitute at age 14, and would steal the cars of the men he had sex with. His former social worker stated the longest he managed to stay out of trouble was three months. Bell would often impersonate cops and pull over drivers.

In February 1997, aged 19, Bell was turned down for a job at a service station in Māngere because he smoked cannabis. He severely attacked an attendant of the station from behind with a stolen police baton and stole the cash register drawer. The man he attacked surrendered, and told him to take the money, then moved to hide in a toilet cubicle. Bell told him, "It's not the money that matters to me...I don't want to do this, I have to". Bell smashed holes in the door with the police baton. When he left the door, the man escaped by using a chair to get past Bell. Bell was sentenced to five years and nine months in prison for aggravated robbery, the judge saying the robbery was "almost incidental" to the attack, which could have resulted in the attendant's death. After the attack Bell visited the man in hospital, pretending to be a police officer, and threatened him.

==== Parole ====
He served most of the sentence at Auckland Prison, and was released in July 2001 after serving three-and-a-half years. Based on the law at the time, Bell was automatically released after serving two thirds of his sentence. The parole board had no say in the release, other than to set release conditions. The Board imposed five conditions, including seeing a psychologist, alcohol and drug counselling, and to work in a job approved by his probation officer. Bell had more than 100 prior criminal convictions, including theft, fraud, unlawful taking of motor vehicles, burglary, entering with intent, demands with intent to steal, aggravated robbery, presenting a firearm, impersonating police, assault, trespass, traffic and drug offences. An investigation by The New Zealand Herald found Bell's criminal record "cover[ed] six pages of computer printout".

Bell was assigned to the Māngere probation office which was supposed to monitor his compliance, but not one of the five conditions was met. He found a job as part of a work experience program as a barman at the RSA in Panmure but never told his probation officer. He lasted only two weeks before he was fired—other employees considered him abusive, rude, and untrustworthy. The person who fired Bell told him to "piss off" and to not come back. In November of that year, he assaulted a woman, but his probation officer did not start proceedings that could get him returned to prison. Days before the murder Bell stole goods from an engineering firm and cash from a tavern. After both robberies the staff gave descriptions of Bell to the police, including his address, phone number, and car plate number. The police classed these thefts as low priority and he was not arrested.

== Murders ==
Bell and Darnell Kere Tupe, his getaway driver, smoked cannabis and drank through the night before the murders, which occurred at about 8:00 a.m. the following morning. Bell also admitted he was using methamphetamine, and claimed he 'blacked out' while inside the RSA. Two months after he had been fired, on 8 December 2001, he came back to the RSA. Tupe went with him to the club but remained outside. Bell was carrying a shotgun in a guitar case, and was wearing a police shirt at the time of the killings.

He shot three people in the chest before bludgeoning them to death with the butt of the shotgun—the club president, a club member and an employee. All victims were beaten to death except one, who was shot for "trying to be a hero." He seriously injured a fourth—Susan Couch, who was also an employee at the club. Bell laughed at his victims and asked them, "Are you ladies crying?" and "You will tell it was me, won't you?" Couch, who was left bloodied and near death, received brain damage and other permanent injuries in the incident. He spent 45 minutes inside the RSA – 15 minutes robbing the building of $13,000 and 30 minutes beating the victims. He thought he would get $50,000. He took cigarettes and the earnings from the previous night, and went through the wallets of the victims for cash.

After the murders, Bell bought an article of Herald with a headline about his own crimes and kept it in his car. Bell told Tupe shortly after the murders that "We're going down for this... Oh, we're going big time for this one. I just killed three people." Bell was arrested 5 days after the murders at his mother's home.

== Aftermath ==
=== Legal proceedings ===
Bell claimed others were involved in the killings. The person who gave him the shotgun and police shirt, which were not located after the killings, was not charged. Bell's girlfriend gave birth to his child while he was in custody awaiting trial. After he was sentenced, the court stated they were considering a sentence of preventative detention. The officer in charge of the murder inquiry called Bell "the closest thing I have ever seen to a psychopath". The Crown argued that Bell had spent time planning the robbery, and might have gotten the job to scout out the RSA. Bell took the witness stand in his own defence. He lied in contradiction of the evidence more than 64 times.

Bell was jailed for life, with a minimum non-parole period of 33 years initially, 5 years longer than any sentence given out by New Zealand prior. The non-parole period was reduced to 30 years on appeal. He was also sentenced to 13 years of imprisonment for attempted murder, and a concurrent 12 years for aggravated robbery. He was also found guilty for stealing $300 from the tavern. The court heard no remorse from Bell. The Court of Appeal discussed the prospect that Bell will never be released on parole. Psychological reports presented to the court showed that Bell had a high risk of violent reoffences if he was ever released. Bell's sentence was at the time the longest minimum non-parole period ever given out by New Zealand, though it was later surpassed by the sentence given to Brenton Tarrant, the perpetrator of the 2019 Christchurch terrorist attacks, who was sentenced to life without the possibility of parole.

Tupe was sentenced to 12 years for three charges of manslaughter and concurrent terms for one charge of aggravated robbery, and was released on parole in 2012. The Crown maintained that Tupe knew Bell had a gun and that the people in the club would be harmed, and went along with the robbery anyway. Tupe's supporters claimed he was illiterate and could not read or write, and his lawyer claimed that he was conned by Bell.

The Corrections Department conducted an internal inquiry to examine the management of Bell's release by the probation service. The department did not blame Bell for breaching his release conditions; it blamed understaffing, low morale and poor management within the Mangere probation service. It also blamed the police for failing to act when he committed a minor offence a month before the murders. The management of his release conditions was so poor that the department acknowledged 11 separate mistakes which they referred to as 'areas of poor management'.

Susan Couch subsequently tried to sue the Corrections Department for $2 million in damages. Eleven years after the attacks, the Department of Corrections announced it would be offering Susan Couch $300,000 in punitive damages. Couch's lawyer Brian Henry said the payment represented only $10,000 a year for 30 years. Indicating that the next battle would be with ACC, he said: "We still need to get proper compensation. In terms of negligence actions, proper compensation is $10 million." Her compensation was welcomed by victims' rights groups such as the Sensible Sentencing Trust.

=== Imprisonment ===
On 10 December 2007, Bell was stabbed through the eye by fellow inmate Dean Joseph Shepherd. The weapon used was the sharpened corner of a file folder. Bell was treated for his wounds, which included a fractured eye socket and internal bleeding, at Auckland Hospital. Shepherd was serving a life sentence with a 17 1/2 year parole period for a murder in 2004, and was sentenced to an additional ten years in prison for the attack. As this sentence was to be served concurrently with his original sentence, there is no actual difference in his amount of time served. Shepherd attacked him due to the fact that Bell bragged about his crimes and made disparaging comments towards his victims.

Bell was charged in 2017 for watching a pornographic film in his cell. He was awarded $1000 in compensation in 2020 after an illegal strip search of more than 200 prisoners at Auckland Prison in 2016. Bell filed an appeal against the Department of Corrections after he was removed from a kitchen job in the prison. This came after Bell had allegedly planned to take a female guard hostage, which was denied by Bell. During a court hearing for his appeal, he apologized for his crimes, saying that he was "truly sorry" and that his actions were "reprehensible in any society". Bell lost his appeal.
