= Annie Henry =

New Zealand missionary (1879–1971)

- Born: Ann Henry; July 25, 1879; Riverton, Southland, New Zealand
- Died: July 29, 1971 (aged 92); Whakatane, New Zealand
- Other name: Sister Annie
- Education: Presbyterian Women's Training Institute
- Occupations: Missionary and educator

Ann "Annie" Henry (25 July 1879 – 29 July 1971) was a New Zealand educator and Presbyterian missionary who worked among the Māori people.

== Early life and education ==
Ann Henry was born at The Narrows, Riverton, Southland, New Zealand, on 25 July 1879. Her parents were Catherine (née McKillop) and Francis Henry, a sawmiller. Henry was educated at the Oraki School, followed by the Riverton District High School.

She enrolled in the Presbyterian Women's Training Institute in Dunedin in 1915. She started learning Māori in 1916.

== Career ==
Henry was an assistant at the Oraki School from 1895 to 1897. In 1897, In 1897, she moved from Southerland to North Island and lived with her married brother. There, she did church-based youth work and taught Sunday school. She became the first matron of the Presbyterian Church's Manunui Māori Boys' Agricultural College near Taumarunui in 1913. In this capacity, she also taught a class for the day school. However, she resigned due to illness after a year in the position.

In 1915, Henry turned down an offer to join the staff of a Presbyterian mission in North India so that she could continue her studies at the Presbyterian Women's Training Institute, training to become a deaconess. On 24 November 1916, she was ordained a deaconess at St John's Church, Wellington. Henry joined the staff of the Māori Mission Committee of the Presbyterian Church of New Zealand in December 1916. She became known as Sister Annie.

The Māori Mission Committee sent Henry to work with the Tūhoe in Ruatāhuna in February 1917 when she was 37 years old. The church had just begun pastoral work in this part of New Zealand and had also opened a school. However, the area was politically charged at the time. Henry was undeterred and taught school to Māori for eighteen months before a cabin was built for the school. In addition to teaching up to seventy Māori children, aged five to seventeen, Henry also established a night school for adults.

Because Ruatāhuna was very isolated, Henry often performed the services of a dentist, doctor, midwife, lawyer, carpenter, plumber, and social worker in the isolated community. In 1918, the help start a mission school in Maungapōhatu. She became a justice of the peace in 1929.

In 1937, Henry was awarded the King George VI's Coronation Medal. She retired to Ōhope Beach, New Zealand in 1948, after 32 years of service as a missionary. In 1951, she was made a Member of the Most Excellent Order of the British Empire in the King's Birthday Honours as recognition of her work with the Tūhoe people.

== Personal life ==
Henry was a president and life member of the Ruatahuna Rugby Football Club; she was the first woman in the world to become a president of a rugby club.

Henry never married but adopted two Māori boys; one was partially paralysed from polio at the time, and the other died from tuberculosis in his teens. On 29 July 1971, she died in Whakatane, New Zealand at the age of 92. She was buried at Ruatāhuna.

== Legacy ==
The Sister Annie Henry Scholarship is available to assist with education or training costs for a Māori student directly descended from Reverend John George Laughton or who is of Tūhoe descent.
