= David Henry (businessman) =

Sir David Henry
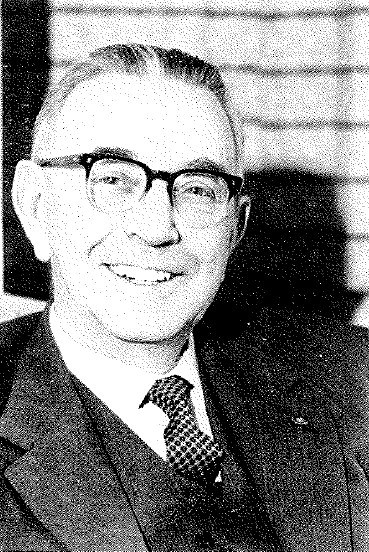
- Born: 24 November 1888; Juniper Green, Midlothian, Scotland
- Died: 20 August 1963 (aged 74); Auckland, New Zealand
- Occupation: Industrialist

Sir David Henry (24 November 1888 – 20 August 1963) was a Scottish-born New Zealand industrialist, company director, and philanthropist.

== Early life and family ==
Henry was born at Juniper Green, Midlothian, Scotland. His father, Robert Henry, was a sawmiller and on leaving school, David Henry worked as a clerk in the Mossy Paper Mill at Colinton while attending night classes in Edinburgh, possibly at Heriot-Watt College.

== Emigration and early years in New Zealand ==
Indifferent health prompted him to emigrate to New Zealand in 1907. He worked for the Government Printer in Wellington for a brief time before moving to Christchurch, where he founded an engineering business. When the business failed he shifted to Auckland to start afresh.

Henry married Mary Castleton Osborne on 28 April 1915 and began working for another engineering and patents company owned by S. Oldfield and D. B. Hutton. By August of the same year, he had bought into the firm, and it was renamed Oldfield & Henry. Within four years he owned the organisation outright and it became known as D. Henry & Co. Henry expanded the business into a profitable small-scale plumbing manufacturer and supplier.

== Timber industry ==
Henry's New Zealand cousins (see Henry family) had been involved in the fledgling timbermilling industry since their arrival in New Zealand in the 1870s, and in 1936 he was to play a pivotal role in the consolidation of the New Zealand timber industry through his involvement in the merger of his extended family's milling business with the afforestation company, New Zealand Perpetual Forests (a large bond selling company that had established 150,000 acres (61,000 ha) of timber plantations, but had gone bankrupt). Henry struck a hard bargain in purchasing the New Zealand Perpetual Forests assets and was made the chairman and managing director of the new company for his efforts. This new company was New Zealand Forest Products, which remained New Zealand's largest industrial concern and largest company until the privatisation of Telecom New Zealand in the 1990s.

In assuming the role of New Zealand's pre-eminent industrialist, Henry was concerned with developing the future utilisation of the company's forests. Sawmill technology for handling Pinus radiata, and the commercial manufacture of pulp and paper from this species, was reasonably undeveloped worldwide. He travelled extensively throughout the United States and Europe to find the newest processing technology and fought a protracted battle with the New Zealand government to overcome bureaucracy. He was successful in convincing the government of the benefits of the company's industrialisation and in 1941 opened the first large-scale sawmill and insulating board plant at Penrose, Auckland.

Henry also clashed with the government over its plans to nationalise the New Zealand timber industry to create an integrated state sector forest and timber manufacturing company. This battle continued until the election of a National Government in 1949.

In 1943, Henry chose a mill site near Tokoroa, near the company's forest plantations. He built Kinleith Mill (after a paper mill in Scotland), which was to become famous as New Zealand's largest industrial processing complex. Kinleith manufactured the first commercially produced kraft pulp in New Zealand in 1953. It was the culmination of 17 years of effort by Henry.

In the 1954 Queen's Birthday Honours, Henry was appointed a Knight Bachelor in recognition of his role as chairman and managing director of New Zealand Forest Products.

== Other activities ==
Henry was very involved in the community. He used his business success in Auckland to become increasingly involved with a wide range of organisations, including the Rotary Club of Auckland, the Boy Scouts' Association, the Young Men's Christian Association (YMCA), the Auckland Manufacturers' Association (eventually becoming national president), and he sat as an elected councillor on the Auckland City Council (from 1931 until 1933). He was also well known for his philanthropy, endowing a forestry scholarship bearing his name in 1956 to provide overseas training for employees of New Zealand Forest Products. He also established a substantial trust for the Auckland Presbyterian Orphanages and Social Service Association (now known as Presbyterian Support).

== Later life ==
Henry's wife died in 1954, but the next year, now aged 67, he married Dorothy May Osborne, the younger sister of his first wife. However, he showed no interest in retiring as chairman of New Zealand Forest Products, and continued to battle the government over industry licensing, while beginning to display increasingly erratic behaviour. This is evidenced by his conduct in 1958 when he encouraged the British pulp and paper giant Bowater Paper Corporation to make an unsuccessful takeover for New Zealand Forest Products, and he began to make uncharacteristically rash statements to the national press. Despite being ill with a heart condition, Henry continued to be active at the company, holding many meetings at his Remuera residence, during which he was known to lash out verbally.

In his history of New Zealand Forest Products, titled A Hundred Million Trees, Brian Healy said "Sir David Henry lacked warmth and humour in his working relations and tended to be abrupt and demanding with his subordinates. Yet he was a fluent and persuasive speaker whose self-assurance, business acumen and tenacity were vital in enabling New Zealand Forest Products to overcome enormous barriers and to develop into one of the country's largest industrial enterprises."

In 2014, Henry was posthumously inducted into the New Zealand Business Hall of Fame.
