= Murder of Lyn Fleming =

2025 killing of New Zealand police officer during a vehicle-ramming attack

- Location: Nelson, New Zealand
- Date: 1 January 2025; 22 months ago 02:10 am (NZST)
- Attack type: Vehicle ramming
- Weapon: Honda Odyssey
- Deaths: 1 (Lyn Fleming)
- Injuries: 4
- Perpetrator: Hayden Tasker

In the early hours of 1 January 2025, Senior Sergeant Lyn Fleming of the New Zealand Police was killed after Hayden Tasker deliberately drove a Honda Odyssey into two police officers in a central Nelson carpark during New Year's Eve celebrations. Fleming sustained unsurvivable injuries and died in hospital. A second officer, Senior Sergeant Adam Ramsay, was seriously injured but recovered. Two members of the public were also injured in the attack. Fleming became the first female police officer in New Zealand to be killed in the line of duty.

Tasker, a 32-year-old homeless man who had been living in his car in Motueka, was arrested at the scene. He told police following his arrest that he had been motivated by anger towards the Police, and had intended to provoke a police chase in which he planned to kill himself. He was charged with murder, attempted murder, and a range of other offences. After pleading not guilty to murder and arguing the killing was a suicide attempt rather than intentional homicide, Tasker was convicted of murder by a unanimous jury verdict on 18 May 2026 following a three-week trial at the Christchurch High Court. On 24 July 2026, he was sentenced to life imprisonment with a minimum non-parole period of 22 years.

Fleming's death attracted widespread public mourning across New Zealand, with hundreds attending her funeral at Nelson's Trafalgar Centre on 16 January 2025 and a permanent stone memorial established outside Nelson's Central Police Station in September 2025.

== Background ==
Prior to the incident, Hayden Donald Jason Tasker had been homeless, unemployed and living in his Honda Odyssey in Motueka, about half an hour away from Nelson. At the time, Tasker was suffering from depression and had several prior convictions including using a car to ram a man in a wheelchair following an altercation.

== The incident ==
On 31 December 2024, Tasker had bought several boxes of wine and socialised with his friends, before driving to central Nelson's Buxton Square. Tasker arrived in Nelson after 12:26 am on 1 January 2025 and spent the next hour and a half driving around the city centre, parking at various locations. Shortly before the incident, he parked at the Buxton Street carpark, which was busy due to the New Year's Eve celebration. During that time, Tasker drank half a bottle of wine while ruminating over his life and circumstances. At the time, Tasker's driving license was suspended.

Shortly before 2:09 am on 1 January, he noticed that there were two police cars parked nearby. At the time, Senior Sergeants Lyn Fleming and Adam Ramsay were chatting with their colleague in the driver's seat of the police car behind. Tasker drove his vehicle towards the victims and struck them, causing two members of the public between Tasker and the police officers to jump out of the way. Fleming was dragged by Tasker's car and thrown 20 metres forward, sustaining several injuries including an unsurvivable head injury. Ramsay was thrown 8 metres forward, sustaining several serious injuries including suffered a dislocated shoulder, a badly gashed head and numerous cuts and abrasions.

Tasker then turned his car 180 degrees and rammed the second police car, causing concussion injuries to the driver inside. The car was shunted forward, striking a member of the public who was attempting to give first aid to Ramsay. She sustained two fractured bones in her right arm that required the insertion of screws and two plates. Fleming was admitted to Nelson Hospital where she was placed on life support. She subsequently succumbed to her injuries in the presence of her family. Ramsay suffered serious injuries during the incident but recovered.

== Investigation and legal proceedings ==
Following the vehicle ramming incident, Tasker was arrested. While in police custody, he told a detective that he had intended to ram into the police officers because he was motivated by anger towards the New Zealand Police. Tasker also acknowledged that he was drunk at the time and had intended to commit suicide by leading the police on a car chase. When Tasker was told that he would be charged with murder, the defendant acknowledged that he was aware about the damage that speeding cars could inflict and that he knew that the Police would have a presence at Buxton Square that night.

=== Arraignment ===
On 3 January 2025, a 32-year old man, subsequently identified as Hayden Tasker, appeared in the Nelson District Court on eight charges including murder, attempted murder, assault using a vehicle as a weapon, dangerous driving and driving while disqualified. Justice Richard Russell imposed an interim name suppression to allow the accused to contact his family and remanded the defendant into custody until a scheduled appearance at the Nelson High Court on 14 February. Russell also issued an order prohibiting all media including social media from publishing video footage of the incident.

In late February 2025, Tasker appeared at the High Court in Blenheim where he pleaded guilty to two charges of drink driving and driving while disqualified. He pleaded not guilty to six charges including the murder of Fleming, the attempted murder of Senior Sergeant Adam Ramsay, causing grievous bodily harm with reckless disregard to safety, and three charges of dangerous driving. Name suppression for Tasker lapsed during a pre-trial hearing at the Wellington High Court on 8 August 2025. On 17 October, Tasker's case was transferred to Christchurch, with a tentative trial date being set for May 2026.

=== Trial ===
Hayden Tasker's murder trial commenced at the Christchurch High Court on 4 May 2026 before Justice Cameron Mander and a jury. The trial is expected to last for three weeks, with 40 witnesses giving testimony. The Crown was represented by Tasman Crown Solicitor Mark O'Donoghue while the defendant was represented by Josh Lucas. During opening arguments, O'Donoghue outlined the summary of the facts, and presented CCTV footage and images of the alleged murder. O'Donoghue said that a drunk Tasker deliberately drove his Honda Odyssey into Senior Sergeants Lyn Fleming and Adam Ramsay in a Nelson carpark while under the influence of alcohol. He subsequently rammed a police vehicle, injuring a third police officer and a civilian giving first aid to Ramsay. Following his arrest, Tasker told a detective that his attack on the victims had been motivated by anger towards the Police. O'Donoughue said the Crown would argue that "the whole event was an act of completely senseless and pointless violence carried out by the defendant because he was angry at the police."

Lucas said the defence would argue that Tasker's attack on the victims was a suicide attempt intended to provoke a police chase. He argued that the defendant was guilty of manslaughter because he did not intend to murder Fleming. He said that Tasker accepted responsibility for causing Fleming's death. Lucas also asked jurors to review all evidence including Tasker's personal circumstances, what he told the Police following his arrest, the length of time between when he began to drive towards the police car and the moment of impact, and the effect of alcohol intoxication on his mind. During the first day of trial, Tasker also pleaded guilty to three charges of dangerous driving.

During the trial, the Crown presented video footage of Tasker's vehicle ramming attacks on the Police officers, testimony from Fleming's colleagues Senior Sergeant Ramsay, Constables Jude Yeoman, Molly Inman, Samantha Batchelor and hospital doctor Gillian Hood (who examined Fleming) over a two-week period. On 14 May, the court also watched Tasker's video interview with the Police following his arrest. Tasker was distraught upon learning of Fleming's death and expressed remorse at his actions. The defendant also attributed his actions to his anger at his previous experience with the Police and excessive alcohol drinking prior to the incident.

The defence and Crown delivered their closing arguments on 15 May. Tasker's defence lawyer Marcus Zintl argued that Tasker's actions on 1 January 2025 were a "suicide attempt gone wrong." He said that Tasker had been depressed after his girlfriend had left him and wanted to rejoin his late father in the afterlife. Zintl said that the defendant had not intended to murder Fleming and wound Ramsay but had intended to lead Police on a car chase where he would crash his car and kill himself. Crown prosecutor Jackson Webber argued that Tasker had intended to kill Fleming and her colleagues by driving his vehicle into them. Webber argued that Tasker was motivated by his anger towards the Police and had made deliberate steps before and during the vehicle ramming attack to identify his victims and cause maximum harm.

On 18 May, Justice Mander summed up the case and the jury began deliberations at 12:22 pm. After three and a half hours of deliberation, the jury unanimously convicted Tasker of murdering Fleming and "intentionally causing grievous bodily harm" to Ramsay. Several relatives and colleagues of Fleming attending the court hearing. Mander remanded the defendant into custody for sentencing in July 2026. Police Commissioner Richard Chambers and Tasman District commander Superintendent Tracey Thompson welcomed the verdict and paid tribute to Fleming and her family.

On 24 July 2026, Tasker was sentenced to life imprisonment with a non-parole period of 22 years at the Nelson High Court. Fleming's husband, daughter, son and colleague Senior Sergeant Adam Ramsay read victim impact statements.

== Aftermath ==
=== Memorials ===
On 2 January 2025, Police Commissioner Richard Chambers issued a statement condemning Fleming's killing as "tragic and senseless." He also described her as the first policewoman in New Zealand to be killed in the line of duty. On 3 January, several people paid tribute to Fleming by laying flowers, balloons, handwritten cards, and letters at the base of the flagpole outside the Nelson Police Station. The New Zealand flag was also hung at half-mast. Pastor Jennifer Macleod of Stoke Baptist Church also delivered a bouquet of flowers on behalf of local Baptist congregations in honor of Fleming. On 16 January, hundreds of people including Police Commissioner Chambers attended Fleming's funeral at Nelson's Trafalgar Centre.

On 29 September, Fleming's family established a stone memorial to her in a garden outside Nelson's Central Police Station. Chambers and Police Minister Mark Mitchell attended the memorial's dedication ceremony and laid wreaths.

=== Internal police investigation ===
On 22 June 2025, The New Zealand Herald reported that an internal police investigation found that 50 Police employees had illegally accessed a file relating to the death of Fleming that was stored in an intelligence database called the National Intelligence Application (NIA). The NIA stores sensitive information about incidents, offending and the public. A Police spokesperson confirmed that the 50 individuals had been issued with warnings, with New Zealand Police Association president Chris Cahill describing the data breach as a serious offense that could lead to disciplinary actions including dismissal.
