= Trevor Henry =

New Zealand judge

The Honourable Sir Trevor Henry
- Henry in 1971
- Born: Trevor Ernest Henry; 9 May 1902; Thames, New Zealand
- Died: 20 June 2007 (aged 105)
- Occupations: Lawyer, jurist

Sir Trevor Ernest Henry (9 May 1902 – 20 June 2007) was a New Zealand jurist and member of the well known Henry family.

== Biography ==
Henry was born in Thames in 1902, and was the son of John and Edith Henry. He was the eldest of the three sons who include Jack Henry and Clive Henry. He studied law at Auckland University College before being admitted as a barrister in 1925.

He was one of the founding partners of the Auckland law firm, Wilson Henry (now Hesketh Henry), and was involved in several high-profile cases during the 1930s, including the murder trial of Eric Mareo and Dove-Myer Robinson's landmark lawsuit to prevent the Auckland Drainage Board discharging sewage in Auckland Harbour.

Henry was raised to the bench of the Supreme Court of New Zealand in 1955, the same year that his son, John Henry was raised to the bar. He was appointed a Knight Bachelor in the 1970 New Year Honours for his services to the New Zealand justice system. In 1984, Sir Trevor and John made New Zealand legal history as the first father and son to sit together on a High Court bench in New Zealand. Sir Trevor was also a Justice of the Fijian Court of Appeal and served a term as the Chief Justice of Tonga.

Henry continued his family's long history of community involvement, sitting on the 1936 New Zealand Olympic Games selection committee, serving three terms on the New Zealand Parole Board and chairing the New Zealand War Pensions Appeal Board.

Henry's career was described as "meteoric." His inauguration ceremony at the Supreme Court in 1955 saw one of the largest-ever turnouts of Auckland society and Sir George Finlay remarked that Henry possessed a "wiseness, a sense of duty and an experience of men and affairs which should light his path to the end that justice should truly be done."

Sir Duncan McMullin described Henry as a humble man, devoid of pretence, with a meticulous approach to surveying evidence and a sharp mind to analyse issues at the heart of any case. He remained active in New Zealand law well into his 90s, offering opinions and publishing articles on a range of legally related subjects.

Following Henry's death in 2007 at the age of 105, the New Zealand Herald published allegations that he had secretly fathered two children with a young Māori woman from Te Arawa in the 1920s.
