= Kinleith Mill =

Paper mill in New Zealand

Coordinates: 38.276192°S 175.884333°E

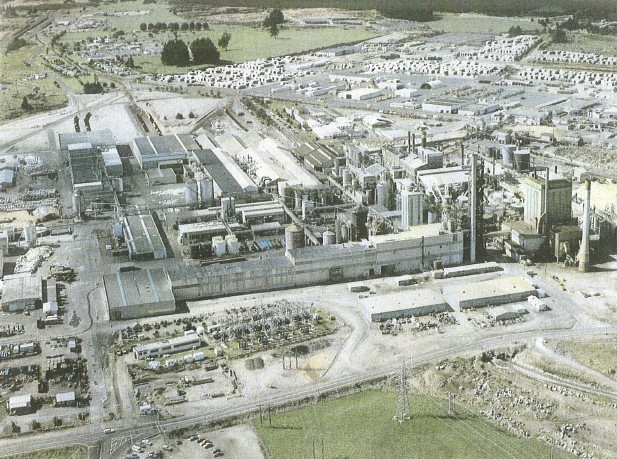
An aerial view of the mill

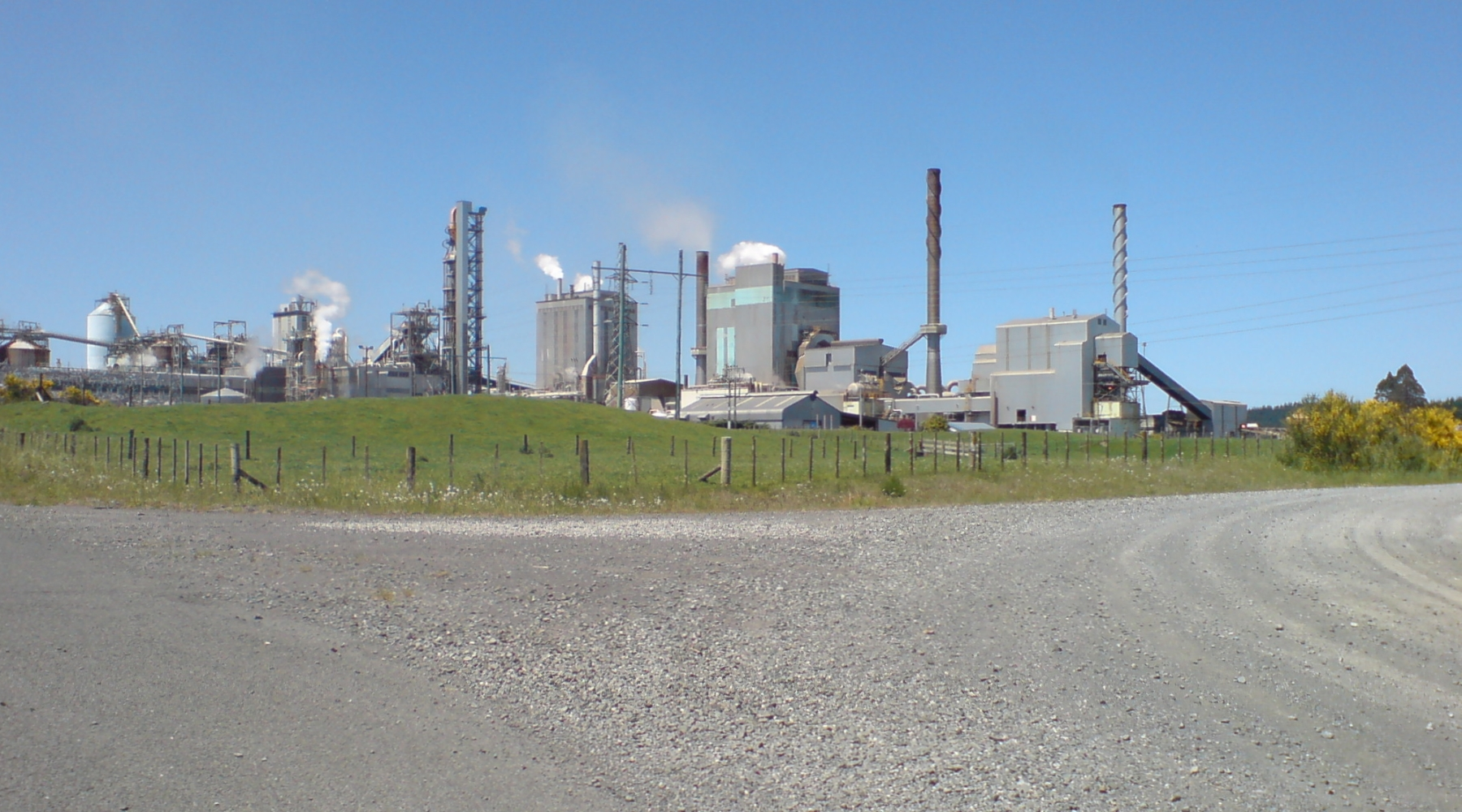
The mill from the northeast

The Kinleith Mill is a pulp and paper plant located at Kinleith, Tokoroa, New Zealand. It was one of eight mills operating in the New Zealand pulp and paper industry. It is currently operated by Oji Fibre Solutions, formerly Carter Holt Harvey.

== Description ==
Kinleith Mill produced approximately 330,000 tonnes of paper grades per year, plus 265,000 tonnes of predominantly bleached pulp. The site boasts its own cogeneration plant, which burns wood waste and generates approximately 35 MW used on-site, with the rest of the required electricity mainly coming via a 110 kV transmission line direct from the nearby Arapuni Dam. The mill was Tokoroa’s largest employer, with some 450 employees and 280 additional subcontractors, mainly from ABB. A cycleway path runs between the mill and Tokoroa township.

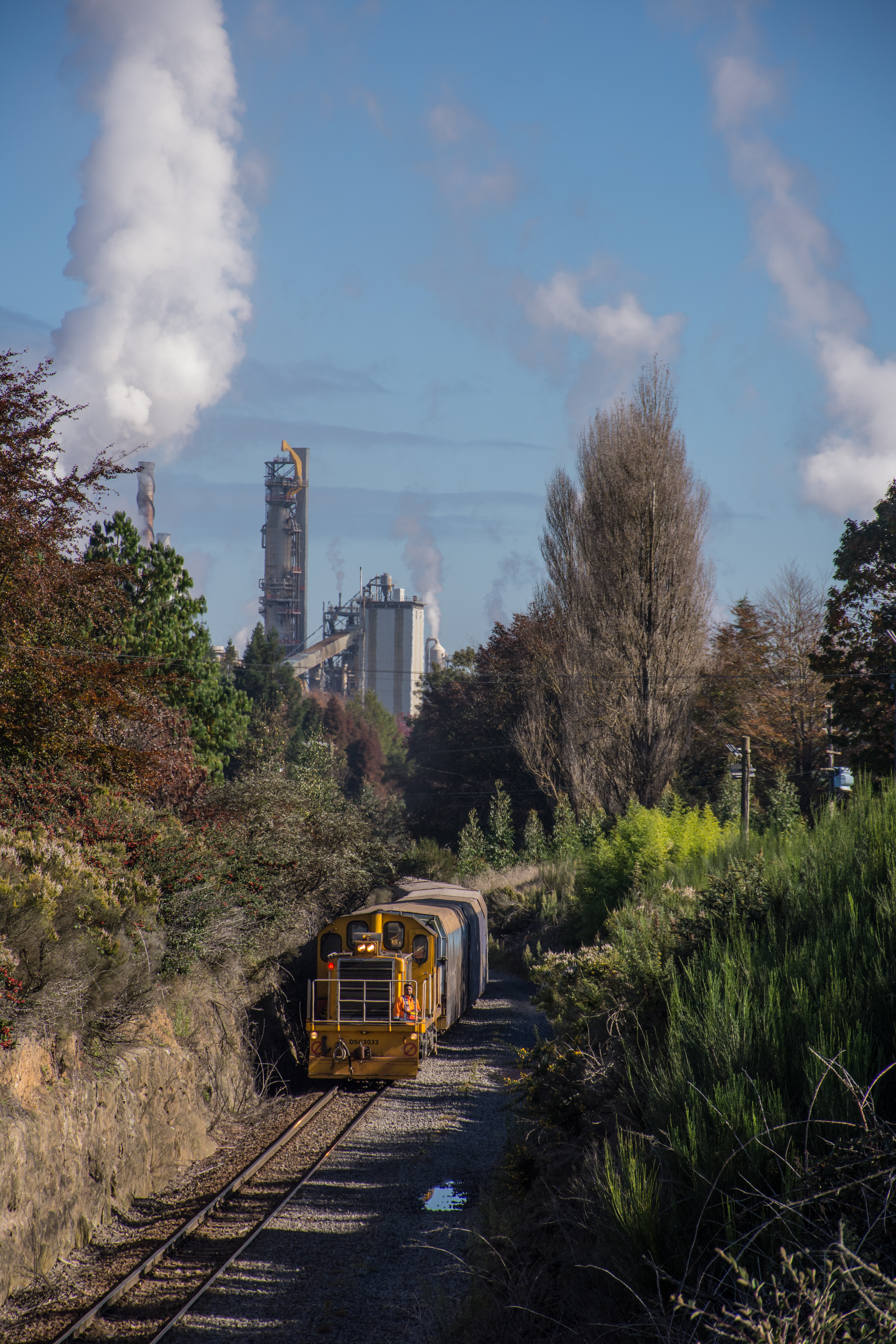
NZR DSG shunting at Kinleith in 2021

== History ==
Kinleith was established as a sawmill community and dedicated timber forests serving it were planted from 1924 on, with a heavy duty railway reaching the facility in 1952 (Kinleith Branch line), and the mill itself commencing production in 1953. Tokoroa was at that time mainly a service/dormitory town to the mill facilities. Kinleith was built by New Zealand Forest Products and named for the Kinleith paper mills, on the Water of Leith, Scotland by Sir David Henry KBE, who worked there during his papermaking apprenticeship.

Paper production at the mill ceased in June 2025. The mill continues to produce bleached kraft pulp.

== See also ==
- List of paper mills
