= New Zealand Forest Products =

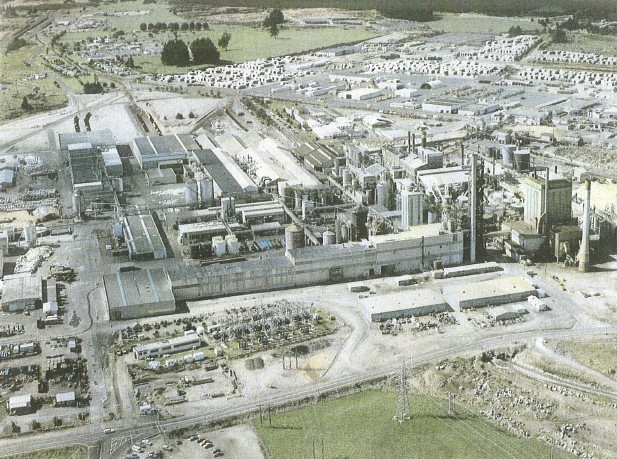
Kinleith Mill and Processing Complex, Tokoroa, New Zealand

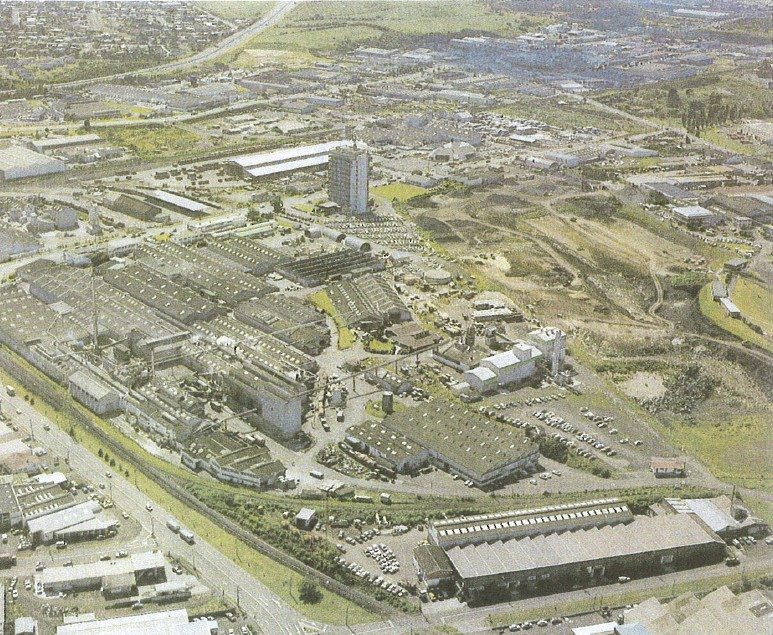
New Zealand Forest Products Headquarters, Penrose, Auckland

New Zealand Forest Products (NZFP) was New Zealand's largest industrial company from its creation (following the consolidation of the New Zealand timbermilling sector) in 1936 until the privatisation of state-owned Telecom New Zealand in 1990. Sir David Henry KBE was responsible for negotiations on behalf of the Henry Family that saw the creation of New Zealand Forest Products.

The company continued to expand following World War II and was a large-scale manufacturer of structural timber, board and other packaging products. Following the construction of the Kinleith Mill at Tokoroa in 1953, NZFP became a substantial manufacturer of pulp and paper products. The company owned some 250,000 hectares of forestry plantations, with a further 300,000 hectares under long-term Crown leases from the New Zealand Government.

The company and its tenacious managing director were consumed by a long, drawn-out battle to create a vertically integrated forestry and pulp and paper industry based in the North Island. Throughout the 1940s and 50s, he clashed frequently with government agencies designed to limit the licensing of specific industries. He also had to face the hard realities of potential competition from Tasman Pulp and Paper (today, a division of Norwegian forestry major, Norske Skog) which, with A. R. [Pat] Entrican, head of the State Forestry Service and considerable government financial backing, was positioned to take advantage of new international markets in the post-war economy.

Despite this government-backed obstacle, the company developed all of its own infrastructure independently inclusive of company housing, water supply, railway lines, transport networks, and plant machinery. The result of this was that, by the 1960s, New Zealand Forest Products was the largest single manufacturer in New Zealand - producing cardboard, kraft paper, wrappings, and multiwall bags, to newsprint, fine printing papers, stationery, and specialty papers.

Beyond the fact of being New Zealand's largest private enterprise, New Zealand Forest Products had a profound effect on New Zealand's post-war economy which had verged on economic depression by replacing the once mighty British Empire-developed triumvirate of wool, meat and dairy, with a forestry industry that was focussed on providing product not only to well-established Commonwealth export markets but to then-new emerging New Zealand trade destinations such as Japan and the United States. This marked a significant change in the psyche of post-war New Zealand industry.

By the time of his death, Sir David Henry had put New Zealand on the map in terms of a viable, vertically integrated, forest-based operation. As the company magazine, March of Pine [1951-64], suggested after the opening of the Kinleith processing complex:

“What has been happening at Kinleith may well prove as important in the long run to New Zealand‟s economy as the first shipment of refrigerated beef from Dunedin in 1882.”

Another member of the family, Jack Henry, was the Director of the Kinleith Division and the Forests Division. He pioneered new methods in silviculture which saw the company achieve major efficiency gains that turned NZFP into one of the largest forestry companies globally. He was the last Henry to sit on the board of NZFP retiring in 1986 as corporate raiders circled.

Throughout the 1970s and early 1980s, NZFP was the target of several takeover attempts including a joint bid by Goodman Fielder (the Australian/New Zealand flour miller) and Watties Industries (the New Zealand canned food manufacturer) given its strong asset profile. This joint bid failed, but was soon followed by another unsuccessful $1.9 billion bid by Fletcher Challenge in 1985. NZFP was successful in defending itself against these local corporations, however, in 1986 the company was finally acquired by the Australian conglomerate Elders Resources, a subsidiary of Elders IXL (the vehicle of Australian corporate raider, John Elliot). Elliot mounted a successful hostile takeover that valued the company at $3.0 billion and the company became known post-acquisition as Elders NZFP Corporation.

Following a bitter battle over the bid, the Henry family agreed to sell to the Australian raider and this effectively ended the Henry family's 110 years of involvement in New Zealand industry.

The assets of NZFP continue to operate to this day. Following the collapse of Elders NZFP in 1988 following the stockmarket crash, the assets were purchased by Carter Holt Harvey (CHH), another smaller New Zealand forestry company. The purchase of the NZFP assets tripled the size of CHH and boosted its revenues by 60% to top NZ$7.0 billion, then a record for any New Zealand company.

== See also ==
- Forestry in New Zealand
- Project Crimson, a conservation programme set up and initially sponsored by New Zealand Forest Products
