= List of cases of the Court of Appeal of New Zealand =

This is a list of the substantive decisions of the Court of Appeal of New Zealand. It is organised in order of the year the case was handed down.

== 1927 ==
- Tataurangi Tairuakena v Mua Carr

== 1933 ==
- Lundberg v Royal Exchange Assurance Corp

== 1938 ==
- Hunter v Hunter

== 1955 ==
- McMahon v Gilberd and Co Ltd

== 1959 ==
- Truth (NZ) Ltd v Avery

== 1968 ==
- Carey v Hastie

== 1970 ==
- News Media Ownership v Findlay

== 1973 ==
- Buhrer v Tweedie
- Stephenson v Waite Tileman Limited

== 1975 ==
- Cook Islands Shipping Co Ltd v Colson Builders Ltd
- Caruthers v Whitaker
- Hunt v Wilson

== 1976 ==
- Frampton v McCully
- G v Auckland Hospital Board
- Mall Finance & Investment Co Ltd v Slater

== 1978 ==
- Dundee Farm Ltd v Bambury Holdings Ltd

== 1979 ==
- Starlight Enterprises Ltd v Lapco Enterprises Ltd

== 1980 ==
- Brown v Brown
- Boulder Consolidated Ltd v Tangaere
- Provost Developments Ltd v Collingwood Towers Ltd

== 1981 ==
- Connor v Pukerau Store Ltd

== 1982 ==
- A M Bisley & Co Ltd v Thompson

== 1983 ==
- Allied Finance and Investments v Haddow & Co

== 1985 ==
- Aotearoa International Ltd v Scancarriers A/S
- Engineering Plastics Ltd v J Mercer & Sons Ltd
- Powierza v Daley
- Westpac Banking Corporation v Savin

== 1986 ==
- Moreton v Montrose Ltd (in liq)
- Nichols v Jessup
- Scott v Wise

== 1987 ==
- Mayfair Ltd v Pears
- Cuff v Broadlands Finance Ltd
- Oliver v Bradley

== 1988 ==
- SGS (New Zealand) Ltd v Quirke Export Ltd
- General Finance Acceptance Ltd v Melrose

== 1989 ==
- Burbery Mortgage Finance & Savings Ltd v Hindsbank Holdings Ltd
- Green v Matheson
- Cross v Aurora Group Ltd
- Gillies v Keogh
- Morrow & Benjamin Ltd v Whittington
- Re Chase

== 1990 ==
- Brown & Doherty Ltd v Whangarei County Council
- Whelan v Waitaki Meats Ltd
- Sharplin v Henderson
- Shattock v Devlin

== 1991 ==
- Jenkins v NZI Finance Ltd
- MacIndoe v Mainzeal Group Ltd

== 1992 ==
- Bowkett v Action Finance Ltd

== 1993 ==
- McElroy Milne v Commercial Electronics Ltd

== 1994 ==
- Holloway v Attorney-General
- Bradley West Solicitors Nominee Co Ltd v Keeman

== 1995 ==
- Fleming v Securities Commission
- Barrett v IBC International Ltd

== 1996 ==
- ASB Bank Ltd v Harlick
- Sew Hoy & Sons Ltd (in liq and in rec) v Coopers & Lybrand

== 1997 ==
- Gore District Council v Power Co Ltd
- Garrett v A-G
- Rawlinson v Rice

== 1998 ==
- Tertiary Institutes Allied Staff Assoc Inc v Tahana
- Fortex Group Ltd (in Receivership and Liquidation) v MacIntosh
- Gray v M
- Morrison v Upper Hutt City Council
- Globe Holdings v Floratos
- Young v New Bay Holdings Ltd

== 1999 ==
- Cox & Coxon Ltd v Leipst
- Boat Park Ltd v Hutchinson
- Donnelly v Westpac Banking Corp
- Riddell v Porteous

== 2000 ==
- Autex Industries Ltd v Auckland City Council
- Karelrybflot AO v Udovenko
- R M Turton & Co (in liq) v Kerslake & Partners

== 2001 ==
- Fletcher Aluminium Ltd v O'Sullivan
- Haines v Carter

== 2002 ==
- A v Bottrill
- Midland Metals Overseas Pte Ltd v The Christchurch Press Co Ltd

== 2003 ==
- Compcorp Ltd v Force Entertainment Ltd
- Yu v T & P Developments Ltd

== 2004 ==
- Frost & Sutcliffe v Tuiara
- Pharmacy Care Systems Ltd v Attorney-General
- Ansley v Prospectus Nominees Unlimited
- Liebherr Export AG v Ellison Trading Ltd

== 2005 ==
- Rolls-Royce New Zealand Ltd v Carter Holt Harvey Ltd
- Pratt Contractors Ltd v Transit New Zealand
- Ballance Agri-Nutrients (Kapuni) Ltd v The Gama Foundation

== 2006 ==
- Vickery v McLean
