= Gray v M =

- Court: Court of Appeal of New Zealand
- Full case name: Robin John Genge Gray v M (suppressed)
- Decided: 23 February 1998
- Citation: [1998] 2 NZLR 161
- Transcript: Court of Appeal judgment

Court membership
- Judges sitting: Gault P, Keith J, Henry, Blanchard J, Tipping J

Keywords
- negligence

Gray v M [1998] 2 NZLR 161 is a cited case in New Zealand regarding the legal defence of absolute privilege of matters raised in judicial proceedings that were subsequently used in defamation claims in tort.

== Background ==
Mrs M lodged a complaint with the Methodist church about the "inappropriate behavior" of its Timaru Minister Robin J G Gray.

The matter was subsequently resolved via mediation between the parties, which amongst other things, Gray agreed to give the complainant a written apology, which he duly did.

However, the complaint later led to Gray being "removed from the list of Presbyters", culminating in Gray losing his job as Chaplin at the Nelson Hospital.

However, despite the fact that he had previously apologized in writing to M for his conduct, he nonetheless sued her for defamation.

Facing defending a potentially long and expensive defamation action, she applied, successfully in the District Court, that laying a complaint with the Complaints Committee was an absolute privilege under the Defamation Act, akin to making a similar statement in Court, and Grays action was struck out.

On appeal, the High Court agreed as well.

== Held ==
The Court of Appeal, sitting as a bench, disagreed, saying the Complaints Committee was not judicial, and Gray's defamation claim was reinstated.
