= Cox & Coxon Ltd v Leipst =

- Court: Court of Appeal of New Zealand
- Full case name: COX & COXON LIMITED Appellant v BARRY FREDERICK LEIPST and BARBARA JEAN LEIPST Respondent
- Decided: 24 November 1998
- Citation: [1999] 2 NZLR 15; (1999) 6 NZBLC 102,666; (1998) 8 TCLR 516
- Transcript: Court of Appeal judgment

Court membership
- Judges sitting: Richardson P, Gault J, Henry J, Blanchard J, Tipping J

Cox & Coxon Ltd v Leipst [1999] 2 NZLR 15; (1999) 6 NZBLC 102,666; (1998) 8 TCLR 516 is a cited case in New Zealand regarding the award of damages for "expectation loss" under the Fair Trading Act 1986.

== Background ==
In 1995, the Leipst's purchased a 5-acre lifestyle block in Hastings that contained a pear orchard. Prior to purchasing the property, the real estate agents Cox and Coxon Ltd misrepresented the 1994 pear sales as being $12,000, when it was later discovered to be only $8,801.16.

As a result, the Leipsts sued the real estate agents for damages under the Fair Trading Act, for "expected damages" of $27,233.64, which was calculated being the annual loss of $3,198.84 for 20 years, using a discount rate of 10%.

The District Court made no award of damages, but on appeal to the High Court, they were awarded $16,000.

Cox and Coxon appealed, claiming that expectation losses under contract could not be awarded under the Fair Trading Act, and instead could only calculate damages under tort. The FTA did not clarify the issue.

== Held ==
The court, sitting as a bench of 5, ruled that under the FTA, damages could only be awarded under tort, and not under contract.
