= Fortex Group Ltd (in Receivership and Liquidation) v MacIntosh =

- Court: Court of Appeal of New Zealand
- Full case name: Fortex Group Ltd (in Receivership and Liquidation) v MacIntosh
- Decided: 30 March 1998
- Citation: [1998] 3 NZLR 171

Court membership
- Judges sitting: Gault, Henry J, Keith, Blanchard J, Tipping

Fortex Group Ltd (in Receivership and Liquidation) v MacIntosh [1998] 3 NZLR 171 is a cited case in New Zealand regarding constructive trusts.
