= Garrett v A-G =

- Court: Court of Appeal of New Zealand
- Full case name: Judith Garrett v A-G
- Decided: 19 December 1996
- Citation: [1997] 2 NZLR 332

Court membership
- Judges sitting: Richardson P, Gault J, Henry J, Keith J, Blanchard J

Keywords
- negligence

Garrett v A-G [1997] 2 NZLR 332 is a cited case in New Zealand regarding claims in tort for misfeasance in public office.

== Background ==
Judith Garrett had lodged a complaint with the police that she had been raped by several off duty police officers.

Later, when the police declined to prosecute the officers, Garrett sued the police for malfeasance for refusing to prosecute

== Held ==
Garrett's claim was dismissed.
