= Karelrybflot AO v Udovenko =

- Court: Court of Appeal of New Zealand
- Full case name: AO KARELRYBFLOT v Appellant Arthur UDOVENKO and others Respondents
- Decided: 17 December 1999
- Citation: [2000] 2 NZLR 24
- Transcript: Court of Appeal judgment

Court membership
- Judges sitting: Richardson P, Gault J, Keith J, Blanchard J, Tipping J

Karelrybflot AO v Udovenko [2000] 2 NZLR 24 is a cited case in New Zealand confirming that the doctrine of frustration can cover employment contracts.
