= Globe Holdings v Floratos =

- Court: Court of Appeal of New Zealand
- Full case name: Globe Holdings v Floratos
- Decided: 12 May 1998
- Citation: [1998] 3 NZLR 331

Court membership
- Judges sitting: Richardson P, Gault J, Thomas J, Keith J, Blanchard J

Globe Holdings v Floratos [1998] 3 NZLR 331 is a cited case in New Zealand regarding where a condition in conditional contract is for the sole benefit of one party, the condition can be unilaterally waived by that party.

== Background ==
The parties entered into a conditional sale agreement involving a block of apartments, requiring the obtaining a subdivision consent within 60 days to the purchasers satisfaction. The contract had a clause allowing either party to cancel the contract prior to a condition being waived, or fulfilled.

Ultimately, the subdivision consent was not obtained, but the purchaser notified the vendor that they had now waived this condition unilaterally, and that they should now treat the contract as now being unconditional.

The vendor response was that the condition was a benefit of both parties, and as such, was not able to be waived unilaterally.

== Held ==
The Court of Appeal sitting as a bench of 5, applying Hawker v Vickers [1991] 1 NZLR 399 ruled that the purchasers were legally able to waive the condition, as it was solely for the benefit of the purchaser. Blandchard J stated: " It has to be remembered that we are at this point concerned with a situation in which it is to be accepted that there is no substantive benefit to [the vendors]." and "The court must reach a view on whether both parties are intended to have the benefit of a contingent condition by applying ordinary principles of contractual construction, examining the contract document as a whole in its factual matrix".
