= Vickery v McLean =

- Court: Court of Appeal of New Zealand
- Full case name: Ross Harold Vickery v Thomas McLean, Christopher John Smale, and Geoffrey Keith Phillips
- Decided: 7 November 2000
- Citation: [2006] NZAR 481
- Transcript: Court of Appeal judgment

Court membership
- Judges sitting: Gault J, Thomas J, Keith J, Blanchard J, Tipping

Keywords
- negligence

Vickery v McLean [2006] NZAR 481 is a cited case in New Zealand regarding claims in defamation and the defence of free speech.

== Background ==
Harold Vickery was concerned that there may have been criminal activity at the Papakura District Council when it contracted out its water services, so much so that he had lodged complaints with both the Ombudsman Office and the Serious Fraud Office.

Vickery then sent The New Zealand Herald a letter claiming that "there was serious enough circumstantial evidence to suggest criminal irregularity may have taken place" at the PDC by these council employees, who were not elected council officials.

The Council employees in reply sued Vickery for defamation, and he used the claim of qualified privilege as a defence, as outlined in Lange.

== Held ==
The Court of Appeal limited the defence of qualified privilege, as outlined in Lange, to elected officials, such as councillors, MPs, and mayors, and not to unelected public officials, as were the plaintiffs here. Thus Vickery's defamation defence was dismissed.
