= Neilson v A-G =

- Court: Court of Appeal of New Zealand
- Full case name: Neilson v A-G
- Decided: 3 May 2001 Richardson P, Gault, Thomas, Keith, McGrath JJ
- Citation: [2001] 3 NZLR 433

Court membership
- Judges sitting: Richardson P, Gault J, Thomas J, Keith J, McGrath J

Keywords
- negligence

Neilson v A-G [2001] 3 NZLR 433 is a cited case in New Zealand regarding suing under the Bill of Rights Act for unlawful arrest.

== Background ==
After Neilson was dismissed from his job as a private investigator, he subsequently won a personal grievance in the Employment Court against his former employer.

Part of the employers unsuccessful defence was that Neilson had pocketed some fees from one of their clients.

Eight days after losing in the Employment Court, the employer lodged a complaint with the police regarding the misappropriated money.

The police, without doing a proper investigation, and despite evidence that would suggest that no crime had occurred, a police office arrested Neilson without first obtaining an arrest warrant.

Later, Neilson was discharged without conviction, and sued the police for wrongful arrest, and was awarded $10,000 in damages.

The police appealed.

== Held ==
The court ruled that the arrest was still illegal, but did reduce the damages award to $5,000.
