= Gore District Council v Power Co Ltd =

- Court: Court of Appeal of New Zealand
- Full case name: Gore District Council v Power Co Ltd
- Decided: 4 November 1996
- Citation: [1997] 1 NZLR 537

Court membership
- Judges sitting: Richardson P, McKay J, Henry, Keith, Blanchard J

Keywords
- Illegal contracts, validation

Gore District Council v Power Co Ltd [1997] 1 NZLR 537 is a cited case in New Zealand that confirms that a contract can be for an indefinite term, as well as confirming that a contract does not become frustrated simply due to it being a bad bargain.

== Background ==
In 1927, the Gore Borough Council transferred its local power supply assets to the Southland Electric Power Board (later to become Power Co), in return for SEPB supplying all the council's electricity for one penny a unit "for all time hereafter."

THE Board further agrees to supply to the Council all electric energy required by the Council for street lamps, pumping water, sewage or other material, Town Hall and Borough Offices, Town Clock, all municipal buildings, including Fire Brigade Station, Electric-power Station, Public Library and other buildings under the control and management of the Council and all electric energy required by the Council for its own use in any municipal undertaking at the price of one penny per unit payable quarterly on the last days of March, June, September and December in each year,...

THE provisions of this Deed shall be binding upon the Board and Council for all time hereafter.

The Gore Borough Council has become the Gore District Council, and SEPB has become TPC, "The Power Company".

With no mechanism for increasing the price to allow for inflation, etc., this contract subsequently became somewhat onerous for Power Co, as by 1994 the unit price of electricity had increased by 770%. On top of that, the council's power usage had also increased by 840%.

Faced with an annual loss of $188,000 in supplying the council's electricity under the contract, in 1995 Power Co gave the council 15 months' notice of termination of the contract, citing that the ability to terminate the contract was implied, and failing that, that the contract was frustrated due to the change of circumstances that has occurred since 1927, including the substantial inflation.

== Decision ==
The court ruled that a contract for an indefinite term whilst may be rare, is not forbidden under contract law. The court also denied the contract was frustrated as contracts are not frustrated just because they turn out to be bad bargains.
