= Morrison v Upper Hutt City Council =

- Court: Court of Appeal of New Zealand
- Full case name: Morrison v Upper Hutt City Council
- Decided: 18 February 1998
- Citation: [1998] 2 NZLR 331, [1998] NZRMA 224

Court membership
- Judges sitting: Richardson P, Gault J, Tipping J

Keywords
- negligence

Morrison v Upper Hutt City Council [1998] 2 NZLR 331, [1998] NZRMA 224 is a cited case in New Zealand regarding negligence claims against the government.

== Background ==
After first granting Morrison a building consent to build a new town house, the UHCC later withdrew the consent after discovering it had been issued outside of the District Plan.

Morrison appealed successfully to the Environment Court, and subsequently sought damages from the council.

== Held ==
The court ruled that a council had no liability for making what is a quasi judicial decision.
