= Midland Metals Overseas Pte Ltd v The Christchurch Press Co Ltd =

- Court: Court of Appeal of New Zealand
- Full case name: Midland Metals Overseas Pte Limited v The Christchurch Press Company Limited, Orion New Zealand Limited, TL Scott, SJJ Hirsch, Wellington Newspapers Limited, and The New Zealand Press Association
- Decided: 24 October 2001
- Citation: [2002] 2 NZLR 289
- Transcript: Court of Appeal judgment

Court membership
- Judges sitting: Gault P, Tipping J, Blanchard J, Tipping J, McGrath J

Midland Metals Overseas Pte Ltd v The Christchurch Press Co Ltd [2002] 2 NZLR 289 is a cited case in New Zealand regarding owing a duty of care in negligence.
