= Westpac Banking Corporation v Savin =

- Court: Court of Appeal of New Zealand
- Full case name: Westpac Banking Corporation v Savin
- Decided: 3 October 1985
- Citation: [1985] 2 NZLR 41

Court membership
- Judges sitting: Richardson J, McMullin J, Sir Clifford Richmond

Westpac Banking Corporation v Savin [1985] 2 NZLR 41 is a cited case regarding the general principles of constructive trusts.

== Background ==
Aquamarine was in the business of selling boats, and sold a boat "on behalf" for Savin. After they sold the boat, Aquamarine deposited the cheque in their overdrawn company bank account at Westpac, with the intention of issuing a cheque to Savin for the sale proceeds.

However, before a cheque could be issued to Savin from the company bank account, Aquamarine was placed into liquidation, resulting in Savin not getting paid for his boat.

Unable to sue an insolvent company for his monies, he sued Westpac instead, claiming the cheque banked was on constructive trust on behalf of Savin.

The question at hand was whether Westpac had any knowledge that the cheque was in trust for Savin.

== Held ==
After considering the fact that not only did the Westpac branch manager knew that Aquamarine sold boats on behalf of people, that he also knew that 3 out of 4 boats were sold on such a basis, the Court of Appeal ruled that Westpac had knowledge of the money being on trust, and so were accountable to Savin for the sale proceeds.
