= Autex Industries Ltd v Auckland City Council =

- Court: Court of Appeal of New Zealand
- Full case name: Autex Industries Ltd v Auckland City Council
- Citation: [2000] NZAR 324

Court membership
- Judges sitting: Keith J, Blanchard J

Keywords
- negligence

Autex Industries Ltd v Auckland City Council [2000] NZAR 324 is a cited case in New Zealand regarding the development of nuisance claims under Rylands v Fletcher.

== Background ==
As the result of an Auckland City Council water main breaking, the resulting flood destroyed $206,708.17 of stock owned by Autex.

After the council refused to reimburse them for the damaged stock, they sued the council. But instead of filing for the normal negligence claim, which the council would have surely defended, they instead brought a Rylands v Fletcher claim, where there is strict liability, i.e. no defence is normally arguable.

As it was a strict liability claim, they made an application for summary judgment.

== Held ==
The Court of Appeal ruled that it was inappropriate to grant summary judgment here, and referred the matter back to court for argument.

== Legal Significance ==
At the time, this case was expected to clarify the development of Rylands v Fletcher case law in New Zealand. However, the parties settled the claim before a court made a further ruling on this. This matter was clarified 2 years later in Hamilton v Papakura District Council.
