= Nichols v Jessup =

- Court: Court of Appeal of New Zealand
- Full case name: Paul Anthony Nichols v Eileen Noella Jessup
- Decided: 26 September 1986
- Citation: [1986] 1 NZLR 226
- Transcript: High Court judgment Court of Appeal judgment

Court membership
- Judges sitting: Cooke P, Somers J, McMullin J

Keywords
- unconscionable bargain

Nichols v Jessup [1986] 1 NZLR 226, is a New Zealand case regarding unconscionable bargains, and it set the threshold for an unconscionable bargain is that the stronger party did not have to have actual knowledge of the other party having a disability (to negotiate), but merely that the stronger party should have had suspicions that the other party had a disability.

== Background ==
Eileen Jessup, a nurse in her 60s, owned a house on Great North Road in Auckland, that had a full street frontage. Paul Nichols, a manager of a real estate agency in Australia, owned the house on the back section, and its sole access was a 3.66 metre easement over Nichols property. This means of access was deemed to be unsatisfactory to Nichols. To rectify this Nichols proposed to Jessup that they amalgamate both their respective driveways, which would improve the value of the back property by $45,000 due to the fact that the improved access would let Nichols to build up to 12 flats on that property, and reduce the value of front property by $3,000 as the widened driveway would now come up to inches of the side of her house.

For reasons not stated, Jessup agreed to this, although later at trial Jessup was referred to by the judge as “unintelligent and muddle-headed” and “ignorant about property matters”.

Matters come to a head when Nichol's solicitors noticed that Jessup had signed the agreement under her maiden name, and they resent the contract to her to be signed under her married name, for which she refused to do.

Later Jessup, presumably unhappy at the one sided agreement, applied to the courts to have the whole agreement set aside.

== Decision ==
The Court of Appeal of New Zealand ruled that as Nichols was a real estate agent, they ought to have known of the substantial imbalance in the transaction.

Cooke P stated

the plaintiff, although not setting out intentionally to exploit [the defendant], must have realised at some stage that there was a real imbalance in the arrangement. Or … at the very least, especially in the light of his work as a real estate agent, he ought to have realised that there was such an imbalance.

As a footnote, this decision was just made after the Privy Council had made the ruling in O'Connor v Hart which also involved unconscionable bargains, and which reversed a previous ruling of McMullins J, who was a judge at this trial.
