= Burbery Mortgage Finance & Savings Ltd v Hindsbank Holdings Ltd =

Legal case

- Court: Court of Appeal of New Zealand
- Full case name: Burbery Mortgage Finance & Savings Ltd v Hindsbank Holdings Ltd
- Decided: 21 November 1988
- Citation: [1989] 1 NZLR 356
- Transcript: Court of Appeal judgment

Court membership
- Judges sitting: Cooke P, Richardson J, McMullin J

Keywords
- Promissory estoppel

Burbery Mortgage Finance & Savings Ltd v Hindsbank Holdings Ltd [1989] 1 NZLR 356 is a cited case in New Zealand regarding promissory estoppel, and the ground that their needs to be a pre existing legal relationship before this doctrine applies. This case also is notable that it extends legal relationships to include creditors to the same entity.

== Background ==
Hindsbank owned a farm in South Canterbury, with Equiticorp holding a first ranking debenture over the company assets. Burbery had a first ranking charge over the farm machinery of Hindsbank.

Hindsbank got into financial difficulty, resulting Burbery trying to repossess the farm equipment, as well as Equiticorp appointing a receiver.

The receiver discussed over the phone with Burbery, that as he was instructed to sell the farm, he asked Burbery to not repossess the farm machinery. Burbery alleged that the receiver also said that this was to maximise the sale proceeds for the farm, although the receiver denied ever saying this.

As a result of this conversation, Burbery instructed their repossession agent to cease seizing the machinery.

However, unknown to Burbery at the time, the receiver had discovered that they could legally seize the machinery under a Warrant to Distrain for unpaid rent. The receiver subsequently sold the machinery and refused to pay any of the sale proceeds to Burbery.

A less than impressed Burbery sued Hindsbank to recover the sale proceeds.

== Held ==
The Court of Appeal extended the necessary pre existing legal relationship to include parties that were creditors to the same company. The court ruled that the only reasonable conclusion of the conversation that it would not affect Burbery's security and that if Hindsbank wanted to distrain the farm machinery, equity would require that Hindsbank give Burbery reasonable notice of this. As a result, promissory estoppel applied, and the receiver was ordered to pay to Burbery the proceeds from the machinery sale.
