= Frost & Sutcliffe v Tuiara =

- Court: Court of Appeal of New Zealand
- Full case name: FROST & SUTCLIFFE Appellant v TURUA TUIARA AND MEREAINA TUIARA Respondents
- Decided: 27 November 2003
- Citation: [2004] 1 NZLR 782; (2003) 10 TCLR 912
- Transcript: Court of Appeal judgment

Court membership
- Judges sitting: Gault P, Tipping J, McGrath J

Frost & Sutcliffe v Tuiara [2004] 1 NZLR 782; (2003) 10 TCLR 912 is a cited case in New Zealand regarding whether a party owes another party concurrent duties in contract and in tort.

== Background ==
Frost & Sutcliffe were a law firm that represented the Tuiara's in a buyback agreement on their Mangere home, for which they also acted as the legal representatives of the finance company involved. The law firm gave them the following legal advice:

19 March 1999

Re: Sale of your property at 21 Ashley Avenue, Mangere. To Richmond Thornby Holdings Limited and Repurchase.

You have been asked to sell your property to Richmond Thornby Holdings Limited which will pay you only $8,000.00 now and will resell it to you in 6 weeks.

We note our advices to you as to our concern at advising family as regards to transaction of this type. This is especially the case when their own home is placed at risk. My initial advice to you would be "don't".

I record however, that you have decided that you do wish to proceed with the arrangement.

The effect of registration of the sale will mean that you have lost your home if anything goes wrong. As advised, if for any reason Richmond Thornby Holdings Limited can't get a release of the mortgage it will take on the property, effectively you will have lost your house and have to start again. You will have a right against the security the Company grants but this would be likely to be of no value.

We note that at this stage you have satisfied yourselves the Company will be in a position to repurchase the property from you in 6 weeks.

To summarise, our advice simply is it is better not to proceed with the transaction. We note however that you wish to assist your family, and you have done so in the full knowledge that the transaction is a financial risk to you and you may suffer financially in the event the Company being unable to complete the resale of the house for you.

We note we have strongly recommended you consult an independent Solicitor in respect of the matter but you have declined to so.

Yours faithfully

FROST & SUTCLIFFE

At trial, the Tuiara's denied they had ever received this letter, but the court disagreed with them on this.

The Tuiara's eventually followed through on the deal, accepting an $8,000 payment in return for temporarily transferring title of their house to a 3rd party.

Soon after entering into the agreement, the finance company involved went into liquidation, resulting in the Tuiara's losing their house.

They later sued the law firm for breach of contract, as well as for negligence in tort, with the Tuiara's claiming that Sutcliffe had encouraged them to proceed on the deal.

The High Court ruled that whilst they did not breach their fiduciary duty owed under contract, they did breach the duty of care they owed in tort.

== Held ==
The Court of Appeal allowed the law firms appeal.
