= R M Turton & Co (in liq) v Kerslake & Partners =

- Court: Court of Appeal of New Zealand
- Full case name: R M TURTON & CO LIMITED (IN LIQUIDATION) Appellant v KERSLAKE & PARTNERS Respondent
- Decided: 2 December 1999
- Citation: [2000] 3 NZLR 406
- Transcript: Court of Appeal judgment

Court membership
- Judges sitting: Henry J, Thomas J, Keith J

Keywords
- negligence

R M Turton & Co (in liq) v Kerslake & Partners [2000] 3 NZLR 406 is a cited case in New Zealand regarding negligence claims in situations where a claim can be in both tort and contract.

== Background ==
R M Turton were the head contractor for the Southland Health Board's building of the Queenstown hospital.

The SHB appointed the engineering firm Kerslake and Partners as the engineers for the build.

Turton installed the air conditioning units that Kerslake specified for the build, however these units were not powerful enough for the building, requiring Turton to spend $75,000 to fix.

Turton sued SHB for breach of contract, and Kerslake in tort.

== Held ==
The court dismissed Turton's appeal, as Kerslake did not owe Turton any duty of care.
