= Scott v Wise =

- Court: Court of Appeal of New Zealand
- Full case name: John Fraser Scott v Wise
- Decided: 28 May 1986
- Citation: [1986] 2 NZLR 484

Court membership
- Judges sitting: Richardson P Somers J, Tompkins

Keywords
- negligence

Scott v Wise [1986] 2 NZLR 484 is a cited case in New Zealand regarding the enforceability of contracts entered into by someone suffering from a mental defect.

== Background ==
John Scott in 1978, aged in his 70s entered into some complex transactions regarding the ownership of his farm in Wanganui, which involved a sale to a trust at government valuation, with a 100% finance, which also included an option to purchase to his grandson Cyril Wise.

However, it was soon discovered that Mr Scott was suffering from senile dementia, and was subsequently admitted to Lake Alice Hospital as a mental patient, invalidating the transfer of the farm.

Further complicating matters, in 1928 he fathered a child named Elizabeth Bryers, whose mother soon after married another man, whom legally adopted Elizabeth. The adoption would 50 years later cause her to lose any legal right to be a beneficiary in her father's estate. Wise also married, and had several other daughters. He later re-established a relationship with Elizabeth, so much so, that he named her a beneficiary in a will made in 1972. When he redid his will in 1975, she was not named there, presumably because that his solicitor was unaware of the existence of an illegitimate daughter. This resulted in Bryers missing out, unless she got the transfer set aside by the court. To do this, she got her husband Rex Bryers to be appointed as Wise's guardian ad litem and he applied to the court to set aside the transactions.

== Held ==
Although the Court found that Wise lacked mental capacity at the time of the transfer, as the terms were deemed fair, the Court refused to set aside the transaction.
