= Powierza v Daley =

- Court: Court of Appeal of New Zealand
- Full case name: Powierza v Daley
- Decided: 27 September 1985
- Citation: [1985] 1 NZLR 558
- Transcript: Court of Appeal judgment

Court membership
- Judges sitting: Cooke P, McMullin J, Somers J

Keywords
- counteroffer

Powierza v Daley [1985] 1 NZLR 558 is an important New Zealand case involving where an inquiry about an offer, is just that, or whether instead it is a counteroffer. The legal distinction between the two is important, as an "inquiry" still leaves the original offer live (and still subject to acceptance), whereas a "counteroffer" cancels the previous offer.

== Background ==
The two parties were negotiating a sale of a property. Daley's, the sellers, sent to Powierza, via their real estate agent Lee, a sale agreement for $405,000, with a condition of a $40,000 deposit. Poweirza agreed to the sale price, but changed the deposit on the sale agreement to $20,000.

The vendor had just changed the deposit from $20,000 to $40,000, and the purchaser changed the deposit back to $20,000, signing the sales agreement, and got Lee to return it to the vendor to consider, which the vendor refused to accept. Nor was his next inquiry of splitting the deposit into 2 instalments accepted either.

Powierza then amended the sales agreement deposit back to the original $40,000, signed it, and returned it to Daley. But by then, the property had been sold elsewhere as Daley had received a higher offer of $435,000 from a 3rd party.

Powierza considered the original sales offer was still open for his acceptance, and sued the Daley's. Daley's responded claiming his alterations to the contract were a counteroffer, voiding the original offer.

== Held ==
The Court of Appeal upheld that the alteration in the sales agreement was merely an inquiry, and not a counter offer, making the original contract still enforceable against the vendor. Cooke J stated "The line between rejecting an offer and merely inquiring as to a possible variation can be a fine one, but the basic test is the effect on a reasonable person in the shoes of the offerer".
