= Rawlinson v Rice =

New Zealand legal case

- Court: Court of Appeal of New Zealand
- Full case name: Rawlinson v Rice
- Decided: 19 March 1997
- Citation: [1997] 2 NZLR 651, [1998] 1 NZLR 454

Court membership
- Judges sitting: McKay, Barker and Tipping J

Keywords
- negligence

Rawlinson v Rice [1997] 2 NZLR 651, [1998] 1 NZLR 454 is a cited case in New Zealand regarding claims in tort for misfeasance in public office.

== Background ==
District Court Judge Rice issued a non molestation order against Rawlinson, against his protestations that the law required for him to be living with the complainant, which he wasn't. Rawlinson was later proven right on court, and had the order quashed.

Rawlinson then sued the judge for misfeasance. At the time, whilst High Court judges had immunity for such conduct, District Court judges did not.

== Held ==
The Court of Appeal sitting as a bench of five, said he was not legally barred from pursuing his claim.

Footnote: Section 119 of the District Court Act now extends immunity to District Court judges as well.
