= Provost Developments Ltd v Collingwood Towers Ltd =

- Court: Court of Appeal of New Zealand
- Full case name: Provost Developments Ltd v Collingwood Towers Ltd
- Decided: 31 October 1980
- Citation: [1980] 2 NZLR 205

Court membership
- Judges sitting: Woodhouse P, Cooke J, Richardson J

Provost Developments Ltd v Collingwood Towers Ltd [1980] 2 NZLR 205 is a cited case in New Zealand regarding "subject to solicitor's approval" clauses in conditional contracts.

== Background ==
Collingwood entered into a sale agreement with Provost for several adjoining properties. The sale was conditional on "subject to my solicitor's approval". Due to receiving a better offer, the vendor's solicitor refused to give their approval, and based on this, the vendor claimed the contract had come to an end.

Provost filed in court for specific performance for Collingwood to honour the sale agreement.

== Held ==
The Court said that the solicitor approval could only be withheld for legal issues, not for where a better offer was received. Richardson J stated "..it seems to me that the role of solicitor under clause 19 was to be limited accordingly to consideration of what might be loosely but conveniently be termed the legal implications of the transaction, including in that description the form of the agreement, its validity, and the burden of the commitments entered into thereafter".
