= Mayfair Ltd v Pears =

- Court: Court of Appeal of New Zealand
- Full case name: Mayfair Ltd v Brian George Pears
- Citation: [1987] 1 NZLR 459
- Transcript: High Court judgment

Court membership
- Judges sitting: Cooke P, McMullin J, Somers J

Keywords
- negligence

Mayfair Ltd v Pears [1987] 1 NZLR 459 is a cited case in New Zealand regarding whether or not strict liability applies in tort.

== Background ==
Brian Pears parked his car on a parking deck of a Wellington building, without the permission of the building's owner, Mayfair Limited, effectively trespassing. Later that night, for unknown reasons, the car mysteriously exploded, starting a fire in the building, causing $8,475.81 in damage to the building.

Pears refused to pay for the damage.

== Held ==
The court ruled that whilst there was strict liability in tort for the escape of fire, the court limited this to cases where the escape of fire was from land or buildings. Here the escape of fire was merely from a chattel (a car), meaning there was no strict liability for the resulting damage, and as the fire was not attributed to any negligence on his part, Mayfair's claim was struck out.
