= Sew Hoy & Sons Ltd (in liq and in rec) v Coopers & Lybrand =

- Court: Court of Appeal of New Zealand
- Full case name: Sew Hoy & Sons Ltd (in liq and in rec) v Coopers & Lybrand
- Decided: 8 December 1995
- Citation: [1996] 1 NZLR 392

Court membership
- Judges sitting: McKay, Henry J, Thomas J

Sew Hoy & Sons Ltd (in liq and in rec) v Coopers & Lybrand [1996] 1 NZLR 392 is a cited case regarding causation.

== Background ==
Sew Hoy & Sons Ltd was placed into receivership, and the receivers later discovered that the auditors Coopers and Lybrand had missed that the stock had been overvalued in its reports.

As result, the receivers argued that the auditors not detecting this, prevented the company from taking considering options such as taking "mitigating steps", or ceasing trading.

The receivers sued the auditors.

== Held ==
The court dismissed the claim, as the plaintiff had not established causation for the loss.
