= Boat Park Ltd v Hutchinson =

- Court: Court Appeal of New Zealand
- Full case name: Boat Park Limited (First Appellant) & Licaka Holdings Limited (Second Appellant) v Hutchinson & Findlay (Respondents)
- Decided: 2 November 1998
- Citation: [1999] 2 NZLR 74

Court membership
- Judges sitting: Henry J, Thomas J, Tipping J

Boat Park Ltd v Hutchinson [1999] 2 NZLR 74 is a cited case in New Zealand regarding what evidence is admissible when considering the express terms of a contract. It follows the English case of the Financial Services Compensation Scheme.

== Background ==
Boat Park purchased a Whangarei property from Hutchinson for $1,050,000, with Hutchinson agreeing to provide vendor finance of up to 75 percent of "a registered valuer's valuation of the property".

When it came to settlement, Boat Park supplied a valuation report that gave a valuation of $3.5 million, more than triple the purchase price, which if accepted, would have effectively meant vendor finance of 100%.

The valuation was based not on the current market value of the property, but on the estimated value after it had been subdivided and developed, but this valuation made no account for any risk for such matters if the council consents were not approved or that the sections did not sell.

Hutchinson refused to accept this valuation as a fair market value, and initially refused to settle, but reluctantly agreed to settle, and later successfully referred the dispute to the High Court.

Boat Park appealed the High Court judgment.

== Held ==
At the appeal, evidence was given that less than three months after the valuer assessed the property at $3.5 million, they supplied a valuation of $1.135 million for the very same property to another party.

Boat Parks appeal was dismissed. The court applied the Investors Compensation Scheme principles, and held that the purchaser's valuation was not a fair valuation.
