= Tertiary Institutes Allied Staff Assoc Inc v Tahana =

- Court: Court of Appeal of New Zealand
- Full case name: Tertiary Institutes Allied Staff Association Incorporated v Tahana
- Decided: 14 August 1997
- Citation: [1998] 1 NZLR 41

Court membership
- Judges sitting: Keith J, Blanchard J, Cartwright J

Keywords
- negligence

Tertiary Institutes Allied Staff Assoc Inc v Tahana [1998] 1 NZLR 41 is a cited case in New Zealand regarding the legal defence of judicial proceedings regarding defamation claims in tort.

== Background ==
Unhappy with the performance of the Chief Executive Mr Tahana, of the Waiariki polytech, the Tertiary Institutes Allied Staff Association lodged a complaint with the polytech's council.

As a result of this complaint, Tahana sued the association for defamation. They in turn defended the claim on the grounds of being absolutely privileged under section 14 of the Defamation Act, which covers matters raised judicially, such as a court proceedings.

== Held ==
The court held that the Polytech's tribunal did not meet the threshold of being "judicial", and the associations defence failed.
