= ASB Bank Ltd v Harlick =

ASB Bank Limited v Harlick
- Court: Court of Appeal of New Zealand
- Full case name: ASB Bank Limited v Harlick
- Decided: 6 December 1995
- Citation: [1996] 1 NZLR 655

Court membership
- Judges sitting: Gault J, Henry J, McGechan

ASB Bank Limited v Harlick [1996] 1 NZLR 655 is a cited case in New Zealand regarding unconscionable bargains.

== Background ==
The Harlicks daughter and son in law wished to purchase a bread run, and in order to get the loan from the ASB, the Harlick's went guarantors on the loan.

Later, the loan came into default, and the ASB pursued the Harlick's for the loan. The Harlick's applied to the High Court to have the ASB's mortgage over their house set aside on the grounds of unconscionability, and the court set aside the mortgage.

The ASB appealed.

== Held ==
The Court of Appeal ruled that the Harlick's had not suffered from any "material disadvantage or disability', one of the three crucial elements for unconscionable bargains. The Court restored the ASB's mortgage over their house.
