= Riddell v Porteous =

- Court: Court of Appeal of New Zealand
- Full case name: Riddell v Porteous, Dunedin City Council, Bagley
- Citation: [1999] 1 NZLR 1
- Transcript: Court of Appeal judgment

Court membership
- Judges sitting: Thomas, Keith, Blanchard J

Keywords
- negligence

Riddell v Porteous [1999] 1 NZLR 1 is a cited case in New Zealand regarding liability in tort for defective products.

== Background ==
The Bagleys hired Riddell on a "labour only" basis to build their house in Mosgiel based on plans drawn up by Bagley's architect. After the house was completed, it was discovered that Riddell had departed from the approved plans as far as the deck was concerned, resulting in rainwater seeping into their house.

This departure from the plans escaped the councils building inspector.

However, before this defect came to their notice, the Bagleys had sold their house to Porteous, who soon discovered the defect.

Porteous subsequently sued Riddell, the Dunedin City Council, and the Bagleys as well, and was originally awarded $21,200 in damages by the District Court.

On appeal, the High Court set aside this award.

== Held ==
The Court of Appeal reinstated the District Court's original judgement.
