= Brown v Brown =

- Court: Court of Appeal of New Zealand
- Full case name: Robert Brown v Leonard Brown
- Decided: 10 July 1980
- Citation: [1980] 1 NZLR 484

Court membership
- Judges sitting: McMullin J, Cooke J, Richardson J

Keywords
- restraint of trade

Brown v Brown [1980] 1 NZLR 484 is a frequently cited case involving the modifying of restraint of trade clauses.

== Background ==
Brothers Robert and Leonard Brown ran an oil drilling business together until they had a falling out, which resulted in Robert buying out Leonard's share of the business. Part of the sale agreement was that Leonard agreed to a restraint of trade, that meant he could not compete as a well driller anywhere in New Zealand, for the next 20 years. That was in 1968.

Years later, Leonard decided to reenter the well drilling business with his sons.

Robert tried to enforce the 20 years restraint of trade clause.

== Decision ==
The Court of Appeal ruled that the restraint of trade was unreasonable in both the area and the time period, as Robert was unable to provide any evidence to support the need for these to protect his business.

Accordingly, the court modified the restraint of trade by reducing the area to the northern part of the North Island, as well as reducing the length to 12 years.

McMullin J stated "The first respondent's evidence was that he wanted to keep the appellant out of the industry for the rest of his life. That, I think, is the only explanation for a covenant of such a length."
