= Allied Finance and Investments v Haddow & Co =

- Court: Court of Appeal of New Zealand
- Full case name: Allied Finance and Investments v Haddow & Co
- Decided: 19 April 1983
- Citation: [1983] NZLR 22

Court membership
- Judges sitting: Cooke P, Richardson J, McMullin J

Allied Finance and Investments v Haddow & Co [1983] NZLR 22 is a cited case in New Zealand regarding negligence by a solicitor. The Court of Appeal ruled that a lawyer owed a duty of care to the holder of a security for a loan to his client, in preparing a certificate attesting to his client's liability.

== Background ==
Allied Finance, a finance company was lending Roger Hill $25,000 to personally purchase a yacht called Sagittarius, with the yacht being used as security for the loan.

In order to process the loan, Hill's solicitors, Haddow & Co certified to Allied Finance "that the instrument by way of security is fully binding on Roger Kenneth Hill" as well as "on behalf of our client, that there are no other charges whatsoever of the yacht Sagittarius".

Haddow issued this certificate despite the fact that Roger was not purchasing the yacht himself, but by his company Equity Dealers Ltd instead, which resulted in Allied having arguably a legally unenforceable security over the yacht.

Ultimately, Hill used the $25,000 for other purposes than pay for the yacht, resulting in the seller, Mr Johnson repossessing the yacht and selling it for $25,000.

Allied claimed from Johnson that they were legally owed the sale proceeds, and they settled on a payment of $16,000, leaving a shortfall remaining of $7095.

With Hill now bankrupt, Allied sued his solicitors for the shortfall.

Haddow argued that they only owed a duty of care to their client, and not to any other parties.

== Held ==
The court of Appeal ruled that Haddow owed a duty of care to Allied, and thus were liable to reimburse them for their loss.
