= Fleming v Securities Commission =

1995 Court of Appeal of New Zealand case

- Court: Court of Appeal of New Zealand
- Full case name: W D Fleming, P F C Murdock, J Carley v Securities Commission, Taranaki Newspapers Ltd
- Decided: 21 March 1995
- Citation: [1995] 2 NZLR 514

Court membership
- Judges sitting: Cooke P, Richardson J, Casey J, Gault J, Ellis J

Keywords
- negligence

Fleming v Securities Commission [1995] 2 NZLR 514 is a cited case in New Zealand regarding negligent cases against the government.

== Background ==
Between 1987 and 1988, finance company Star Investments placed adverts for deposits in 2 Taranaki newspapers. These adverts were illegal under the Securities Act on numerous grounds. A concerned local solicitor contacted the Securities Commission, and they commenced an investigation, resulting in the Commission advising both the company and the newspaper to cease advertising the securities.

Despite this, the advertisements continued until the company collapsed.

Three of the investors sued both the Securities Commission and the newspaper

== Held ==
The court of appeal rejected their claim.
