= Connor v Pukerau Store Ltd =

1981 New Zealand civil law case

- Court: Court of Appeal of New Zealand
- Full case name: Connor v Pukerau Store Ltd
- Decided: 3 September 1981
- Citation: [1981] 1 NZLR 384

Court membership
- Judges sitting: Cooke J, Somers J, Barker J

Connor v Pukerau Store Ltd [1981] 1 NZLR 384 is a cited case in New Zealand regarding "subject to finance" clauses in conditional contracts, which requires a purchaser to make all reasonable steps to obtain finance, including asking the vendor to finance the transaction.
