= Moreton v Montrose Ltd (in liq) =

- Court: Court of Appeal of New Zealand
- Full case name: John Ernest Moreton and Peter Craig v Montrose Limited (in liquidation); John Ernest Moreton and Peter Craig v New Zealand Insurance Co Ltd, National Mutual Fire Insurance Company Limited, Insurance Company of North America Limited, and Montrose Limited (in liquidation)
- Decided: 24 April 1986
- Citation: [1986] 2 NZLR 496
- Transcript: Court of Appeal judgment High Court judgment

Court membership
- Judges sitting: Cooke P, McMullin J, Casey J

Keywords
- waiver

Moreton v Montrose Ltd (in liq) [1986] 2 NZLR 496 is a cited case in New Zealand regarding where a condition in conditional contract is for the sole benefit of one party, the condition can be unilaterally waived by that party.

== Background ==
Montrose owned a fire damaged villa on a 3/4 acre section in Tauranga. After being unsuccessful in selling the property at auction, they later on 24 February 1981, it entered into a conditional sale agreement with Moreton and Craig for $215,000, which Montrose was to provide a 60% second mortgage to finance the deal.

The conditions of the offer to purchase was that a feasibility study be done regarding converting the property into either a hospital or a rest home, as well as obtaining the necessary council planning consents.

However, the very night of the sale, a second fire broke out on the property, destroying what was left of the villa.

The purchasers, sensing a big insurance payout for the fire, submitted the following day, a planning consent application with the council, which was later declined.

In order to keep the sale agreement going, Moreton and Craig notified Montrose that they were unilaterally waiving their conditions for the purchase and argued the sale was now unconditional.

Montrose replied that the conditions were not for the sole benefit of the purchasers, so they were unable to unilaterally waive them, as if the planning consent was granted, it would have improved the security of Montrose's second mortgage in the property.

Moreton and Craig sued Montrose.

== Held ==
The Court held that the planning consent would have given the vendor "significant benefit" as far as their investment in the second mortgage was concerned. Thus, Moreton and Craig could not unilaterally waive the conditions, as they benefited both parties.
