= Gillies v Keogh =

- Court: Court of Appeal of New Zealand
- Full case name: Gillies v Keogh
- Decided: 29 September 1989
- Citation: CA26/88 [1989] NZCA 168; [1989] 2 NZLR 327; (1989) 5 NZFLR 549; (1989) 5 FRNZ 490
- Transcript: High Court judgment Court of Appeal judgment

Court membership
- Judges sitting: Cooke P, Richardson J, Casey J, Bisson J

Gillies v Keogh CA26/88 [1989] NZCA 168; [1989] 2 NZLR 327; (1989) 5 NZFLR 549; (1989) 5 FRNZ 490 is a cited case in New Zealand regarding whether de facto relation property is in a constructive trust.
