= Boulder Consolidated Ltd v Tangaere =

- Court: Court of Appeal of New Zealand
- Full case name: Boulder Consolidated Ltd v Tangaere
- Decided: 6 August 1980
- Citation: [1980] 1 NZLR 560

Court membership
- Judges sitting: Richmond P, Cooke J, McMullin J

Boulder Consolidated Ltd v Tangaere [1980] 1 NZLR 560 is a cited court case in New Zealand regarding the objective approach to contract formation.

== Background ==
In 1971, Mr Tangaere purchased a section from a Lower Hutt sub division development developed by Boulder Consolidated.

Due to problems in obtaining that title, the parties in 1974 agreed to substitute another section instead.

That section too, became problematic as well, and in 1976 Boulder advised Tangaere that he could either request a refund of his deposit or substitute the section for yet another one in the development.

Tangaere's solicitor in reply, requested the developer to supply him with a list of available sections for his consideration.

In March 1977 Boulder duly sent out a list of the available sections, with a comment on an attached slip of paper: "Sections with titles available listed herewith. I suggest Mr Tangaere keeps in touch with Doug Quirk Phone 861-878".

With no reply from Tangaere, on 15 June 1977, Boulder again wrote seeking instruction from him, advising him that "...there are a number of excellent sections still available...".

Six days later, Tangaere advised he wanted to purchase section 138 However, by this time, section 138 had already been sold to another party.

A frustrated Tangaere claimed that there was a valid legal contract of sale for section 138, and subsequently sued the developer for breach of contract, and was awarded $11,771.25 in damages by the Supreme Court. Boulder appealed.

== Held ==
The court ruled that there was no formal offer of sale for section 138, and allowed the appeal. The High Court's previous award for damages was set aside.
