= MacIndoe v Mainzeal Group Ltd =

- Court: Court of Appeal of New Zealand
- Full case name: MacIndoe v Mainzeal Group Ltd
- Decided: 18 March 1991
- Citation: [1991] 3 NZLR 273

Court membership
- Judges sitting: Cooke P, Richardson J, Hardie Boys J

MacIndoe v Mainzeal Group Ltd [1991] 3 NZLR 273 is a cited case in New Zealand regarding the legal enforceability of a contract where there is a breach of a stipulation.

== Background ==
MacIndoe purchased a stratum title in a property development from Mainzeal, with payments to be paid by instalments.

Clause 8 of the sale agreement made making time of the essence to pay the instalments.

MacIndoe was later late on paying an instalment, and as a result, Mainzeal cancelled the contract.

== Held ==
Given that paying the instalment on time was an essential part of the contract, Mainzeal were entitled to treat the contract as being repudiated.
