= Rolls-Royce New Zealand Ltd v Carter Holt Harvey Ltd =

- Court: Court of Appeal of New Zealand
- Full case name: ROLLS-ROYCE NEW ZEALAND LIMITED Appellant v CARTER HOLT HARVEY LIMITED Respondent And Strike-Out Respondent AND GENESIS POWER LIMITED Strike-Out Applicant
- Decided: 23 June 2004
- Citation: [2005] 1 NZLR 324
- Transcript: Court of Appeal judgment

Court membership
- Judges sitting: Gault P, Anderson J, Glazebrook J

Keywords
- negligence

Rolls-Royce New Zealand Ltd v Carter Holt Harvey Ltd [2005] 1 NZLR 324 is decision of the Court of Appeal of New Zealand regarding tort claims in situations where a claim can be in both tort and contract.

== Background ==
Carter Holt entered into a contract with ECNZ (now Genesis Energy) for them to construct a cogeneration plant at their Kinleith paper mill that would be fueled by waste byproduct from the mill, with the contract having a non liability clause.

ECNZ in turn subcontracted the work to Rolls-Royce.

Problems later were experienced with the generators that were installed, and CHH sued ECNZ for breach of contract. As there was no contract between CHH and Rolls-Royce, they were sued for negligence in tort.

Rolls-Royce applied for the tort claim against them to be struck out on the basis that ECNZ could not have a claim in both contract and tort.

== Held ==
The court ruled where parties are involved in complex commercial relationships, there could only be duties owed in contract, and not in tort. Accordingly, the court granted Rolls-Royces application to strike out part of the claim.

However, the court did leave open to a claim in tort still being arguable for misrepresentation claims in tort, as per in Hedley Byrne.
