= Caruthers v Whitaker =

New Zealand contract case law

- Court: Court of Appeal of New Zealand
- Full case name: Caruthers v Whitaker
- Decided: 7 July 1975
- Citation: [1975] 2 NZLR 667

Court membership
- Judges sitting: McCarthy J, Richmond J, Woodhouse J

Caruthers v Whitaker [1975] 2 NZLR 667 is a cited case in New Zealand regarding "subject to contract" clauses in conditional contracts.
