= SGS (New Zealand) Ltd v Quirke Export Ltd =

New Zealand contract case law

- Court: Court of Appeal of New Zealand
- Full case name: SGS (New Zealand) Limited v Quirke Export Limited
- Decided: 13 October 1987
- Citation: [1988] 1 NZLR 52 CA
- Transcript: High Court judgment

Court membership
- Judges sitting: Cooke P, Somers J, Bisson J

Keywords
- limitations

SGS (New Zealand) Ltd v Quirke Export Ltd [1988] 1 NZLR 52 CA is a leading case in New Zealand regarding limitation clauses contained in contracts.

== Background ==
Quirke Export exported 2 shipments of onions to Taiwan. The sizes of the onions were important, with the onions required to be of a minimum size of between 2.25 and 2.5 inches in order to suit the processing equipment in fast food restaurants.

In order to ensure that the onions exported were not smaller than this size, they hired SGS to certify that the onions did not exceed the minimum allowable size.

SGS were employed on the basis that any liability for damages was limited to a maximum of 10 times the SGS inspection fee charged, with the clause stating, "The company's responsibility under this certificate is limited to gross negligence proven by Principals and will in no case be more than 10 times fees or commissions".

In 1983, SGS issued inspection certificates for 2 shipments of onions, charging $125, where upon delivery in Taiwan, were discovered to be outside the size requirements allowed, with 26% of the first shipment being found undersized, and the 76% of the second shipment.

It was subsequently discovered that SGS had issued the inspection certificates without first inspecting the onions, which the court later held as gross negligence on SGS's part.

These undersized onions were subsequently sold at a loss, and Quirke sued SGS for damages, and the High Court awarded $35,000 in damages against SGS.

SGS appealed, claiming that in any case, their liability for damages was limited to $1,125.

== Decision ==
The Court of Appeal ruled that the actual loss was not $35,007, but instead only $8,000. However, the court ruled that the limitation clause was valid, and reduced the damages award to $1,250.
