= City Economic Herald =

Chinese newspaper

- Native name: 城市经济导报
- Owner: Xi'an Daily Agency
- Publisher: City Economic Herald Agency
- Founded: June 18, 1988
- Language: Chinese
- Headquarters: Xi'an, Shaanxi
- OCLC number: 866033681
- Website: ceeh.com.cn

City Economic Herald (Chinese: 城市经济导报), also known as Chengshi Jingji Daobao, is a Xi'an-based newspaper published in simplified Chinese in China. The newspaper was inaugurated on June 18, 1988, and its predecessor was Northwest Industry and Commerce Newspaper (西北工商报), which was originally jointly sponsored by the Bureau of Industry and Commerce of the Five Northwestern Provinces (西北五省工商局).

In December 1999, Northwest Industry and Commerce Newspaper was transferred to the management of Xi'an Daily Agency, and the paper was renamed City Economic Herald on 16 August 2000.

== Suspended for rectification ==
The City Economic Herald has been suspended for rectification since April 2018, and officially resumed publication on January 15, 2019. According to a staff of the editorial office of the paper, the reason for the newspaper's suspension for rectification was the "regulation of the public opinion environment" (舆论环境整治).
