= A M Bisley & Co Ltd v Thompson =

- Court: Court of Appeal of New Zealand
- Full case name: A M Bisley & Co Ltd v Thompson
- Decided: 14 October 1982
- Citation: [1982] 2 NZLR 696

Court membership
- Judges sitting: Woodhouse P, Cooke J, Sir Clifford Richmond

A M Bisley & Co Ltd v Thompson [1982] 2 NZLR 696 is a cited case in New Zealand regarding express terms in a contract. It highlights one of the exceptions to the parol evidence rule, that is contracts that are partly written, and partly oral contracts.

== Background ==
Thompson ordered a grain dryer to be installed by A M Bisley on his crop farm so he could harvest his grain crops early.

In the written contract, the "estimated delivery date" was a vague "ASAP", however, it had been orally promised to be installed by the next harvest. However, A M Bisley ordered the grain dryer from an overseas manufacturer late, resulting in the grain dryer not being fully installed on Thompson's farm in time.

This unfortunately left Thompson unable to harvest his barley crop early when a storm destroyed his crop.

As a result of this, Thompson refused to pay Bisley for the grain dryer.

Bisley ultimately sued him for the cost of the grain dryer, and Thompson filed a counterclaim for breach of contract for the loss of his barley crop.

The District Court ruled in favour of both claims, meaning that Thompson did not have to pay Bisley's for the grain dryer.

Both parties appealed.

== Held ==
The Court of appeal dismissed both the appeals.
