= Re Chase =

- Court: Court of Appeal of New Zealand
- Full case name: Public Trustee as administrator of the estate of Paul Chase, deceased v The Attorney-General sued on behalf of the Police
- Decided: 22 September 1988
- Citation: [1989] 1 NZLR 325

Court membership
- Judges sitting: Cooke P, Somers J, Henry J

Re Chase [1989] 1 NZLR 325 is a cited case regarding civil claims being barred by ACC.

== Background ==
Paul Chase was a patched member of the Petone Mongrel Mob, and he was with a fellow gang member who were accused of discharging a firearm inside a Lower Hutt tavern frequented by a rival gang.

As the result of Chase being implicated in a gang related shooting, the police arranged a dawn entry into his apartment by armed police on 18 April 1983.

Being startled, Chase thought a rival gang was trying to break into his house, and to defend himself, he approached the police with a weight bar, which the armed officers mistook for a gun barrel and shot him dead.

Barred by ACC law in suing for damages, his estate sued for exemplary damages.

== Held ==
The court refused to award damages
