= Ansley v Prospectus Nominees Unlimited =

- Court: Court of Appeal of New Zealand
- Full case name: BRUCE ROBIN ANSLEY AND JUSTINE ANN ANSLEY Appellants v PROSPECTUS NOMINEES UNLIMITED Respondent
- Decided: 1 December 2003
- Citation: [2004] NZCA 14; [2004] 2 NZLR 590; (2004) 5 NZ ConvC 193,914; (2004) 5 NZCPR 330; (2004) 10 TCLR 952 (3 March 2004)
- Transcript: Court of Appeal judgment

Court membership
- Judges sitting: Gault P, McGrath J, Anderson J

Ansley v Prospectus Nominees Unlimited [2004] NZCA 14; [2004] 2 NZLR 590; (2004) 5 NZ ConvC 193,914; (2004) 5 NZCPR 330; (2004) 10 TCLR 952 (3 March 2004) is a cited case in New Zealand regarding whether a party to a conditional contract can treat that contract as ended if they are responsible for the failure of the stipulated condition.

== Background ==
PNU was subdividing a property in Wānaka. In October 2001, whilst the subdivision consent was tied up in the Environment Court, they entered into a conditional sale with the Ansleys for $1.05 million, on the proviso that PNU obtained the necessary consents by 28 February 2002.

Due to PNU not following up the consent in a timely manner, the consents did not eventuate until after this date, and as a result PNU claimed the Ansleys contract was at an end, leaving PNU to sell the property to a 3rd party for a higher price.

The Ansleys unsuccessfully sought specific performance for the transaction, and sued PNU for account of the profit they made on the resale of the property.

PNU argued that the contract was at an end. The Ansleys argued that the contract only ended due to PNU not pursuing the consent in a proper manner.

== Held ==
The court held that PNU had not pursued the consent in a proper manner, and awarded the Ansleys PNU's profit on the resale.
