= Bradley West Solicitors Nominee Co Ltd v Keeman =

- Court: Court of Appeal of New Zealand
- Full case name: Bradley West Solicitors Nominee Co Ltd v Keeman
- Citation: [1994] 2 NZLR 111

Court membership
- Judge sitting: Tipping J

Bradley West Solicitors Nominee Co Ltd v Keeman (1994) 2 NZLR 111 is a cited case in New Zealand regarding the common law remedy of rectification.
