= Cuff v Broadlands Finance Ltd =

1987 New Zealand court case

- Court: Court of Appeal of New Zealand
- Full case name: Archibald Arthur Cuff, Patrick John Ahern, Dehroy Baron Packer v Broadlands Finance Limited
- Decided: 30 September 1987
- Citation: CA127/85 [1987] NZCA 93; [1987] 2 NZLR 343
- Transcript: Court of Appeal judgment

Court membership
- Judges sitting: Somers P, Casey J, Chilwell J

Keywords
- negligence

Cuff v Broadlands Finance Ltd (CA127/85 [1987] NZCA 93; [1987] 2 NZLR 343) is a cited case in New Zealand regarding tort claims in conversion, for interference with one's goods.

== Background ==
Broadlands Finance repossessed the fishing vessel "Concord" jointly owned by Cuff and Ahern. On board the vessel at the time, was items owned personally by Cuff, as well as goods jointly owned by Cuff and Ahern. Items owned by Patrick were also on board.

Broadlands refused to return these goods, and the parties sued them in tort for conversion of these goods.

In the District Court, the judge awarded damages to Cuff of $12,000, and damages of $1,289 to Ahern.

On appeal to the High Court, Broadlands was successful in having these awards set aside.

Cuff appealed.

== Held ==
The Court of Appeal restored the award to Cuff.

Footnote: When the award for damages was first set aside, Cuff was subsequently declared bankrupt, and special leave by the Official Assignee was required for him to file this appeal.
