= Sharplin v Henderson =

Ñew Zealand law case 1990

- Court: Court of Appeal of New Zealand
- Full case name: Sharplin v Henderson
- Decided: 28 June 1988
- Citation: [1990] 2 NZLR 134

Court membership
- Judges sitting: Cooke P, McMullin J Hardie Boys

Sharplin v Henderson [1990] 2 NZLR 134 is a cited case in New Zealand regarding the requirement under section 7(4)(b) of the Contractual Remedies Act 1970 that a breach of a contract must be "substantial" for a contract to be cancelled.

== Background ==
Sharplin purchased a Tauranga orchard from Henderson.

After the sale, it was discovered that the real estate agent had misrepresented that 900 trees belonged to the property, representing 25% of the property.

Sharplin sued for misrepresentation.

== Held ==
The misrepresentation was substantial, and relief was granted.
