= Dundee Farm Ltd v Bambury Holdings Ltd =

Dundee Farm Ltd v. Bambury Holdings Ltd
- Court: High Court of New Zealand
- Full case name: Dundee Farm Ltd v. Bambury Holdings Ltd
- Decided: 30 July 1978
- Citation: [1978] 1 NZLR 647

Court membership
- Judge sitting: Coates J

Keywords
- mistake

Dundee Farm Ltd. v. Bambury Holdings Ltd. (1978) is a case involving the sale of a farm in Bombay, South Auckland and is notable as it is often cited in New Zealand on issues of mistake, and reinforces the English case of Joscelyne v Nissen [1970] 2 QB 86 into NZ case law.

== Background ==
The vendor's intention was to sell their 544 acres (220 ha) of farmland. Unfortunately, the subsequent sale agreement was complicated by the fact that the 544 acres was on numerous titles, and by mistake the vendor's solicitors included in the sale agreement a title for a 12 acres (4.9 ha) block, on the mistaken belief that these 12 acres were the south western corner of the farm.

It however transpired that these extra 12 acres were not only not the south western corner of the farm, it was not even near the farm, and was instead the vendor's residential lifestyle block 3 miles (4.8 km) away in Pukekohe.

When the vendor notified the purchaser of this mistake, the purchaser refused to settle on the sale contract, upon which the vendor brought an action for rectification and specific performance.

== Held ==
The High Court of New Zealand ruled that as it was a pure mistake that the extra title was included, and that the purchaser's position had not changed, they ruled in favour of both rectification and for specific performance.
