= Carey v Hastie =

New Zealand court case on illegal contracts

- Court: Court of Appeal of New Zealand
- Full case name: Carey v Hastie
- Decided: 3 November 1967
- Citation: [1968] NZLR 276

Court membership
- Judges sitting: North P, Turner, McCarthy

Keywords
- illegal contracts

Carey v Hastie [1968] NZLR 276 is a case cited regarding illegal contracts.

== Background ==
Hastie hired Carey to do some building alterations at his Wellesley Street business premises, and was later invoiced £274 for the work.

However, local council bylaws required that a building permit be first issued by the council before building commenced, although for small jobs, the council practice was to allow the building permit to be issued after building had started.

At the start of the contract, the owner was required to obtain the necessary building permits, but as the owner was causing delays to the build over approval of the final plans, in an effort to speed up the build, the builder agreed to take responsibility to get the permits.

Carey subsequently completed the alterations, but for unknown reasons, he did not get the necessary building permits for the work, although the council had approved the building plan, and the work being inspected by a council building inspector.

Not satisfied with receiving illegal unpermitted alterations, Carey paid £139 of the account, and refused to pay the balance, claim the contract was illegal and not legally enforceable.

The builder subsequently sued successfully in the District Court for the balance of £135, but was reversed on appeal in the High Court.

And the matter made its way through the courts despite the claim's ridiculously low amount, until it finally reached the Court of Appeal.

== Held ==
The court held that by not getting the necessary building consent, breached the council bylaws, making the contract illegal by performance.

Footnote: This case pre dates the Illegal Contracts Act 1970
