= McMahon v Gilberd and Co Ltd =

- Court: Court of Appeal of New Zealand
- Full case name: McMahon v Gilberd and Co Ltd
- Decided: 1 October 1954
- Citation: [1955] NZLR 1206

Court membership
- Judges sitting: Cooke J, North J, Turner J

McMahon v Gilberd and Co Ltd [1955] NZLR 1206 is a cited case in New Zealand regarding that open offers to the public cannot be accepted by any party that has been previously informed they are excluded from the offer.

== Background ==
Gilberd was a cordial manufacture, and it advertise to the public that it would pay a certain amount for every bottle returned to them.

McMahon was one of its bottle suppliers, for which Gilberd paid them a lesser wholesale rate for the return of its bottles, and in its sales dockets, contained a clause confirming that the offer to pay the public was not applicable to them.

Despite this notification, McMahon sought payment for their bottles base on the higher rate advertised payable to the public. Gilberd refused to pay, claiming that even though their offer was to the public in general, that McMahon was not able to accept the offer, as they had been previously advised that they were not entitled to accept this offer.

== Held ==
The court held that McMahon could not accept this offer, and so their claim failed.
