= Truth (NZ) Ltd v Avery =

- Court: Court of Appeal of New Zealand
- Full case name: Truth (NZ) Ltd v Avery
- Decided: 21 October 1958
- Citation: [1959] NZLR 274

Court membership
- Judges sitting: Gresson, North, Cleary

Truth (NZ) Ltd v Avery [1959] NZLR 274 is a cited case regarding the defence of honest opinion in defamation.
