= Pharmacy Care Systems Ltd v Attorney-General =

- Court: Court of Appeal of New Zealand
- Full case name: Pharmacy Care Systems Ltd v Attorney-General
- Decided: 16 August 2004
- Citation: (2001) 17 PRNZ 308
- Transcript: Court of Appeal judgment

Court membership
- Judges sitting: McGrath J, Hammond J, O'Regan J

Keywords
- duress

Pharmacy Care Systems Ltd v Attorney-General (2004) 17 PRNZ 308 is a cited case in New Zealand regarding the seven elements of duress.

== Background ==
Pharmacy Care set up a high volume, low margin service to supply government institutions. One of these institutions was the Northern Regional Health Authority commonly referred to as "North Health". Problems later developed when North Health discovered that PCS was recycling drugs, i.e. billing North Health for supply, unused drugs that had been previously returned by institutions, that North Health had previously paid for. This resulted in North Health calling in an investigator, as well as with holding monies it owed from Pharmacy Care.

To resolve the matter, Pharmacy Care agreed to enter into a Deed of Settlement, agreeing to refund $80,000 to North Health. However, 3 1/2 years later, Pharmacy Care sought to have the Deed of Settlement set aside, claiming it was entered into as the result of duress by North Health, claiming they threatened a fraud prosecution if it was not accepted.

== Held ==
The Court of Appeal found no evidence that North Health had threatened a fraud prosecution. And even if it had found such evidence, the delay of 3 1/2 years in challenging the agreement amounted to affirmation of the contract.
