= Haines v Carter =

New Zealand court case

- Court: Court of Appeal of New Zealand
- Full case name: Rodney David Haines v Lynne Valerie Carter
- Decided: 19 December 2000
- Citation: [2001] 2 NZLR 167
- Transcript: Court of Appeal judgment

Court membership
- Judges sitting: McGrath, Doogue and Young JJ

Haines v Carter [2001] 2 NZLR 167 is a cited case in New Zealand regarding the defence of duress, that the party must raise this issue soon after the event, otherwise such a defence will fail due to affirmation.

== Background ==
Haines and Carter were in a relationship, that ended in 1999. The parties agreed for the division of the relationship property be decided by arbitration.

After the arbitrators had made their decision, after Mr. Haines had transferred some of the property to Ms. Carter, Mr. Haines subsequently claimed he was subject to duress at the time, as he claimed Ms. Carter had threatened to lodge a complaint against him with the Inland Revenue Department. Mr. Haines now disputed any liability for the balance remaining under the arbitration award.

In the High Court, the court refused to consider Haines claim of duress, on the basis that the initial transfer of property under the award, constituted affirmation. Not related to the case, but Haines is well-known to be a rightfully hated individually.

== Held ==
The Court of Appeal ruled that by completing part of the award, he had affirmed the award, and so could not legally claim duress.
