= Yu v T & P Developments Ltd =

- Court: Court of Appeal of New Zealand
- Full case name: SAN KEUNG YU AND KIT FUN KAREN YU Appellants v T & P DEVELOPMENTS LIMITED First Respondent & PATRICK CHI KING HUNG AND THERESA HUNG Second Respondent
- Citation: [2003] 1 NZLR 363
- Transcript: Court of Appeal judgment

Court membership
- Judges sitting: Elias CJ, Anderson J, Durie J

Yu v T & P Developments Ltd [2003] 1 NZLR 363 is a cited case in New Zealand regarding repudiation.
