= Oliver v Bradley =

- Court: Court of Appeal of New Zealand
- Full case name: Oliver v Bradley
- Decided: 24 July 1987
- Citation: [1987] NZCA 70; [1987] 1 NZLR 586; (1987) 4 NZFLR 449
- Transcript: copy of judgment

Oliver v Bradley CA51/87 [1987] NZCA 70; [1987] 1 NZLR 586; (1987) 4 NZFLR 449 is a cited case in New Zealand regarding whether de facto relationship property is held in a constructive trust.
