= Hunt v Wilson =

- Court: Court of Appeal of New Zealand
- Full case name: Hunt v Wilson
- Decided: 22 May 1975
- Citation: [1978] 2 NZLR 261

Court membership
- Judge sitting: Mahon J

Hunt v Wilson [1978] 2 NZLR 261 is a cited case in New Zealand regarding conditional contracts.

== Background ==
Hunt and Wilson jointly owned some farmland. After a falling out between the 2 parties, Hunt agreed to sell his share to Wilson, conditional on the price being agreed by valuers. If the valuers did not agree to a price, then the matter was to be referred to arbitration.

However, several years had passed without the valuers coming to agreement, and for unknown reasons, the matter was not subsequently referred to arbitration.

As a result, a frustrated Hunt tried to rescind the sale contract.

== Held ==
The Court of Appeal rule that Hunt could not legally rescind this contract.
