= Frampton v McCully =

- Court: Court of Appeal of New Zealand
- Full case name: Frampton v McCully
- Decided: 21 October 1975
- Citation: [1976] 1 NZLR 270

Court membership
- Judges sitting: McCarthy P, Richmond J, Cooke J

Keywords
- solicitors approval

Frampton v McCully [1976] 1 NZLR 270 is a New Zealand case cited regarding whether a contract that is subject to one parties solicitor's approval and whether such approval can be with held for non conveyancing matters.

== Background ==
McCully entered in a conditional sale agreement with Moir for a trust property, with the condition being subject to the approval of the trust's solicitor (and trustee) Mr Frampton. The approval was not limited to just conveyancing matters. Mr Frampton subsequently refused to give approval for the sale, for non conveyancing reasons. McCully claimed that solicitors approval was only allowed to be with held for conveyance matters.

== Held ==
The Court of Appeal ruled that as the sales agreement was clearly a conditional offer, and as that condition was never met, there was no legally binding contract between the parties.
