= Starlight Enterprises Ltd v Lapco Enterprises Ltd =

- Court: Court of Appeal of New Zealand
- Full case name: Starlight Enterprises Ltd v Lapco Enterprises Ltd
- Decided: 23 May 1979
- Citation: [1979] 2 NZLR 744

Court membership
- Judges sitting: Woodhouse, Richardson, McMullin

Starlight Enterprises Ltd v Lapco Enterprises Ltd [1979] 2 NZLR 744 is a cited case in New Zealand law regarding repudiation.

== Background ==
Lapco manufactured 4,000 bags for Starlight for $3.00 each. 571 bags into the contract, they sent Starlight a letter saying "we wish to advise you that our new price will have to be $4.10 per bag from now on. Furthermore, we wish to point out that we are going to step up the rate of production of your bags in order to avoid any further increase".

Starlight treated this letter as repudiation, and sent them a letter saying "we have decided to cancel the contract with your company forwith".

== Held ==
The court ruled that the contract was not repudiation.
