= Holloway v Attorney-General =

New Zealand case regarding unilateral contracts

- Court: Court of Appeal of New Zealand
- Full case name: Holloway v Attorney-General
- Decided: 12 December 1994
- Citation: [1994] 2 ERNZ 528

Court membership
- Judges sitting: Richardson J, Hardie Boys J, McKay J

Keywords
- unilateral contract

Holloway v Attorney-General [1994] 2 ERNZ 528 is a case frequently cited in New Zealand regarding unilateral contracts.

== Background ==
Until the late 1980s, in an effort to reduce a shortage of school teachers in New Zealand, the Ministry of Education stated that people who completed a teachers course at university, upon graduation, would be employed for 2 years as a teacher by the ministry.

However, with declining numbers of students, and a substantial budget deficit, the government ceased this guarantee of employment, and when Ms Hollaway graduated as a teacher she was not offered the promised employment.

Not happy with this, Holloway sued the Ministry of Education in the Employment Court.

== Held ==
The Court of Appeal ruled that the Ministry of Education's statements of "will be appointed [as a teacher]" was a unilateral contract, thus there was a legally binding obligation to employ Ms Holloway.

Footnote: Although Holloway won the battle of whether there was a legally binding employment contract, she at the same time lost the war, as the Court of Appeal ruled that the Employment Court had no jurisdiction to hear such a case in the first place, leaving Holloway having to refile her claim via the District Court instead.
