= Liebherr Export AG v Ellison Trading Ltd =

- Court: Court of Appeal of New Zealand
- Full case name: LIEBHERR EXPORT - AG First Appellant AND LIEBHERR AUSTRALIA PTY LIMITED Second Appellant v ELLISON TRADING LIMITED Respondent
- Decided: 29 June 2004
- Transcript: Court of Appeal judgment

Court membership
- Judges sitting: Glazebrook J, Chisholm J, Gendall J

Liebherr Export AG v Ellison Trading Ltd is a New Zealand legal case regarding certainty in contract formation.

== Background ==
Ellison Trading was the sole New Zealand distributor of machinery for Liebherr Export since 1977. In November 1993, suddenly informed Ellison during a dinner that Liebherr Australia was taking over the New Zealand distributorship.

Besides just being advised that he had just lost their business, the Liebherr Australia representative also informed them that they did not want to buy back any of the $800,000 in Liebherr parts that Ellison was contracted under the distribution agreement.

The Liebherr AG representative thought this was unfair, and last got Liebherr Australia to agree to purchase the parts back at a "fair and reasonable" price.

Liebherr Australia subsequently negotiations with Ellison to purchase their stock, but talks broke down after Liebherr wanted to offer less than cost price, as well as excluding from purchase much of the stock.

Liebherr eventually walked away, claiming they had no legal obligation to purchase the stock.

A less than impressed Ellison sued Liebherr under the agreement to purchase the stock, which Liebherr defended that they denied even making the offer to purchase, and if they did, they claimed that the term "fair and reasonable" lacked certainty and therefore made such a contract not legally enforceable.

The High Court ruled in favour of Ellison, and Liebherr appealed.

== Held ==
The Court of Appeal dismissed the appeal agreeing with the High Court that Liebherr did agree to purchase the stock, and that the term "fair and reasonable" could be remedied by the courts if the parties could not come to an agreed price.
