= News Media Ownership v Findlay =

- Court: Court of Appeal of New Zealand
- Full case name: News Media Ownership v Findlay
- Decided: 4 June 1970
- Citation: [1970] NZLR 1089

Court membership
- Judges sitting: North P, Turner J, Haslam J

Keywords
- negligence

News Media Ownership v Findlay [1970] NZLR 1089 is a cited case in New Zealand regarding the defence of fair comment / honest opinion to a claim involving defamation.

== Background ==
News Media's newspaper Truth ran a campaign to bring back caning. In the process, they made allegations against opposition MP Findlay that his views to the contrary were based on the fact that as he was a lawyer, he was more interested in the extra legal fees an anti-caning policy would bring him, rather than any perceived interest in victims of domestic violence.

Findlay, later sued for defamation, and was later awarded $15,000. NMO appealed.

== Held ==
The Court of Appeal dismissed the appeal.
