= Jenkins v NZI Finance Ltd =

- Court: Court of Appeal of New Zealand
- Full case name: Morgan Brynmor Jenkins & Ruby Jenkins v NZI Finance Limited and NZI Securities Kimited and NZI International Acceptances Limited
- Citation: (1991) 3 NZBLC 102,198
- Transcript: Court of Appeal judgment High Court judgment

Jenkins v NZI Finance Ltd (1991) 3 NZBLC 102,198 is a cited case in New Zealand regarding that the common law remedy of non est factum for a contract is not available simply because a party was careless in signing a contract without first properly reading it.

== Background ==
Mr Jenkins was a director of several companies company, mainly involved in the electrical fields, with the biggest contract involving the expansion of the Glenbrook steel mill.

As a result of a dispute over $3.86 million of the Glenbrook contract, these companies experienced cashflow difficulties, and to resolve this, Jenkins started discussions with NZI to increase its revolving credit facility from $500,000 to $800,000.

However, due to the financial position of the companies, NZI required additional security for the increase in the credit facility, namely a mortgage over their jointly owned Hamilton matrimonial home.

Mrs Jenkins had an appointment at 2.30pm with her husband's solicitor, although the lawyer was at least 25 minutes late. She also had a later appointment to see her son at 3.30 - 3.45.

As she was short in time, and in a hurry to make the later appointment, she signed the mortgage documents, without first referring them to her solicitor for legal advice.

Later, the companies were placed into receivership, and the bank sought to enforce the mortgage security over her home.

Mrs Jenkins claimed the mortgage was unenforceable, pleading non est factum as she did not take legal advice before signing the mortgage documents, and did not realize the nature of the mortgage.

== Held ==
The court dismissed the non est factum plea, as she was not misled into signing the mortgage documents, but instead she was careless in signing them.
