= McElroy Milne v Commercial Electronics Ltd =

- Court: Court of Appeal of New Zealand
- Full case name: McElroy Milne v Commercial Electronics Ltd
- Decided: 21 August 1992
- Citation: [1993] 1 NZLR 39
- Transcript: Court of Appeal judgment

Court membership
- Judges sitting: Cooke P, Hardie Boys J, MacKay J

McElroy Milne v Commercial Electronics Ltd [1993] 1 NZLR 39 is a cited case in New Zealand regarding remoteness of damages for the remedy of damages for breach of contract.
