= Fletcher Aluminium Ltd v O'Sullivan =

- Court: Court of Appeal of New Zealand
- Full case name: Fletcher Aluminium Ltd v Sean Francis O'Sullivan
- Decided: 15 February 2001
- Citation: [2001] 2 NZLR 731
- Transcript: Court of Appeal judgment

Court membership
- Judges sitting: Gault J, Keith J, Tipping J

Fletcher Aluminium Ltd v O'Sullivan [2001] 2 NZLR 731 is a cited case in New Zealand regarding that a restrictive covenant in a business sale may be enforceable even if there is no goodwill involved.

== Background ==
O'Sullivan developed some aluminum windows. Fletcher Aluminium, interested in the designs, entered into an agreement with him to purchase the designs for $1.7 million, as well as giving him a job as a franchise manager. Part of the agreement included a restraint of trade clause.

Later, O'Sullivan undertook employment from a rival firm, and Fletchers sought to enforce the restraint of trade agreement.

== Held ==
The court granted the restraint of trade injunction.
