= Bowkett v Action Finance Ltd =

- Court: High Court of New Zealand
- Full case name: Bowkett v Action Finance Ltd
- Decided: 2 July 1991
- Citation: [1992] 1 NZLR 449

Court membership
- Judge sitting: Tipping J

Bowkett v Action Finance Ltd [1992] 1 NZLR 449 is a cited case in New Zealand regarding unconscionable bargains.

== Background ==
The Bowketts, an elderly couple, under pressure from their son Michael, agreed to use their house as security for a loan for their son with Action Finance. The Bowketts did not seek independent legal advice, but Action Finance's legal executive advised them to do so, as well as explaining the nature of the transaction.

When the son later defaulted on the loan, Action Finance sought to foreclose on the Bowketts' house. The Bowketts obtained an interim injunction to stop the sale, pleading unconscionable bargain.

Action Finance appealed to have the injunction lifted.

== Held ==
The court refused to lift the injunction, as the Bowketts were under a special disability when they entered into the transaction.
