= Stephenson v Waite Tileman Limited =

- Court: Court of Appeal of New Zealand
- Full case name: Stephenson v Waite Tile Limited
- Decided: 27 June 1972
- Citation: [1973] 1 NZLR 152

Court membership
- Judges sitting: Turner P, Richmond, McArthur

Stephenson v Waite Tileman Limited [1973] 1 NZLR 152 is a case in New Zealand regarding causation and remoteness. That is, the case addressed whether a person is responsible for the injuries of another person if the injuries are very remote from their cause. The court answered affirmatively.
