= G v Auckland Hospital Board =

- Court: High Court of New Zealand
- Full case name: G v Auckland Hospital Board
- Decided: 28 November 1975
- Citation: [1976] 1 NZLR 638

Court membership
- Judge sitting: Henry J

Keywords
- negligence

G v Auckland Hospital Board (1976) 1 NZLR 638 is a cited case in New Zealand regarding civil damages claims from crime victims being barred under the Accident Compensation Act.

== Background ==
An employee of Auckland Hospital raped G while she was a patient and subsequently sued the hospital for damages for the rape.

The hospital defended the claim, saying that such a claim was barred under section 5 of the Accident Compensation Act 1972.

G countered that the staff member's actions were deliberate and could not be considered an accident.

== Held ==
The court ruled that the test was to look at the event from the victim's perspective, not the other party's. That being the case, the rape was an accident under the Act, making a damages claim barred under section 5.

Footnote: The date that the offending occurred, 2 April 1974, was unfortunate as it was only one day after the Accident Compensation Act [1972] came into force. Had it happened before this date, her claim would not have been legally barred.
