= Hunter v Hunter =

Legal case in New Zealand

- Court: Court of Appeal of New Zealand
- Full case name: Hunter v Hunter
- Citation: [1938] NZLR 520
- Transcript: High Court judgment

Court membership
- Judge sitting: Myers CJ

Hunter v Hunter [1938] NZLR 520 is a cited case in New Zealand regarding trustees.
