= Buhrer v Tweedie =

- Court: Court of Appeal of New Zealand
- Full case name: Buhrer v Tweedie
- Citation: [1973] 1 NZLR 517

Court membership
- Judge sitting: Wilson J

Buhrer v Tweedie [1973] 1 NZLR 517 is a cited case in New Zealand regarding where a contract is offered subject to a condition, the contract is not completed until that condition has been met.
