= Barrett v IBC International Ltd =

- Court: Court of Appeal of New Zealand
- Full case name: Barrett v IBC International Ltd
- Decided: 21 July 1995
- Citation: [1995] 3 NZLR 160

Court membership
- Judges sitting: Cooke P, Hardie Boys J, Penlington

Barrett v IBC International Ltd [1995] 3 NZLR 160 is a cited case in New Zealand regarding the legal concept of certainty regarding contract formation.

== Background ==
For the sum of $2, Barrett gave IBC International an option to purchase their property within the following 180 days. However, the settlement date in the contract merely stated it "to be mutually agreed upon exercise of option".

When IBC subsequently tried to purchase the property under this option, Barrett said the option was unenforceable, given the date of settlement was not agreed to in the option contract.

== Held ==
The court held that as the date of settlement was uncertain, the option contract was not legally binding.
