= Ballance Agri-Nutrients (Kapuni) Ltd v The Gama Foundation =

2005 New Zealand court case

- Court: Court of Appeal of New Zealand
- Full case name: Ballance Agri-Nutrients (Kapuni) Ltd v The Gama Foundation
- Decided: 5 November 2005
- Citation: (2005) 5 NZCPR 16
- Transcript: Copy of Judgement

Court membership
- Judges sitting: William Young, O’Regan and Robertson JJ

Ballance Agri-Nutrients (Kapuni) Ltd v The Gama Foundation (2005) 5 NZCPR 16 is a cited case in New Zealand regarding whether a nominee stated in a contract is sufficiently designated in order for the Contracts (Privity) Act 1982 to apply.

== Background ==
Ballance leased a Christchurch industrial property. In April 2001, Ballance had given 6 months notice that they were terminating the lease. At this date, the property was originally owned by Gama Holdings, but on 10 June 2001, ownership was transferred to the related company Gama Foundation.

Ballance were not notified of the sale at the time.

Due to the fact that the sale was a related party transaction, the sale was not registered until 9 months later in January 2002.

This delay caused problems for the landlord, when they sought payment for damages to the property, forcing Gama to seek payment as a permitted assignor under section 4 of the Contracts (Privity) Act 1982.

Ballance disputed that Gama Foundation was a permitted assignor.
