= Aotearoa International Ltd v Scancarriers A/S =

- Court: Privy Council
- Full case name: Aotearoa International Ltd v Scancarriers A/S
- Decided: 18 July 1985
- Citation: [1985] 1 NZLR 513
- Transcript: Privy Council judgment Court of Appeal judgment

Court membership
- Judges sitting: Lord Keith, Lord Roskill, Lord Brightman, Sir John Megaw, Sir Owen Woodhouse

Aotearoa International Ltd v Scancarriers A/S [1985] 1 NZLR 513 is a cited case in New Zealand regarding contract formation.

== Background ==
Aotearoa International was in the business of paper recycling, and were looking to expand by exporting to India, and was discussing with Scancarriers of shipping 4 shiploads of 1,000 tons each.

As a result of these negotiations, Scancarriers sent the following telex "FLWG OUR DISCUSSION ON FRIDAY [...] WE AGREE TO A PROMOTIONAL RATE OF US$120 [...] AND THIS RATE WILL BE HELD UNTIL 29/7/82 [...]."

However, when Aotearoa delivered the first shipment of 919 tons, Scancarriers only had space to ship some of the paper, with the remaining 271 tons being shipped on a subsequent ship.

The split sailings caused cashflow problems for Aotearoa, leaving them unable to pay for the shipping costs for the second shipment resulting in Sancarriers selling the paper to recoup the shipping costs.

Aotearoa sued for breach of contract. .

== Held ==
The Court ruled that the telex was merely a quote, and not an offer, as Aotearoa's manager admitted during cross examination that the normal shipping practice was that a freight contract only starts when the freight is delivered to the port and accepted for loading.
