= Tataurangi Tairuakena v Mua Carr =

- Court: Court of Appeal of New Zealand
- Full case name: Tataurangi Tairuakena v Mua Carr
- Decided: 20 July 1927
- Citation: [1927] NZGazLawRp 73; [1927] NZLR 688; (1927) 28 GLR 369
- Transcript: http://www.nzlii.org/cgi-bin/sinodisp/nz/cases/NZGazLawRp/1927/73.html

Tataurangi Tairuakena v Mua Carr [1927] NZGazLawRp 73; [1927] NZLR 688; (1927) 28 GLR 369 is a cited case in New Zealand case law regarding property law.
