= Compcorp Ltd v Force Entertainment Ltd =

- Court: Court of Appeal of New Zealand
- Full case name: Compcorp Ltd v Force Entertainment Ltd
- Citation: (2003) 7 NZBLC 103,996
- Transcript: Court of Appeal judgment

Court membership
- Judges sitting: Gault P, Robertson J, Baragwanath J

Compcorp Ltd v Force Entertainment Ltd (2003) 7 NZBLC 103,996 is a cited case in New Zealand regarding terms implied by the Courts to give "business efficacy" to a contract that would have otherwise been unworkable. It effectively upholds the English case of The Moorcock into New Zealand law.

== Background ==
Compcorp Limited constructed the Force Entertainment Centre in Auckland, for Force Entertainment Limited, for which a firm called MTM were helping finance by purchasing FEC shares. FEC had paid all but the remaining $1,577,000, but as MTM had not purchased the shares, FEC were unable to pay this, and they were in litigation with MTM to require them to honour their share purchase agreement.

In the meantime, FEC entered into an agreement to pay Compcorp this amount, when MTM finally purchased the FEC shares.

The relevant clause in this agreement was as follows: “The balance of any Sum Outstanding will be paid to CL by Force on the sale and settlement (and no later than within 48 hours of that Settlement) of the Force Entertainment Centre by Force.”

However, later a problem developed that FEC eventually settled its legal action with MTM, with MTM paying compensation in cash, without being required to purchase FEC shares. As a result, FEC denied liability for the $1,577,000 on the basis that MTM did not purchase FEC shares, which was a condition of the settlement agreement. Compcorp sued.

== Held ==
The Court held that the sale of the shares was merely a date for payment, not a condition of liability. If the shares were not purchased, it was implied that FEC would obtain monies from other sources. Gault P stated “There could hardly be a clearer case for giving a commercial contract business efficacy”.
