= Whelan v Waitaki Meats Ltd =

- Court: High Court of New Zealand
- Full case name: Whelan v Waitaki Meats Ltd
- Decided: 30 November 1990
- Citation: (1990) ERNZ Sel Co 960; [1991] 2 NZLR 74

Court membership
- Judge sitting: Gallen J

Keywords
- negligence

Whelan v Waitaki Meats Ltd (1990) ERNZ Sel Co 960; [1991] 2 NZLR 74 is a cited case in New Zealand distinguishing that Addis v Gramophone Co Ltd prohibition of the awarding of damages for distress only applies to commercial contracts, and not to employment contracts.

== Background ==
Whelen started employment at Waitaki Meats in 1959, and after 29 years of working for them, he was suddenly notified that his employment was being terminated in 4 days, although this was later extended to 16 days. Whelan found that the relatively short notice of his termination implied to the community at large that he had been dismissed for misconduct. Consequently, he sued for wrongful dismissal, and also claimed $200,000 in damages for distress for the way his employment was suddenly terminated. Waitaki defended the matter that under the 1909 case of Addis v Gramophone Co Ltd, the courts were unable to award compensation for distress, humiliation, etc., in employment cases.

== Held ==
The court found the manner of Whelan's termination "was such as to cause the plaintiff undue mental distress, anxiety, humiliation, loss of dignity and injury to his feelings". and awarded $50,000 in damages, which was a departure from Addis v Gramophone, although it was awarded for breach of contract rather than under tort. On this, Gallen J said "Addis v Gramophone Co Ltd is no more than an illustration of a principle that in commercial contracts such damages are inappropriate as not being enforceable".

Footnote: Section 123(c)(i) of the Employment Relationships Act 2000 now specifically allows the court to grant damages for humiliation and injury to feelings.
