= Ian McKay (judge) =

The Right Honourable Sir Ian McKay KNZM

Justice of the Court of Appeal
- In office 1991–1997

Personal details
- Born: 7 March 1929 Waipawa, New Zealand
- Died: 20 February 2014 (aged 84) Wellington, New Zealand

Sir Ian Lloyd McKay KNZM (7 March 1929 – 20 February 2014) was a Judge of the Court of Appeal of New Zealand from 1991 to 1997. He became a member of the Privy Council of the United Kingdom in 1992, and was president of the Electoral Commission from 1997 to 2000. In the 1998 Queen's Birthday Honours, he was appointed a Knight Companion of the New Zealand Order of Merit, for services as a judge of the Court of Appeal and to the law.

McKay died on 20 February 2014 in Wellington.
