= A v Bottrill =

- Court: Privy Council
- Full case name: “A” Appellant v Michael Bernard Bottrill Respondent
- Decided: 6 September 2002
- Citation: [2002] UKPC 44
- Transcript: High Court judgment PC judgment

Court membership
- Judges sitting: Lord Nicholls of Birkenhead, Lord Hope of Craighead, Lord Hutton, Lord Millett, Lord Rodger of Earlsferry

Keywords
- negligence

A v Bottrill [2002] UKPC 44 is a cited case in New Zealand regarding the awarding of exemplary damages.

== Background ==
Dr Bottrill was a pathologist in Gisborne. Due to his negligence, he misread A's slides for cervical cancer, resulting in her delaying her treatment.

Barred by ACC law from pursuing Bottrill in court for ordinary damages for her suffering, A instead sued him for exemplary damages, which is a far higher standard to meet.

Her High Court claim in 1999 was dismissed, as well as her subsequent appeal to the Court of Appeal.

== Decision ==
The Privy Council upheld her appeal, and referred the matter back to court. The appeal was helped by new evidence of Dr Bottrill's negligence.

Footnote: Subsequent to her 1999 claim being dismissed, it was discovered that Bottrill had misread numerous other people's slides, causing a national uproar, resulting in a Commission of Inquiry.
