= Young v New Bay Holdings Ltd =

New Zealand court case

- Court: High Court of New Zealand
- Full case name: Young v New Bay Holdings Ltd
- Citation: (1998) 3 NZ ConvC 192,808

Court membership
- Judge sitting: Randerson J

Young v New Bay Holdings Ltd (1998) 3 NZ ConvC 192,808 is a cited case in New Zealand regarding satisfying the element of detriment required under promissory estoppel.

== Background ==
Young purchased a lease of a licensed restaurant owned by New Bay Holdings Ltd for $90,000, with the lease giving Young 2 rights of renewal. He also spent a further $108,000 refurbishing the restaurant.

However, when it came time to renew the lease, NBH refused to renew the lease.

As a result, Young notified NBH's solicitors that he was going to apply to the court for relief under section 120 of the Property Law Act [1952], whereupon the solicitors advised them not to commence legal action until they had received instructions from their client.

Young resiled from filing for relief from the court, until many months later when NBH said that they could not apply for relief any longer, due to the fact that section 121 requires an application to the court within 3 months of the landlord's refusal.

Young applied for relief under promissory estoppel.

== Held ==
The judge ruled that promissory estoppel applied here, and granted a renewal of the lease. Randerson J said this was a "straightforward application of the principles of promissory estoppel".
