= Ian Henry =

English cricketer

Personal information
- Full name: Ian Clifford Henry
- Born: 23 October 1914; Kensington, London
- Died: 20 December 1999 (aged 85); Drayton Beauchamp, Buckinghamshire, England
- Batting: Right-handed
- Bowling: Leg break

Career statistics
Competition	First-class
Matches	1
Runs scored	84
Batting average	42.00
100s/50s	0/1
Top score	80
Catches/stumpings	1/–
- Source: Cricinfo, 11 April 2013

Ian Clifford Henry (23 October 1914 – 20 December 1999) was an English cricketer. Henry was a right-handed batsman who bowled leg break. He was born at Kensington, London, and was educated at Uppingham School.

Henry made a single first-class appearance for the Free Foresters against Oxford University at University Parks in 1937. In a match which Oxford University won by ten wickets, Henry top-scored with 80 in the Free Foresters first-innings, before he was dismissed by David Macindoe, while in their second-innings he was dismissed for 4 runs by Barrington Hill. This was his only first-class appearance.

He died at Drayton Beauchamp, Buckinghamshire on 20 December 1999.
