= Engineering Plastics Ltd v J Mercer & Sons Ltd =

New Zealand mutual mistake case law

- Court: High Court of New Zealand
- Full case name: Engineering Plastics Ltd v J Mercer & Sons Ltd
- Decided: 10 September 1984
- Citation: [1985] 2 NZLR 72
- Transcript: High Court judgment

Court membership
- Judge sitting: Tompkins J

Engineering Plastics Ltd v J Mercer & Sons Ltd [1985] 2 NZLR 72 is a cited case in New Zealand regarding mutual mistake.

== Background ==
J Mercer & Sons manufactured post mix drink machines used in the hospitality industry. As part of these systems, they needed O-rings.

JMS had purchased 40,000 such O-rings from an Australian supplier, all of which were quoted on a "per hundred" basis, for example orders for "3.13/HN" and "31.13 HUN".

In 1982, JMS required 4,000 O-rings of a different diameter and decided to use a NZ supplier rather than their previous Australian supplier, for which JMS were to resell at a unit price of 90 cents.

Engineering Plastics supplied the following quote: "4,000 each 3.7/16 id x 5/16 cross section, shore hardness 50, price $644.96/c, part cost tool charge $1,072,50". JMS accepted the quote, and Engineering Plastics ordered the O-rings from the US manufacturer.

However, instead of the expected invoice for $1,700, they were astonished to instead receive a bill of $27,246.42.

It later transcribed that the quote of $644.96/c was 644.96 per one hundred units, whereas JMS mistakenly thought that $644.96 was the total cost, with the "/c" being mistakenly put down to an abbreviation for "cents".

As a result, JMS were asked to pay $6.67 per O-Ring, that they normally resold for only 90 cents. The net cost of the O-rings to Engineering Plastics was $3.91, however the court received evidence that similar O-rings could have been imported from the US for only 90 cents.

After offering to return the O-rings to Engineering Plastics, which they refused, and subsequently sued JMS for payment.

JMS defended their claim, with the main one that the contract was subject to mutual mistake, and sought relief under section 6(1)(a)(iii) of the Contractual Mistakes Act 1979.

== Held ==
The judge ruled that there was a mutual mistake, namely regarding the price of the transaction. However, the judge did validate the transaction, but did grant relief to JMS by altering the unit price to $4, a figure that was arbitrarily calculated by the judge. This did allow Engineering Plastics a small profit on the transaction of 9 cents per unit.
