= Donnelly v Westpac Banking Corp =

- Court: High Court of New Zealand
- Full case name: Donnelly v Westpac Banking Corp
- Citation: (1999) 6 NZBLC 102,781

Court membership
- Judge sitting: Baragwanath J

Donnelly v Westpac Banking Corp (1999) 6 NZBLC 102,781 is a cited case in New Zealand confirming that where a party has cancelled a contract on unjustifiable grounds, can legally cancel the contract if justifiable grounds are later discovered.
