= Morrow & Benjamin Ltd v Whittington =

- Court: High Court of New Zealand
- Full case name: Morrow & Benjamin Limited v MA Whittington
- Decided: 9 July 1989
- Citation: [1989] 3 NZLR 122
- Transcript: http://www.nzlii.org/nz/cases/NZHC/1989/479.pdf

Court membership
- Judge sitting: Thorp J

Keywords
- capacity, minor

Morrow & Benjamin Ltd v Whittington [1989] 3 NZLR 122 is a case involving the enforceability of a debt incurred by a 17-year-old minor.

== Background ==
Morrow & Benjamin Ltd, a stockbroker, opened up an account for the then 15-year-old Whittington to purchase shares during the stock market boom on the mid-1980s.

While initially his credit limit was set at $3,000, it was later increased to $12,000. That being said, the now 17-year-old ignored this credit limit and the stockbroker allowed him to purchase shares worth $36,000 on the eve of the 1987 share-market crash, which were a few months later only worth $4,000.

The plaintiff then wanted him to pay his credit account of $30,250, however Whittington had no means to pay the debt.

== Held ==
While the defendant was sufficiently close to being 18 for the court to exercise its discretion to rule that the minor be liable for this debt, due to the fact that the plaintiff ignored its own credit control procedures, that it viewed the defendant at the time as being "casual and arrogant", and that the purchases were highly speculative in nature, the court held that the account was unreasonable, and so refused to make an order under section 6 of the Minors Contract Act for the debt to be repaid.
