= Hawker v Vickers =

- Court: High Court of New Zealand
- Full case name: Hawker v Vickers
- Decided: 19 December 1989
- Citation: [1991] 1 NZLR 399
- Transcript: http://www.nzlii.org/cgi-bin/sinodisp/nz/cases/NZHC/1989/988.pdf

Hawker v Vickers [1991] 1 NZLR 399 is a cited case in New Zealand regarding property law.
