= Cook Islands Shipping Co Ltd v Colson Builders Ltd =

- Court: High Court of New Zealand
- Full case name: Cook Islands Shipping Company Limited v Colson Builders Limited
- Decided: 9 September 1974
- Citation: [1975] 1 NZLR 422

Court membership
- Judge sitting: Mahon J

Cook Islands Shipping Co Ltd v Colson Builders Ltd [1975] 1 NZLR 422 is a cited case in New Zealand regarding performance of an existing contractual duty to a promisor in economic duress. This case reinforces the English case of Stilk v Myrick (1809) 2 Camp 317; 170 ER 1168

== Background ==
In 1971, Colson Builders were building a new hangar for Air New Zealand in Rarotonga in the Cook Islands. For the build, they needed 1,800 tons of building materials to be shipped from Portland Oregon, consisting mainly of cement and steel.

CIS quoted $4,463 for the shipping of the 158 tons of the steel required for the project, which CIS had quoted by using a "deadweight" basis. However, the steel for the project was prefabricated sections, which were far more bulky than plain flat steel, and so more onerous to the shipper, and so informed Colson that they would need to pay $13,265.39 for the freight.

== Held ==
The court held that the increased price was economic duress, and so not legally enforceable.
