= Brown & Doherty Ltd v Whangarei County Council =

- Court: High Court of New Zealand
- Full case name: Brown & Doherty Ltd v Whangarei County Council
- Decided: 17 February 1988
- Citation: [1990] 2 NZLR 63
- Transcript: High Court judgment

Court membership
- Judge sitting: Smellie J

Brown & Doherty Ltd v Whangarei County Council [1990] 2 NZLR 63 is a cited case in New Zealand regarding quantum meruit.
