= Cross v Aurora Group Ltd =

New Zealand court case

- Court: High Court of New Zealand
- Full case name: Peter Glen Cross (First Plaintiff) and Cross Property Management Limited v Aurora Group Ltd
- Decided: 15 December 1988
- Citation: (1989) 4 NZCLC 64,909
- Transcript: High Court judgment

Court membership
- Judge sitting: Wylie J

Cross v Aurora Group Ltd (1989) 4 NZCLC 64,909 is a cited case in New Zealand regarding the Contracts (Privity) Act 1982 and pre-incorporation contracts.

== Background ==
In 1987, Peter Cross negotiated a contract for property management services to Aurora Group, and planned to use a company structure for the contract.

The contract stated that it was "Cross Property Management Limited a company currently being formed", and soon after. Cross's lawyers changed a name of a holding company named Felstead limited, to Cross Property Management Limited.

Later, when the new company tried to ratify the contract, Aurora refused to accept it, and as a result CPM sued to enforce the contract.

== Held ==
CPM's claim failed. Wylie J stated "Designation is a strong word, a positive word and means something more than a mere contemplation or possibility".
