= Lundberg v Royal Exchange Assurance Corp =

- Court: High Court of New Zealand
- Full case name: Lundberg v Royal Exchange Assurance Corp
- Decided: 7 June 1933
- Citation: [1933] NZLR 605

Court membership
- Judge sitting: Reed J

Lundberg v Royal Exchange Assurance Corp [1933] NZLR 605 is a cited case in New Zealand confirming that an offerer can waive the right to communication that a party has accepted their offer.
