= General Finance Acceptance Ltd v Melrose =

- Court: High Court of New Zealand
- Full case name: General Finance Acceptance Limited v Melrose
- Decided: 24 August 1987
- Citation: [1988] 1 NZLR 465

Court membership
- Judge sitting: Smellie J

Keywords
- liquidated damages, penalty

General Finance Acceptance Ltd v Melrose [1988] 1 NZLR 465 is an often cited case regarding whether a contract term for calculating damages in the future are what is called liquidated damages (i.e. is a genuine pre estimate of damages), or is otherwise deemed a penalty clause, which the courts do not uphold as legally enforceable.

== Background ==
General Finance Acceptance (GFA) leased a computer to Melrose on a five-year term, with the leasing contract having the term that upon default, that Melrose would pay all the remaining lease payments less the cost of the computer at the date of cancellation, plus interest on top of al this at 32% per annum.

Melrose cancelled the contract early, and was billed by GFA for this default as per the default clause in the lease agreement, even though these damages were far higher than Melrose would have paid had the lease gone the whole five-year term, and they disputed liability for these damages.

== Held ==
The court held that as the damages claimed by GFA were in excess of what they would have received from the lease had it gone the full five years, and ruled that the default clause was not liquidated damages, but instead were penal in nature, and accordingly GFA's damages claim here was not legally enforceable. As GFA were effectively claiming 2 lots of interest for the same period, one lot of interest contained in the remaining lease payments, and a second a default interest of 32%, meant that the default interest was not enforceable in the first place, not requiring the court to consider whether the rate of 32% was excessive.
