= Shattock v Devlin =

- Court: High Court of New Zealand
- Full case name: W R Shattock (senior) First Plaintiff, B A Clements Second Plaintiff, W R Shattock (junior) Third Plaintiff v E J Devlin First Defendant, J P McDonnell Second Defendant, The Attorney-General sued in respect of the New Zealand Police Third Defendant
- Decided: 8 January 1990
- Citation: [1990] 2 NZLR 88

Court membership
- Judge sitting: Wylie J

Keywords
- negligence

Shattock v Devlin [1990] 2 NZLR 88 is a cited case in New Zealand regarding the defence of Implied license to enter a property to a trespass claim.
