= Rectification (law) =

Court-ordered change to a written document

Rectification is a remedy whereby a court orders a change in a written document to reflect what it ought to have said in the first place. It is an equitable remedy, and so the circumstances on which it can be applied are limited.

In the United States, the remedy is commonly referred to as reformation.

== England ==
In English law, the rule was summarised in Fowler v Fowler (1859) 4 DeG & J 250 at 264:

"Only after the court has been satisfied by evidence which leaves no 'fair and reasonable doubt' that the deed impeached does not embody the final intention of the parties. This evidence must make it clear that the alleged intention to which the plaintiff asks that the deed be made to conform, continued concurrently in the minds of all the parties down to the time of its execution; and the plaintiff must succeed in showing also the precise form in which the instrument will express this intention."

A less-demanding process following the contractual construction principle of misnomer is also available under English law.

== Scotland ==
In Scots Law, unlike English law above, did not traditionally recognise the remedy of rectification. In cases where the parties had made a mistake, they could seek reduction of the contract, or interpretation by the court. This state of the law was generally seen as unsatisfactory.

This led to the introduction of Section 8 of the Law Reform (Miscellaneous Provisions) (Scotland) Act 1985

The general provision for rectification is as follows:

"(1) Subject to section 9 of this Act, where the court is satisfied, on an application made to it, that—

(a) a document intended to express or to give effect to an agreement fails to express accurately the common intention of the parties to the agreement at the date when it was made; or

(b) a document intended to create, transfer, vary or renounce a right, not being a document falling within paragraph (a) above, fails to express accurately the intention of the grantor of the document at the date when it was executed,

it may order the document to be rectified in any manner that it may specify in order to give effect to that intention.

(2) For the purposes of subsection (1) above, the court shall be entitled to have regard to all relevant evidence, whether written or oral."

The wording of the provision logically leads to two scenarios.

1. The rectification of documents giving effect to a prior bilateral agreement, where there has been a mistake in expression
2. The rectification of unilateral documents, where the granter has failed to express their intention

Testamentary documents are excluded from this provision under section 8(6).

=== Effect ===
Section 8(4) of the act provides that

"(4) Subject to sections 8A and 9(4) of this Act, a document ordered to be rectified under this section shall have effect as if it had always been so rectified."

This provision is thus retroactive, and thus remedies for breach of the rectified term prior to the rectification may be available.

=== Objectivity and Subjectivity ===
In relation to documents giving effect to bilateral agreements, in the case of Paterson v Angelline [2022] CSIH 33, the judgement of Lady Wolffe clarifies that the objective approach must be taken. That is to say, that the contents of the previous agreement, and the intention that it is expressed in the document to be rectified must be ascertained from the perspective of the reasonable observer.

In relation to unilateral documents, the approach is the converse. In the case of PHG Developments Scot Ltd v Lothian Amusements Ltd [2021] CSIH 12, Lord Tyre sets out that the relevant intention is subjective (endorsing the outer house judgement of Bank of Ireland v Bass Brewers) - what legal effect the granter intended to achieve.

== Canada ==
In the Canadian case of Bercovici v Palmer (1966) 59 DLR (2d) 513, a lawyer's "inexplicable error" extended a conveyance of real property to include a cottage. One of the parties later tried to assert that the inclusion was intended, but the trial judge did not believe that evidence and concluded that he was "satisfied beyond any fair and reasonable doubt that the (cottage) was not intended by either party to be included in their transaction."

On appeal, the court added that in cases if rectification is an issue, it is within the purview of the court to consider the conduct subsequent to the contract.

== Australia ==
Rectification is available if the parties intended to give effect to the whole of an antecedent agreement in the written contract and, by common mistake, they failed to do so. However, the existence of an antecedent agreement is not essential to the grant of relief by way of rectification. It may be granted in cases in which the instrument sought to be rectified constitutes the only agreement between the parties but does not reflect their common intention. The plaintiff needs to advance 'convincing proof' that the written contract does not embody the final intention of the parties. The omitted ingredient must be capable of such proof in clear and precise terms.

== New Zealand ==
In New Zealand law, the precedent is Wrightson Ltd MREINZ v Clapham.

== See also ==
- Bird, Roger: Osborn's Concise Law Dictionary, London, Sweet & Maxwell
