= Owen Woodhouse =

New Zealand jurist

The Right Honourable Sir Owen Woodhouse ONZ KBE DSC
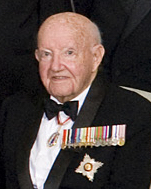
- Woodhouse in 2009

President of the Court of Appeal
- In office 1981–1986
- Preceded by: Clifford Richmond
- Succeeded by: Robin Cooke

Personal details
- Born: 18 July 1916 Napier, New Zealand
- Died: 15 April 2014 (aged 97) Auckland, New Zealand

Sir Arthur Owen Woodhouse ONZ KBE DSC (18 July 1916 – 15 April 2014) was a New Zealand jurist and chair of government commissions.

== Biography ==
Woodhouse was born in Napier in 1916 and completed an LL.B. at the University of Auckland in 1940. He served as a Lieutenant Commander in the Royal New Zealand Naval Volunteer Reserve during World War II on motor torpedo boats and was a liaison officer with the Yugoslav Partisan in 1943. Two years later, he was serving at the British Embassy in Belgrade as assistant to the Naval Attaché. He received the Distinguished Service Cross in 1944 for naval operations in the Adriatic.

Woodhouse was appointed a Judge of the New Zealand Supreme Court in 1961, and then the New Zealand Court of Appeal in 1974. The same year, he became a Privy Counsellor on the Judicial Committee. He was President of the Court of Appeal from 1981 until his retirement in 1986, after which he was appointed President of the Law Commission until 1991.

Woodhouse was the Chairman of the Royal Commission on Accident Compensation from 1966 to 1967, which produced the Woodhouse Report that recommended a “no-fault” accident compensation scheme. The scheme, known as ACC after its controlling entity, the Accident Compensation Commission (later Corporation), came into effect in April 1974. He was commissioned in 1974 by the Australian Government, the result being the Report of the National Committee of Inquiry, "Compensation and Rehabilitation in Australia", now known as the Australian Woodhouse Report. In 1987, he was President of the Law Commission when it was asked to review parts of the accident compensation legislation, but without examining underlying principle. The Commission's report, "Personal Injury: Prevention and Recovery", was published in 1988 and recommended an end to the disparities between the treatment of accident victims and those incapacitated by sickness or disease.

== Honours and awards ==
Woodhouse's achievements were recognised by the award of honorary Doctor of Law degrees by Victoria University of Wellington and York University, Toronto, in 1978 and 1981, respectively. He was appointed a Knight Bachelor in 1974, a Knight Commander of the Order of the British Empire in the 1981 Queen's Birthday Honours, and an additional Member of the Order of New Zealand in 2007.

== Death and legacy ==
Woodhouse died on 15 April 2014 at the age of 97, and was buried at Purewa Cemetery. Parliament interrupted its proceedings to hold a moment's silence in his honour. Prime Minister John Key said that "Sir Owen Woodhouse was a man whose life exemplified public service and duty to his country...He leaves a genuinely important legacy." Leader of the Opposition David Cunliffe described Woodhouse as a "great New Zealander", saying that "Sir Owen’s selfless contributions to public life have been immeasurable... New Zealanders owe a special debt of gratitude to Sir Owen for his ground-breaking work as chairman of the Royal Commission on Accident Compensation from 1966 to 1967." Chief Justice Dame Sian Elias said that Woodhouse "was an outstanding jurist with a passion for social justice. He was a reformer and a great New Zealander." The President of the New Zealand Law Society, Chris Moore, called him "one of [New Zealand's] greatest jurists". Former Prime Minister Sir Geoffrey Palmer, for whom Woodhouse was a mentor and friend, stated that he "was a man of astonishing intelligence and wonderful humanity."

In May 2014, ACC dedicated the "Sir Owen Woodhouse Atrium" at its Wellington national office in his memory.

== Family ==
In 1940, Woodhouse married Margaret Leah Thorp. They had four sons and two daughters. His son, Peter Woodhouse, has been a High Court judge since August 2007.
