= Edward Somers =

New Zealand jurist

The Right Honourable Sir Edward Jonathan Somers PC QC

Non-Permanent Judge of the Hong Kong Court of Final Appeal
- In office 1997–2002
- Appointed by: Tung Chee Hwa

Judge of the New Zealand Court of Appeal
- In office 1981–1990

Judge of the New Zealand Supreme Court
- In office 1974–1981

Personal details
- Born: New Zealand
- Education: University of Canterbury

Sir Edward Jonathan Somers PC QC (9 September 1928 – 3 June 2002) was a New Zealand jurist and member of the Privy Council.

== Biography ==
Somers was born in Christchurch in 1928, and was educated at Christ's College and the University of Canterbury, where he gained a Bachelor of Arts and a Bachelor of Laws. In 1952, Somers became engaged to Mollie Louise Morison, and they later married and went on to have three children.

Somers practised as a barrister and solicitor between 1952 and 1971, and solely as a barrister thereafter. In 1973, he was appointed Queen's Counsel, and the following year he became a judge of the Supreme Court (now High Court). He was appointed a judge of the Court of Appeal in 1981, a role from which he retired in 1990. In 1981, he was also appointed to the Privy Council.

Somers was a part-time lecturer at the University of Canterbury from 1954 to 1974.

In 1998, Somers was appointed by the British government to be a member of the Bloody Sunday Inquiry. He resigned from that role for personal reasons in 2000.

Somers died of cancer in Christchurch in 2002. His wife, Louise, Lady Somers, died in Christchurch in 2021.

== Honours ==
In the 1989 Queen's Birthday Honours, Somers was appointed a Knight Bachelor. He was awarded an honorary Doctor of Laws by the University of Canterbury in 1992.
