= John Henry (judge) =

New Zealand judge (1932–2026)

Sir John Steele Henry KNZM KC PC (3 July 1932 – 24 July 2026) was a New Zealand lawyer and jurist. He served as a Court of Appeal judge from 1991 to 2004, and was a member of the well-known Henry family.

== Life and career ==
Henry was born in Auckland on 3 July 1932, the son of former High Court judge, Trevor Henry. He was educated at King's College, Auckland, before attending Law School at the University of Auckland. He graduated with a Bachelor of Laws degree in 1954 and was admitted to the New Zealand bar the following year.

In 1957, Henry married Jennefer Lynne Stevenson. They had one son and two daughters.

He worked as a barrister and solicitor at the Henry family law firm, Wilson Henry (now Hesketh Henry) that was established by his father, and gained a reputation as a robust litigator, building a substantial commercial litigation team at the firm. He was appointed Queen's Counsel in 1980.

In 1984, Henry was appointed to the bench of the High Court of New Zealand, later being a Commercial List Judge and then Executive Judge prior to being appointed to the Criminal Appeal Division of the Court of Appeal in 1991 and Justice of the Court of Appeal of New Zealand in 1995.

In 1996, Henry became a member of the Privy Council and sat on its Judicial Committee. He was also a justice of the High Court of the Cook Islands.

In 1990, Henry was awarded the New Zealand 1990 Commemoration Medal. In the 2001 Queen's Birthday Honours, Henry was appointed a Distinguished Companion of the New Zealand Order of Merit, for services as a judge of the Court of Appeal. In 2009, following the restoration of titular honours by the New Zealand government, he accepted redesignation as a Knight Companion of the New Zealand Order of Merit.

Henry died on 24 July 2026, at the age of 94.
