= Duncan McMullin =

New Zealand judge

The Right Honourable Sir Duncan McMullin

Personal details
- Born: Duncan Wallace McMullin; 1 May 1927 Auckland, New Zealand
- Died: 26 June 2017 (aged 90) Auckland, New Zealand
- Occupation: Judge of the Court of Appeal
- Known for: Chair of the Royal Commission on Contraception, Sterilisation and Abortion

Sir Duncan Wallace McMullin PC (1 May 1927 – 26 June 2017) was a New Zealand jurist. He was a judge of the Court of Appeal of New Zealand, Court of Appeal of Fiji and Cook Islands Court of Appeal.

== Early life and family ==
Born in the Auckland suburb of Mount Eden on 1 May 1927, McMullin was the son of Charles James McMullin and Kathleen Annie McMullin (née Shout). He was educated at Auckland Grammar School from 1940, and went on to study at Auckland University College, from where he graduated LLB in 1950. He married Isobel Margaret Atkinson in about 1954, and they had four children.

== Career ==
Following his graduation, McMullin practised as a barrister and solicitor before serving as a judge of the Supreme Court (now the High Court) and the Court of Appeal. He chaired the Royal Commission on Contraception, Sterilisation and Abortion between 1975 and 1977, and also served as chair of the Wanganui Computer Centre policy committee, the New Zealand Conservation Authority, and the Market Surveillance Committee for the New Zealand Electricity Market.

McMullin was appointed as a member of the Judicial Committee of the Privy Council on 21 May 1980.

Other roles included chairing the judicial commission of the Presbyterian Church of Aotearoa New Zealand, and membership of the New Zealand Stock Exchange standing committee.

== Honours ==
In the 1987 New Year Honours, McMullin was appointed a Knight Bachelor, in recognition of his role as a judge of the Court of Appeal. He was conferred with his knighthood at Buckingham Palace on 22 July 1987.

== Death ==
McMullin died on 26 June 2017. His wife, Isobel, Lady McMullin, died in 2023.
