= Andrew Tipping =

New Zealand judge

The Right Honourable Sir Andrew Tipping KNZM

Justice of the Supreme Court of New Zealand
- In office 1 January 2004 – 21 August 2012
- Nominated by: Helen Clark
- Appointed by: Silvia Cartwright
- Preceded by: Position Established
- Succeeded by: Robert Chambers

Justice of the Court of Appeal of New Zealand
- In office 1 June 1997 – 1 January 2004
- Nominated by: Jim Bolger
- Appointed by: Michael Hardie Boys

Justice of the High Court of New Zealand
- In office October 1986 – 1 June 1997

Personal details
- Born: 22 August 1942 (age 84) Oxford, England
- Spouse(s): Judith Ann Oliver (1967 to her death in 2010), Mary Jo Nicholson (2012–)
- Children: 3
- Education: University of Canterbury
- Awards: Canterbury District Law Society’s Gold Medal; Sir Timothy Cleary Memorial Prize

Sir Andrew Patrick Charles Tipping (/ændru tɪpɪŋ/; born 22 August 1942) is a New Zealand jurist who served as a Justice of the Supreme Court of New Zealand from 2004 until his retirement in 2012. He is New Zealand's longest-serving judge, serving on the bench for 25 years. Tipping was also a member of the Privy Council of the United Kingdom. His tenure as a jurist has been widely acclaimed and his contributions to the shaping of New Zealand law are considered to be substantial and permanent.

== Early life ==
Born in Oxford, England, Tipping came to New Zealand at an early age. He was educated at Cheltenham College, England, and then at Christ’s College and the University of Canterbury. He graduated with a Bachelor of Arts degree majoring in classics, a Bachelor of Laws degree, and then Master of Laws with first-class honours.

== Career ==
He practiced as a common law partner in the Christchurch firm of Wynn Williams & Co. He was President of the Canterbury District Law Society in 1984 and a council member of the New Zealand Law Society from 1982–1984. In 1986, he was appointed to the High Court. He was promoted to the Court of Appeal on 1 June 1997, and appointed to the Privy Council a year later. In the Court of Appeal he was a member of the court that said the Maori Land Court had jurisdiction to decide the status of the foreshore and seabed in Ngati Apa v Attorney-General.

From 2004 the Privy Council was replaced as New Zealand’s highest appellate court by a Supreme Court of New Zealand, with the passage of the Supreme Court Act 2003. Attorney General Margaret Wilson was tasked with appointing the entire bench simultaneously, She announced that the appointments would be based on merit and seniority. This meant on 1 January 2004, Tipping became one of the initial members of the new Supreme Court of New Zealand as the most senior Justices on the Court of Appeal were appointed to the new Court.

Tipping retired from the Supreme Court on 17 August 2012. On 20 September 2012 Tipping was appointed an Acting Judge of the Supreme Court. He retired as an Acting Judge of the Supreme Court in August 2017 upon reaching the statutory retirement age.

In the 2006 New Year Honours, Tipping was appointed a Distinguished Companion of the New Zealand Order of Merit, for services as a judge of the Supreme Court and Court of Appeal of New Zealand. In the 2009 Special Honours he accepted re-designation as a Knight Companion of the New Zealand Order of Merit following the re-introduction of titular honours by the New Zealand government.
