= Kenneth Keith =

New Zealand judge (1937–2026)

The Right Honourable Sir Kenneth Keith ONZ KBE KC PC
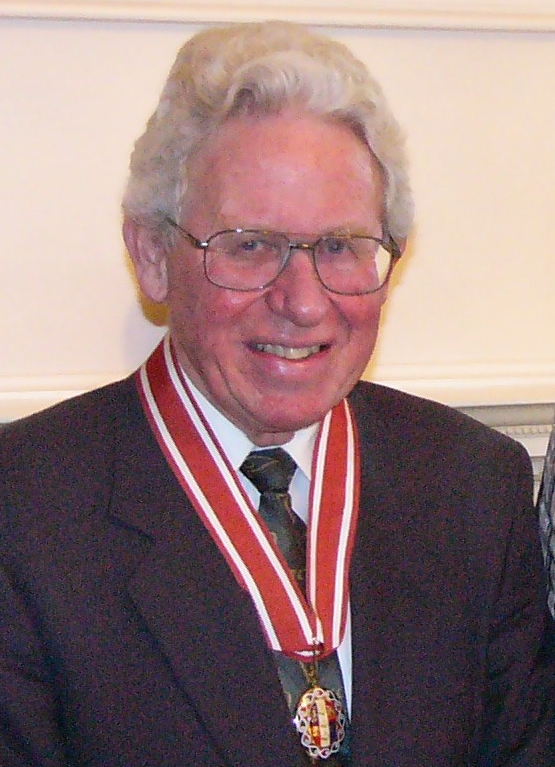
- Keith in 2007

Justice of the Supreme Court
- In office 1 January 2004 – 18 November 2005

Personal details
- Born: 19 November 1937 Auckland, New Zealand
- Died: 13 May 2026 (aged 88) Wellington, New Zealand
- Spouse: Jocelyn Buckett (m. 1961)
- Children: 4, including Judi
- Education: Victoria University College; Harvard University; University of Auckland
- Profession: Lawyer; judge

Sir Kenneth James Keith ONZ KBE KC PC (19 November 1937 – 13 May 2026) was a New Zealand jurist and legal scholar. He was elected to the International Court of Justice in November 2005 and served a nine-year term from 2006 to 2015.

== Early life and education ==
Keith was born in Auckland on 19 November 1937, and educated at Auckland Grammar School. He went on to study law at the University of Auckland and Victoria University of Wellington, graduating with a Bachelor of Laws degree in 1961 and a Master of Laws degree in 1964, before undertaking further study at Harvard Law School from 1964 to 1965.

== Career ==
Admitted to the New Zealand Bar in 1961, Keith was employed by the Department of External Affairs from 1962 to 1964. He was a faculty member of Victoria University of Wellington from 1962 to 1964, and from 1966 to 1991, rising to become a full professor in 1974, and serving as dean of law between 1977 and 1981. He was a member of the United Nations Secretariat from 1968 to 1970, and director of the New Zealand Institute of International Affairs from 1972 to 1974.

From 1982, Keith sat (as required) as a judge of appeal in Samoa and the Cook Islands.

In 1991, Keith became president of the New Zealand Law Commission, and he was a member of the Royal Commission on the Electoral System that was key in changing New Zealand's electoral system. In 1993, he was a member of the Working Party on the Reorganisation of the Income Tax Act 1976 which was instrumental in launching a fundamental reform of the way in which New Zealand tax legislation was written.

Keith was appointed Queen's Counsel in 1994. From 1995, he sat as appeal in Niue. In 1996, he was appointed to the bench in New Zealand as a judge of both the High Court and the Court of Appeal, and on 21 May 1998, he was appointed to the Privy Council. From 2003, Keith served a judge of the Supreme Court of Fiji, and he has also sat as the chair of a North American Free Trade Agreement (NAFTA) tribunal (UPS v Canada).

In 2004, Keith was one of the inaugural appointments to the new Supreme Court of New Zealand, which replaced the Judicial Committee of the Privy Council as New Zealand's highest court from 1 July 2004.

In 2006, Keith became the first New Zealander to be elected to the International Court of Justice (ICJ), having previously presented as a member of the New Zealand legal team in the Nuclear Tests cases before the ICJ in 1973, 1974 and 1995. He served until 2015. Keith subsequently served as a judge ad hoc in two cases before the ICJ, appointed by Azerbaijan. He resigned from these positions on 21 April 2023, and was replaced by Judge Abdul G. Koroma.

== Personal life and death ==
In 1961, Keith married Jocelyn Margaret Buckett, and the couple went on to have four children, including architect Judi Keith-Brown.

Keith died in Wellington on 13 May 2026, at the age of 88.

== Honours and awards ==
In the 1988 Queen's Birthday Honours, Keith was appointed a Knight Commander of the Order of the British Empire, for services to law reform and legal education. In 1990, he was awarded the New Zealand 1990 Commemoration Medal. In the 2007 Queen's Birthday Honours, he was appointed a Member of the Order of New Zealand.

Legal offices
Preceded by Pieter Kooijmans	Judge of International Court of Justice; 2006–2015	Succeeded by James Crawford
