= Peter Blanchard =

New Zealand judge

The Right Honourable Sir Peter Blanchard KNZM PC

Justice of the Supreme Court
- In office 1 January 2004 – 24 June 2012

Personal details
- Born: 2 August 1942 (age 84) Auckland, New Zealand
- Education: University of Auckland; Harvard University
- Profession: Lawyer

Sir Peter Blanchard KNZM PC (born 2 August 1942) is a former judge of the Supreme Court of New Zealand.

== Biography ==
Blanchard was born in the Auckland suburb of Epsom on 2 August 1942, the son of Cyril and Zora Blanchard. His father served as a flying officer with the Royal New Zealand Air Force during World War II, and died during air operations over Germany on 26 May 1943.

In 1968, Blanchard received a Master of Laws degree from the University of Auckland Law School. He was then awarded a Fulbright Scholarship and a Frank Knox Memorial Fellowship from Harvard Law School where he received a master's degree in law. He specialised in commercial, insolvency and property law as a partner at the Auckland law firms of Grierson Jackson & Partners (1968–1983) and Simpson Grierson (1983 to 1992).

In 1992, Blanchard was appointed as a judge of the High Court of New Zealand and in 1996, he was appointed as a judge of the Court of Appeal of New Zealand.

In 1998 Blanchard was appointed as a New Zealand member of the Privy Council and in 2004 was appointed to the Supreme Court of New Zealand. Appointment to the Privy Council grants the right to use the style of The Right Honourable so Blanchard became The Right Honourable Justice Blanchard.

In the 2005 New Year Honours, Blanchard was appointed a Distinguished Companion of the New Zealand Order of Merit, for services to the judiciary, and in 2009 he accepted redesignation as a Knight Companion of the New Zealand Order of Merit following the reintroduction of titular honours by the government.

Blanchard has also served as an expatriate justice of the Supreme Court of Fiji and the Court of Appeal of Kiribati. On 4 August 2021 he was appointed as an acting judge of the Supreme Court of Samoa for a term of two years.

He also serves as a commercial court judge, applying English Common Law, on the ADGM (Abu Dhabi Global Market) Courts.
