= Thomas Gault =

New Zealand jurist (1938–2015)

The Right Honourable Sir Thomas Gault KNZM QC

President of the Court of Appeal
- In office 2002–2003
- Preceded by: Sir Ivor Richardson
- Succeeded by: Noel Anderson

Personal details
- Born: Thomas Munro Gault; 31 October 1938
- Died: 19 May 2015 (aged 76) Auckland, New Zealand

Sir Thomas Munro Gault KNZM QC PC (Chinese: 高禮哲, 31 October 1938 – 19 May 2015) was a New Zealand jurist. He was a Justice of the Supreme Court of New Zealand and a member of the Privy Council of the United Kingdom as well as a non-permanent judge of the Court of Final Appeal in Hong Kong. He was also a justice of the Supreme Court of Fiji.

Gault attended Wellington College and graduated with a Master of Laws degree from Victoria University of Wellington. After graduation, he was a member of the law firm A J Park & Son for 20 years. In 1981, he began practising as a barrister sole, and in 1984 he was appointed a Queen's Counsel.

His first appointment to the bench was as a Judge of the High Court in 1987, followed three years later by being made a member of the Court of Appeal. He was appointed President of the Court of Appeal in May 2002.

In the 2001 New Year Honours, Gault was appointed a Distinguished Companion of the New Zealand Order of Merit, for services to the judiciary. In the 2009 Special Honours, he accepted re-designation as a Knight Companion of the New Zealand Order of Merit following the restoration of titular honours by the New Zealand government.

A keen golfer, Gault won the New Zealand Universities' Championship, and was awarded Blues by both Victoria University and the University of New Zealand. Moving into the administration of the game, he was President of the New Zealand Golf Association from 1987 to 1996 and as an Advisory Member of the Rules of Golf and Amateur Status Committees from 1978 to 1996. He was referee for The Open Championship from 1993 to 1998. He joined The Royal and Ancient Golf Club of St Andrews in 1994, and was made its first New Zealand captain in September 2005.

Gault died at home in Auckland in 2015.
