= Ivor Richardson =

New Zealand jurist, President of the Court of Appeal (1996–2002)

The Right Honourable Sir Ivor Richardson PCNZM

President of the Court of Appeal of New Zealand
- In office 1996–2002
- Appointed by: Jim Bolger
- Preceded by: Robin Cooke
- Succeeded by: Thomas Gault

Justice of the Court of Appeal of New Zealand
- In office 1978–1996
- Appointed by: Robert Muldoon

Justice of the High Court of New Zealand
- In office 1977–1978
- Appointed by: Robert Muldoon

Personal details
- Born: 24 May 1930 Ashburton, New Zealand
- Died: 29 December 2014 (aged 84)
- Education: University of Canterbury (LLB) University of Michigan (LLM & SJD)

Sir Ivor Lloyd Morgan Richardson PCNZM PC (24 May 1930 – 29 December 2014) was an eminent New Zealand and Commonwealth jurist and legal writer and a member of the Judicial Committee of the Privy Council.

== Education ==
He was a student at Timaru Boys' High School, Timaru, New Zealand. He graduated from Canterbury University College (now the University of Canterbury), Christchurch, in 1949 with an LL.B. degree. He went on to study at the University of Michigan in the United States, from where he graduated with an LL.M. degree and an SJD degree.

== Career ==
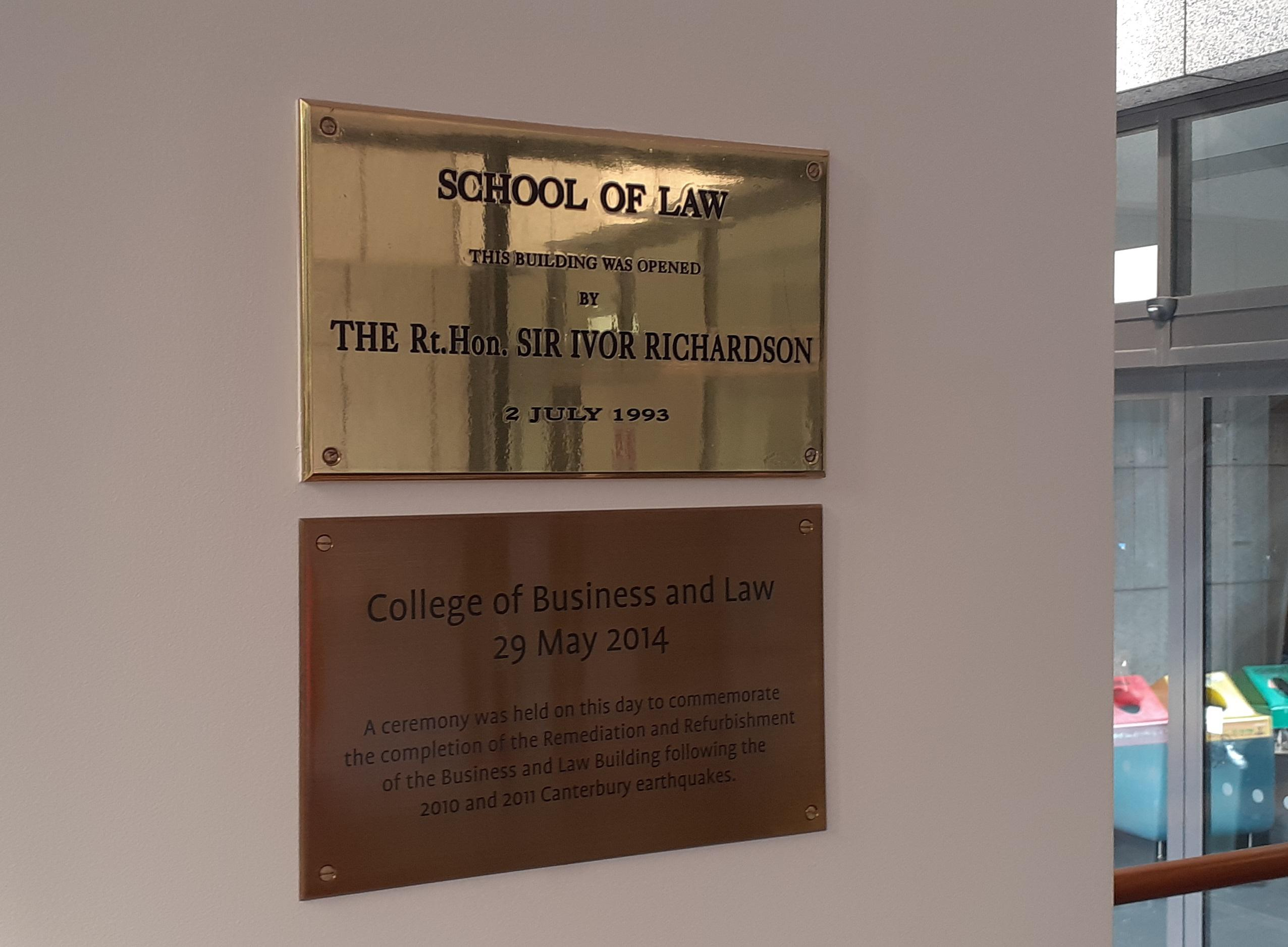
Commemorative plaque in the Business and Law college at the University of Canterbury, for the opening of the building in 1993 by Richardson.

Richardson was a partner in the Invercargill firm of Macalister Brothers from 1957 to 1963. From 1963 to 1966, he was Crown Counsel in the Crown Law Office in Wellington. He then joined the Victoria University of Wellington. He was Professor of Law, between 1967 and 1973, during which period he served as Dean of the Law Faculty from 1968 to 1971.

After a period back in public practice in Wellington he was appointed as a judge in the High Court of New Zealand in 1977 and subsequently to the Court of Appeal in the same year. He was invested as a Privy Councillor in 1978. In 2003 he was appointed to the Hong Kong Court of Final Appeal.

He was a Distinguished Fellow at Victoria University.

== Influence on New Zealand taxation ==
Richardson has had significant impact on the development of New Zealand tax law and policy. During his time on the Court of Appeal he delivered most of the majority decisions on the significant tax cases of the time. For example, his ruling in CIR v Farmers' Trading Co Ltd (1982) 5 NZTC 61,200 was instrumental in the development of reference to accounting concepts in determining taxable income.

He wrote or presented a number of influential papers, particularly on the development of theories around tax avoidance and was an important part of the reforms of the 1980s (see, for example, the First Report of the Working Party on the Reorganisation of the Income Tax Act 1976).

== Legal service ==
Richardson was the Chairman of the Council of Legal Education from 1983 to 1992. He also served as Pro Chancellor (1979 to 1984) and Chancellor (1984 to 1986) of the Victoria University of Wellington.

== Death ==
Richardson died on 29 December 2014, aged 84.

== Other service ==
Richardson chaired or served on numerous government committees and commissions. Notable among them were:

- Commission of Inquiry into Inflation Accounting (1975–76)
- Committee of Inquiry into Solicitors' Nominee Companies (1982)
- Royal Commission on Social Policy (Te Komihana a te Karauna mo nga Ahuatanga-A-Iwi) (1986–88), Vol.1
- Organisational Review of Inland Revenue Department (1993–94)
- Rewrite Advisory Panel (2003–08)

== Honours and awards ==
Richardson was conferred with honorary Doctor of Laws degrees by the University of Canterbury in 1987 and Victoria University of Wellington in 1989.

In the 1986 Queen's Birthday Honours, Richardson was appointed a Knight Bachelor, and in the 2002 Queen's Birthday and Golden Jubilee Honours, he was made a Principal Companion of the New Zealand Order of Merit, for services as president of the Court of Appeal of New Zealand.
