= Court of Appeal of New Zealand =

New Zealand's main intermediate appellate court

- Te Kōti Pīra o Aotearoa (Māori)
- Interactive map of Court of Appeal of New Zealand
- Established: 1862
- Jurisdiction: New Zealand
- Location: Cnr Molesworth & Aitken Streets, Wellington
- Composition method: Appointed by the Governor-General on the advice of the Attorney-General
- Authorised by: Senior Courts Act 2016
- Appeals to: Supreme Court of New Zealand
- Appeals from: District Court; High Court; Employment Court
- Number of positions: 10
- Website: courtsofnz.govt.nz

President of the Court of Appeal of New Zealand
- Currently: The Hon. Justice Christine French
- Since: 21 November 2024

The Court of Appeal of New Zealand (Māori: Te Kōti Pīra o Aotearoa) is the principal intermediate appellate court of New Zealand. It is also the final appellate court for a number of matters. In practice, most appeals are resolved at this intermediate appellate level, rather than in the Supreme Court. The Court of Appeal has existed as a separate court since 1862 but, until 1957, it was composed of judges of the High Court sitting periodically in panels. In 1957 the Court of Appeal was reconstituted as a permanent court separate from the High Court. It is located in Wellington.

== The Court and its work ==
The President and up to nine other permanent appellate judges constitute the full-time working membership of the Court of Appeal.

The court sits in panels of five judges or three judges, depending on the nature and wider significance of the particular case:

- Full Court means a panel of five permanent or acting judges of the Court.
- Permanent Court means a panel of three permanent or acting judges of the Court.
- Divisional Court means a panel of one permanent or acting judge of the Court of Appeal and two High Court judges. High Court judges are seconded for a period of one or two weeks to sit on Divisional Courts, and will normally be assigned to sit for the duration on either the Civil Appeals Division or the Criminal Appeals Division.

The type of court hearing the appeal does not affect the status of the decision.

In the main, criminal appeals will be allocated to a Divisional Court unless the President otherwise directs. This recognises the insights which judges with current trial experience bring to criminal appeals. Counsel for the appellant or respondent may request a direction that a particular appeal be instead allocated to a Permanent Court or a Full Court.

Longer civil appeals or areas that raise legal issues of public significance will usually be allocated to a Permanent Court. Appeals from decisions of associate judges of the High Court and shorter civil appeals that raise mainly factual issues, usually will be allocated to a Divisional Court unless the President otherwise directs. Again counsel for the appellant or respondent may request a direction that a particular appeal be allocated to a Divisional Court, a Permanent Court, or a Full Court.

The President will determine whether an appeal (criminal or civil) is of sufficient significance to warrant the consideration of a Full Court of five members. The President will, where appropriate, consult with other permanent judges. Such a decision typically is made only once or twice a year.

=== How cases come to the court ===
The Court of Appeal deals with civil and criminal appeals from matters heard in the High Court, and serious criminal charges from the District Court. Matters appealed to the High Court from the District Court (including the Family Court), the Environment Court and certain tribunals can be taken to the Court of Appeal with leave, if a second appeal is warranted. The court may also grant leave to hear appeals against pre-trial rulings in criminal cases, and appeals on questions of law from the Employment Court.

The court sits as a Permanent Court in Wellington in "sessions" lasting three weeks. These are followed by two "circuit" weeks, in which members of the Permanent Court either sit in Divisional Courts or else write judgments. Divisional Courts are conducted on circuit – in the regions. There are approximately forty Divisional Court weeks, divided into twenty in Auckland, sixteen in Wellington, two or three weeks in Christchurch and one week in Dunedin.

The court maintains two courtrooms and judges' chambers in Auckland. These are located in the heritage premises of the High Court building on Waterloo Quadrant, constructed in 1865–68. Appeals being heard by the Divisional Court from the upper North Island are generally heard there, and appeals from the South Island are generally heard in Christchurch or Dunedin. Divisional Courts also sit in Wellington. Where urgency dictates, a divisional appeal originating from another part of the country will be heard in Wellington. On occasion the Permanent Court sits in Auckland, in cases of substantial local public interest.

=== Civil proceedings ===
The Court of Appeal (Civil) Rules 2005 set out the procedural requirements for pursuing civil appeals. The Court of Appeal has jurisdiction to hear and determine appeals from any judgment, decree or order of the High Court. Where the appeal to the Court of Appeal is itself an appeal from another court to the High Court, a further appeal to the Court of Appeal is available only if leave to appeal is given by the High Court or, where leave is refused by the High Court, by the Court of Appeal. Appeals on questions of law from the Employment Court can, with the leave of the Court of Appeal, be brought to the Court of Appeal.

=== Criminal proceedings ===
Any person convicted in the High Court or, on more serious charges, in the District Court may appeal to the Court of Appeal against the conviction, or the sentence passed on conviction, or both. The court has jurisdiction to hear appeals against pre-trial rulings in criminal cases. There is a right of appeal with respect to High Court decisions granting or refusing bail or in respect of conditions of bail.

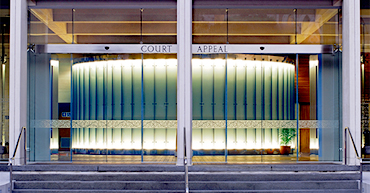
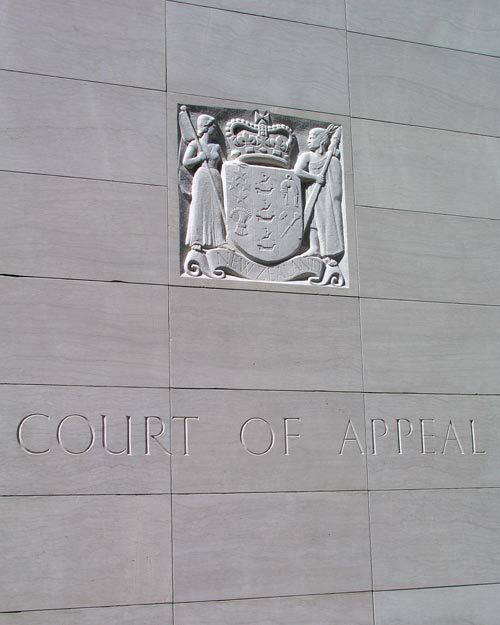
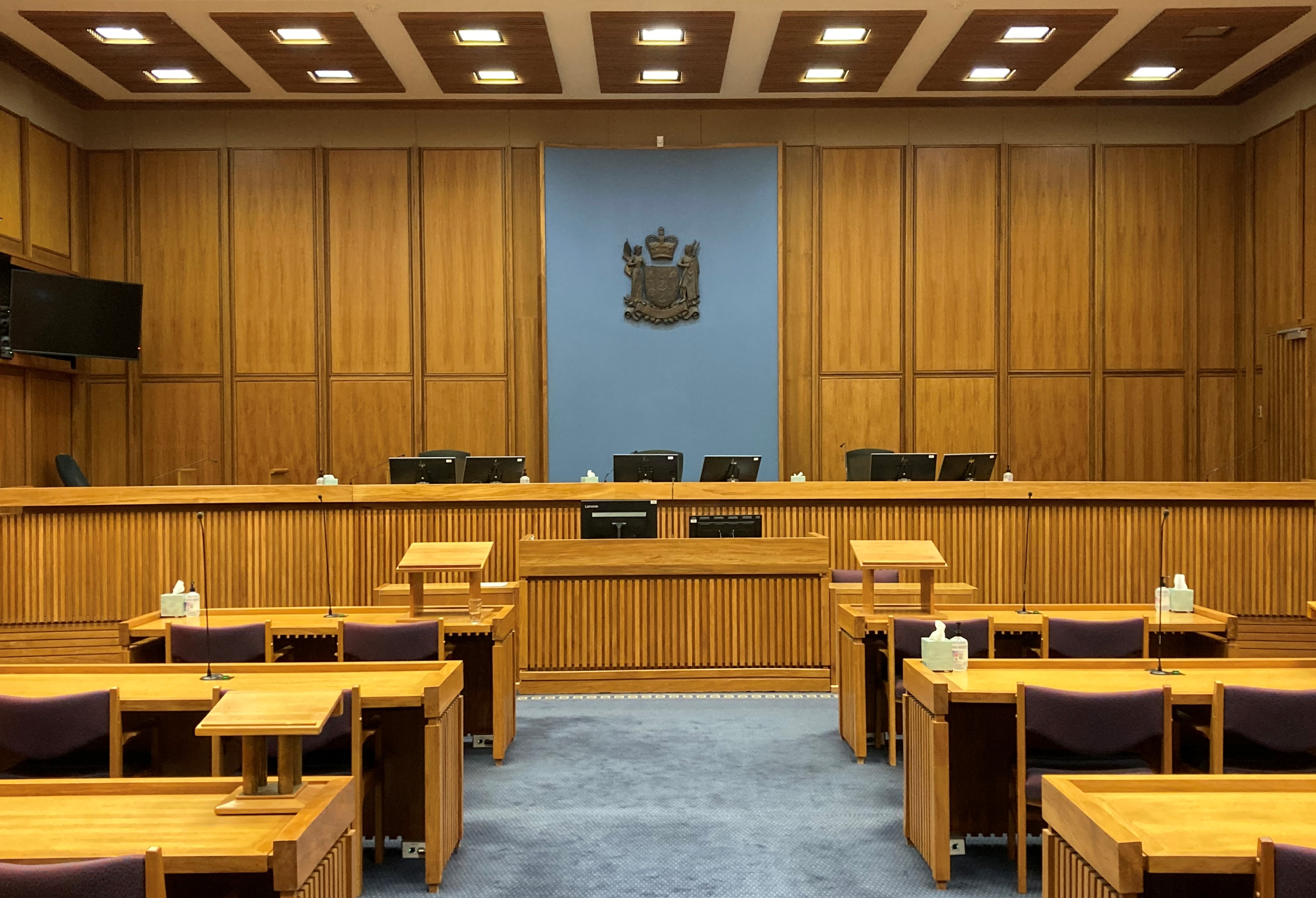
Court of Appeal in Wellington

The Court of Appeal (Criminal) Rules 2001 set out the procedural requirements for pursuing criminal appeals in the Court of Appeal. The Crimes Act 1961 and Criminal Procedure Act 2011 also contain both substantive and procedural provisions relevant to criminal appeals to the Court of Appeal.

An appeal or application for leave to appeal must be dealt with by way of a hearing involving oral submissions unless the judge or court making the decision on the mode of hearing determines that the appeal or application can be fairly dealt with on the papers.

Appellant in custody are not entitled to be present at a hearing involving oral submissions unless there is a legislative right to be present, or the Court of Appeal grants leave. Audio-visual links are often used by the court.

== Judges of the Court of Appeal ==
The current permanent judges of the Court of Appeal are:

Name	Appointed	Notes
Christine French	6 August 2012	President of the Court of Appeal from 21 November 2024
Patricia Courtney	14 February 2019	
Sarah Katz	26 April 2022	
Jillian Mallon	20 March 2023	
Susan Thomas	20 December 2023	
Rebecca Ellis	15 January 2024	
Matthew Palmer KC	1 June 2024	
Christian Whata	1 August 2025	
Rebecca Edwards	9 February 2026	
David Johnstone	16 July 2026	

In addition, David Collins KC holds a warrant as an Acting Judge of the Court of Appeal from 19 March 2026 until 18 March 2028, having previously been a permanent Judge to 18 March 2024 and then an acting Judge from 19 March 2024 to 18 March 2026.

The current registrar of the court is Maryanne McKennie.

== History of the Court of Appeal ==
The Court of Appeal has existed since 1862. Before the establishment of the Court of Appeal, appeals from High Court (then known as the Supreme Court) decisions were heard by the governor and members of the Executive Council of New Zealand. This was a temporary measure until there were sufficient judges to constitute a court of appeal.

By 1860, the High Court bench was large enough to sustain a court of appeal, but not large enough to provide a permanent court of appeal. From 1862 onwards, the Court of Appeal consisted of all judges of the Supreme Court who sat on the appellate court on a rotating basis. It initially sat in Christchurch and Dunedin, and then moved to Wellington when that city became capital in 1865. The increase in the court's workload and the practical difficulties of High Court judges making themselves available for appellate work and needing to prepare reserved judgments without conferences resulted in the call for a permanent court of appeal.

In 1957 a permanent, separate Court of Appeal was established, which began hearing cases in 1958. It was based in Wellington and initially had three dedicated Court of Appeal judges. There had been debate about whether the Chief Justice would head the separate Court of Appeal, but in the event the position of President of the Court of Appeal was created to head the Court. From 1957 until the end of 2003, the chief justice was an additional member of the Court of Appeal by virtue of their office. Chief Justices sat occasionally on the Court of Appeal but not regularly.

The number of permanent Court members has risen as the volume and complexity of litigation and appeals have increased. Between 1958 and 1977, the Court of Appeal had a bench of three permanent judges (in addition to the Chief Justice ex officio). This increased to four in 1977, five in 1979, six in 1986 and seven in 1987. Immediately prior to the creation of the Supreme Court, the Court comprised the President and six permanent members plus the Chief Justice. Today the court consists of the President and nine other judges.

== Former Presidents of the Court of Appeal ==
- Hon Sir Mark Cooper, KNZM KC, 26 April 2022 – 20 November 2024
- Hon Sir Stephen Kós, KNZM KC, 22 July 2016 – 21 April 2022
- Hon Dame Ellen France, DNZM, 1 September 2014 – 21 July 2016
- Hon Sir Mark O'Regan, KNZM, 1 July 2010 – 1 September 2014
- Hon Sir William Young, KNZM KC, 23 February 2006 – 1 July 2010
- Hon Sir Noel Anderson, KNZM QC, 1 January 2004 – 23 February 2006
- Rt Hon Sir Thomas Gault, KNZM QC, 24 May 2002 – 31 December 2003
- Rt Hon Sir Ivor Richardson, PCNZM QC, 17 February 1996 – 23 May 2002
- Rt Hon Sir Robin Cooke, ONZ KBE QC, 1 May 1986 – 16 February 1996
- Rt Hon Sir Owen Woodhouse, ONZ KBE DSC, 1 May 1981 – 1 May 1986
- Rt Hon Sir Clifford Richmond, KBE, 20 May 1976 – 30 April 1981
- Rt Hon Sir Thaddeus McCarthy, ONZ KBE, 1 July 1973 – 19 May 1976
- Rt Hon Sir Alexander Turner, KBE QC, 1 February 1972 – 29 June 1973
- Rt Hon Sir Alfred North, KBE QC, 22 July 1963 – 31 January 1972
- Rt Hon Sir Kenneth Gresson, KBE, 23 October 1957 – 17 July 1963

== Notable cases of the Court of Appeal ==
- R v AM [2010] NZCA 114, [2010] 2 NZLR 750 (31 March 2010)

Tariff judgment providing guidance for judges sentencing defendants for rape and unlawful sexual connection.

- R v Harpur [2010] NZCA 319, 24 CRNZ 909 (23 July 2010)

The defendant's conduct in meeting up with a woman with the intention of raping her 4-year old sister was sufficiently proximate conduct to be an attempted sexual violation despite the fact the 4-year old sister did not exist.

- Ridca Central v VM [2011] NZCA 659, [2012] 1 NZLR 641 (19 December 2011)

Judgment providing guidance for when orders requiring compulsory care of intellectually disabled persons detained under the Intellectual Disability (Compulsory Care and Rehabilitation) Act 2003 should be extended.

- Ministry of Health v Atkinson [2012] NZCA 184, [2012] 3 NZLR 456 (14 May 2012)

The Ministry of Health's policy of excluding family members from payment of disability services to their children was unjustified discrimination on the ground of family status.

- Hall v R [2015] NZCA 403 (2 September 2015)

Judgment providing guidance on the procedure to be adopted for appeals against conviction on the ground that the defendant's counsel at trial made errors in the conduct of the defence.

- R v Harrison [2016] NZCA 381 (10 August 2016)

Judgment providing interpretation of "manifestly unjust" in relation to the "three strikes" regime contained in the Sentencing and Parole Reform Act 2010.

- Attorney-General v Taylor [2017] NZCA 215 (26 May 2017)

Judgment providing guidance on the voting rights of prisoners.

== See also ==
- List of cases of the Court of Appeal of New Zealand
