= Emissions Trading Scheme Review Committee =

The Emissions Trading Scheme Review Committee was a special committee of the New Zealand Parliament which conducted a review of the Fifth Labour Government's Emissions Trading Scheme between December 2008 and late August 2009.

== Background ==
Immediately after the New Zealand general election, 2008, the new National-led government announced that, in accordance with its coalition agreement with the ACT Party, it would delay implementation of the New Zealand Emissions Trading Scheme ("NZ ETS") as established by the Labour Government in the Climate Change Response (Emissions Trading) Amendment Act 2008 and set up the Emissions Trading Scheme Review Committee to review the NZ ETS. In November 2008, the National Business Review reported that an international carbon trading company, EcoSecurities Group, had postponed opening an office in New Zealand because of the National Government's decision to delay the NZ ETS.

== Terms of reference ==
The National-ACT coalition agreement mentioned reviewing the emissions trading scheme and possible alternatives to it, as well as "hear[ing] competing views on the scientific aspects of climate change" and considering whether responding to climate change is economically worthwhile. New Zealand Herald journalist Brian Rudman commented that National's approach was "indulging Mr Hide in his fruitcake views on global warming".

However, the final terms of reference, released on 9 December 2008, were to: "identify the central/benchmark projections which are being used as the motivation for international agreements to combat climate change; and consider the uncertainties and risks surrounding those projections". The most economic-oriented term was to: "consider the impact on the New Zealand economy and New Zealand households of any climate change policies, having regard to the weak state of the economy, the need to safeguard New Zealand's international competitiveness, the position of trade-exposed industries, and the actions of competing countries".

== Report of the Select Committee ==
On 31 August 2009, the Emissions Trading Scheme Review Committee reported back to Parliament, with Climate Change Issues Minister Nick Smith stating that the National-led Government was still intending to amend the NZ ETS. The report consisted of minority reports from the New Zealand Labour Party, the Green Party, the Māori Party and the ACT Party. The chairman of the committee, Peter Dunne, described report as a 'middle road' through 'complex and contentious' material.

According to NZ Law firm Simpson Grierson, although the review report made 34 recommendations on climate change policy, it did not make any specific recommendations to amend either the NZ ETS or the Climate Change Response Act 2002. Simpson Grierson considered that the key findings of the review were that:

- the IPCC Fourth Assessment Report represents a consensus on scientific evidence, and should underpin New Zealand's policy.
- the ETS should be the primary economic mechanism to respond to climate change.
- the ETS should cover all sectors and all gases
- at the December 2009 Copenhagen Climate Conference New Zealand should seek an agreement that reflects New Zealand's willingness to do its fair share and play its part in setting the stage for further multilateral action for the post-2012 period.

Rod Oram described the recommendations made by the report as "obvious, indecisive or generic". Oram considered that the politics of the review were to provide a "sop to the ACT party and a time-waster for National". Oram concluded that the review had 'failed to make any serious contribution towards improving the working of the ETS'.

On 14 September 2009, the National Government announced that it had reached an agreement with the Māori Party about revisions to the NZ ETS. On 24 September 2009, the Climate Change Response (Moderated Emissions Trading) Amendment Bill had its first reading in Parliament.

== See also ==
- New Zealand Emissions Trading Scheme
- Climate change in New Zealand
- Energy in New Zealand
- List of climate change initiatives
