= King's Official Birthday =

Public holiday in Commonwealth realms

King's Birthday
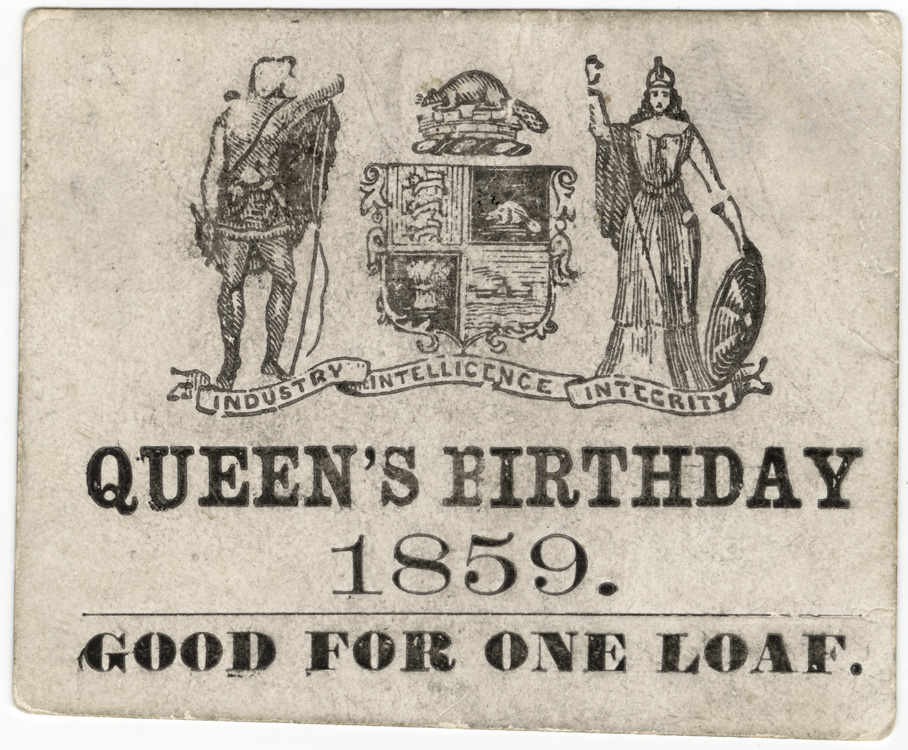
- A bread ticket from the 1859 Toronto celebrations entitling the bearer to a loaf of bread in celebration of the birthday of Queen Victoria
- Also called: King's Birthday, Victoria Day (in Canada)
- Observed by: Australia, Belize, Canada, Cook Islands, New Zealand, Papua New Guinea, Saint Kitts and Nevis, Solomon Islands, Tuvalu, United Kingdom
- Type: Varies by region
- Significance: Official celebration of the sovereign's birthday
- Date: Varies by region
- Frequency: Annual

The King's Official Birthday or Queen's Official Birthday is the selected day in most Commonwealth realms on which the birthday of the monarch is officially celebrated in those countries. It does not necessarily correspond to the date of the monarch's actual birth.

The sovereign's birthday was first officially marked in the Kingdom of Great Britain in 1748, for King George II. Since then, the date of the king or queen's birthday has been determined throughout the British Empire and, later, the Commonwealth of Nations, either by royal proclamations issued by the sovereign or viceroy, or by statute laws passed by the local parliament.

The date of the celebration today varies as adopted by each country and is generally set around the end of May or start of June, to coincide with a higher probability of fine weather in the Northern Hemisphere for outdoor ceremonies. In most cases, it is an official public holiday, sometimes aligning with the celebration of other events. Most Commonwealth realms release a Birthday Honours list at this time.

== Australia ==
Most Australian states and territories observe the King's Birthday on the second Monday in June, except in Western Australia and Queensland.

As Western Australia celebrates Western Australia Day (formerly known as Foundation Day) on the first Monday in June, the governor of Western Australia each year proclaims the day on which the state will observe the King's Birthday, based on school terms and the Perth Royal Show. There is no firm rule to determine this date, though it is usually the last Monday of September or the first Monday of October. Some regional areas of Western Australia celebrate the King's Birthday public holiday on alternative days for locally significant dates or events. In 2025, a bill was tabled in the Parliament of Western Australia that proposed shifting the date of the holiday to the second Monday in June in order to align with other states; the bill passed in October 2026, with the new date not coming into effect until 2028.

In 2012, Queensland celebrated the holiday in October, as the June holiday was reserved to mark Elizabeth II's Diamond Jubilee as Queen of Australia, after which the holiday then for three years reverted to its traditional date in line with the other eastern Australian states. However, starting in 2016, Queensland celebrates the holiday on the first Monday of October.

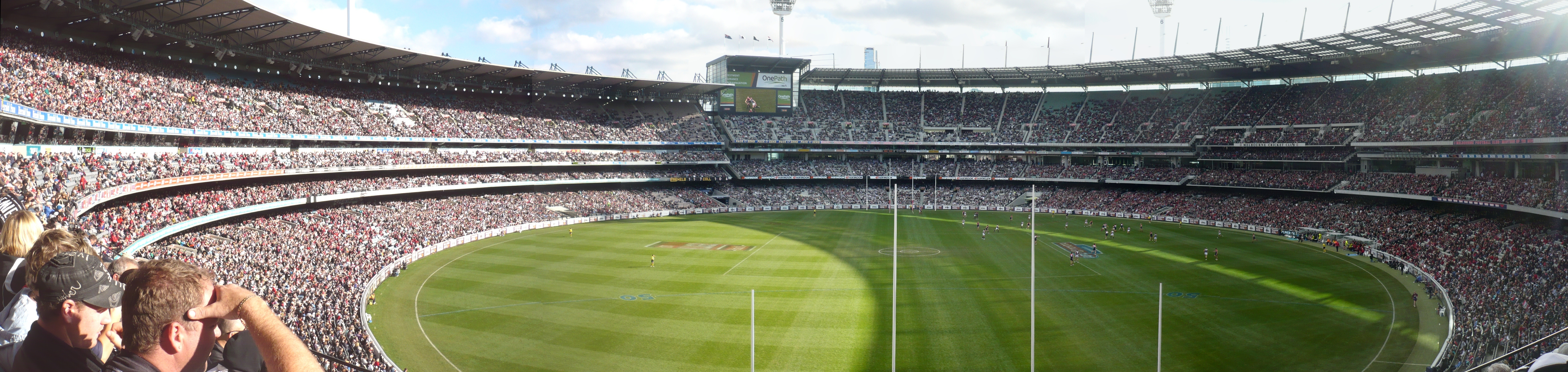
The King's Birthday match (pictured in 2011) is an Australian rules football game held annually on the King's Birthday holiday in Victoria.

Norfolk Island celebrates Bounty Day on 8 June, so King's Birthday is held on the Monday after the second Saturday in June. Christmas Island has other holidays and does not hold a King's Birthday holiday at all.

The day has been celebrated since 1788, when Governor Arthur Phillip declared a holiday to mark the birthday of the king of Great Britain. Until 1936, it was held on the actual birthday of the monarch, but, after King George V died, it was decided to keep the date on the second Monday in June. This has more evenly spaced out public holidays throughout the year. While George V's successor, Edward VIII, also celebrated his birthday in June, the three sovereigns since have not: George VI's birthday was in December, very close to public holidays for Christmas, Boxing Day, and New Years; Elizabeth II's birthday fell shortly after holidays for Good Friday and Easter and very close to ANZAC Day, while Charles III's birthday is in November, shortly after Remembrance Day.

The King's Birthday weekend and Empire Day (24 May) were the traditional times for public fireworks displays in Australia. The sale of fireworks to the public was banned in various states through the 1980s and by the Australian Capital Territory on 24 August 2009. Only Tasmania and the Northern Territory allow the sale of fireworks to the public. The King's Birthday Honours List, in which new members of the Order of Australia and other Australian honours are named, is released around the date of the King's Birthday weekend each June.

== Belize ==
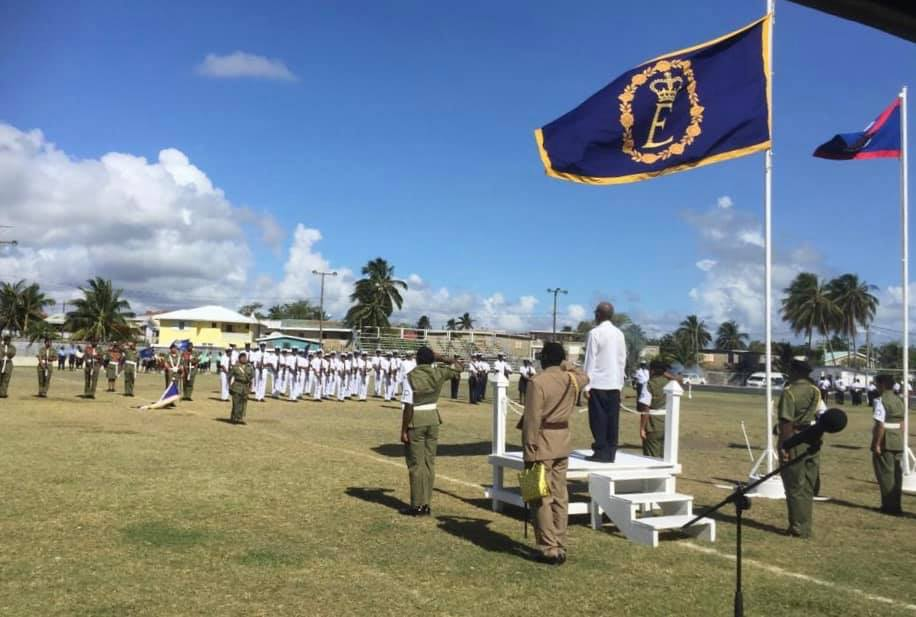
Queen Elizabeth II's personal flag flying at the Sovereign's Day parade in Belize City, 2019

Belize celebrates the birthday of the King annually in May. Known as Sovereign's Day, and is marked by parades in Belize City. Horse races, conducted by the National Sports Council, are held in Belize City's National Stadium and the People’s Stadium in Orange Walk Town. A cycling race, also arranged by the National Sports Council, is held between Belmopan and the district of Cayo. There is a flag-raising ceremony among other events held at schools and universities to commemorate Sovereign's Day.

== Canada ==
The monarch's birthday has been observed in Canada since the reign of King George III, when it, 4 June, was considered "the most important holiday of the year in early Upper Canada." The annual muster of the militia was held on the King's birthday, in the most central or most convenient place in each district, and every able-bodied man between the ages of 18 and 60, aside from Quakers, Mennonites, and other pacifist sects, was to take part. The drill ended with three cheers for the King before the participants were free to mingle about; they were known to engage in horseshoe pitching contests, wrestling matches, and settling old scores by fights before, in the summer night, the settlers and their families visited the houses of their neighbours or patronised the taverns; for the latter, it was their most profitable day all year. For the officers, a dinner was held, during which toasts were made to the King, the Duke of York (the Commander-in-Chief), the Army and Navy, and the ladies.

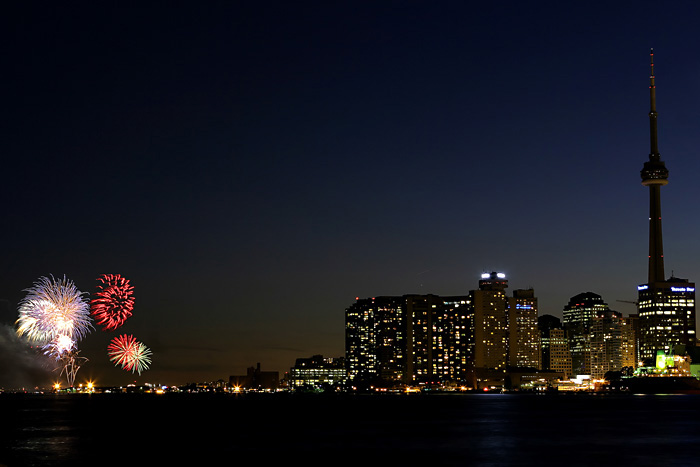
Fireworks during Victoria Day celebrations in Toronto

It was in 1845 that the Parliament of the Province of Canada passed a statute to authorise the recognition of Queen Victoria's birthday, 24 May, as a public holiday. After Victoria died in 1901, 24 May became Victoria Day and the official date in Canada of the reigning monarch's birthday changed through various royal proclamations: for Edward VII, it continued by yearly proclamation to be observed on 24 May, but, was 3 June for George V and 23 June for Edward VIII (their actual birthdays).

Edward VIII abdicated on 11 December 1936, three days before the birthday of his brother and successor, George VI. The new King expressed to his ministers his wish that his birthday not be publicly celebrated, in light of the recent circumstances. However, the Prime Minister at the time, William Lyon Mackenzie King, the rest of Cabinet, and the Lord Tweedsmuir, the Governor General, felt otherwise, seeing such a celebration as a way to begin George's reign on a positive note. George VI's official birthday in Canada was thereafter marked on various days between 20 May and 14 June.

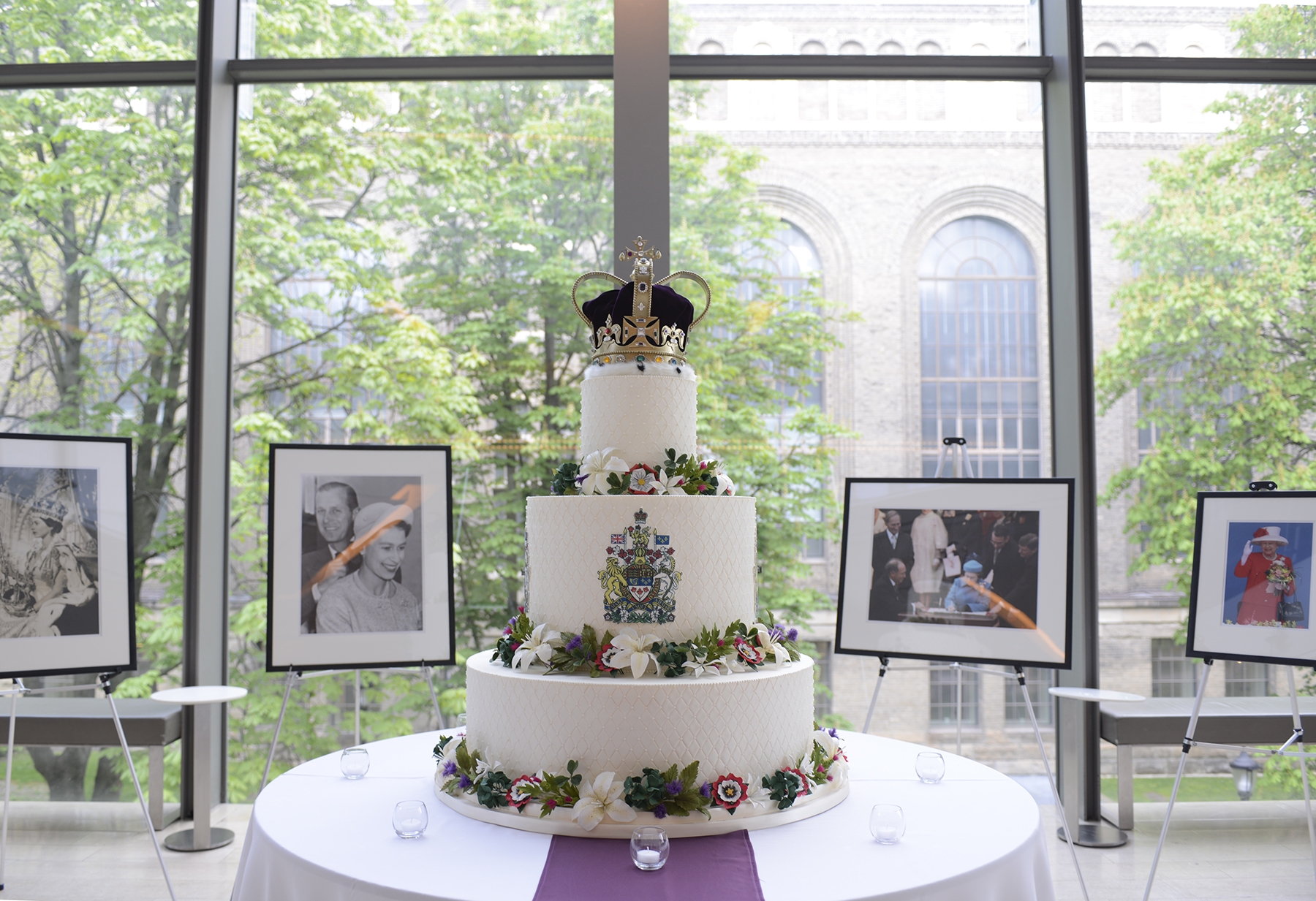
A birthday cake at a gala for Queen Elizabeth II's 90th birthday in May 2016

The first official birthday of Elizabeth II, daughter of George VI, was the last to be celebrated in June; the haphazard format was abandoned in 1952, when the Governor General-in-Council moved Empire Day and an amendment to the law moved Victoria Day both to the Monday before 25 May. The Canadian monarch's official birthday in Canada was, by regular viceregal proclamations, made to fall on this same date every year between 1953 and 1957, when a royal proclamation issued on 5 February established the Queen's official birthday as the last Monday before 25 May, making the link between Victoria Day and the sovereign's official birthday permanent, though not expressed explicitly.

Though the holiday was called Sovereign's Birthday, the 1957 proclamation itself designated the day as "the Queen's birthday". As such, in May 2023, following the accession of Charles III as King of Canada, a new proclamation declared "the celebration in Canada of the birthday of the sovereign to be Victoria Day", thus applying the official birthday to all future monarchs, regardless of gender, and, by replacing the Monday before 25 May with Victoria Day, making the connection with Victoria Day explicit.

Nonetheless, the two holidays are entirely distinct in law (Victoria Day fixed by statute and the Sovereign's Birthday determined by proclamation depending on the Interpretation Act, which requires the Sovereign's Birthday to be observed either on the day itself or on a day proclaimed for its observance) except for being appointed to be observed on the same day; it is a general holiday in Nunavut and New Brunswick (there prescribed as a day of rest on which retail businesses must be closed). Though the media mention only Victoria Day and the public are therefore almost totally unaware of the existence of the official birthday, the sovereign's official birthday is marked by the firing of an artillery salute in the national and provincial capitals and the flying of the Royal Union Flag on buildings belonging to the federal Crown, if there is a second flag pole available.

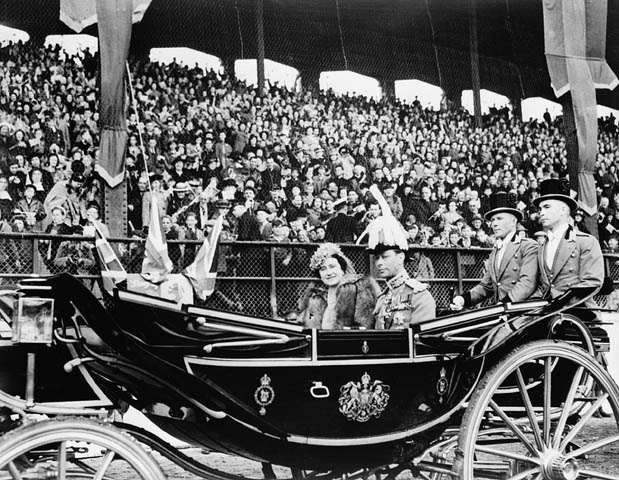
King George VI attending official birthday celebrations in Ottawa during his 1939 royal tour of Canada

The Canadian monarch has been in Canada for his or her official birthday twice: The first time was 20 May 1939, when King George VI was on a coast-to-coast tour of Canada and his official birthday was celebrated with a Trooping the Colour ceremony on Parliament Hill. The second time was when Queen Elizabeth II was in Canada from 17 to 25 May 2005, to mark the centennial of the entries of Saskatchewan and Alberta into Confederation; no government-initiated events, aside from those dictated by normal protocol, were organised to acknowledge the official birthday. Charles III, who was Prince of Wales and heir apparent to the throne at the time, and his wife, Camilla, in 2012 attended events in Saint John, New Brunswick, and Toronto, Ontario, marking the Queen's official birthday. In 2014, the couple attended a ceremony in Charlottetown, Prince Edward Island.

== New Zealand ==
Until 1936, New Zealand celebrated the actual birthday of the sovereign. After Edward VIII abdicated on 11 December 1936, and George VI was proclaimed king on his birthday, 14 December, two King's Birthday holidays were celebrated that year. The second holiday that year caused some industrial confusion and loss. This led the government to introduce the Sovereign's Birthday Observance Act 1937. It set the official birthday to be the first Monday in June (which it has been to this day), and this was first observed in 1937. The legislation was changed after Elizabeth II became Queen through the Sovereign's Birthday Observance Act 1952. Although that act makes reference to "Her Majesty Queen Elizabeth the Second", it was still in place in 2023, the first time that New Zealand observed the King's Birthday for Charles III. The Holidays Act 2003 refers to the holiday as "the birthday of the reigning Sovereign".

King's Birthday celebrations are mainly official, including the King's Birthday Honours list and military ceremonies. There were proposals, with some political support, mainly affiliated with Labour, to replace the holiday with Matariki (Māori New Year) as an official holiday. In 2022, the Te Kāhui o Matariki Public Holiday Act declared Matariki as an official holiday separate from the Queen's Birthday, making said proposals obsolete. The idea of renaming the Queen's Birthday weekend to Hillary weekend, after mountaineer Sir Edmund Hillary, was raised in 2009.

== Papua New Guinea ==
The King's Official Birthday is a public holiday in Papua New Guinea. In Papua New Guinea, it is usually celebrated on 17 June every year. Official celebrations occur at hotels in Port Moresby, and much of the day is filled with sports matches, fireworks displays, and other celebrations and events. Honours and medals are given for public service to Papua New Guineans, who are mentioned in the King's Birthday Honours List.

== Solomon Islands ==
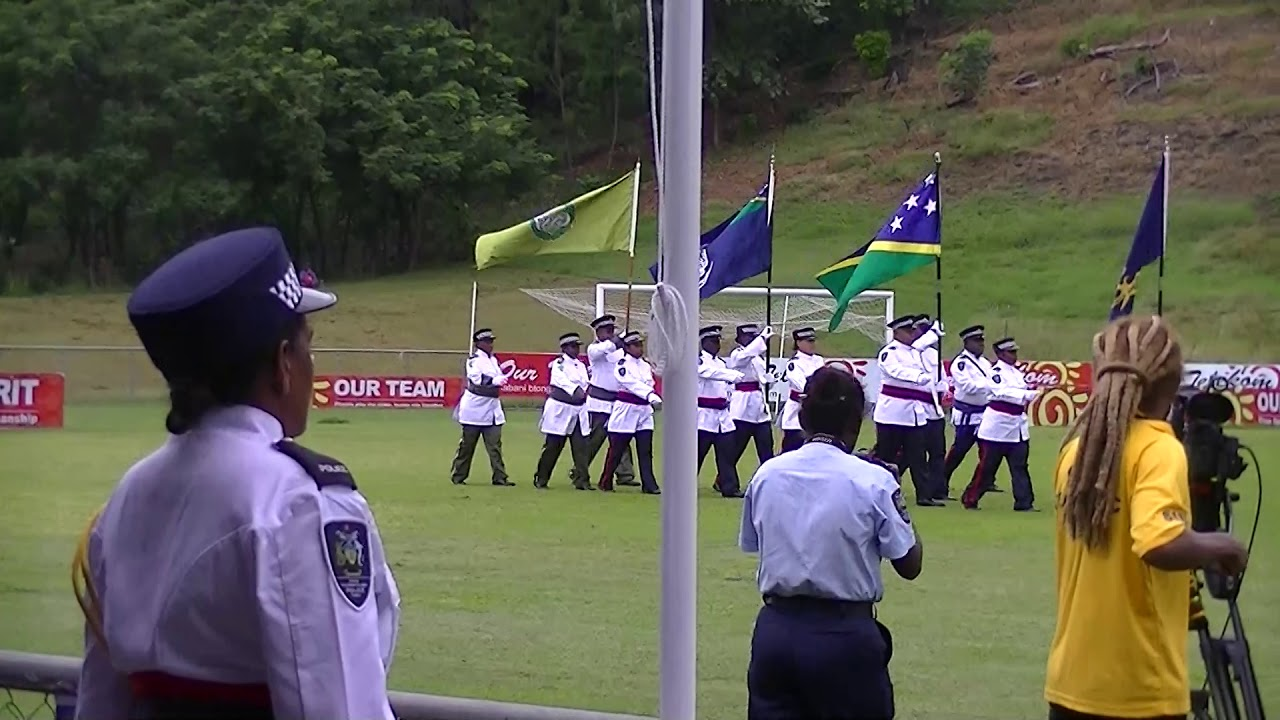
The Queen's Birthday Parade in the Solomon Islands, 2019

The King's Official Birthday is a public holiday in Solomon Islands. In Solomon Islands, it is usually celebrated on the second Friday of June every year. It is regarded as one of the most important events of the year in Solomon Islands. The day starts with the police marching band performing in the capital city of Honiara. Rallies are held all over the islands, which is followed by sporting events and custom dancing, and the celebrations and parties go long into the night.

The governor-general of Solomon Islands delivers a speech on the King's Birthday, and honours and medals are given to those who have done valiant things and great service for Solomon Islands and its people.

== Tuvalu ==
The King's Official Birthday is a public holiday in Tuvalu, usually celebrated on the second Saturday of June every year. Tuvaluans celebrate it with church services and prayers, singing "God Save the King" and "Tuvalu mo te Atua", flag hoisting, public speeches, a Royal Salute, and a parade. As the King's Birthday is a public holiday, all government offices, educational institutions, and most businesses are closed for the day.

As of 2021, Tuvaluans also celebrated the birthday of Charles, Prince of Wales, who at the time was heir to the Tuvaluan Throne. Heir to the Throne Day was a public holiday in November.

== United Kingdom ==
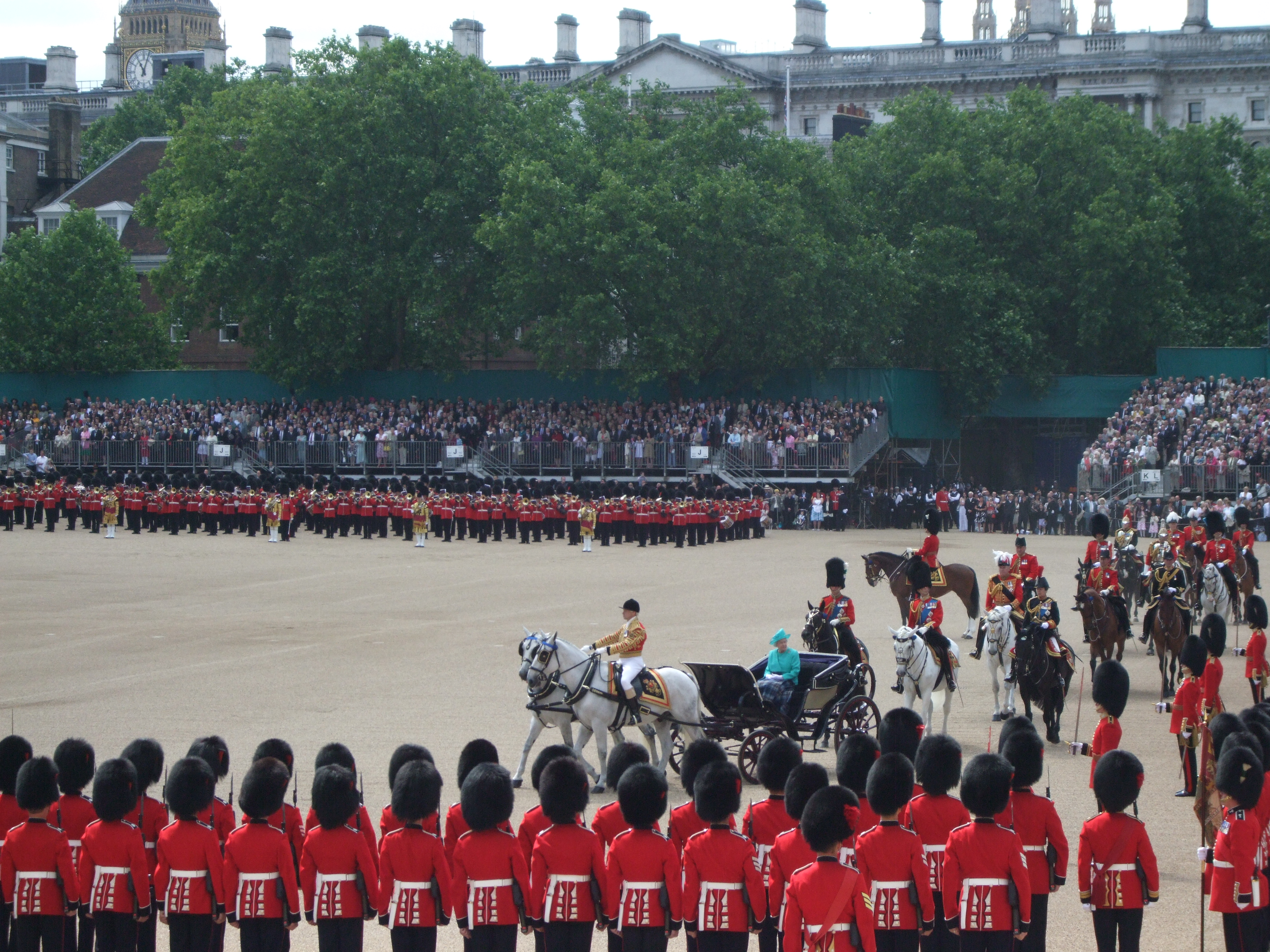
Queen Elizabeth II at the Trooping the Colour on her Official Birthday in 2008

The monarch's birthday has been celebrated in the United Kingdom since 1748, during the reign of King George II. Even when their real birthday was on a different date, the celebration was often in May or June. Edward VII, who reigned from 1901 to 1910 and whose birthday was on 9 November, moved his official birthday to summer, in the hope of good weather. King George VI, born on 14 December, celebrated his official birthday from 7 to 12 June. The late Queen Elizabeth II's official birthday was (usually) the second Saturday in June. King Charles III's first official birthday was on 17 June 2023, the third Saturday in June; and his second on 15 June 2024, also the third Saturday in June. In 2025, Charles’ official birthday fell for the first time on the second Saturday of June, the 14th, and again on the 13th of June in 2026.

The day is marked in London by the ceremony of Trooping the Colour, which is also known as the King's Birthday Parade. The list of Birthday Honours is also announced at the time of the Official Birthday celebrations. In British diplomatic missions, the day is treated as the national day of the United Kingdom. Although it is not celebrated as a specific public holiday in the UK, some civil servants are given a "privilege day" at this time of year, which is sometimes merged with the Spring bank holiday (last Monday in May) to create a four-day weekend. The King's birthday is the last remaining privilege day, the other 1.5 days having been abolished in 2014 and replaced by a 1.5 day increase in civil servants' annual leave.

=== British Overseas Territories and Crown Dependencies ===
The King's official birthday is a public holiday in most British Overseas Territories (those parts of Britain's sovereign territory that lie outside the archipelago of the British Isles), including Anguilla, the Cayman Islands, Gibraltar, Montserrat, Saint Helena, Ascension and Tristan da Cunha and the Turks and Caicos Islands, and the Crown Dependencies (which are not parts of Britain's sovereign territory, but are dependencies of the British Crown), including Guernsey and Jersey in the Channel Islands, and the Isle of Man. Bermuda formerly marked the occasion with a public holiday but in 2008 the Progressive Labour Party government of the territory decided the day would be, beginning the following year, replaced by National Heroes' Day, despite protests from some residents of the island, who signed a petition calling for retention of The Queen's Official Birthday. The Queen's Official Birthday continues, nonetheless, to be marked by a public parade on Front Street in the City of Hamilton (with the first King's Birthday Parade since the death of King George VI held on 15 June, 2024), and by a Queen's Birthday Party at Government House. The Falkland Islands celebrate the actual day of King Charles III's birth, 14 November, as a public holiday. (November is a spring month in the southern hemisphere where the islands are located).

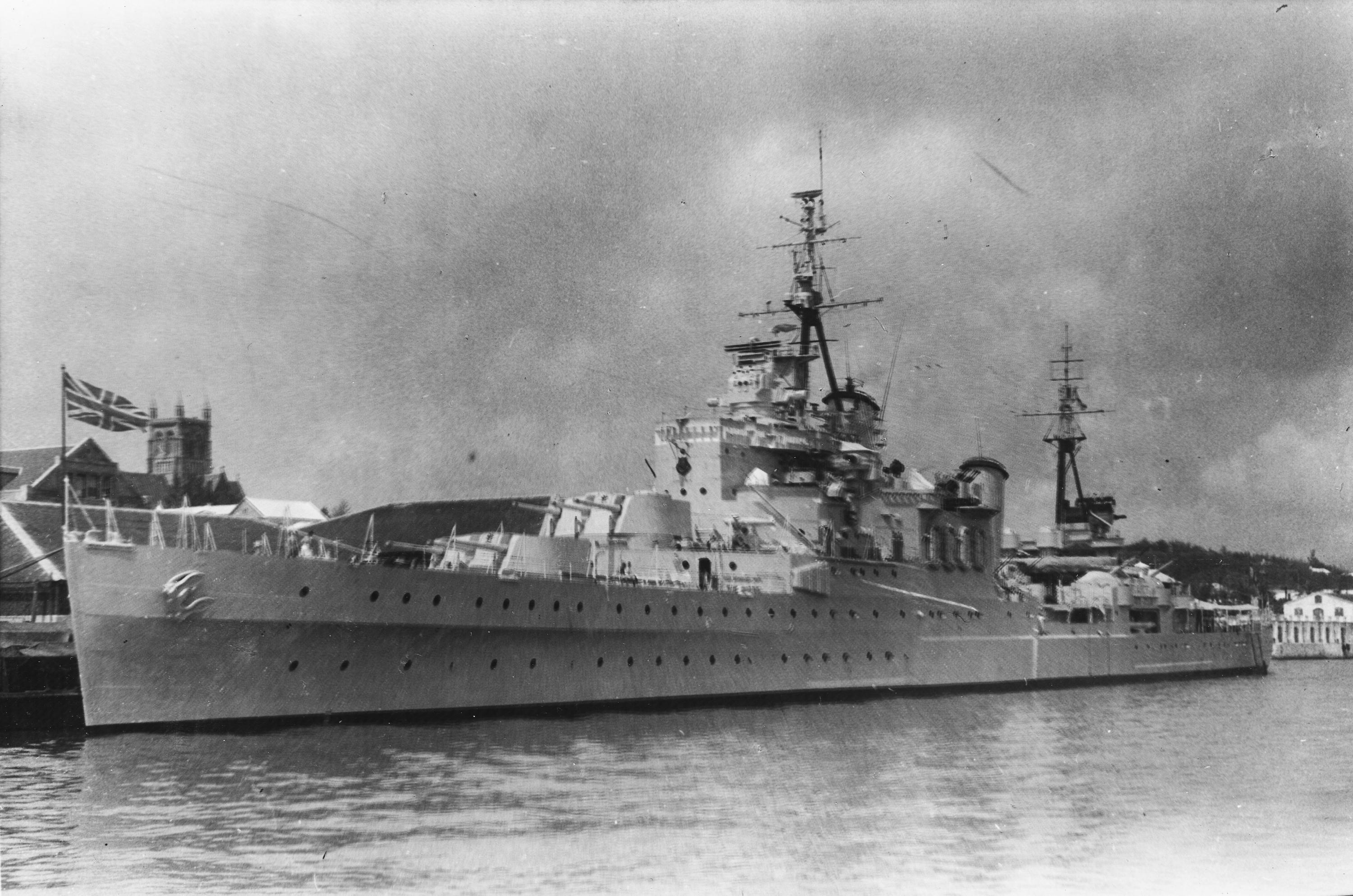
HMS Sheffield at City of Hamilton, Bermuda, for 10 June, 1948, King's Birthday ceremony.

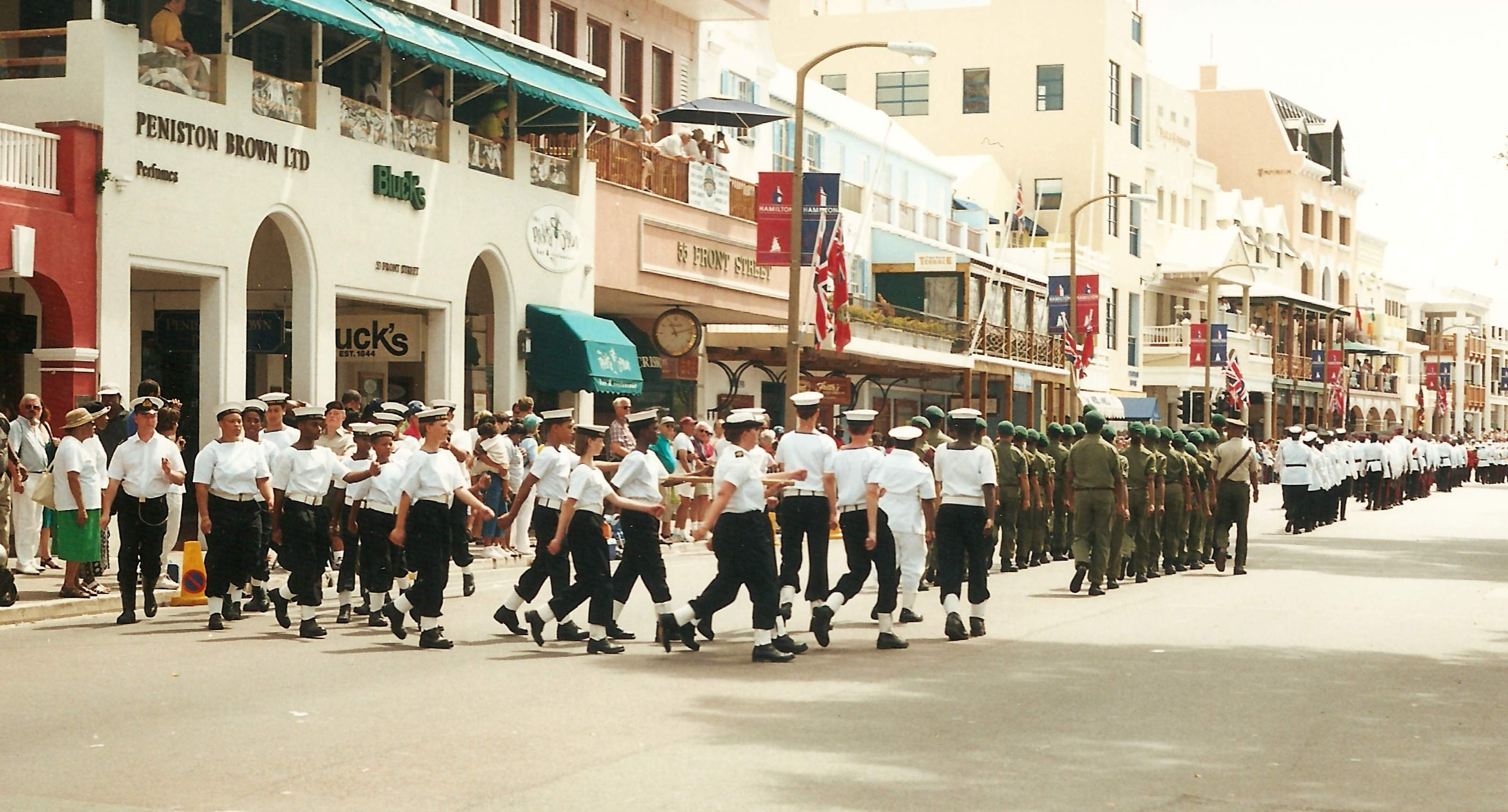
Queen's Birthday Parade, in the City of Hamilton, Bermuda, in 2000

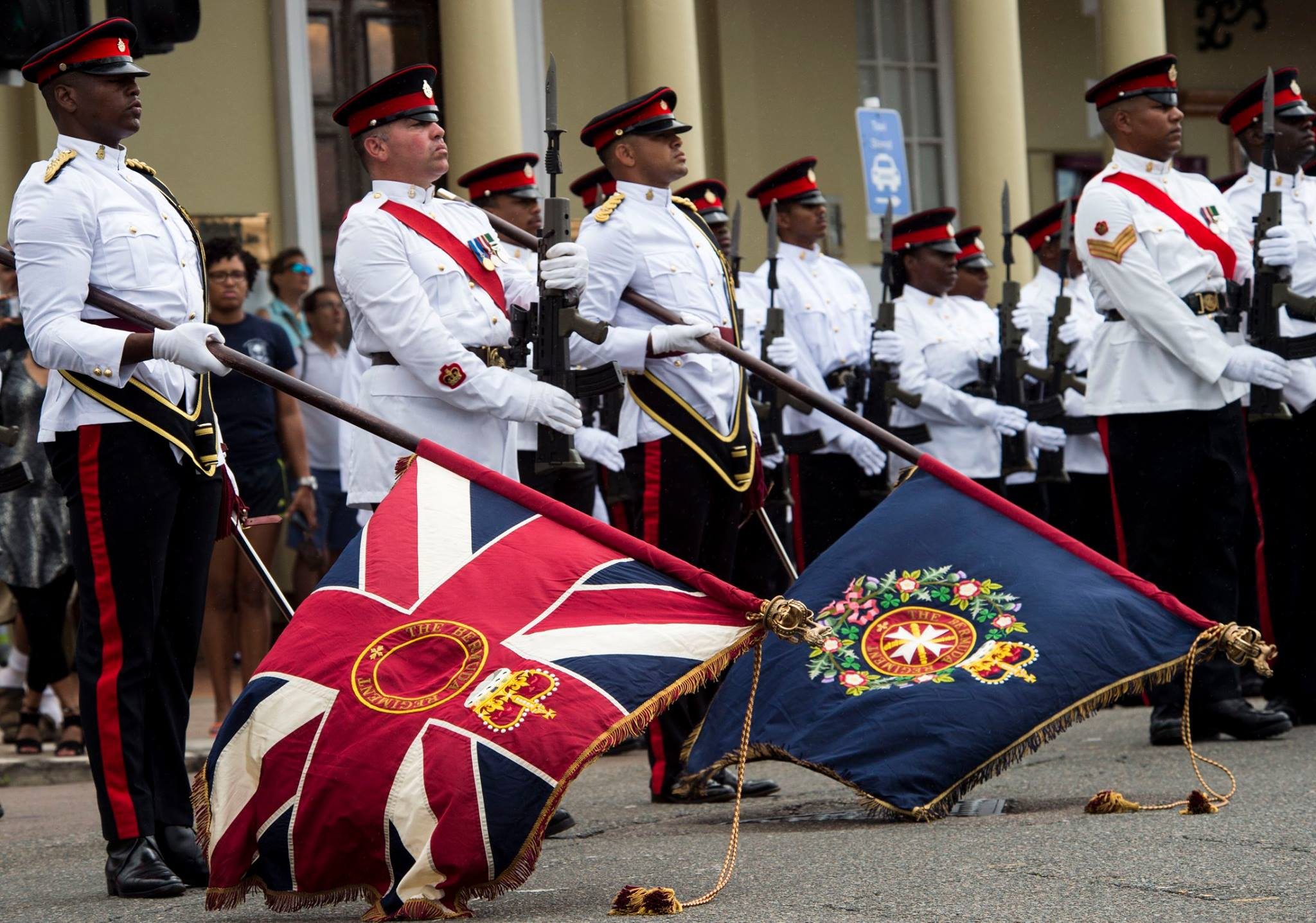
Colour party of the Royal Bermuda Regiment at Queen's Birthday Parade in the City of Hamilton, Bermuda, on 10 June 2017

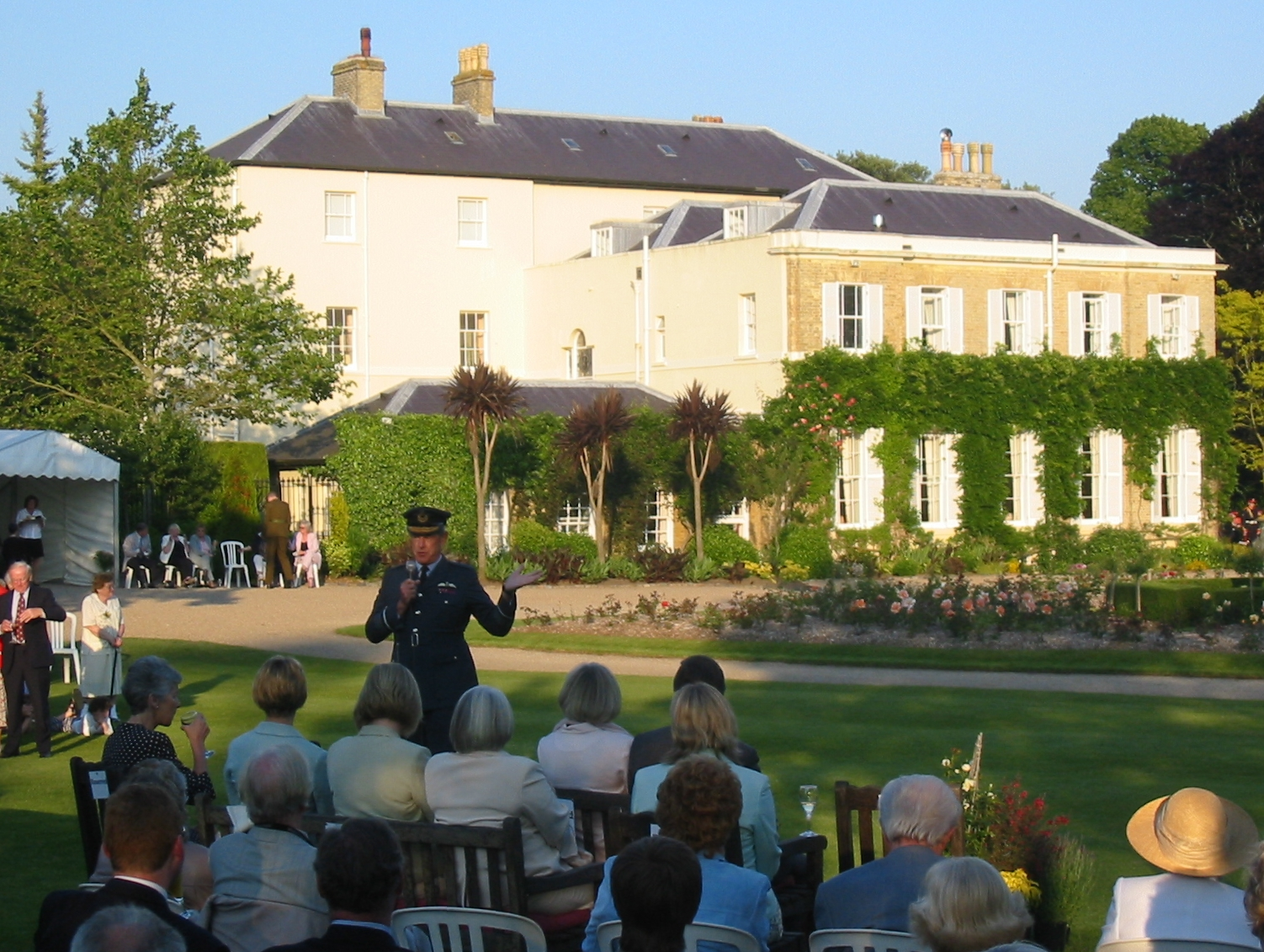
A reception for the public hosted by Jersey's Lieutenant Governor at Government House in 2005 to mark the Queen's Official Birthday and to name recipients of Birthday Honours

== Other Commonwealth countries ==
In Saint Kitts and Nevis, the date of the King's Official Birthday is set each year. The Cook Islands, a self-governing country in free association with New Zealand, also celebrates the holiday on the second Monday of June.

Despite Fiji abolishing the monarchy in 1987, following a second military coup d'état, the Queen's Birthday continued to be celebrated each 12 June until 2012. That year, the military government of Commodore Frank Bainimarama announced the holiday would be abolished, despite Bainimarama being a monarchist himself.

== See also ==
- Constitution Day (many nations)
- Day of the Sun (North Korea)
- Grand Duke's Official Birthday (Luxembourg)
- King's Feast (Belgium)
- Koningsdag (the Netherlands)
- National Day of Sweden (Sweden)
- Renaissance Day (Oman)
- The Emperor's Birthday (Japan)
- Birthday of the Yang di-Pertuan Agong (Malaysia)
- Washington's Birthday (United States)
- Youth Day (Morocco)
