= New Zealand Emissions Trading Scheme =

NZ's market-based approach to reduce CO2

New Zealand Unit Prices

The New Zealand Emissions Trading Scheme (NZ ETS) is an all-gases partial-coverage uncapped domestic emissions trading scheme for emissions of greenhouse gases. It features price floors, forestry offsetting, free allocation and auctioning of emissions units.

The NZ ETS was first legislated in the Climate Change Response (Emissions Trading) Amendment Act 2008 in September 2008 under the Fifth Labour Government of New Zealand and then amended in November 2009 and in November 2012 by the Fifth National Government of New Zealand.

The NZ ETS was until 2015 highly linked to international carbon markets as it allowed unlimited importing of most of the Kyoto Protocol emission units. There is a domestic emission unit; the 'New Zealand Unit' (NZU), which was initially issued by free allocation to emitters until auctions of units commenced in 2020. The NZU is equivalent to 1 tonne of carbon dioxide. Free allocation of units varies between sectors. The commercial fishery sector (who are not participants) received a one-off free allocation of units on a historic basis. Owners of pre-1990 forests received a fixed free allocation of units. Free allocation to emissions-intensive industry, is provided on an output-intensity basis. For this sector, there is no set limit on the number of units that may be allocated. The number of units allocated to eligible emitters is based on the average emissions per unit of output within a defined 'activity'. Bertram and Terry (2010, p 16) state that as the NZ ETS does not 'cap' emissions, the NZ ETS is not a cap and trade scheme as understood in the economics literature.

Some stakeholders have criticised the New Zealand Emissions Trading Scheme for its generous free allocations of emission units and the lack of a carbon price signal (the Parliamentary Commissioner for the Environment), and for being ineffective in reducing emissions (Greenpeace Aotearoa New Zealand).

The NZ ETS has been reviewed and amended many times: first in November 2009 then in late 2011 to 2012 by an independent panel. A 2016 Government review concluded that the NZ ETS had caused only minimal reductions in net emissions. In 2020 rules for emissions budgets and auctions of units within price caps were introduced.

== Economics ==
=== Economic modelling ===
In June 2009, Nick Smith released an economic modelling report on the NZ ETS by economic consultants NZIER and Infometrics which had been prepared for the Emissions Trading Scheme Review Committee. Smith stated that the report supported the Government's intention to modify the NZ ETS. The report "Economic modelling of New Zealand climate change policy" created static computable general equilibrium (CGE) models using 2008 emissions projections. The terms of reference set the policy options to look at as the 2008 NZETS vs the least-cost option for meeting the Kyoto liability vs a revenue-neutral tax on carbon equivalents.

The impacts of the various options were estimated as the differences between a carbon tax and a reference 'business as usual' scenario assuming New Zealand had not signed the Kyoto Protocol. The variables changed in the model runs were the NZ carbon price ($0, $10, $25 or $100), the world carbon price, the duration (short term to 2012, long term to 2025), the level of free allocation and whether the Government assumed all Kyoto liabilities. The results of each model run was reported as the percent difference from the 'no-Kyoto' 'business as usual' scenario in 2012 or 2025.

The report noted several limitations of computable general equilibrium models that should be kept in mind in interpreting the results: CGE models are only an approximation of highly complex real economies, results can only ever be indicative, and are highly dependent on the structure of the models and the input assumptions and on the assumption that other variables remain constant. Therefore, the "interpretation of CGE results should centre on their direction (up or down) and broad magnitude (small, medium or large), rather than on the precise point estimates that the model produces".

The report's bolded conclusion was that a narrow carbon tax or trading scheme was the least cost option in the short term. Predicted reductions in GHG emissions ranged from 0% (Government pays), 0.4% to 2.8% for a $25 carbon price and 3% to 4% for a $50 price. However, the report noted that there was little difference in costs between the government paying all and the ETS with free allocation, as all the model results indicated small reductions (-0.1% and -0.4%) in Gross National Disposable Income compared to 'business as usual'. In respect of the 2009 amendments to the NZ ETS, intensity-based allocation was favoured over allocations based on historical emissions by business groups, and representatives of large emitters, by Fonterra and by Federated Farmers. Environmental organisations and opposition political parties opposed intensity based allocations.

== First version of the emissions trading scheme, 2008 ==
=== Background ===
In 2002, the Fifth Labour Government of New Zealand adopted the Climate Change Response Act 2002 in order for New Zealand to ratify the Kyoto Protocol and to meet obligations under the United Nations Framework Convention on Climate Change.

=== Labour's emissions trading scheme ===
In 2008, the Labour Government enacted the Climate Change Response (Emissions Trading) Amendment Act 2008 which added the first version of the New Zealand Emissions Trading Scheme to the Climate Change Response Act 2002.

The proposed scheme covered all six greenhouse gases specified in the Kyoto Protocol and was intended to progressively apply to all sectors of the economy including agriculture. 'Participants' (who would account for their emissions) were to be few, and high in the production chain of each sector. Their compliance obligation would have been to surrender one New Zealand unit (NZU) or one internationally tradable Kyoto-compliant unit for each tonne of emissions.

New Zealand units were to be capped in number and were to be allocated to participants either by grandparenting (gifting) or auctioning. Sectors of the economy were to have progressively entered the NZ ETS, with forestry the first from January 2008 and agriculture last in January 2013. Allocation rules varied between sectors. In general, participants who could pass on costs of the ETS, such as fuel companies, would not be allocated free units. Participants such as exporters with products that are priced internationally, would be allocated free units.

Forest owners with pre-1990 forests were to receive a fixed one-off free allocation of units. Transport (liquid fossil fuels), stationary energy and industrial processes would not receive a free allocation of units. Trade-exposed industries would have received a free allocation of 90% of 2005 emissions annually to 2018. From 2019 to 2029 the free allocation of units would have phased out at the rate of a 1/12 (8.3%) reduction each year. Agriculture would have received a free allocation of 90% of 2005 emissions each year to 2018. From 2019 to 2029 the free allocation would have phased out at the rate of a 1/12 (8.3%) reduction each year. Fishing would have received a free allocation based on 50% of 2005 emissions each year from July 2010 to January 2013.

The Labour Government subsequently lost the 2008 New Zealand election to the coalition led by National Party, who had campaigned on amending the NZ ETS.

== The amendments of 2009 ==
=== History ===
In December 2008, the National-led Government set up the Emissions Trading Scheme Review Committee to review the NZ ETS. The committee provided a report nine months later on 31 August 2009.

In early September 2009, Rod Oram predicted that the National Government's goals would be; to adopt intensity-based allocation of free carbon credits to export industries; have no cap on greenhouse gas emissions; to have a temporary cap on the price of carbon; to delay bringing in sectors into the NZETS; to delay phasing out free emission units; and, maximum alignment with the Australian Carbon Pollution Reduction Scheme. Oram viewed these changes as significantly weakening the incentives to reduce emissions and to plant carbon forests.

On 14 September 2009, the National Government Minister for Climate Change Issues Nick Smith announced that it had reached an agreement with the Māori Party about revisions to the NZ ETS and that an amending bill would be drafted in order to "make the ETS workable and affordable".

On 24 September 2009, the Climate Change Response (Moderated Emissions Trading) Amendment Bill had its first reading in Parliament and was sent to the Finance and Expenditure Select Committee for public submissions.

=== Submissions to the Finance and Expenditure Committee ===
Between 15 October 2009 and the date of its final report, 16 November 2009, the Finance and Expenditure Committee received 399 submissions on National's draft bill.

=== Absence of a cap on emissions ===
In 2007, the Ministry for the Environment released a detailed report, "The Framework for a New Zealand Emissions Trading Scheme", which stated the NZ ETS would not have a binding, absolute limit on the total level of emissions allowed in New Zealand. While the quantity of domestic NZ Units gifted to eligible emitters would be fixed, the quantity of international 'Kyoto-compliant' units that could be imported in to match emissions would not be limited. In consequence, as there is no limit on the volume of international emissions units (CERs and ERUs) that may be imported, there is no cap or limit on the volume of emissions permitted in New Zealand provided that emissions units are imported into the country and surrendered. In that respect, the NZ ETS is unlike most other emissions trading schemes,

Ministry for the Environment Fact Sheet 16 stated "There is no cap on the emissions that occur within New Zealand." However, the Ministry for the Environment still regarded the NZ ETS as operating within the cap on emissions established by the Kyoto Protocol for the first commitment period of 2008–2012. Moyes (2008) describes this as a "flexible cap" where New Zealand sourced emissions regulated by the NZETS are constrained only by the international market price for GHG emissions.

Minister for Climate Change Dr Nick Smith's press release of September 2009 announced that the method of allocation of NZ units to trade exposed and emissions intensive firms would now be based on average industry production, where the levels of units allocated would vary in proportion to a firm's production.

In combination with the unlimited use of internationally sourced Kyoto units, the allocation of New Zealand units to eligible emitters in proportion to their production means that there is no cap on total emissions within New Zealand.

There is also no cap on total emissions during the transition period as the Government will supply the market with unlimited New Zealand units at the fixed price of NZ$25 per NZU.

When the NZETS included a proposed free allocation of units to agriculture, there were no eligibility tests. Allocations to agricultural activities were to have been made on an intensity basis. The baseline would have been the sector average emissions per unit of output.

=== Allocation of NZ Units to trade-exposed activities ===
Under the 2009 NZ ETS, all NZ emission units were only distributed into the market by free allocation (gifting). In 2010, the Ministry for the Environment stated that there was no intention in the short term to auction any emission units. 'Emissions-intensive' and 'trade-exposed' (EITE) activities are designated a benchmark level of emissions per unit of production. For example, x amount of carbon dioxide equivalent emissions per tonne of steel. Firms then receive an allocations based on their expected production of the emissions intensive good.

This method of allocation is often referred to as 'intensity based allocation'. Intensity based allocations are allocations that are based on the volume of production of a firm. Allocations are given at the beginning of the period and then balanced at the conclusion to reflect actual output.

The benchmark (or allocative baseline) for free allocation for firms considered emissions-intensive and trade-exposed includes compensation for electricity price increases.

=== Fiscal impact of allocation ===
From the 2008 election, the policy of the National Party was that the NZ ETS should be fiscally neutral, in the sense of a Government policy where any new taxes or revenues equal any new spending The policy of a fiscally neutral NZ ETS was confirmed by John Key Bill English, and Nick Smith in his speech on the third reading of the Climate Change Response (Moderated Emissions Trading) Amendment Act 2009.

The cost of free allocation of units to emitters is a highly contentious subject. The Sustainability Council argued that the allocation of units to industry is highly costly to taxpayers.

Dr Christina Hood, a climate change and energy policy consultant, submitted to the Finance and Expenditure Select Committee that the use of uncapped intensity based allocation of units will result in a taxpayer subsidy to emitters of about NZ$105 billion up to 2050.

Economist Geoff Bertram estimated that at a carbon price of NZ$50 a tonne, the cost to taxpayers of the free allocation of NZ units to emitters will be NZ$99 billion between 2010 and 2091.

Nick Smith's Cabinet Paper noted that the New Zealand Treasury had estimated that the long-term costs of intensity-based allocation of units to industry and agriculture would be 'very significant', in the order of NZ$900 million per annum by 2030.

The Clerk of the House invited economist Suzi Kerr to give independent specialist advice on the Climate Change Response (Moderated Emissions Trading) Amendment Bill. Kerr's advice was that the free allocation of emission units significantly raised the overall cost of the NZ ETS to the economy and transferred it to taxpayers.

=== Decrease in allocation of units ===
The 2009 legislation did not include a specific sunset clause to change the allocation of units to firms that undertake emissions-intensive and trade-exposed activities. The legislation stipulates that allocations must be reviewed no less than once every five years by a review panel. In late 2009, Climate Change Minister Nick Smith stated that estimates of fiscal impacts beyond 2020 at the present time are meaningless as there are simply too many unknowns.

Although the level of allocation per unit of output for emissions-intensive and trade-exposed industrial activities decreases at 1.3% per year from 2013, as production may increase, allocations may also increase over time.

=== Transitional assistance ===
The NZ ETS contains special transitional provisions from 1 July 2010 (when fossil emissions enter the scheme) until 31 December 2012 (transition period). This end date coincides with the end date of the Kyoto Protocol. Although transitional measures are legislated to end after 2012, the Government has suggested that they will be extended in the event that major trading partners such as the US and Australia do not implement emissions trading schemes of their own before then.

During the transition period participants in energy, fossil fuels and industry will only need to surrender one NZU for two tonnes of carbon dioxide equivalent emissions. Free allocation of units to energy-intensive and trade-exposed activities will also be halved. Secondly, participants may pay a fixed price of NZ$25 instead of buying and surrendering units. This measure means that firms will face a cost of no higher than NZ$12.50 per tonne of emissions. There is a restriction on the sale of units oversea during this transition period, except for forest removal credits.

=== Delayed entry for agricultural emissions ===
Agricultural emissions, methane from enteric fermentation and manure management as well as nitrous oxide from animal effluent and fertiliser, were to enter the scheme on 1 January 2015. A 'Questions and Answers' fact sheet released by Nick Smith (Minister for Climate Change Issues) stated that the delayed entry was due to the difficulties in measuring and monitoring agricultural emissions and the limited technologies available for reducing emissions in the sector.

The economic modelling conducted by NZIER and Infometrics stated:

If the aim of climate change mitigation policies is to change producers' behaviour, it is vital to be able to measure emissions in a cost effective manner. If the transaction costs of measuring emissions outweigh the benefits of emissions reduction, the policy may not be net welfare enhancing. Therefore the transaction costs of implementing an all-sectors all-gases ETS need to be evaluated. It may be advisable to exempt sectors such as agriculture where measurement costs are high relative to the benefit that would be gained from that sector’s inclusion. Our modelling suggests that, in the short term, such exemptions do not reduce economy wide welfare.

— Stroombergen et al. 2009

The Parliamentary Commissioner for the Environment considered that there was insufficient evidence to justify leaving agriculture out of the NZ ETS until 2015. A submission from the Institute of Policy Studies (New Zealand) and The New Zealand Climate Change Research Institute considered that the delayed entry of agriculture into the NZ ETS would reduce long term competitiveness of the New Zealand economy by supporting industry that can not compete in an emissions constrained world.

== The Climate Change Response (Moderated Emissions Trading) Amendment Act 2009 ==
=== Adoption ===
On 25 November 2009, the bill had its second and third readings and it was adopted by 63 votes to 58, with the support of the National Party (58 votes), the Maori Party (4 votes) and United Future (1 vote). The Labour Party (43 votes), the Greens (9 votes), ACT (5 votes) and the Progressive Party (1 vote) voted against the third reading.

On 7 December 2009, the Climate Change Response (Moderated Emissions Trading) Amendment Act 2009 received the royal assent.

=== Coverage and scope ===
The NZ ETS covers forestry (a net sink), energy (42% of total 2012 emissions), industry (7% of total 2012 emissions) and waste (5% of total 2012 emissions) but not pastoral agriculture (46% of 2012 total emissions). Participants in the NZ ETS must surrender one emission unit (either an international 'Kyoto' unit or a New Zealand-issued unit) for every two tonnes of carbon dioxide equivalent emissions reported or they may choose to buy NZ units from the government at a fixed price of NZ$25. The one-for-two surrender obligation was phased out evenly over three years from 1 January 2017. The "one for two" or 50 percent surrender obligation increased to 67 percent from 1 January 2017, then to 83 percent from 1 January 2018, and to 1 unit for one tonne of emissions surrender obligation from 1 January 2019 for all sectors in the NZ ETS.

=== Sector entry dates ===
Individual sectors of the economy have different entry dates when their obligations to report emissions and surrender emission units took effect. Forestry, which contributed net removals of 17.5 Mts of CO_{2}e in 2010 (19% of NZ's 2008 emissions) entered the NZ ETS on 1 January 2008. The stationary energy, industrial processes and liquid fossil fuel sectors entered the NZ ETS on 1 July 2010. The waste sector (landfill operators) entered on 1 January 2013. From November 2009, methane and nitrous oxide emissions from pastoral agriculture were scheduled to be included in the NZ ETS from 1 January 2015. Agriculture was indefinitely excluded from the NZ ETS in 2013.

=== Technical Details ===
The Climate Change Response (Moderated Emissions Trading) Amendment Act 2009 established an emissions trading scheme with obligations on emissions from all sectors and all gases. From 2015, the technical details can be summarised as:

- All emissions from all sources will have obligations. This includes emissions from biological sources such as methane from enteric fermentation and nitrous oxide from animal effluent.
- Allocations will be made to firms who undertake activities that are deemed to be both 'trade-exposed' and 'emissions-intensive'. Moderately emissions intensive activities will receive allocations equal to 60% of the industry average for the financial years ending 2007, 2008 and 2009. Highly emissions intensive industries will receive allocations equal to 90% of the industry average for this period. Allocation per unit of output will decrease by 1.3% per year from 2013 (on an exponential basis rather than a summation basis).
- As allocations are based on production levels, allocations are not 'capped' at any specific level.
- Moderately emissions intensive activities are those that produce more than 800 tonnes of carbon dioxide equivalent emissions per million dollars of revenue. Highly emissions intensive activities are those that produce more than 1600 tonnes per million dollars of revenue.
  - Electricity generators will not receive allocations, however a firm may receive allocation for electricity use if it conducts an 'emissions intensive' and 'trade exposed' activity (EITE).
  - Liquid fossil fuel is excluded from allocation in all instances.
- Owners of forests planted after 31 December 1989 are able to opt into the scheme and receive units for forest sequestration. If these forests are removed from the land the owner must repay these units.
- Owners of land that was in forest on 1 January 1990 and remained in forest on 1 January 2008 must surrender emissions units if they wish to deforest land AND change the land use to a use other than forestry.
- Agricultural activities will automatically receive a 90% allocation per unit of production, phased out at a rate of 1.3% per year from 2016.

=== Sector entry dates obligations and allocations ===
The proposed sector entry dates, obligations and unit allocation terms of National's proposed NZ ETS are set out in the table below.

Sector	Entry date	Transitional obligation until December 2012 (CP1)	Unit allocation terms
pre-1990 forest	1 January 2008	Fixed surrender price NZ$25/tonne	Allocation of 60 free units per hectare to pre-1990 forests (which may be sold internationally), otherwise units to be purchased for deforestation
post-1989 forest	1 January 2008	Fixed surrender price NZ$25/tonne	Afforestation (carbon removal) earns units, otherwise units to be purchased for deforestation
Transport (Liquid fossil fuels)	1 July 2010	One emission unit for two tonnes emissions (50%) and fixed surrender price NZ$25/tonne	Units to be purchased
Stationary energy	1 July 2010	One unit for two tonnes (50%) and fixed surrender price NZ$25/tonne	Units to be purchased
Emission-intensive industrial processes that are not trade-exposed	1 July 2010	One unit for two tonnes (50%) and fixed surrender price NZ$25/tonne	Units to be purchased
Trade-exposed emission-intensive industrial processes	1 July 2010	One unit for two tonnes (50%) and fixed surrender price NZ$25/tonne	Free allocation on intensity/production basis phasing out from 2013 at 1.3% each year (In 2012, the planned annual phase out was indefinitely deferred).
Agricultural Gases (methane and nitrous oxide from biological processes)	1 January 2015	No obligation in CP1 except reporting from 1 January 2012.	Free allocation on intensity/production basis phasing out from 2016 at 1.3% each year (In 2012, the planned obligations were indefinitely deferred).
Fishing	1 July 2010	Not participants. No requirement to report emissions or surrender NZUs	700,000 NZUs (90% of 2005 emissions) allocated free to fishing quota holders until 1 January 2012.

=== Units able to be traded ===
The NZ ETS created a specific domestic emission unit for use in New Zealand, the New Zealand Unit (NZU). The NZUs are not a Kyoto unit in terms of compliance with the Kyoto Protocol, and can only be surrendered or traded within New Zealand. Assigned amount units (AAUs) issued by New Zealand under the Kyoto Protocol can be also used by emitters to meet their surrender obligations, but assigned amount units issued by other Annex B countries may not be used.

Participants in the NZ ETS are also able to purchase and surrender international Kyoto units such as Emission Reduction Units (ERUs), Certified Emission Reductions (CERs) and Removal Units (RMUs) issued in other countries. Unlike most other emissions trading schemes the NZ ETS has no limit on the volume of international units (CERs and ERUs) that may be imported. Consequently, the NZ ETS is highly linked to the international market for greenhouse gas emission units. This degree of linkage and the lack of a national cap on emissions makes New Zealand a price-taker where control of the price of emissions to firms is relinquished to the international markets.

During the transition phase (July 2010 to December 2012), only the forestry sector will be able to convert the NZUs allocated to them to assigned amount units that can be sold to overseas buyers. However, temporary CERs and iCERS cannot be used in the NZ ETS, and neither can CERs and ERUs generated from nuclear projects.

From 23 December 2011, Certified Emission Reduction (CERs) units from HFC-23 and Nitrous oxide (N_{2}O) industrial gas destruction projects were banned from use in the NZ ETS, unless they had been purchased under future delivery contracts entered into prior to 23 December 2011. The use of CERs from the future delivery contracts ended in June 2013.

== Reaction to the Climate Change Response (Moderated Emissions Trading) Act 2009 ==
=== Business and farming ===
According to Brian Fallow, the New Zealand Herald Economics editor, business lobby groups such as Business New Zealand and the Greenhouse Policy Coalition (representing the energy intensive sector) welcomed the introduction of a temporary price cap and the principle of basing free allocations of units on the basis of intensity of production.

In September 2009, the Greenhouse Policy Coalition described the proposed changes to the NZ ETS as "a welcome move in the right direction". The Coalition stated that it approved of the half-cost unit surrender obligation in the first commitment period, the $12.50 price cap on carbon, and the slower phase-out of assistance to industry.

Business New Zealand welcomed National's revisions to the NZ ETS of 14 September 2009 as better balancing environmental and economic needs, and stated that it was pleased that the Government had accepted the intensity basis for allocation of units.

The Business Council for Sustainable Development stated that New Zealand was risking "being left behind" in proposing an all-sectors, all-gases ETS that in 2015 would have almost no impact on heavy emitting industries facing international competition.

Federated Farmers commented that "there is no place for agricultural emissions in the ETS", that "the Government must seek to remove agriculture at Copenhagen in December", and that the NZ ETS is "the road to economic hell being paved with good intentions".

=== Editorial opinion ===
The New Zealand Herald described the Climate Change Response (Moderated Emissions Trading) Bill as "backward legislation" and a "miserable offering to the international effort".

The Dominion Post commented that the NZ ETS is a failure because "those responsible for the emissions don't have to foot the bill".

The New Zealand Listener stated: "Our poorly thought-out emissions trading scheme does nothing to enhance our reputation" and predicted that the lack of bi-partisan support for the NZ ETS would lead to further uncertainty in New Zealand's climate-change policy.

=== International media ===
In November 2009, the Sydney Morning Herald reported that the revised NZETS had been "significantly watered down" and that it gave "big polluters a much easier ride".

Reuters reported that the amended NZ ETS allowed unlimited imports of offsets and that business groups largely backed the changes, while environmental groups largely felt that the NZ ETS would not do enough to reduce emissions. In March 2010, Reuters reported that the NZ ETS had "no emissions cap nor any limit on the number of free carbon permits for energy-intensive companies that export their products". Reuters noted that the absence of a cap and the two-tonnes-for-one-unit surrender arrangement had led to "accusations of some big polluters getting a free ride and that the scheme will fail to cut emissions of planet-warming gases".

In March 2010, The Economist commented on the delayed entry of agriculture into the scheme and noted the environmental concerns over the "generous allocations of free carbon credits to business".

=== Commentators ===
Rod Oram commented in a Sunday Star Times column that the National Government's changes to the ETS were "a giant step backwards" which would "drive up emissions, perpetuate old technology, necessitate ever-greater subsidies and reduce New Zealand's international competitiveness and reputation." Oram considered that the amendments to the NZ ETS destroyed its effectiveness. His examples were: removing limits on emissions by adopting intensity-based allocation of free carbon credits, slavishly following climate-laggard Australia, minimising the price incentive by extending the free allocation of credits for 75 years, muting the price signal with a NZ$25 per tonne of carbon cap, forcing forestry holders of credits to sell them overseas because of the NZ$25 per tonne cap, cancelling complementary measures such as fuel efficiency standards, giving in to special pleading via subsidies, and creating uncertainty for business.

Colin James described the National ETS as "...the ETS you have when you are not having an ETS – no cap on emissions (so no "cap" in the "cap-and-trade"), a cap on price (so no "trade", just tickle the taxpayer) and languorous phase-downs of gross emissions which push out hard decisions (if needed) into a misty future."

The New Zealand Herald's economics editor Brian Fallow said: "Clearly emissions will peak higher and later than they would have done under the existing scheme. But the higher and later the peak in emissions, the steeper and more economically costly the subsequent decline will have to be".

=== Political parties ===
The Labour Party noted that the allocation of credits to emitters on a 'intensity' basis, with no cap on emissions, meant that emitters would have an incentive to continue to emit greenhouse gases. Taxpayers would have to fund the long period of assistance by allocation of free units to industry at a cost of up to NZ$2 billion by 2030.

Labour Party climate change spokesman Charles Chauvel said that the National NZ ETS "is fundamentally flawed on multiple levels. It is economically irrational, socially inequitable, environmentally counter-productive and fiscally unsustainable". Chauvel also questioned the fairness of households receiving assistance in the form of the half obligation only until 2013, when large foreign-owned companies such as Methanex, Rio Tinto Alcan NZ Ltd and New Zealand Steel would receive taxpayer support for an extra 90 years.

Jeanette Fitzsimons of the Green Party said: "This is the sort of emissions trading scheme you have when you still think climate change is a hoax" and she commented that the NZ ETS would not reduce emissions and would be "the biggest wealth transfer in New Zealand history from the taxpayer to the big polluters".

John Boscawen of the Act Party commented that the NZ ETS was a grand experiment, without precedent in any other nation in the world. Boscawen was critical of the effect that the ETS will have on households and farmers, stating that the average power bill will rise 10%, fuel bills will rise by 7 cents per litre and dairy farms will face an increase in costs before agriculture enters the scheme of NZ$7,500 per year as a result of associated increases in fuel, electricity and the cost of processing milk products. Boscawen called for the NZ ETS to be scrapped or delayed indefinitely.

=== Environmental organisations ===
Greenpeace Aotearoa New Zealand noted that the intensity-based allocation of NZ Units to industry and the slow phase-out of free units would allow emissions to grow and described the NZ ETS as "pathetic". Greenpeace's Simon Boxer described the NZETS to TV3 as "the worst emissions trading scheme in the world".

Gary Taylor, of the Environmental Defence Society, said that "An emissions-trading scheme welcomed by polluters and coal producers is not going to work" and "New Zealand is now a climate change laggard".

ECO (Environment and Conservation Organisations of Aotearoa New Zealand) described the NZ ETS as a "major disappointment" and said that "The changes allow 65 large companies long periods of subsidisation by taxpayers, particularly households, right out to 2050, with farmers and the fishing industry getting especially large subsidies."

World Wide Fund for Nature (WWF) New Zealand described the New Zealand Emissions Trading Scheme as "a complete shambles" because it sets no limit on total pollution, it allows emissions to grow and it transfers the cost of emissions from polluters to taxpayers.

Carbon Trade Watch have described it "as a taxpayer subsidy for plantations and energy companies".

=== Parliamentary Commissioner for the Environment ===
In October 2009, New Zealand's independent environmental watchdog, Jan Wright, the Parliamentary Commissioner for the Environment, made a submission to the Select Committee considering National's amendments to the NZ ETS. The submission stated that the allocation of free units to industry was too generous and the length of the phase-out of free allocation was too slow. Without a carbon price signal to invest in low carbon technologies, emissions would continue to rise.

In November 2009, Wright was sufficiently concerned that the Climate Change Response (Moderated Emissions Trading) Amendment bill would result in increased emissions that she publicly urged politicians three times not to adopt the National Government's legislation. She opposed the removal of a firm cap on emissions, the reduction of price incentives to reduce emissions, and the heavy subsidies from taxpayers granted to emissions-intensive industry and agriculture by the intensity-based allocation of free units.

When the Climate Change Response (Moderated Emissions Trading) Act was adopted, Wright said in a radio interview "It's virtually certain our emissions will grow and the burden on the taxpayer will be uncurbed".

As the energy and liquid fossil fuels were about to enter the NZ ETS in July 2010, Wright expressed her concern that although the NZ ETS was the right framework, the subsidies to big emitters would limit the incentives to reduce emissions and impose significant costs on the taxpayer.

== 2012 review of the New Zealand ETS and amendments ==
The Climate Change Response Act 2002 requires a review of the NZ ETS by an independent review panel every five years, with the first review to be completed in 2011. An Issues Statement and Call for Written Submissions document was released in March 2011, and the final report was released in September 2011. The review focused on the high-level design of the NZ ETS, particularly in the context of international efforts to tackle climate change post-2012.

The report's major recommendations included:

- phasing out the transitional two-for-one unit half-price surrender arrangement for a further three years to 2014, so that only from 2015 would emitters have to surrender one emissions unit for each tonne of emissions
- a $5 per year increase in the price cap from 2013 (instead of no price cap)
- that the agricultural sector should still enter in 2015, but should treated the same as other export industries
- changes to the domestic ETS forestry accounting rules

An editorial in the NZ Herald said that there was no merit in the Government's view that lack of mitigation options meant that agriculture should be kept out of the NZ ETS. The editorial described this as 'extraordinary generosity' to the agricultural sector.

In April 2012, the Government released a consultation document in response to the review that stated that the Government intended to introduce amending legislation in July 2012, with the aim of passing it by the end of 2012. The National Business Review considered that in spite of the "fairly cryptic" nature of the Government's response to the review of the emissions trading scheme, it was likely that pastoral farming emissions would not enter the NZ ETS until 2018.

In November 2012, the Government passed the Climate Change Response (Emissions Trading and Other Matters) Amendment Act 2012. The legislation extended the two-for-one unit surrender transitional measure indefinitely beyond 2012, indefinitely deferred the entry of agriculture, introduced an offsetting option for pre-1990 forests, created a statutory power to auction NZ units within an overall cap, and finally changed the treatment of the synthetic greenhouse gas sector. The Government stated that the amendments were necessary to:

- "maintain the costs that the ETS places on the economy at current levels. This will ensure businesses and households do not face additional costs during the continued economic recovery; and that New Zealand continues to do its fair share on climate change."
- "make a number of important changes designed to improve the operation of the ETS, providing more flexibility for forest landowners and ensuring the scheme is 'fit for purpose' after 2012."

== 2015 review of the NZETS ==
In November 2015, the government started consultation on a review of the NZETS. Controversially, the question of whether to include agriculture in the scheme was omitted from the terms of reference of the review.

== Market performance and trading ==
=== Unit register ===
On 6 December 2007, the New Zealand Emission Unit Register (NZEUR) was established. The NZEUR has the role of issuing, holding, transferring and retiring emission units in terms of the Kyoto Protocol. The initial use of the NZEUR was to record Kyoto emission units allocated to firms enrolled in the Ministry for the Environment's Projects to Reduce Emissions and Negotiated Greenhouse Agreements programmes, and the Ministry of Agriculture and Forestry's Permanent Forest Sink Initiative.

=== Market size ===
At 31 December 2008, the NZ Emissions Unit Register (NZEUR) had 128 official account holders. All were foresters except for four energy companies. 45 of the foresters reported removals (sequestration) of 692,583 tonnes of CO_{2}-e and 692,583 NZUs were issued into the market. In the year to 31 December 2009, 97 mandatory NZETS participants and 380 voluntary participants (largely post-1990 foresters) were added as NZEUR account holders. Foresters reported removals (sequestration) of 4,460,095 tonnes of CO_{2}-e. Some foresters surrendered 4,526 NZUs for emissions from deforestation. 4,460,095 NZUs were issued into the market. At 31 December 2010, there were 96 mandatory NZETS participants and 1,216 voluntary participants of which 1,195 were post-1990 foresters. Foresters reported removals (sequestration) of 9,445,606 tonnes of CO_{2}-e. The quantity of emissions reported was 33,410,389 tonnes of CO_{2}-e for the 2010 calendar year and 16,286,618 tonnes of CO_{2}-e were reported for the NZETS compliance period from 1 July 2010 to 31 December 2010. Due to the two tonnes for one NZU arrangement, emitters surrendered 8,303,660 NZUs for their emissions. 12,776,026 NZUs were issued by free allocation into the market. Forestry removals (sequestration) in the 2011 calendar year were 13,820,979 tonnes of CO_{2}-e and the quantity of emissions reported was 31,803,198 tonnes of CO_{2}-e. 11,596,460 NZUs were issued by free allocation into the market. Due to the two tonnes for one NZU arrangement, emitters surrendered 16,381,479 units for their emissions. At 21 June 2012, there were 286 mandatory NZETS participants and 2,264 voluntary participants of which 2,254 were post-1990 foresters.

=== Export of units overseas ===
In August 2009, forestry companies were selling units to domestic and international buyers. Forestry company Ernslaw One converted 520,000 NZ units into Assigned amount units and sold them to the Norwegian Government, in a deal brokered by New Zealand carbon broker, Carbon Market Solutions Ltd. At the time, it was the largest forestry carbon credit deal in the world. Industry sources estimated the prices were approximately NZ$21 to NZ$22 a tonne and that value of the trade would have been between NZ$10.9 million and NZ$11.4 million, depending on the exchange rate. Ernslaw One had also sold 50,000 units at NZ$20 (sales value about NZ$1 million worth) to a domestic buyer and then subsequently at the end of 2009 made a second 500,000 tonne trade with the Norwegian Government.

=== Import of international units ===
As previously noted, the NZ ETS allows unlimited importing of international units which makes it a price-taker with only the international price as a constraint on emissions. In the first compliance period the six months to December 2010, less than 2 per cent of the surrendered units were imported from the international Kyoto markets (64 per cent had been bought from forest owners and 31 per cent had been allocated free to trade-exposed industrial emitters). In the 2011 calendar year, emitters made a large switch from domestic NZUs to cheaper international units. Of the 16.3 million units surrendered, 11.7 million units (or 72%) were imported international units (being 4.2 million Certified Emission Reduction units (CERs) 4.3 million Emission reduction unit (ERUs) and 3.2 million removal units (RMUs). In 2013, cheap international carbon credits made up 99.5 per cent of the units participants used to meet their obligations. Of these units, 91 percent were ERUs sourced from former Soviet Union countries that could not be used in the European Union ETS.

=== Price movements ===
New Zealand petrol prices and the NZETS 'carbon price' from 2010 to date

Up to January 2011, market prices for New Zealand units were largely set by the international price for Certified Emission Reduction (CER) units. In March 2011, European concerns over the implications of the Fukushima nuclear disaster for their nuclear reactors reduced atomic power generation and increased coal thermal generation. This caused extra demand for CERs in the European Union Emission Trading Scheme and CER prices exceeded NZ$25 a tonne, the effective price cap in the NZ ETS. NZ buyers switched from the more expensive CERS to cheaper NZUs which were traded at a record price of more than NZ$21 per tonne. In July 2011, concerns over the Eurozone sovereign debt crisis combined with the high volumes of CERS being issued caused international CER prices to fall to a range between 9 and 10 euros. NZU prices fell to NZ$16.

By August 2012, the very low European carbon prices had dragged the NZU price down to NZ$4.55 per tonne of carbon. In mid September 2012, NZUs were selling for NZ$4.20 a tonne. In late October 2012, New Zealand carbon prices dropped to about NZ$1 a tonne for some types of credits. On 10 December 2012, the NZU spot price was $2.70 and it had declined by 72 percent over the 2012 year. In February 2013, Westpac's carbon dealing desk noted that imported European carbon credits were trading for 28 NZ cents and the price for NZUs was NZ$2.50. In January 2014 the price of one NZU was about NZ$3.50, up from NZ$2 a year earlier.

== Impacts on prices ==
=== Petrol ===
In September 2007, the 2008 NZETS was expected to increase the GST-inclusive retail price of petrol by 3.7 cents a litre (2.5%) under a $15 carbon price scenario and 6.1 cents (4%) under a $25 scenario. The Labour Government predicted that the NZETS may cause petrol prices to rise by about 4 cents a litre.

Between 1 July 2010 and February 2015, the estimated NZETS component of the retail petrol price has ranged from a maximum of 2.4 cents per litre from late 2010 to June 2011 to a minimum of half a cent from July 2013 to December 2014.

=== Electricity ===
In 2007, the 2008 NZETS was expected to increase the retail price of electricity by 1 cent/kwh (5%) under a $15 carbon price scenario and 2 cents/kwh (10%) under a $25 scenario. The official "NZETS Question and Answers" fact sheet of September 2007 noted that the NZETS may cause retail electricity bills to increase by 4 or 5%. In 2009 the amended NZETS was expected to increase electricity prices by 5% (1c/kWh) in comparison with an increase of by 10% (2c/kWh) under the original NZETS. In April 2011, a report prepared by consultants Covec for the Ministry for the Environment concluded that the NZETS had no discernible impact on either wholesale or retail electricity prices. In October 2012, the five major electricity generating companies were asked by officials about NZETS costs being passed through in electricity prices. The companies advised that there was no distinguishable or visible impact of the NZETS on wholesale electricity prices.

== See also ==
- Climate Change Response (Emissions Trading) Amendment Act 2008 – Act of Parliament in New Zealand
- Emissions trading – Market-based approach used to control pollution
- Emissions Trading Scheme Review Committee December 2008 – August 2009
- Energy in New Zealand
- List of climate change initiatives
