= Climate Change Response Act 2002 =

Act of Parliament in New Zealand

Climate Change Response Act

New Zealand Parliament
- Royal assent: 18 November 2002
- Commenced: 1 August 2003
- Administered by: Ministry for the Environment

Legislative history
- Passed: 2002

Amended by
- Climate Change Response (Emissions Trading) Amendment Act 2008; Climate Change Response (Moderated Emissions Trading) Amendment Act 2009; Climate Change Response (Zero Carbon) Amendment Act 2019 (2019/61); Climate Change Response (Emissions Trading Reform) Amendment Act 2020
- Status: Current legislation

The Climate Change Response Act 2002 is an Act of Parliament passed by the New Zealand Government.

The Climate Change Response Act 2002 created a legal framework for New Zealand to ratify the Kyoto Protocol and to meet obligations under the United Nations Framework Convention on Climate Change. It sets out powers for the Minister of Finance to manage New Zealand's holdings of Assigned amount units and to trade Kyoto-compliant emission units (carbon credits) on the international market. It establishes a registry to record holdings and transfers of emission units. It establishes a national inventory agency to record and report greenhouse gas emissions.

The legislative purposes of the Climate Change Response Act 2002 are;

- to develop and implement clear and stable climate change policies that contribute to the global effort under the Paris Agreement to limit the global average temperature increase to 1.5 °C above pre-industrial levels; and to adapt to the effects of climate change.
- to enable New Zealand to meet its obligations under the United Nations Framework Convention on Climate Change and the Kyoto Protocol, and,
- to provide for the New Zealand Emissions Trading Scheme for greenhouse gases that reduces net emissions below business-as-usual levels.

The Climate Change Response (Emissions Trading) Amendment Act 2008 established the Fifth Labour Government of New Zealand's version of the New Zealand Emissions Trading Scheme in September 2008.

Part 4 of the Climate Change Response Act sets out the New Zealand Emissions Trading Scheme. On 8 May 2019, the Government introduced the Climate Change Response (Zero Carbon) Amendment Bill to Parliament. The Climate Change Response (Zero Carbon) Amendment Bill received royal assent on 13 November 2019.

== See also ==
- Climate change in New Zealand
- Climate Change Response (Zero Carbon) Amendment Bill
- New Zealand Emissions Trading Scheme
- New Zealand environmental law
- Politics of global warming
