= Fifth Labour Government of New Zealand =

Government of New Zealand from 1999 to 2008

Fifth Labour Government
- Ministry of New Zealand
- 1999–2008
- Ministry in October 2005
- Date formed: 10 December 1999
- Date dissolved: 19 November 2008

People and organisations
- Monarch: Elizabeth II
- Governor-General: Sir Michael Hardie Boys (1999–2001); Dame Silvia Cartwright (2001–2006); Sir Anand Satyanand (2006–2008)
- Prime Minister: Helen Clark
- Deputy Prime Minister: Jim Anderton (1999–2002); Michael Cullen (2002–2008)
- Member parties: Labour Party; Alliance (1999–2002); Progressive (2002–2008); Green Party (1999–2002) as confidence and supply (2002–2008) within a cooperation agreement; New Zealand First (2005–2008) as confidence and supply; United Future (2002–2008) as confidence and supply
- Status in legislature: Minority (coalition)
- Opposition party: National Party; ACT Party; Māori Party (2005–2008); New Zealand First (1999–2005); United New Zealand (1999–2002)
- Opposition leader: Jenny Shipley (1999–2001); Bill English (2001–2003); Don Brash (2003–2006); John Key (2006–2008)

History
- Elections: 1999 general election; 2002 general election; 2005 general election
- Legislature terms: 46th Parliament; 47th Parliament; 48th Parliament
- Budgets: 2006 budget; 2007 budget; 2008 budget
- Predecessor: Fourth National Government of New Zealand
- Successor: Fifth National Government of New Zealand

The Fifth Labour Government of New Zealand was the government of New Zealand from 10 December 1999 to 19 November 2008. Labour Party leader Helen Clark negotiated a coalition with Jim Anderton, leader of the Alliance Party.

== Overview ==
The previous government, the fourth National government, had been in power since 1990. It was widely unpopular by 1999, with much of the public antagonised by a series of free-market economic reforms, and was bedevilled by weakness and instability. In the 1999 general election, the Helen Clark-led Labour Party defeated the National Party easily, becoming the largest single party in the House of Representatives. Labour formed a minority coalition government with the left-leaning Alliance party, supported by the Green Party.

During its first term, the government pursued a number of reforms. The controversial Employment Contracts Act was repealed, replaced by an Employment Relations Act more friendly to unions and collective bargaining; a state-owned bank, Kiwibank, was created at the behest of the Alliance; a majority stake in the national airline, Air New Zealand, was purchased; and the public health sector was reorganised with the re-establishment of partly elected district health boards. Closing the Gaps, an affirmative action strategy targeting socio-economic inequalities between Māori and Pasifika ethnic groups and other groups, was a particularly controversial reform among right-wing National and ACT voters.

With the disintegration of the Alliance in 2002, Helen Clark called a snap election, even though she still had the confidence of the House. Labour handily won the election. The Alliance failed to return to parliament, although a rump returned as Jim Anderton's Progressives. Labour formed a coalition with the Progressives, and turned to the centrist United Future party for confidence and supply. This second term was notable largely for its social and constitutional legislation, with the Government establishing a Supreme Court and ending appeals to the Privy Council, decriminalising prostitution, and providing for civil unions, the latter two changes in particular supported by the Green Party and opposed by United Future. The Government was also faced in this term with the foreshore and seabed controversy. While Labour, in cooperation with the New Zealand First party, eventually resolved the legal dispute by vesting foreshore and seabed title in the Crown, a dissident Labour minister, Tariana Turia, formed the Māori Party, while on the other side of the spectrum a resurgent National Party, now under former Reserve Bank governor Don Brash, became considerably more popular. In the 2005 election, the Government was returned with a slim margin on the strength of the Working for Families assistance package and financial assistance to students, benefiting also from mistakes in National's campaign.

Helen Clark moved even more to the centre, enlisting support for her Government from both New Zealand First and United Future. Greens were excluded from the resulting coalition, due to a refusal by United Future and NZ First to work with the Greens in cabinet. They were, however, able to negotiate a cooperation agreement which saw limited input into the budget and broad consultation on policy. Almost immediately, the Government parties became involved in a protracted funding scandal, having apparently used public money for party political purposes during the election campaign. A heavy-handed attempt at campaign finance reform later in this term also harmed the Government, which by now appeared tired and at a loss for direction, although it did succeed in implementing a wide range of social and economic reforms during its time in office.

In a 2000 feature article "Siege of Helengrad", The Australian newspaper wrote that Clark's "uncompromisingly autocratic and pervasive leadership has seen New Zealand dubbed Helengrad". In January 2008, the term 'Helengrad', "a noun used to describe the iron grip of New Zealand's prime minister over Wellington", was reported as having made Australia's Macquarie online dictionary among 85 other new words.

In the 2008 election, the Labour Party lost convincingly to National, and the government was succeeded by the National Party led by John Key as Prime Minister.

== Significant policies ==
=== Economic ===
- Created Kiwibank as part of coalition agreement with the Alliance (2001).
- Created the New Zealand Superannuation Fund (2001);
- KiwiSaver retirement savings scheme (2007);
- Purchased a majority stake in Air New Zealand (2001);
- Renationalised New Zealand's national rail network (Under ONTRACK) (2004), and in 2008 the rail and ferry operations of Toll New Zealand (renamed KiwiRail). KiwiRail and ONTRACK were then merged into one organisation;
- Buy Kiwi Made campaign (2007);
- Telecommunications industry reform, particularly local loop unbundling (2007).
- Increased top income tax rate to 39% (2000).
- Company and personal income tax cuts under the 2008 New Zealand budget.
- Began the Crown Retail Deposit Guarantee Scheme, deposit insurance for New Zealand financial institutions during the Great Recession (2008).

=== Constitutional ===
- Established the Supreme Court of New Zealand, replacing appeals to the Judicial Committee of the Privy Council (2004).
- Constitutional Inquiry into the Constitution of New Zealand.
- Passed the Electoral Finance Act to reform electoral spending and regulate electoral advertising (2007).

=== Treaty of Waitangi ===
- New Zealand foreshore and seabed controversy; passed the Foreshore and Seabed Act (2004).
- Marine and Coastal Area (Takutai Moana) Act 2011

Treaty settlements:

Aspects of the Clark-led governments actions in relation to the Treaty of Waitangi is shown through settlements.

- Treaty 2U exhibition funding
- New Zealand School Curriculum launch
- Moriori heritage and Identity preservation
- Te Arawa Apology
- Te Uri O Hau
- Waitangi Day Commemorative Fund
- Fisheries Scholarship

=== Social policy ===
- Within 3 weeks of taking office, the government had announced an increase in the minimum wage, removed the interest on student loans for full-time and low-income students while they were still studying, announced the reversal of accident compensation deregulation, and introduced legislation to increase taxation for those on higher incomes.
- Introduced paid parental leave of 12 weeks (2001), increasing to 14 weeks by the end of the government.
- The Working for Families package was introduced in 2004, which significantly improved social welfare assistance for low-income families and contributed to a reduction in child poverty from 28% in 2004 to 22% in 2007.
- The wage-related floor of the state pension was restored.
- The Housing Restructuring Amendment Bill (2000) provided for income-related rents and set them at 25% of household income making community housing much more affordable than it had become under the previous Government's market rental strategy.
- Equity Funding was introduced (2002), which provided additional funding to community-based ECE services most in need.
- Research funding was increased.
- The New Zealand Transport Strategy (released in December 2002) provided increased funding for initiatives to promote the use of buses, trains, cycling and walking.
- The minimum wage was increased by more than 5% each year (well above the rate of inflation) during the labour-led government's second term.
- The Health and Safety in Employment Amendment Act (2002) served to make the principal Act more comprehensive by covering more industries and more conditions.
- The ring-fencing of mental health money and the creation of more than 800 FTE mental health staff positions see this promise coded as fulfilled representing a 100% fulfilment rate for this policy area.
- ICT was expanded to students in remote areas so they could receive specialist teaching.
- Holidays Act 2003

The Holidays Act (2003) entitled employees to receive "time and a half" for working on any statutory holiday from 2004 onwards and provided for four weeks' annual leave from 2007 onwards. However, in 2016 MBIE found problems with underpayments on holiday pay due to the complex act, which had not been resolved by 2021.

- Passed the Prostitution Reform Act 2003
- Passed the Property (Relationships) Act: treats de facto relationships the same as after the breakup of legal marriages, unless the individuals in the relationship contract out of the Act;
- Civil Union Act 2004
- Supported the Crimes (Substituted Section 59) Amendment Act 2007, which repealed and replaced section 59 of the Crimes Act 1961, which allowed "reasonable force" in the discipline of children.
- National Statement on Religious Diversity (2007)
- National Superannuation payments for married couples were increased (2000).
- A Parental Tax Credit was introduced (2000).
- A Child Tax Credit (which replaced the independent Family Tax Credit) was introduced (2000).
- A Family Tax Credit (which was formerly the Guaranteed Minimum Family income) was introduced (2000).
- A Modern Apprentices initiative was introduced to develop technological skills (2000).
- The Family Start programme was expanded (2000).
- Annual inflation to benefits was introduced (2000).
- Closing the Gaps policy platform introduced (2000).
- The Social Security Amendment Act of 2001 introduced various changes such as "disestablishment of the Community Wage, re-establishment of an unemployment benefit and non-work-tested sickness benefit, and the abolition of the work capacity assessment process".
- The Social Security Amendment Act (2006) established three streams for reintegrating beneficiaries into the larger community. These included a work support stream for the unemployed, a work support development stream for most other beneficiaries, and a community support stream for a small group to be exempted from work, training or planning requirements.
- Income-related rents for state-owned housing were restored (2000).
- A social allocation system was introduced and implemented with the income-related rents scheme(2000).
- Vacant sales were frozen and the Home Buy programme was ended (2000).
- Bulk funding for schools was ended (2000).
- Expenditure was increased, or newly allocated, for the reduction of attrition of students from school, tertiary education subsidies, Maori and Pacific peoples' teacher recruitment, and Homework Centres (2000).
- Interest on student loans while students are studying was abolished, while the decision of the Fourth National Government to increase the student loan repayment rate was reversed (2000).
- Interest on student loans abolished for borrowers who remain in New Zealand (or studying overseas).
- Tertiary student fees were kept stable (2001).
- Expenditure for early childhood education was increased (2001).
- The National Certificate of Educational Achievement was established (2001).
- New funding was provided for principals' leadership and professional development (2001).
- An In Work Payment was introduced to replace the Child Tax Credit.
- The ministries that handled work and income and those that did social policy were merged to create a new Ministry of Social Development (2001).

=== Health ===
- Creation of district health boards (2000).
- Dissolution of the Health Funding Authority, with its responsibilities given to the Ministry of Health and the district health boards.
- Introduction of the Primary Health Care Strategy, moving primary care funding towards capitation ('bulk funding'), and away from fee-for-service funding (2001).

=== Environment ===
- Royal Commission on Genetically Modified Organisms
- Sandra Lee enacted the Local Government Act 2002 (New Zealand).
- In 2002, the Climate Change Response Act 2002 was enacted in order to ratify Kyoto Protocol to the UNFCCC.
- In September 2008, the New Zealand Emissions Trading Scheme was enacted through the Climate Change Response (Emissions Trading) Amendment Act 2008.

=== National identity ===
- Completed Establishing a fully New Zealand-based honours system (2000).

=== Foreign affairs ===
- Signed free trade agreements with Brunei, Chile, China, Singapore, and Thailand.
- Scrapped the combat wing of the Royal New Zealand Air Force.
- Sent a detachment of SAS troops to the war in Afghanistan.
- Sent troops to Solomon Islands as part of the Regional Assistance Mission to Solomon Islands
- Sent troops to East Timor during the 2006 East Timorese crisis.
- Sent troops and police to Tonga after the 2006 Nuku‘alofa riots.
- Did not send combat troops to the Iraq War.
- Launched Project Protector, to expand the Royal New Zealand Navy's capacity.
- Launched free trade negotiations with South Korea and Japan.

== Appointments ==
The following positions were appointed by the Queen on the advice of the Government:

=== Governor-General ===
- The Hon. Dame Silvia Cartwright (2001–2006)
- The Right Hon. Sir Anand Satyanand (2006–2011)

=== Supreme Court ===
With the creation of the Supreme Court of New Zealand in 2003, the government appointed the first full bench of the Court.

- Chief Justice The Right Hon. Dame Sian Elias (1 July 2004)
- Justice The Hon. Sir Thomas Gault (1 July 2004)
- Justice The Hon. Sir Kenneth Keith (1 July 2004)
- Justice The Hon. Sir Peter Blanchard (1 July 2004)
- Justice The Hon. Sir Andrew Tipping (1 July 2004)
- Justice The Hon. John McGrath (4 May 2005)
- Justice The Hon. Sir Noel Crossley Anderson (21 February 2006)
- Justice The Hon. Bill Wilson (21 December 2007)

Acting judges were also appointed from the retired judges of the Court of Appeal:

- The Hon. Justice Sir John Henry
- The Hon. Justice Sir Ted Thomas
- Former President of the Court of Appeal Sir Ivor Richardson
- Former Chief Justice Sir Thomas Eichelbaum.

=== Court of Appeal ===
The government appointed three presidents of the Court of Appeal of New Zealand:

- The Right Hon. Sir William Young, KNZM 23 February 2006 – 1 July 2010
- The Hon Sir Noel Crossley Anderson, KNZM 1 January 2004 – 23 February 2006
- The Right Hon. Sir Thomas Gault, KNZM 24 May 2002 – 31 December 2003

== History ==
=== 1999 election ===
The Fifth Labour government was elected in the 1999 general election, after entering a coalition with the Alliance Party and a confidence and supply agreement with the Green Party. Labour managed to increase their percentage of the votes by 10.5% and won 12 more seats than in the 1996 election. With this coalition in place the Labour Party returned to government for the first time in nine years, and Helen Clark became New Zealand's first elected female prime minister. The 1999 election was Labour's first successful MMP election.

=== 2002 election ===
The 2002 election was held a few weeks before the Parliamentary term elapsed. This had only occurred twice before in New Zealand's political history, in 1951 and 1984. The Government cited the collapse of the Alliance Party, with whom they had entered a coalition in 1999, as the reason for the earlier date. The Alliance Party had split after Jim Anderton, their leader, left to form the Progressive Coalition Party. However, some critics believe that Labour could have continued to govern for the remaining few weeks. They say that the election was called early to capitalise on high opinion poll ratings before they could be undermined by a potential softening in the New Zealand economic performance.

After initial polls indicated Labour might win enough seats to govern alone, a feat that had never occurred under MMP in New Zealand, they won 41.3% of the vote and 52 seats. Although this was an improvement on their results in the 1999 election, it was not enough to govern alone, and Labour entered a coalition with the Progressive Coalition Party, and a confidence and supply agreement with United Future. Labour's success was highlighted by the National Party's demise, as they accrued a record low 20.9% of the vote.

=== 2005 election ===
After initial doubt as to what date the election would be held, 17 September was the chosen day. After falling behind National in the initial opinion polls, Labour fought back to obtain 41.1% of the vote. Although this was a 0.2% decrease from the previous election, it still saw them sit ahead of National by 2%. The 2005 election saw a dramatic fall in the success of the minor parties. New Zealand First and United Future each won less than half of the percentage of total votes they achieved in 2002. In order to reach the required majority, Labour entered confidence and supply agreements with New Zealand First and United Future. This was in addition to a coalition agreement with the Progressive Coalition Party, of whom only Jim Anderton obtained a seat.

The newly formed Maori Party accrued four seats. After only being formed in 2004 as a result of the controversial Foreshore and Seabed Act, they oversaw a successful campaign based on a critical assessment of Labour's record with Maori issues. Their success was highlighted by the decline of ACT New Zealand, who won two seats, and the Progressive Coalition and United Future, who each won only a single seat.

== Election results ==
The table below shows the total party votes for Labour and parties that supported the Labour-led government. For more details of election results, see the election articles.

Election	Parliament	Seats	Total votes	Percentage	Gain (loss)	Seats won	Change	Majority
1999	46th	120	1,066,618	51.64%	-	66	-	12
2002	47th	120	1,150,911	56.65%	+5.01%	71	+10	22
2005	48th	121	1,152,735	50.65%	-6.00%	61	-10	1
2008	49th	122	1,091,587	Lab 33.99%, Progressive 0.91, NZF 4.07%, UF 0.87, Green 6.72	Lab −7.11%, Progressive -0.25, NZF −1.65%, UF -1.80, Green + 1.42	Lab 43, Progressive 1, NZF 0, UF 1, Green 9	Lab −8, Progressive =1, NZF −7, UF -2, Green +3	-

Notes

- Following the 1999 election, Labour formed a coalition with the Alliance Party, and gained support on matters of confidence and supply from the Greens.
- Following the 2002 election, Labour formed a coalition with the Progressive Party, and gained support on matters of confidence and supply from United Future. The Greens also entered into a formal agreement with the government, but it was not as strong as the agreements covering confidence and supply it made in the preceding and following parliaments.
- Following the 2005 election, Labour formed a coalition with the Progressive Party, and gained support on matters of confidence and supply from New Zealand First and United Future, giving the Labour-led Government a majority. The Greens signed an agreement to abstain on votes of confidence and supply, and the Māori Party also abstained on confidence and supply votes but had no formal agreement with the Government.

== Prime minister ==
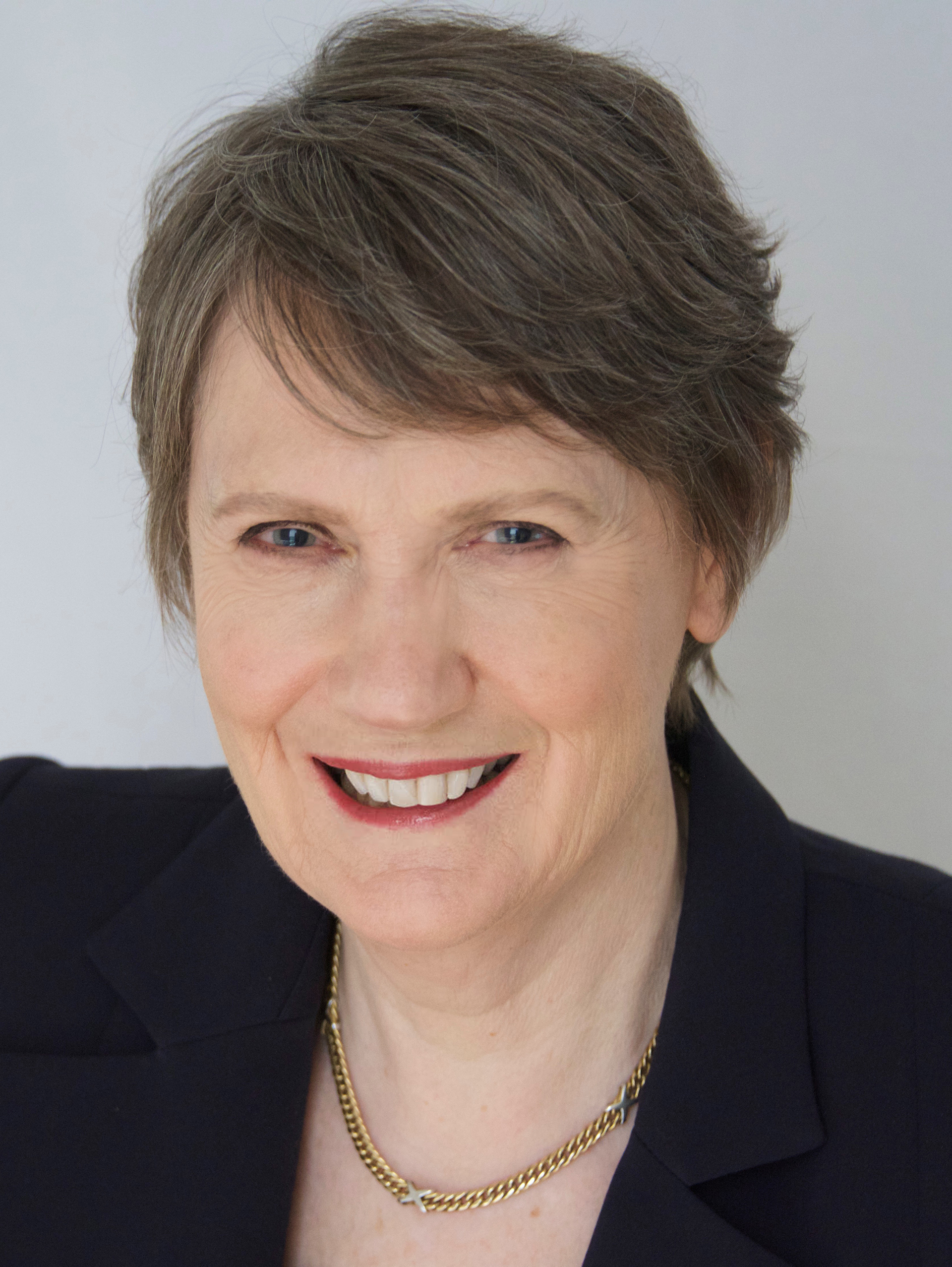
Helen Clark, prime minister from 1999 to 2008

Helen Clark was Prime Minister from when the government was elected in 1999 until it was defeated by the National Party in the 2008 elections.

== Cabinet Ministers ==
Portfolio	Minister	Party	Start	End
Prime Minister	Helen Clark	Labour	10 December 1999	19 November 2008
Deputy Prime Minister	Jim Anderton	Alliance	10 December 1999	15 August 2002
Deputy Prime Minister	Michael Cullen	Labour	15 August 2002	19 November 2008
Minister of Agriculture	Jim Sutton	Labour	10 December 1999	19 October 2005
Minister of Agriculture	Jim Anderton	Progressive	19 October 2005	19 November 2008
Minister for Arts, Culture and Heritage	Helen Clark	Labour	10 December 1999	19 November 2008
Attorney-General	Margaret Wilson	Labour	10 December 1999	28 February 2005
Attorney-General	Michael Cullen	Labour	28 February 2005	19 October 2005
Attorney-General	David Parker	Labour	19 October 2005	20 March 2006
Attorney-General	Michael Cullen	Labour	21 March 2006	19 November 2008
Minister of Broadcasting	Marian Hobbs	Labour	10 December 1999	23 February 2001
Minister of Broadcasting	Steve Maharey	Labour	23 February 2001	27 March 2001
Minister of Broadcasting	Marian Hobbs	Labour	27 March 2001	15 August 2002
Minister of Broadcasting	David Cunliffe	Labour	15 August 2002	19 November 2008
Minister for Civil Defence	George Hawkins	Labour	10 December 1999	19 October 2005
Minister for Civil Defence	Rick Barker	Labour	19 October 2005	19 November 2008
Minister of Commerce	Paul Swain	Labour	10 December 1999	15 August 2002
Minister of Commerce	Lianne Dalziel	Labour	15 August 2002	21 February 2004
Minister of Commerce	Margaret Wilson	Labour	21 February 2004	21 December 2004
Minister of Commerce	Pete Hodgson	Labour	21 December 2004	19 October 2005
Minister of Commerce	Lianne Dalziel	Labour	19 October 2005	19 November 2008
Minister of Conservation	Sandra Lee	Alliance	10 December 1999	15 August 2002
Minister of Conservation	Chris Carter	Labour	15 August 2002	31 October 2007
Minister of Conservation	Steve Chadwick	Labour	31 October 2007	19 November 2008
Minister of Consumer Affairs	Phillida Bunkle	Alliance	10 December 1999	23 February 2001
Minister of Consumer Affairs	Jim Anderton	Alliance	23 February 2001	15 August 2002
Minister of Consumer Affairs	Judith Tizard	Labour	15 August 2002	19 November 2008
Minister of Corrections	Matt Robson	Alliance	10 December 1999	15 August 2002
Minister of Corrections	Mark Gosche	Labour	15 August 2002	19 May 2003
Minister of Corrections	Paul Swain	Labour	19 May 2003	19 October 2005
Minister of Corrections	Damien O'Connor	Labour	19 October 2005	2 November 2007
Minister of Corrections	Phil Goff	Labour	2 November 2007	19 November 2008
Minister of Customs	Phillida Bunkle	Alliance	10 December 1999	23 February 2001
Minister of Customs	Jim Anderton	Alliance	23 February 2001	15 August 2002
Minister of Customs	Rick Barker	Labour	15 August 2002	19 October 2005
Minister of Customs	Nanaia Mahuta	Labour	19 October 2005	19 November 2008
Minister of Defence	Mark Burton	Labour	10 December 1999	19 October 2005
Minister of Defence	Phil Goff	Labour	19 October 2005	19 November 2008
Minister of Economic Development	Jim Anderton	Alliance	10 December 1999	19 October 2005
Minister of Economic Development	Trevor Mallard	Labour	19 October 2005	2 November 2007
Minister of Economic Development	Pete Hodgson	Labour	2 November 2007	19 November 2008
Minister of Education	Trevor Mallard	Labour	10 December 1999	19 October 2005
Minister of Education	Steve Maharey	Labour	19 October 2005	31 October 2007
Minister of Education	Chris Carter	Labour	31 October 2007	19 November 2008
Minister of Energy	Pete Hodgson	Labour	10 December 1999	21 December 2004
Minister of Energy	Trevor Mallard	Labour	21 December 2004	19 October 2005
Minister of Energy	David Parker	Labour	19 October 2005	21 March 2006
Minister of Energy	Trevor Mallard	Labour	21 March 2006	3 May 2006
Minister of Energy	David Parker	Labour	3 May 2006	19 November 2008
Minister for the Environment	Marian Hobbs	Labour	10 December 1999	19 October 2005
Minister for the Environment	David Benson-Pope	Labour	19 October 2005	27 July 2007
Minister for the Environment	Trevor Mallard	Labour	27 July 2007	19 November 2008
Minister of Finance	Michael Cullen	Labour	10 December 1999	19 November 2008
Minister of Fisheries	Pete Hodgson	Labour	10 December 1999	26 February 2004
Minister of Fisheries	David Benson-Pope	Labour	26 February 2004	19 October 2005
Minister of Fisheries	Jim Anderton	Progressive	19 October 2005	19 November 2008
Minister of Foreign Affairs	Phil Goff	Labour	10 December 1999	19 October 2005
Minister of Foreign Affairs	Winston Peters	NZ First	19 October 2005	29 August 2008
Minister of Foreign Affairs	Helen Clark	Labour	29 August 2008	19 November 2008
Minister of Forestry	Pete Hodgson	Labour	10 December 1999	15 August 2002
Minister of Forestry	Parekura Horomia	Labour	15 August 2002	19 October 2005
Minister of Forestry	Jim Anderton	Progressive	19 October 2005	19 November 2008
Minister of Health	Annette King	Labour	10 December 1999	19 October 2005
Minister of Health	Pete Hodgson	Labour	19 October 2005	31 October 2007
Minister of Health	David Cunliffe	Labour	31 October 2007	19 November 2008
Minister of Housing	Mark Gosche	Labour	10 December 1999	12 May 2003
Minister of Housing	Steve Maharey	Labour	12 May 2003	19 October 2005
Minister of Housing	Chris Carter	Labour	19 October 2005	5 November 2007
Minister of Housing	Maryan Street	Labour	5 November 2007	19 November 2008
Minister of Immigration	Lianne Dalziel	Labour	10 December 1999	21 February 2004
Minister of Immigration	Paul Swain	Labour	21 February 2004	19 October 2005
Minister of Immigration	David Cunliffe	Labour	19 October 2005	11 November 2007
Minister of Immigration	Clayton Cosgrove	Labour	11 November 2007	19 November 2008
Minister of Internal Affairs	Mark Burton	Labour	10 December 1999	13 November 2000
Minister of Internal Affairs	George Hawkins	Labour	13 November 2000	19 October 2005
Minister of Internal Affairs	Rick Barker	Labour	19 October 2005	19 November 2008
Minister of Justice	Phil Goff	Labour	10 December 1999	19 October 2005
Minister of Justice	Mark Burton	Labour	19 October 2005	31 October 2007
Minister of Justice	Annette King	Labour	31 October 2007	19 November 2008
Minister of Labour	Margaret Wilson	Labour	10 December 1999	26 February 2004
Minister of Labour	Paul Swain	Labour	26 February 2004	19 October 2005
Minister of Labour	Ruth Dyson	Labour	19 October 2005	5 November 2007
Minister of Labour	Trevor Mallard	Labour	5 November 2007	19 November 2008
Leader of the House	Michael Cullen	Labour	10 December 1999	19 November 2008
Minister of Māori Affairs	Dover Samuels	Labour	10 December 1999	28 June 2000
Minister of Māori Affairs	Parekura Horomia	Labour	28 June 2000	19 November 2008
Minister of Local Government	Sandra Lee	Alliance	10 December 1999	15 August 2002
Minister of Local Government	Chris Carter	Labour	15 August 2002	19 October 2005
Minister of Local Government	Nanaia Mahuta	Labour	19 October 2005	19 November 2008
Minister of Police	George Hawkins	Labour	10 December 1999	19 October 2005
Minister of Police	Annette King	Labour	19 October 2005	19 November 2008
Minister of Revenue	Michael Cullen	Labour	10 December 1999	19 October 2005
Minister of Revenue	Peter Dunne	United Future	19 October 2005	19 November 2008
Minister for Social Welfare	Steve Maharey	Labour	10 December 1999	19 October 2005
Minister for Social Welfare	David Benson-Pope	Labour	19 October 2005	27 July 2007
Minister for Social Welfare	Steve Maharey	Labour	27 July 2007	31 October 2007
Minister for Social Welfare	Ruth Dyson	Labour	31 October 2007	19 November 2008
Minister for Sport	Trevor Mallard	Labour	10 December 1999	31 October 2007
Minister for Sport	Clayton Cosgrove	Labour	31 October 2007	19 November 2008
Minister for State Owned Enterprises	Mark Burton	Labour	10 December 1999	21 December 2004
Minister for State Owned Enterprises	Paul Swain	Labour	21 December 2004	19 October 2005
Minister for State Owned Enterprises	Trevor Mallard	Labour	19 October 2005	19 November 2008
Minister of Statistics	Paul Swain	Labour	10 December 1999	13 November 2000
Minister of Statistics	Laila Harré	Alliance	13 November 2000	15 August 2002
Minister of Statistics	John Tamihere	Labour	15 August 2002	15 October 2004
Minister of Statistics	Michael Cullen	Labour	15 October 2004	21 December 2004
Minister of Statistics	Pete Hodgson	Labour	21 December 2004	19 October 2005
Minister of Statistics	Clayton Cosgrove	Labour	19 October 2005	5 November 2007
Minister of Statistics	Darren Hughes	Labour	5 November 2007	19 November 2008
Minister of Tourism	Mark Burton	Labour	10 December 1999	19 October 2005
Minister of Tourism	Damien O'Connor	Labour	19 October 2005	19 November 2008
Minister of Trade	Jim Sutton	Labour	15 August 2002	19 October 2005
Minister of Trade	Phil Goff	Labour	19 October 2005	19 November 2008
Minister of Transport	Mark Gosche	Labour	10 December 1999	15 August 2002
Minister of Transport	Paul Swain	Labour	15 August 2002	26 February 2004
Minister of Transport	Pete Hodgson	Labour	26 February 2004	19 October 2005
Minister of Transport	David Parker	Labour	19 October 2005	21 March 2006
Minister of Transport	Annette King	Labour	21 March 2006	19 November 2008
Treasurer	Michael Cullen	Labour	10 December 1999	19 November 2008
Minister for Treaty of Waitangi Negotiations	Margaret Wilson	Labour	10 December 1999	28 February 2005
Minister for Treaty of Waitangi Negotiations	Mark Burton	Labour	28 February 2005	31 October 2007
Minister for Treaty of Waitangi Negotiations	Michael Cullen	Labour	31 October 2007	19 November 2008
Minister for Women	Laila Harré	Alliance	10 December 1999	15 August 2002
Minister for Women	Ruth Dyson	Labour	15 August 2002	19 October 2005
Minister for Women	Lianne Dalziel	Labour	19 October 2005	5 November 2007
Minister for Women	Steve Chadwick	Labour	5 November 2007	19 November 2008
