= 2008 New Zealand budget =

- Submitted by: Michael Cullen
- Country: New Zealand
- Parliament: Parliament of New Zealand
- Party: Labour
- Total revenue: ▲$61.9 billion
- Total expenditures: ▲$61.9b billion
- Surplus: ▼$3.1 billion
- Debt: ▲$1.8 billion (Net) ▲1% (Net debt of GDP)
- Website: http://www.treasury.govt.nz/budget/2008
- ^{ǂ}Numbers in italics are projections.

The New Zealand budget for fiscal year 2008-2009 was presented to the New Zealand House of Representatives by Finance Minister Dr Michael Cullen on 22 May 2008.

This was the ninth budget Michael Cullen has presented as Minister of Finance, and his last before the Fifth Labour Government was defeated at the 2008 general election.

== Outline ==
The New Zealand economy went into recession in the last quarter of 2007, putting significant strain on the Government's accounts.

== Tax changes ==
The 2008 budget reduced income tax on the first $9,500 earned from 15% to 12.5%, and the company tax rate from 30% to 29%.
