= Closing the Gaps =

New Zealand Government policy

Closing the Gaps was a policy of the Fifth Labour Government of New Zealand for assisting socio-economically disadvantaged Māori and Pasifika ethnic groups in New Zealand through specially targeted social programmes. The phrase "Closing the Gaps" was a slogan of the Labour Party in the 1999 election campaign and was implemented as a policy initiative in the 2000 Budget.

== Overview ==
The aim of Closing the Gaps was to reduce the most visible disparities in socio-economic status and opportunity between Māori and Pacific Islander groups and other groups. The policy had a social development and social inclusion approach to social policy. Closing the Gaps aimed to balance individual and collective rights and responsibilities by integrating Māori and Pacific Islanders more extensively into the paid labour market.

== Context ==
The socio-economic gaps between Māori and non-Māori stem from a history of colonialism. Land alienation and the Māori labour migration resulted in structural inequalities in socio-economic status between Māori and non-Māori, a central concern of Closing the Gaps. These inequalities were exacerbated by the neoliberal policy reforms pursued by the Fourth Labour and Fourth National governments. Increasing inequality throughout the 1980s and 90s disproportionately affected Māori and Pacific Islanders, who were over-represented at the bottom of New Zealand's socio-economic landscape.

Closing the Gaps was a policy typical of Third Way political philosophy, popular throughout the West in the early 2000s. Third Way politics reconciles neoliberalism with social democratic ideals to mitigate the inequalities caused by neoliberal economic and political systems. Hence, Closing the Gaps is recognizant of the global political context it inhabited.

Closing the Gaps was a direct response to the findings of the 1998 Te Puni Kōkiri report "Progress Towards Closing the Social and Economic Gaps Between Māori and non-Māori", which outlined these accumulating inequalities Māori and Pacific Islanders encountered. The report's overall findings revealed the gaps between Māori and non-Māori in education, employment, economic and health status were significant. Furthermore, the report revealed these gaps had stabilized or were widening, not reducing. The Closing the Gaps report was the first government publication to measure inequalities between Māori and non-Māori, both setting a benchmark for policy, and providing an impetus for the Fifth Labour-led Government to reduce inequality.

== Policy outline ==
- Investment in schools, polytechnics, universities, housing agencies and hospitals.
- Investment in Māori and Pacific Islander controlled and managed organisations.
- $12 million in additional funding to Te Puni Kōkiri over four years to improve the government's information base and monitoring capability in order to more effectively measure outcomes of social policy programmes for Māori.
- Departmental chief executives required to disclose in their annual reports the steps taken in their departments towards closing socio-economic gaps between Māori and Pacific Islanders and others.
- $114 million towards capacity building initiatives for Māori and Pacific Islander communities.
- $8 million in additional funding to the Māori Land Court over four years.
- Creation of a provisional fund of $50 million for Closing the Gaps initiatives developed between budgets.

== Public opinion ==
Closing the Gaps was recognised as one of the foremost efforts of the 2000s to combat the heavy systemic racism Māori suffered in New Zealand. Doing so would promote equity for Māori, with the ultimate goal of total equality. Naturally, however, the National Party led a campaign to stoke fears among its heavily European New Zealander base that the efforts were "unfairly privileging" Māori and "threatening social cohesion". In June 2000, Winston Peters, leader of the New Zealand First party, described the program as "social apartheid". The responses from the opposition and the public reflected the perspective that Māori rights under the Treaty of Waitangi were special privileges that actively excluded non-Māori from their rights and privileges as New Zealand citizens. The perspective that Māori were being unfairly privileged by Closing the Gaps gained popularity because the policy was portrayed as undermining an equality of opportunity approach to social policy that was popular in New Zealand.

Perspectives on Closing the Gaps was more varied within the Maori community. While the benefits Māori communities received from the policy led to Closing the Gaps being perceived positively by many Māori, critics argued the policy was ultimately damaging for Māori because it perpetuated negative stereotypes that normalised and reinforced Pākehā dominance. Māori Labour Party politicians promoted the policy as providing greater autonomy and self-determination for Māori under the partnership principle of the Treaty of Waitangi. Contrastingly, it was argued that by encouraging assimilation to Western values, Closing the Gaps continued to marginalise Māori culture by portraying Māoridom, and consequently Māori socio-economic disadvantage, as deviant. Additionally, a focus on individual responsibility for reducing socio-economic gaps was criticised for failing to recognise the government's historical role as the excluding agent causing inequalities between Māori and non-Māori.

== Outcomes ==
Six months after the Labour-led Government was formed in late 1999, the term "Closing the Gaps" was no longer used in official documents. Opposition politicians observed that the Government still had a Closing the Gaps policy objective, but no longer referred to the policy by that name. Closing the Gaps was re-branded by the Government as "reducing inequalities", in an attempt to make the policy more popular with the public.

Over the term of the 1999–2008 Labour Government, social statistics for Maori and Pacific Islanders did generally improve; however, the statistics for Pakeha New Zealanders showed a greater improvement, resulting in the 'gaps' actually increasing. Closing the Gaps failed to reduce socio-economic inequalities between Māori and non-Māori and did not resolve structural inequalities that socio-economically excluded Māori from mainstream society.

After losing the 2002 election in a landslide, the opposition National Party campaigned, unsuccessfully, on a commitment to abolish Closing the Gaps and related affirmative action. In 2004 National leader Don Brash suggested all policies helping Māori become less disadvantaged should be abandoned, calling for abolition of the Māori electorates and Māori claims to customary title under the Treaty of Waitangi. Brash's tactic was to claim erroneously that Māori were being afforded privileges that disadvantaged Pākehā. Closing the Gaps popularised a rhetoric of privilege in response to Treaty rights.

== See also ==
- Closing the gap – a similar Australian strategy
