= Climate Change Response (Emissions Trading) Amendment Act 2008 =

Act of Parliament in New Zealand

The Climate Change Response (Emissions Trading) Amendment Act 2008

New Zealand Parliament
- Royal assent: 25 September 2008

Keywords
- climate change mitigation

The Climate Change Response (Emissions Trading) Amendment Act 2008 was a statute enacted in September 2008 by the Fifth Labour Government of New Zealand that established the first version of the New Zealand Emissions Trading Scheme, a national all-sectors all-greenhouse gases uncapped and highly internationally linked emissions trading scheme. After the New Zealand general election, 2008, the incoming National-led government announced that a Parliamentary committee would review the New Zealand emissions trading scheme and recommend changes. Significant amendments were enacted in November 2009. Obligations for pastoral agriculture were further delayed. Obligations for energy and industry were halved via a "two for one" deal. Free allocation of units to industry was made uncapped and output based and with a slower phase-out. A price cap of $25 NZD per tonne was introduced.

== Legislative history 2007–2008 ==
On 20 September 2007, after consulting on policy options for climate change and energy, the Labour-led Government announced that it intended to establish an emissions trading scheme to respond to climate change. Prime Minister Helen Clark stated: "The Government believes that an emissions trading scheme which puts a price on emissions creates the right incentives across the economy to use fuel and energy more efficiently".

On 4 December 2007, the Labour Government introduced the Climate Change (Emissions Trading and Renewable Preference) Bill into Parliament. The bill amended the Climate Change Response Act 2002 by inserting an emissions trading scheme including all sectors of the economy and all greenhouse gases. The bill also restricted the commissioning of any new fossil-fuelled thermal power stations for 10 years.

On 9 September 2008, the sections of the Climate Change (Emissions Trading and Renewable Preference) Bill establishing the NZ ETS were separated into the Climate Change Response (Emissions Trading) Amendment bill.

On 10 September 2008, the Climate Change Response (Emissions Trading) Amendment Act 2008 had its third reading in Parliament and was adopted 63 votes to 57 with support from the Green Party and New Zealand First. The Climate Change Response (Emissions Trading) Amendment Act 2008 received the royal assent on 25 September 2008.

== Summary of Labour NZ ETS ==
The proposed scheme was to cover all six greenhouse gases specified in the Kyoto Protocol, carbon dioxide (CO_{2}), methane (CH_{4}), nitrous oxide (N_{2}O), hydrofluorocarbons (HFCs), perfluorocarbons (PFCs), sulphur hexafluoride (SF_{6}). It would be economy-wide, covering all sectors including agriculture. 'Participants' who must account for their emissions will be few and high in the production chain of each sector and will have to surrender one New Zealand unit (NZU) or one internationally tradable Kyoto-compliant unit for each tonne of emissions.

New Zealand emission units would have been capped in number and distributed to participants either by grand-parenting (gifting) or auctioning. Sectors would enter the NZ ETS at staggered dates, from January 2008 (forestry) through until January 2013 (agriculture), and have differing allocations of free New Zealand units. In general, participants who can pass on costs of the ETS, such as fuel companies to motorists, would not be allocated free units. While participants whose produce is priced internationally, such as dairy exporters, would be allocated a level of free units.

== Lack of a cap ==
In 2007, the Ministry for the Environment acknowledged that the NZ ETS would not have a binding, absolute limit on the total level of emissions allowed in New Zealand. While the quantity of NZ Units gifted to eligible emitters would be fixed, the quantity of international 'Kyoto-compliant' units that could be brought in to match emissions would not be limited. Unlike most other emissions trading schemes the NZ ETS has no limit on the volume of international emissions units (CERs and ERUs) that may be imported. Consequently, there is no cap or limit on the volume of emissions permitted in New Zealand provided that emissions units are imported into the country and surrendered.

Ministry for the Environment Fact Sheet 16 stated: "There is no cap on the emissions that occur within New Zealand". However, the Ministry for the Environment still regarded the NZ ETS as operating within the cap on emissions established by the Kyoto Protocol for the first commitment period of 2008–2012. Moyes (2008) describes this as a "flexible cap" where New Zealand sourced emissions regulated by the NZETS are constrained only by the international market price for GHG emissions.

Greenpeace noted that the proposed NZ ETS placed no limit on the number of permits that could be imported into New Zealand and it did not include a domestic emission reduction target. Greenpeace considered that in operation the NZ ETS would be a carbon tax with the rate set by the world market price. Bertram and Terry (2008, p35) concluded that the NZ ETS is not a cap-and-trade scheme as described in the economics literature because it does not place a cap on New Zealand's emissions of greenhouse gases.

== Units of trade and international linkage ==
The 2008 NZ ETS created a new emission unit, the New Zealand Unit (NZU), which the Ministry for the Environment described as being the 'primary domestic unit of trade'. The NZU is equivalent to one tonne of greenhouse gases in a one-year compliance period. The NZU is 'backed' by an assigned amount unit. It is the NZUs that will be allocated by 'grandfathering" to forestry, industry, energy, fishing and agriculture under an allocation plan.

As noted in the previous paragraph, participants in the NZ ETS could also use most of the 'Kyoto Units' to meet their surrender obligations. The permitted units were: Assigned amount units (AAUs), Emission Reduction Units (ERUs), Removal Units (RMUs), and Certified Emission Reductions (CERs). However, temporary CERs and iCERS cannot be used, and neither can CERs and ERUs generated from nuclear projects. Consequently, compared to other emissions trading schemes, the NZ ETS is highly linked to the international markets and will be a price-taker.

The Sustainability Council called for the existing international emission units established under the Kyoto protocol to be used instead of the New Zealand Units.

== Allocation of emission units ==
Under the Labour Government's initial proposal, allocation of NZUs would have been by a mix of auctioning and "grandfathering" (free allocation to existing emitters based on historic emissions). Forestry, transport, energy and industry would have had to obtain units by auction. Industries defined as 'trade-exposed' would have received a free allocation of 90% of their 2005 emissions. Agriculture would have received an allocation of units equivalent to 90% of 2005 emissions.

In the final version as set out in the Climate Change Response (Emissions Trading) Amendment Act 2008, forest owners with pre-1990 forests were to receive a fixed one-off free allocation of units. Transport (Liquid fossil fuels), stationary energy and industrial processes would not receive any free allocation of units.

Trade-exposed industry & energy would receive a free allocation of 90% of 2005 emissions annually to 2018. From 2019 to 2029 the free allocation would phase out at the rate of a 1/12 (8.3%) reduction each year. Agriculture would receive a free allocation of 90% of 2005 emissions each year to 2018. From 2019 to 2029 the free allocation would phase out at the rate of a 1/12 (8.3%) reduction each year. Fishing would receive a free allocation of 50% of 2005 emissions each year from July 2010 to January 2013.

== Effectiveness of price incentive for emission reduction ==
Professor Jonathan Boston, Director of the Institute of Policy Studies (New Zealand) at Victoria University of Wellington, commented that the 2008 NZ ETS will be less effective in reducing emissions because of political compromises such as the delayed sector entry dates and the extended period of free allocation of emissions units.

Dr Suzi Kerr, an economist and Senior Fellow at Motu Economic and Public Policy Research, commented that the NZ ETS would be costly to tax payers as it provided for very high levels of free allocation of emission units to emitters.

In August 2007, Infometrics economist Adolf Stroombergen wrote an opinion article about permit auctions and free allocation for the Dominion Post. Stroombergen noted that giving permits to emitters instead of selling them in an auction had very different wealth distribution effects, with major emitters the biggest beneficiaries. So he asked why allocate and not auction? One reason is to compensate firms for 'stranded' assets that have less value due to emissions trading. In that case the compensation should only be the loss in asset value. Stroombergen considered New Zealand was only likely to have a few 'stranded' assets. The second reason is to compensate firms who may be at competitive disadvantage with overseas firms whose emissions are without a carbon price. Stroombergen considered that only basic commodities competing entirely on price would face this competitive risk, and that he would expect to see most permits auctioned, not given away as there is no economic basis for ongoing free allocation of permits.

In May 2008, Chris Schilling, an economist at the New Zealand Institute of Economic Research (NZIER), argued that free allocation of emissions units to 'at-risk' firms competing in export markets was necessary to maintain their competitiveness. Schilling also argued that the assumption that allocation is a transfer of wealth from households to industry may also be incorrect. This is based on NZIER modelling which suggests that because allocation protects the competitiveness of New Zealand firms, it reduces the economic impact of the ETS. So the cost of allocation needs to be measured against the cost of not giving allocation. Finally Schilling states that allocation is needed to maintain the environmental integrity of the scheme. Allocation to efficient New Zealand firms reduces the risk that emissions will 'leak' offshore. Reducing the output of New Zealand firms, it is argued, will result in increased production in another nation, and perhaps a net increase in global emissions.

Economist Geoff Bertram compared the price incentives of the 2008 NZ ETS with a carbon or greenhouse gas tax for Kyoto commitment period 1, 2008 to 2012. A tax of $NZ30 per tonne, on the 386 million tonnes of emitted greenhouse gases likely to be emitted from 2008 to 2012, would give a price signal (or government revenue) of $NZ11.6 billion. The exemptions and subsidies in Labour's ETS would have reduced that to about $NZ1 billion. In terms of the obligation to surrender emissions permits, Labour's ETS would have reduced the gross hypothetical surrender obligation of 386 million credits (one for each tonne) for the five years down to 35 million credits.

== Sector entry dates ==
In the Climate Change Response (Emissions Trading) Amendment Act 2008, the sector entry dates were;

- 1 January 2008 : Forestry
- 1 January 2010 : Stationary energy, Industrial processes, Trade-exposed Industry & Energy, Fishing
- 1 January 2011 : Transport (Liquid fossil fuels):
- 1 January 2013 : Agriculture:

== Reactions ==
In September 2008, National Party climate change spokesman Nick Smith described the NZ ETS as 'rushed', 'flawed' and 'riddled with errors'.

Business New Zealand Chief Executive Phil O’Reilly described the legislation as "deficient","a risk to our economy" and an "example of poor law-making".

The Sustainability Council stated that farmers and big industries were being heavily exempted through gifted allocations of New Zealand Units which were effectively off-balance sheet subsidies.

Jeanette Fitzsimons, the Co-Leader of the Green Party said that she thought the NZ ETS was a 'first step' and that New Zealanders should avoid thinking that the NZ ETS 'fixed' climate change. The Greens co-leader Russel Norman questioned the fact that agriculture would not enter the NZ ETS until 2013 and that the delay represented a $1.2 billion subsidy for the dairy industry. Norman said that existing technology allowed farmers to reduce emissions, and the agriculture sector should join the NZ ETS on the same timetable as fuel companies – in 2009, rather than 2013.

Greenpeace Aotearoa described the 2008 NZ ETS as "weakened and watered down" and too generous to agriculture and other big polluters. Greenpeace considered that the NZ ETS would not drive the deep emission cuts needed to prevent global warming. Spokesperson Simon Boxer said: "This is very much a case of something being better than nothing."

To express opposition to the NZ ETS, the ACT Party put on a piece of street theatre where a "witch" whipped a "farmer" who was dragging an oversized cheque made out to Russia for $NZ 5 billion from the New Zealand taxpayer.

During the development of the scheme, John Stephenson of NZIER commented that the Government should "Take a breath and have a cup of tea" before proceeding. In Stephenson's opinion the negative effect of ETS on economic growth was too great. NZIER economic modeling was reported to have shown the Labour ETS would take $3000 off individual household spending annually and cost 20,000 jobs. The modelling also showed that the Labour ETS would reduce the value of dairy land by 40 per cent and reduce dairy exports by 13 per cent.

In April 2009, the Sustainable Energy Forum described the NZ ETS as an "almost completely ineffective means of reducing New Zealand's gross greenhouse gas emissions".

== See also ==
- Climate change in New Zealand
- Energy in New Zealand
- List of climate change initiatives
