= New Zealand environmental law =

Environmental law in New Zealand is an increasingly well defined body of national law that has a specialist court, The Environment Court of New Zealand (Māori: Te Kooti Taiao o Aotearoa), to decide related issues.

== History ==
The roots of New Zealand environmental law can be traced to the common law of Australia. The increasing environmental awareness of the 1960s led to a specific body of environmental law that developed in many Western countries including New Zealand. Environmental law became more integrated in the 1980s with the passing of the Environment Act 1986 and the Conservation Act 1987. These Acts set up the Ministry for the Environment, Parliamentary Commissioner for the Environment and the Department of Conservation.

The most significant Act of Parliament concerning environmental law was the passing of Resource Management Act 1991. Issues under the Act are adjudicated by the Environment Court of New Zealand.

== Timeline ==
This timeline outlines the more significant environmental legislation in New Zealand:

- 1903 - Scenery Preservation Act
- 1962 - Nature Conservation Council set up under the Nature Conservation Council Act.
- August 1970 - New Zealand Cabinet established the Environmental Council
- February 1972 - Cabinet established the position of Minister of the Environment
- August 1972 - Government creates the New Zealand Commission for the Environment
- April 1973 - The Clean Air Act 1972 comes into force.
- March 1974 - Environmental Protection and Enhancement Procedures (EP&EP) are instituted.
- January 1987 - Environment Act 1986 comes into force.
- April 1987 - Conservation Act comes into force.
- October 1991 - Resource Management Act comes into force.
- June 1996 - Hazardous Substances and New Organisms Act

== See also ==
- Timeline of the New Zealand environment
- New Zealand Nuclear Free Zone, Disarmament, and Arms Control Act 1987
