= Holidays Act 2003 =

Legislation in New Zealand

- Royal assent: 17 December 2003
- Commenced: 1 April 2004
- Status: Current legislation

The Holidays Act 2003 is an Act of Parliament in New Zealand that regulates public holidays. It was amended by the Holidays (Transfer of Public Holidays) Amendment Act 2008 and the Holidays Amendment Act 2010. This page includes those changes.

However, in 2016 MBIE found problems with underpayments on holiday pay due to the complex act, and new legislation is now not expected to be introduced until 2024.

== Principles underpinning the Holidays Act ==
New Zealand law on holidays and leave has been based on three key concepts:

1. For the purposes of rest and recreation, all employees are entitled to enjoy four weeks' paid annual holidays (or "annual leave") each year.
2. Public holidays are for the observance of days of national, religious, or cultural significance, which all employees should be entitled to take as leave, where possible. Where it is necessary for an employee to work on a public holiday that work should be specially rewarded.
3. The employment relationship is both financial and human. Therefore, after a period of employment, it is reasonable to expect that employers will support employees with sick leave and bereavement leave when required.

The Holidays Act 2003 reinforces these principles by attempting to balance fairness between employers and employees, and recognising that, in some areas, existing arrangements may meet these principles.

== Public Holidays ==
After the introduction of the Employment Contracts Act in 1991, some workers in New Zealand without strong union representation lost either their right to have a day paid off on a public holiday or a day in lieu. Furthermore, if they did work a public holiday, a lot of employees lost any right for a day in lieu or penal rates for working these holidays.

This Act makes it compulsory for all employers to give their permanent employees either a paid day off work, or a day in lieu on all public holidays. Also, if the employer requires an employee to work on a public holiday, the Act requires the employee to not only get a paid day in lieu, but to also be paid at the rate of time and a half for working that day.

== Annual Holidays ==
As stated above, the Act increased the annual leave for an employee from 3 weeks, to 4 weeks. However the Act delayed the implementation of this section until 1 April 2007.

== Sick Leave ==
The Act states that an employee does not need to supply a medical certificate if the employee is away from work for 3 calendar days or less. This removes any unfairness in requiring an employee to supply a costly medical certificate when taking a short time off work. However, the Act states 3 calendar days, and not work days, so even taking just 2 days off work surrounding a weekend (e.g. Thursday-Friday, Friday-Monday or Monday-Tuesday) including statutory holidays, technically would require a medical certificate. Furthermore, the Act was later amended that an employer can still request a medical certificate if they have reasonable grounds the employee is not sick, and that the employer agrees to reimburse the employee for the cost of obtaining the medical certificate.

The Holidays Act describes sick leave entitlement in days and does not provide for smaller units. If an employee works part of a day and then takes the remainder of the day off as sick leave, then the whole day is counted as sick leave. Despite this, and employer and employee may agree to use hours or part days, as long as the employee is better off as a result.

== Sick Leave and Holiday pay rate ==
The Act also rectified employers underpaying employees for sick days and holidays, particularly in jobs where part of the employee's pay was bonus or performance pay. For instance, if an employee got paid $100 a day, plus $200 a day bonus, the employer could have paid the employee $100 for a sick day, and not $300 as they would have expected of earned for that day. The Act now requires an employee to be paid what they would have expected to earn had they worked that day. Typically, this is calculated to the person's average daily pay for the last 12 months.

However the Act can be unfair in several circumstances. A common example is where an employee, having worked a five-day week, is also paid to be on standby during the weekend. In this case their Average Daily Pay will be significantly lower than if the employee was not paid to be on standby. This is because the standby allowance is typically small (a small increase in the numerator), but the number of workdays increases significantly as a result of weekends being included (a large increase in the denominator).

It is not always clear whether an employer should pay Relevant Daily Pay or Average Daily Pay when an employee takes sick leave. The decision can make a major difference to an employee's pay. In 2012 New Zealand Post was found to have incorrectly paid employees Relevant Daily Pay based on their staff's rostered hours, rather than Average Daily Pay, which also takes into account occasional unrostered overtime that an employee might have worked, had they not been absent. This resulted in NZ Post making back payments to staff of nearly $12 million.

Payroll software typically calculates payments for employees on the basis of an hourly rate and the number of hours worked. The fact that the Holidays Act specifies daily rates for some leave types (as above) and weekly rates for annual leave makes calculations for leave payments problematic and error prone, especially for employees who work an irregular number of hours each day. The law firm Simpson Grierson, is leading a working group that is striving for changes to make the Holidays Act simpler to apply.

== Proposed changes ==
In 2016 a team in MBIEs Labour Inspectorate was formed to monitor problems with non-compliance with the "baffling" act. The Labour government set up a tripartite task force in May 2018 to review the Act, with a view to simplify it. The Taskforce issued an interim report in December 2018, then made 22 final recommendations in October 2019, which were accepted by the government in February 2021 but have not yet been enacted by changes in law. One of the recommendations is the ability for employees to take holidays in advance on a pro rata basis, referenced to the length of service. Another is changes to reflect transparency and lessen any disadvantage to employees who are affected by close downs.

The government expected to introduce legislation based on the recommendations into parliament in early 2022, but has since indicated that no changes will be made until after general elections in November 2023.
