= Rod Oram =

New Zealand journalist (1950–2024)

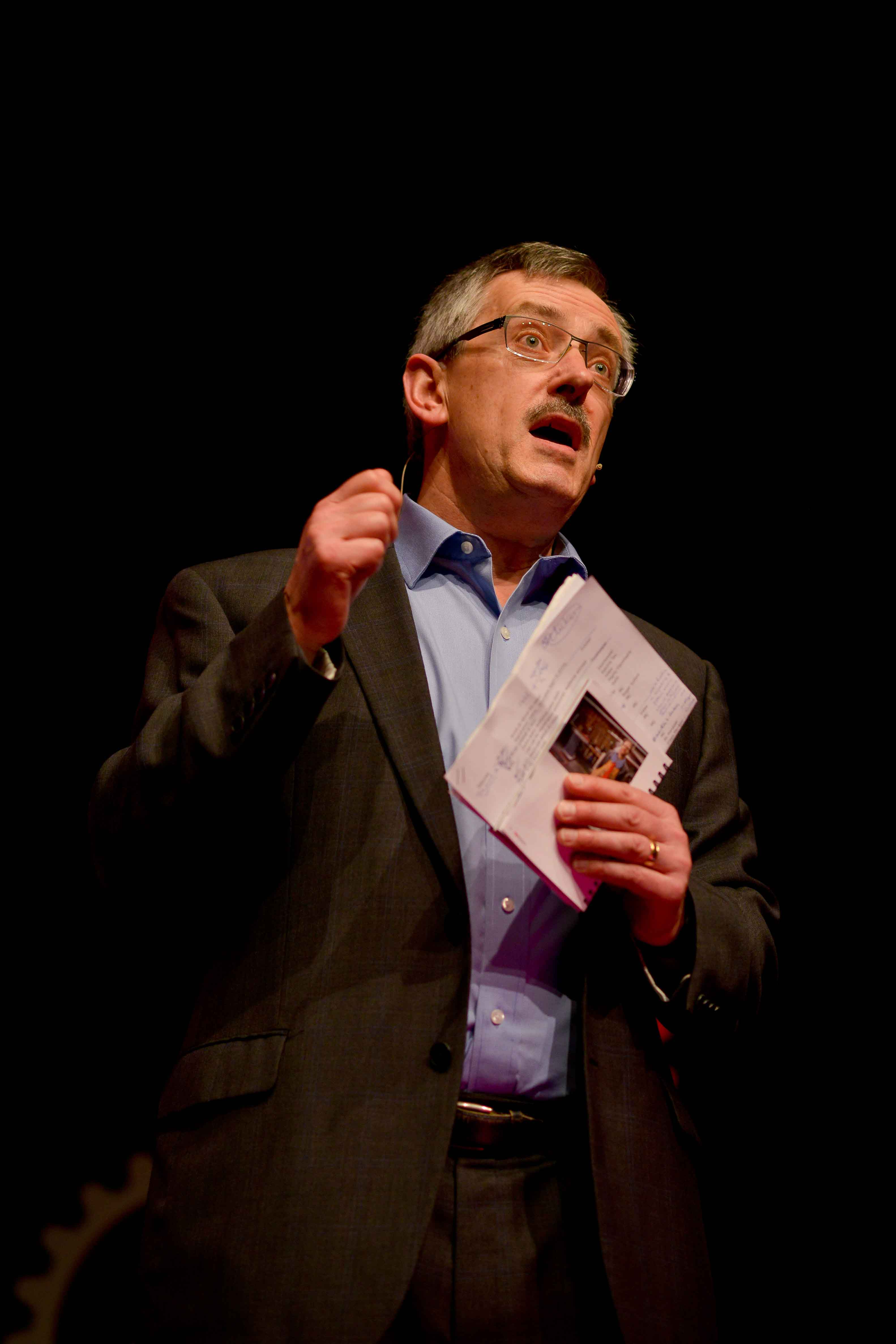
- Oram speaking in 2012
- Born: Roderick Sinclair Ashwood Oram; 3 November 1950; Birmingham, England
- Died: 19 March 2024 (aged 73); Auckland, New Zealand
- Occupation: Journalist

Roderick Sinclair Ashwood Oram (3 November 1950 – 19 March 2024) was a New Zealand journalist writing on corporate, economic, and political issues. He was a columnist for The Sunday Star-Times, a regular broadcaster on radio and television and a frequent public speaker. He was an adjunct professor in the business school at Unitec Institute of Technology in Auckland, and he contributed to several regional economic development projects.

== Biography ==
Oram was born in Birmingham, England. He spent 20 years as an international financial journalist in Europe and North America, and travelled extensively in those continents and in Asia. From 1975 to 1979, Oram held various journalist positions in Canada, and from 1979 to 1997 he held a variety of posts at the Financial Times, London and New York City.

In 1997, Oram and his family emigrated to New Zealand, where he was editor of the Business Herald section of The New Zealand Herald from 1997 to 2000. Oram was a triple award-winner at the 2004 Qantas Media Awards: as business columnist of the year, business feature writer of the year and winner of the NZTE travel scholarship for his writing on innovation in New Zealand.

In the 2006 Westpac Business & Financial Journalism Awards, Oram won the Reporting on Corporate Responsibility, Sustainability or Community Engagement category.

Penguin published Oram's book about the New Zealand economy, Reinventing Paradise, in August 2007.

In August 2016, Oram's book Three Cities: Seeking Hope in the Anthropocene was published by Bridget Williams Books.

Oram died in Auckland on 19 March 2024 after having a heart attack while cycling. He was 73.
