= Taueki v R =

- Court: Supreme Court of New Zealand
- Full case name: Philip Dean Taueki v The Queen
- Decided: 17 December 2013
- Citation: [2013] NZSC 146
- Transcript: Available here

Case history
- Prior action: District Court DC Palmerston North CRI-2010-031-0051588, 11 May 2011; Court of Appeal [2012] NZCA 428, [2012] 3 NZLR 601

Court membership
- Judges sitting: Elias CJ, McGrath, William Young, Chambers, and Susan Glazebrook JJ

Keywords
- Lake Horowhenua, Crimes Act 1961, Defence of property, Peaceable possession

Taueki v R [2013] NZSC 146 is a decision of the Supreme Court of New Zealand concerning the defence of property under section 56 of the Crimes Act 1961, including the requirements of "possession" and "peaceable possession" as prerequisites for the lawful use of reasonable force to prevent trespass. The case arose from a physical altercation at Lake Horowhenua in the Horowhenua region, in which Philip Dean Taueki, a member of the Muaūpoko tribe and beneficial owner of the lake, used force against a member of the Horowhenua Sailing Club who was preparing to launch a motorboat onto the lake in alleged breach of the lake’s bylaws. Taueki was convicted of assault in the District Court, and his appeal was dismissed by the Court of Appeal before he appealed to the Supreme Court.

The Supreme Court unanimously dismissed the appeal in a judgment delivered by McGrath J. The Court held that “peaceable possession” within the meaning of section 56 refers to possession obtained and maintained other than in the context of an immediate or ongoing dispute – that is, possession existing prior to the use of force sought to be justified. The Court further held that possession requires actual control over the property in question, assessed as a matter of fact having regard to all the circumstances. On the facts, Taueki was found not to be in possession of the area in front of the clubhouse where the assault took place, as that area was a public domain actively occupied and used by the sailing club, and Taueki had not exercised sufficient control over it. The Court additionally held that reasonable force under section 56 ordinarily requires prior notice to the alleged trespasser and a reasonable opportunity to leave, and that the defence cannot be relied upon on the basis of a mistaken belief as to possession or trespass.

== Lake Horowhenua dispute ==
Lake Horowhenua is in the Horowhenua region, next to the town of Levin. The Maori tribe Muaupoko own the land surrounding the lake and the lake bed through a trust. For Muaupoko the lake is of central importance, and three hundred of their ancestors are buried under the lake bed. Due to years of pollution it is one of the most polluted lakes in New Zealand, with water quality so bad that ingesting it could potentially kill a small child. There is also a grievance over the use of motorboats on the lake, as the New Zealand Listener described:

Since the 1950s, the lake owners have raised objections to motor-powered boats because of the noise, the risk of pollution and the churning up of the water under which their ancestors lie. Accordingly, power boats are allowed on the lake only in specific circumstances and with express approval from the board – a requirement flouted for so long, according to Taueki, that many club members are not even aware of it.

Since 2004, Philip Taueki, a member of Muaupoko tribe and a former accountant has lived in a building on land next to the lake campaigning against the continued degradation of the lake. This has brought to Taueki into conflict with the rowing and sailing clubs who use the lake over the use of motorboats on the lake. As a member of Mauapoko, Taueki is a beneficial owner of the lake and the domain surrounding it. Taueki had also been given "authority of the Trust to ensure that the bylaws were complied with and, in particular, that boats going on the lake were washed down and did not cause further contamination".

== Assault on Sailing Club members ==
On 14 September 2008, Taueki drove up to the Horowhenua Sailing Club building and got out of his car before shouting at club members about to launch a motorboat into the lake. Taueki was attempting to tell the Club members not to take the boat onto the lake. In the course of this heated discussion with club members, Taueki pulled a club member off the motorboat, "by grabbing his clothing around the chest and neck area", as the boat sat on its trailer about to be launched. As a result of this altercation Taueki was charged with the assault with which this appeal is concerned. Two further charges of assault were laid in relation to a continuing physical conflict with club members.

== Legal background ==
The status of the land where the dispute took place is complex. Although Muaupoko continued to own the lake and most of its surroundings, the Reserves and Domains Act 1953 had declared that some Muaupoko owned land and the lake's surface to be in the public domain, managed and controlled by a Domain Board. As such the assault took place on land which was owned by the Muaupoko trust but vested within the public domain.

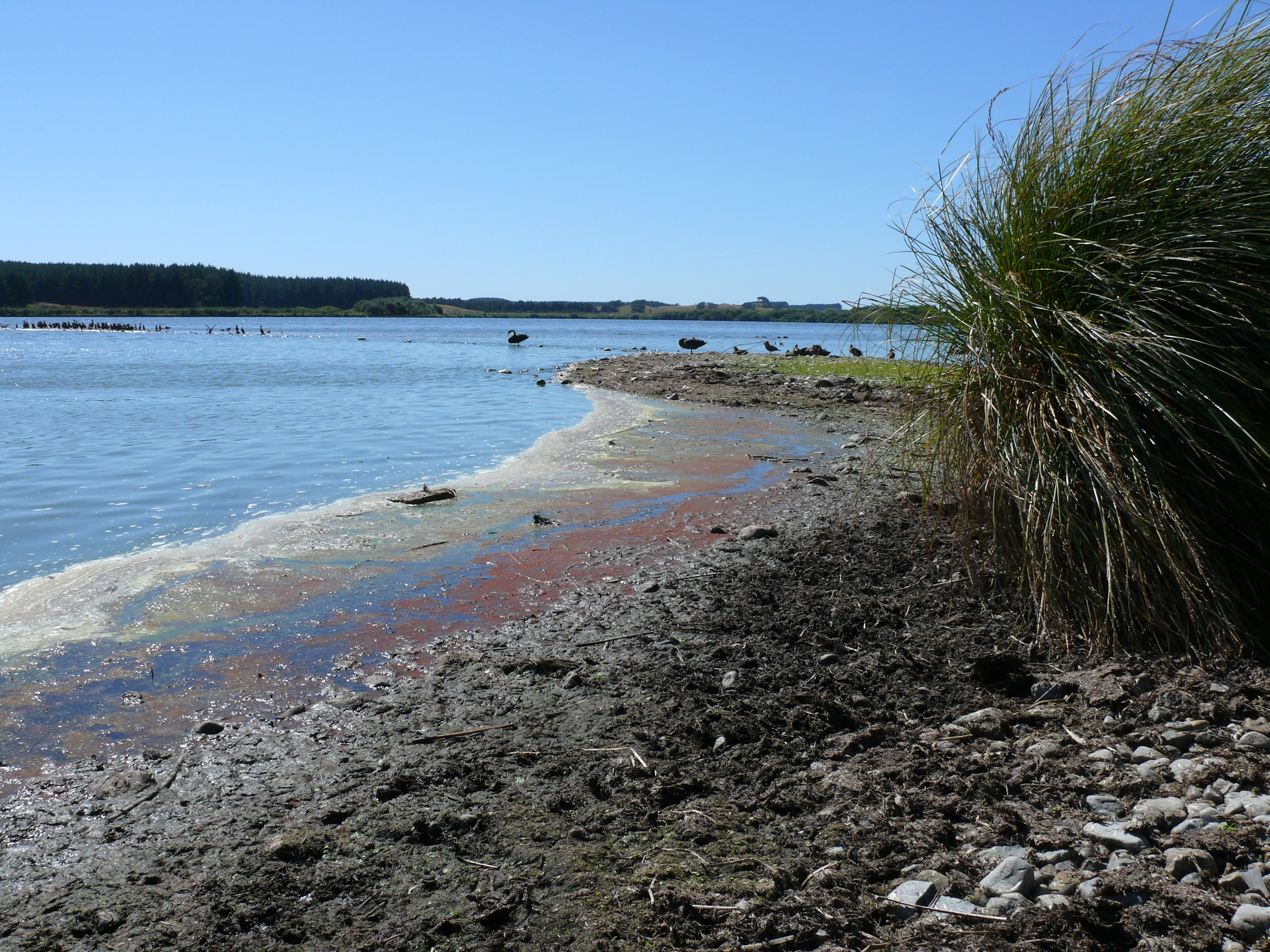
The shore of Lake Horowhenua.

At trial in the District Court, Taueki attempted to use section 56 of the Crimes Act 1961 to justify his assault on the club member in the boat:

s 56 Defence of land or building (1) Every one in peaceable possession of any land or building, and every one lawfully assisting him or acting by his authority, is justified in using reasonable force to prevent any person from trespassing on the land or building or to remove him therefrom, if he does not strike or do bodily harm to that person.

Taueki was convicted of assault in the District Court and had his appeal dismissed in the Court of Appeal. He appealed to the Supreme Court.

== Judgment ==
Justice McGrath delivered the unanimous judgment of the Court dismissing Taueki's appeal. The Supreme Court clarified the meaning of possession and peaceable possession in the context of the defence of property. On possession, they held:

Possession, as required by s 56, accordingly turns on whether the person raising the defence has actual control over the property in question. Whether a person has sufficient control to be in possession is a factual question turning on all the circumstances including, for example, the nature of the land in question and the manner in which it is usually enjoyed.

On the definition of peaceable possession they ruled that:

Overall, the meaning of "peaceable possession" which best fits the context of the Crimes Act is simply possession that has been achieved other than in the context of an immediate or ongoing dispute. In brief, it is possession obtained and maintained before the employment of the physical force the use of which the person seeks to justify.

In determining whether Taueki was in peaceable possession the Court held:

But we are satisfied that Mr Taueki was not in possession of that area as required by s 56. While the Reserves and Other Lands Disposal Act reserved to the Maori owners, of whom Mr Taueki was one, the "free and unrestricted use" of the lake and domain, this right of access to the lake and land does not confer any control over, or amount to possession of, the same especially given the nature of the land as a public domain. Nor is there any evidence that Mr Taueki had asserted or was exercising any actual control over the part of the domain in front of the clubhouse. He was not occupying the area where the incident occurred nor using it for his own purposes. On the other hand, the Club was actively occupying the area for its own purposes. On these facts, Mr Taueki did not have actual control. Given that Mr Taueki was not in possession of the land where the assault took place, the issue of "peaceable" possession does not squarely arise.

The Court also held that in order for force to be reasonable, the person using it will normally need to have given a trespasser notice that they are trespassing and a reasonable opportunity to leave. In addition, the Court held that a defendant could not rely on a mistaken belief as to whether they were in peaceable possession of the land or whether the other party was trespassing.
