= Noel Anderson =

New Zealand judge (1944–2021)

The Honourable Sir Noel Anderson KNZM QC

President of the Court of Appeal
- In office 2004–2006
- Preceded by: Sir Thomas Gault
- Succeeded by: Sir William Young

Personal details
- Born: 3 January 1944 Auckland, New Zealand
- Died: 6 October 2021 (aged 77)

Sir Noel Crossley Anderson KNZM QC (3 January 1944 – 6 October 2021) was a New Zealand judge who was President of the Court of Appeal of New Zealand from 2004 to 2006, before being elevated to the Supreme Court. He left office in 2008.

== Career ==
Anderson was born in January 1944 in Auckland. He graduated with an LL.B. from the University of Auckland in 1967 and was a partner in the Auckland firm Martelli, McKegg & Adams-Smith until commencing practice solely as a barrister in 1972. He had his first case the same day he was admitted to the bar in 1967 against John Henry, future Court of Appeal judge and Privy Councillor.

He was appointed a Queen's Counsel in May 1986, to the High Court in May 1987 and presided for four years in Hamilton before becoming a resident judge in Auckland for 10 years. Justice Anderson presided over hundreds of cases, including the third Plumley-Walker murder trial, the trial of Malcolm Rewa for murder, as well sitting on the inquiries into abortion, contraception and sterilisation, and the Mt Erebus disaster.

Justice Anderson became senior judge in Auckland in 1997 before being appointed executive judge in August 2000. In a survey done on the assignment of cases to judges between January 1999 and July 2001 in the High Court, Justice Anderson was one of the judges who heard the predominant number of Bill of Rights cases. Justice Anderson was appointed to the Court of Appeal in 2001 and the Supreme Court in February 2006. He also acted as the Administrator of the New Zealand Government during Governor-General Dame Silvia Cartwright's absence from the country in May 2005.

Although Anderson retired as a Supreme Court Justice in 2008, he continued to sit when needed. He also served on the Investment Committee for the Tūhoe Establishment Trust, which manages Treaty of Waitangi settlements for the Ngāi Tūhoe iwi.

Anderson died on 6 October 2021.

=== Position on barristerial immunity ===
In Lai v Chamberlains, Justice Anderson delivered a lone dissenting judgement for retention of barristerial immunity on a five-judge Appeal Court panel. Anderson claimed keeping lawyers immune from accountability to their clients was necessary for the proper administration of justice, as lawyers owe their primary obligation to the Court and it was argued this may at times conflict with the lawyers obligation to their clients. Justices Hammond, Glazebrook, O'Regan and McGrath disagreed.

== Honours ==
Anderson was awarded the New Zealand 1990 Commemoration Medal. In the 2004 Queen's Birthday Honours, he was appointed a Distinguished Companion of the New Zealand Order of Merit, for services to the judiciary. In 2009, following the reinstatement of titular honours by the New Zealand government, Anderson accepted redesignation as a Knight Companion of the New Zealand Order of Merit.
