= Paki v Attorney-General (No 2) =

New Zealand Supreme Court judgment

- Court: Supreme Court of New Zealand
- Full case name: John Hanita Paki & Ors v Attorney-General of New Zealand for and on behalf of the Crown
- Decided: 29 August 2014
- Citation: [2014] NZSC 118, [2015] 1 NZLR 67
- Transcript: Available here

Case history
- Prior actions: High Court [2013] [2009] 1 NZLR 72; Court of Appeal [2009] NZCA 584, [2011] 1 NZLR 125; Supreme Court [2010] NZSC 88 and [2012] NZSC 50

Court membership
- Judges sitting: Elias CJ, McGrath, Young and Glazebrook JJ. Chambers J died before judgment.

Keywords
- Treaty of Waitangi, Constitutional law, ad medium filum

Paki v Attorney-General (No 2) was a case in the Supreme Court of New Zealand that considered whether “usque ad medium filum aquae”, the common law presumption that the purchaser of land adjoining a stream or river also obtains ownership of the waterway to its mid-point applied to the Waikato riverbed adjoining blocks of land at Pouakani, near Mangakino. For differing reasons the Supreme Court unanimously held that the "mid-point presumption" did not apply and "decided that it had not been shown that title determination to the Pouakani land blocks had affected ownership of the riverbed".

The decision has been described as "explosive" because it could lead to a flood of litigation concerning ownership of riverbeds, and because the stretch of river the case was concerned with contains three hydroelectric dams owned by Mighty River Power: Arapuni, Maraetai and Whakamaru.

== Background ==
Initially the appellants had sought customary ownership of the riverbed in the Maori Land Court. But the claim was blocked by the 1962 Court of Appeal decision, Re the Bed of the Wanganui River [1962] NZLR 600 which, "assumed that ownership of the riverbed had been determined, and customary rights extinguished, when ownership of the neighbouring riverbank was investigated by the Native Land Court. This earlier precedent also assumed that the common law presumption of ad medium filum aquae applied."

In consequence the appellants went to the High Court seeking relief for breach of fiduciary duties. The appellants claimed on behalf of descendants of members of hapu who had been awarded interests in land adjoining the Waikato River by the Native Land Court in the late 19th century. According to Chief Justice Sian Elias's summary; "The appellants asserted in the High Court that the vesting of Pouakani No 1 and the Crown acquisitions of the other riparian blocks gave the Crown ownership of the bed of the river to the middle of the flow (“usque ad medium filum aquae”), by operation of a conveyancing presumption of English common law."

The appellants claim was that Maori vendors could not have understood this concept and as such the Crown had breached "fiduciary or equitable duties of disclosure and fair dealing". Consequently, the appellants sought a declaration in the High Court that the Crown, to the extent it had ownership of the Waikato riverbed, it held it as a constructive trustee for the descendants of the original owners.

The Crown's case was firstly, that the riverbed of the navigable parts of the river were vested in it by the Coal-mines Act Amendment Act 1903 and subsequent statutory provisions. Secondly, they argued by the principle of ad medium filum they had acquired title of the non-navigable parts of the river and denied any breach of equitable or fiduciary duties. Finally, the Crown argued that the passage of time barred the appellants case.

The appellants failed in the High Court and the Court of Appeal on various grounds, with both courts ruling that the Waikato River as a whole was a navigable river. However, in a preliminary decision in 2012 (Paki v Attorney-General (No 1)) the Supreme Court ruled that the Waikato River was not navigable in the stretch of river in contention, making the Crown's first argument redundant. As such the Supreme Court was forced to rule on four points of law in this case, the most important of which was, "[D]id the Crown acquire title to the claimed part of the riverbed through application of the presumption of riparian ownership ad medium filum aquae by reason of its acquisition of the riparian lands?"

== Judgments ==
The Supreme Court decided that whether the presumption of "ad medium filum" attached to the transfer of titles associated with the Pouakani block was a question of fact to be decided by the Maori Land Court and as such dismissed the appeal.

=== Elias CJ ===
Elias CJ noted that under the Native Rights Act 1865 and subsequent statutes, "title to or interest in land in which native title has not been extinguished is “determined according to the Ancient Custom and Usage of the Maori people so far as the same can be ascertained”." Elias CJ also stated that, "Rebuttal of the presumption is not the first question. The prior question is whether it is shown that the riparian owners whose titles were investigated by the Native Land Court had themselves the property in the riverbed upon which the presumption depends."

In conclusion, Elias CJ held, "Whether the Crown became the owner of the riverbed adjacent to the Pouakani lands on purchase of the interests of the Pouakani riparian owners depends upon whether any customary property in the riverbed was extinguished upon investigation of the riparian lands. It is not established that ownership of the riverbed was vested in the owners to whom the riparian lands were awarded and subsequently passed to the Crown with its purchases. Such ownership to the middle of the flow does not arise by operation of law and could only be established if consistent with Maori custom and usage (a question of fact for investigation)."

=== McGrath J ===
Justice McGrath, in his decision, also rejected the "ad medium filum" presumption;

As I have indicated, the argument for application of the mid-point presumption depends on its consistency with the understanding and intentions of Maori; only if the attendant facts and custom are consistent with its application can it apply. If the mid-point presumption was consistent with Maori custom, that is, in my view, inconsistent with the Crown acquiring title in breach of a fiduciary duty, even if it were established that one was owed. In other words, if there were a fiduciary duty, it could not be breached by the absence of a warning in a situation where the Crown acted in a way consistent with the vendor’s understanding.

[180] On the other hand, if the mid-point presumption was inconsistent with the custom of the Maori vendors, then the Crown could not have acquired title by operation of the presumption and, again, there cannot have been any breach of a fiduciary duty. The principle would not have applied to the Native Land Court titles granted to the riparian owners, so that the vendors would not have had title to the mid-point that could be transferred to the Crown, and customary title to the river may be unextinguished.

In comments regarding how courts should treat claims by Maori that the Crown had breached fiduciary duties, McGrath J expressed caution, " that courts do not frustrate legislative mechanisms or render statutory remedies redundant by developing alternative laws that go beyond the scope of what is available under statute. This is not to say that the courts should not, where circumstances require, consider the need for development of the common law of New Zealand in relation to the reciprocal fiduciary obligations that the Crown and Maori owe to each other. Rather it means that, in cases where they are required to do so, the courts should ensure that the law is not developed in a way that frustrates applicable statutory schemes."

=== William Young J ===
Justice William Young also held that the appellants' claim that Native Land Court titles to riparian blocks included the riverbed to its midpoint was "at least doubtful". However William Young J also held that the appellants could not rely on the rules of equity to have the riverbed placed in a constructive trust or partially rescinded. Furthermore, William Young J held that the appellants' claims were barred by limitation statutes and also the Crown's defence of laches and acquiescence was made out.

=== Glazebrook J ===
Justice Glazebrook also agreed the appeal must fail on the basis that the midpoint presumption did reflect universal Maori custom; and as such, "I am also inclined to agree with the Chief Justice that the issue as to whether the riverbed was owned to the mid-point is to be determined by reference to the custom of the particular region involved. The mid-point presumption is only a presumption and may be displaced. It would likely be displaced if it did not accord with local Maori custom."

== Significance ==
The beginning of a public debate over ownership of riverbeds has begun however it has so far been limited. Professor Richard Boast wrote in the Maori Law Review, "At the time of writing (September 2014) the full implications of these observations were difficult to assess, but certainly seemed to be potentially far-reaching". As Wellington lawyer Tom Bennion wrote of the decision,

"This potentially means that the bed of the Waikato River, and other riverbeds, remain in Māori ownership, despite everyone assuming that they had left Māori ownership many years ago. [...] This debate is similar to the debate over ownership of the foreshore and seabed. The judgment has caused barely a ripple in the news. That is probably because it is complicated, and because its practical implications will take some time to tease out."

Another article on the judgment noted, "The decision casts real doubt on whether the beds of rivers that are culturally important to Maori are included within adjoining riparian titles. It may lead to further claims to unextinguished customary title in riverbeds, and poses challenges for riparian owners who might wish to contest such claims."
