= Mahomed v R =

New Zealand Supreme Court case

- Court: Supreme Court of New Zealand
- Full case name: Tabbasum Mahomed & Azees Mahomed v The Queen
- Decided: 19 May 2011
- Citations: [2011] NZSC 52; [2011] 3 NZLR 145
- Transcript: https://www.courtsofnz.govt.nz/assets/the-courts/supreme-court/case-summaries/case-information-2010/sc-97-117-2010-mahomed-tabbasum-v-r.pdf

Case history
- Prior actions: High Court CRI-2008-092-748; Court of Appeal [2010] NZCA 419

Court membership
- Chief justice: Sian Elias
- Associate justices: Peter Blanchard; Andrew Tipping; John McGrath; William Young

Keywords
- Evidence Act 2006; Similar fact evidence

Mahomed v R [2011] NZSC 52 was a case in the Supreme Court of New Zealand concerning the admissibility of propensity evidence against defendants facing criminal prosecution.

== Facts ==
Tabbasum Mahomed and Azees Mahomed were the mother and father of Tahani, a 10-week-old baby girl who died on 1 January 2008 as "a result of a fracture to the skull at the back of her head, associated brain damage and a fractured thigh bone". Medical evidence showed that Tahani had suffered these injuries around 12 hours before admission to hospital and that she had suffered two other rounds of injuries over between two and five weeks prior to admission. As a result of police interception devices placed in the Mahomed's house the police learned that Azees Mahomed had inflicted the injuries, they acknowledged they had failed to properly look after Tahani and they were "concocting innocent explanations for what had happened to Tahani".

The evidence in contention in these proceedings was known as the "van incident", and involved the Mahomeds leaving Tahani, crying and covered in perspiration in their van near Ōtāhuhu shopping centre on a warm day in December 2007. After a security guard called the police Azees Mahomed left "the scene in a hurry".

In a trial before judge and jury Mr. Mahomed was found guilty of murder and of twice intentionally causing grievous bodily harm; Mr. Mahomed and Mrs. Mahomed were also found guilty of failing to provide the necessaries of life (prompt medical treatment).

The Mahomeds appealed their convictions arguing inadmissibility of evidence of the van incident and improper trial directions to the jury by the judge on this evidence.

== Legislation ==
The case turned on the interpretation of sections 40 and 43 of the Evidence Act 2006.

40 Propensity rule
(1) In this section and sections 41 to 43, propensity evidence—

(a) means evidence that tends to show a person’s propensity to act in a particular way or to have a particular state of mind, being evidence of acts, omissions, events, or circumstances with which a person is alleged to have been involved; but
(b) does not include evidence of an act or omission that is—

(i) 1 of the elements of the offence for which the person is being tried; or
(ii) the cause of action in the proceeding in question.

(2) A party may offer propensity evidence in a civil or criminal proceeding about any person.
(3) However, propensity evidence about—

(a) a defendant in a criminal proceeding may be offered only in accordance with section 41 or 42 or 43, whichever section is applicable; and
(b) a complainant in a sexual case in relation to the complainant’s sexual experience may be offered only in accordance with section 44.

(4) Evidence that is solely or mainly relevant to veracity is governed by the veracity rules set out in section 37 and, accordingly, this section does not apply to evidence of that kind.

43 Propensity evidence offered by prosecution about defendants
(1) The prosecution may offer propensity evidence about a defendant in a criminal proceeding only if the evidence has a probative value in relation to an issue in dispute in the proceeding which outweighs the risk that the evidence may have an unfairly prejudicial effect on the defendant.
(2) When assessing the probative value of propensity evidence, the Judge must take into account the nature of the issue in dispute.
(3) When assessing the probative value of propensity evidence, the Judge may consider, among other matters, the following:

(a) the frequency with which the acts, omissions, events, or circumstances that are the subject of the evidence have occurred:
(b) the connection in time between the acts, omissions, events, or circumstances that are the subject of the evidence and the acts, omissions, events, or circumstances which constitute the offence for which the defendant is being tried:
(c) the extent of the similarity between the acts, omissions, events, or circumstances that are the subject of the evidence and the acts, omissions, events, or circumstances which constitute the offence for which the defendant is being tried:
(d) the number of persons making allegations against the defendant that are the same as, or are similar to, the subject of the offence for which the defendant is being tried:
(e) whether the allegations described in paragraph (d) may be the result of collusion or suggestibility:
(f) the extent to which the acts, omissions, events, or circumstances that are the subject of the evidence and the acts, omissions, events, or circumstances which constitute the offence for which the defendant is being tried are unusual.

(4) When assessing the prejudicial effect of evidence on the defendant, the Judge must consider, among any other matters,—

(a) whether the evidence is likely to unfairly predispose the fact-finder against the defendant; and
(b) whether the fact-finder will tend to give disproportionate weight in reaching a verdict to evidence of other acts or omissions.

== Judgments ==
The Supreme Court dismissed the appeals. The court gave two judgments, both of which, "took a broad approach to s 40(1) and were clear that its language requires a broad approach to determining what is propensity evidence. In the words of the minority, a “broad and literal approach” should be taken. Accordingly, the court unanimously held that evidence that had been categorised by the Court of Appeal as part of the narrative, did fall squarely with s 40(1)."

=== Majority: Elias, Blanchard and Tipping ===
The majority judgment given by Justice Andrew Tipping began by noting that "The greater the linkage or coincidence provided by the propensity evidence, the greater the probative value that evidence is likely to have." The judgment also stated that not "a great deal" could be gained from the pre-Evidence Act case law on propensity evidence. The majority then held that in deciding on admissibility:

"In order to make the necessary assessment the court must carefully identify how and to what extent the propensity evidence has sufficient particularity to be probative, and how and to what extent it risks being unfairly prejudicial. Obviously any evidence that is probative will be prejudicial to the accused but not normally unfairly so. Unfairness is generally found when and to the extent the evidence carries with it a risk that the jury will use it for an improper purpose or in support of an impermissible process of reasoning. In assessing the probative value/unfair prejudice balance, the court may need to take into account the extent to which it considers a "proper use" direction in the trial judge’s summing-up is likely to guard against the risk of improper use."

The majority also noted "it is necessary to identify with some specificity the "particular" state of mind the propensity evidence tends to show and relate that to the states of mind required for each offence." The majority concluded that the "van incident" evidence was admissible only in respect of the charge of failing to provide the necessities of life and that the judge's trial directions on the evidence were "problematical" and "misleading". Satisfied that a miscarriage of justice had occurred, the majority went on to hold that considering the weight of evidence the jury's decisions were inevitable, "in the sense of being the only reasonable possible verdicts on the admissible evidence".

=== Minority: McGrath and Young ===
Justice William Young, giving the minority opinion held that the evidence of the 'van incident' was admissible on all charges. McGrath and Young also held that for propensity evidence “if probative value and the risk of unfair prejudice were equal, exclusion would only be required by s 43”.

== Significance ==
The Mahomed decision is the leading decision in how to interpret section 43 of the Evidence Act 2006. In December 2009 Mr Mahomed was sentenced to a minimum prison sentence of seventeen years and Mrs Mahomed to four years, for crimes described by the sentencing judge as "callous and cowardly".
