= 127 Hobson Street Limited v Honey Bees Preschool Limited =

Case in the Supreme Court of New Zealand

- Court: Supreme Court of New Zealand
- Decided: 5 June 2020
- Citation: [2020] NZSC 53
- Transcript: Available here

Case history
- Prior action: High Court [2018] NZHC 32; Court of Appeal [2019] NZCA 122

Court membership
- Judges sitting: Winkelmann CJ, O’Regan, Ellen France, Williams and Arnold JJ

Keywords
- Contract law, penalty clauses, indemnity, proportionality

127 Hobson Street Limited v Honey Bees Preschool Limited was a decision of the Supreme Court of New Zealand concerning the enforceability of penalty clauses in contract law. The case clarified the modern test for determining whether a contractual provision constitutes an unenforceable penalty.

== Background ==
The case arose from a commercial lease of premises in Auckland between 127 Hobson Street Ltd (the landlord) and Honey Bees Preschool Ltd (the tenant), which intended to operate a childcare centre on the fifth floor of the building.

Access to the premises was a significant issue, as the building was serviced by only one lift. During negotiations, the parties entered into a collateral deed under which the landlord agreed to install a second lift by 31 July 2016. The deed further provided that if the lift was not installed on time, the landlord would indemnify the tenant for its obligations under the lease, including rent and outgoings.

The lift was not completed by the agreed deadline. Honey Bees sought to enforce the indemnity clause, while 127 Hobson argued that the clause was an unenforceable penalty.

== Judgment ==
The Supreme Court dismissed the appeal and held that the indemnity clause was enforceable.

The Court held that the correct test for determining whether a clause is a penalty is whether the consequence imposed for breach is out of all proportion to the legitimate interests of the innocent party in performance of the primary obligation.

The Court rejected the traditional approach that focused on whether the clause represented a genuine pre-estimate of loss. Instead, it held that legitimate interests may extend beyond compensatory damages and include broader commercial interests, such as protecting business viability and deterring breach.

Applying this test, the Court found that Honey Bees had a legitimate interest in ensuring the installation of the second lift, as it was important to the operation and profitability of the childcare business. The indemnity clause was not out of proportion to that interest, particularly given the time allowed for performance and the commercial context of the agreement.

== Significance ==
The decision is a leading authority on the modern law of penalties in New Zealand. It aligns New Zealand law with developments in the United Kingdom and Australia by adopting a proportionality-based approach centred on legitimate interests, rather than a strict comparison with anticipated damages.
