= Greg Kane (rugby union) =

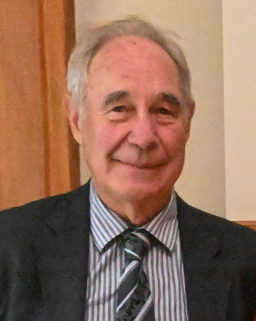
- Kane in 2025
- Born: Gregory Norman Kane; 12 October 1952 (age 74) Tauranga, New Zealand
- Height: 1.83 m (6 ft 0 in)
- Weight: 83 kg (183 lb)
- School: Tauranga Boys' College
- University: University of Waikato
- Notable relative: Susan Glazebrook (wife)

Rugby union career
- Position: Second five-eighth, three-quarter
Provincial / State sides
Years	Team	Apps	(Points)
1971–1975	Waikato	48	(34)
1976	Wellington	9	(4)
1979–1980	Bay of Plenty	20	(4)
International career
Years	Team	Apps	(Points)
1974	New Zealand	0	(0)

Gregory Norman Kane (born 12 October 1952) is a former New Zealand rugby union player. A second five-eighth and three-quarter, Kane represented Waikato, Wellington and Bay of Plenty at a provincial level, and was a member of the New Zealand national side, the All Blacks, in 1974. He played seven matches for the All Blacks but did not appear in any internationals.

In 1992, Kane married Susan Glazebrook, a lawyer and later Supreme Court judge, and the couple went on to have two children together.
