= Brooker v Police =

- Court: Supreme Court of New Zealand
- Full case name: Allistair Patrick Brooker v Police
- Decided: 4 May 2007
- Citation: [2007] NZSC 30, [2007] 3 NZLR 91
- Transcript: Available here

Case history
- Prior action: Greymouth District Court 30 June 2003; Greymouth High Court 16 October 2003; Court of Appeal (2004) 22 CRNZ 162

Court membership
- Judges sitting: Elias CJ, Blanchard, Tipping, McGrath and Thomas JJ.

Keywords
- Criminal law, Constitutional law, New Zealand Bill of Rights Act 1990

Brooker v Police was a case in the Supreme Court of New Zealand that concerned the meaning of "behaves in [a] disorderly manner" under section 4(1)(a) of the Summary Offences Act 1981 in light of s 14 of the New Zealand Bill of Rights Act 1990 which protects freedom of expression. The majority of the Supreme Court overturned the previous test for disorderly behaviour "which found the offence proven where behaviour was so annoying that "right-thinking members of the public" could not be expected to tolerate it"; and set aside Allistair Brooker's conviction for disorderly behaviour. Justices McGrath and Thomas in the minority argued that the right to freedom of expression should be balanced against a citizen's right to privacy in their own home.

== Background ==
On Tuesday 18 March 2003 at about 9:20am Allistair Brooker went to the home of a Greymouth Police Constable Fiona Croft, "believing that he had been the subject of harassment over a number of years by the police, and by Constable Croft in particular".

Brooker had decided to stage a protest, and

Having tried to contact her at work, he went to her home, knowing that she had been on night duty and was likely to be there. He parked his car on the grass verge outside her front fence, walked onto the property and knocked on the front door. After about three minutes the constable came to the door. He suggested to her that she did not like being woken up, and she told him to “piss off”. He withdrew to the street and began his protest outside her front fence. He had with him a square metre placard on which was written “No more bogus warrants” and which he lent against the fence. He then began playing his guitar and singing in what the trial Judge described as a “relatively” loud voice.

Constable Croft rang the police station, gave evidence that she was intimidated by the protest and within minutes police officers had arrived at the house. The senior police officer told Brooker he had one minute to leave or "he would be arrested for intimidation". Brooker put his guitar and placard in his car, parked it on the opposite side of the road, and "returned to the inspector with his hands held out in the form of an invitation to the inspector to arrest and handcuff him. He was duly arrested for intimidation."

In the District Court, the judge considered that there was insufficient evidence of intent to intimidate and the charge was amended to one of behaving in a disorderly manner contrary to s 4(1)(a) of the Summary Offences Act 1981. On that count of disorderly behaviour Brooker was found guilty and his appeal to the High Court was dismissed. Brookers appeal to the Court of Appeal was also dismissed. Brooker appealed to the Supreme Court.

== Judgments ==
=== Elias CJ ===
The judgment of Chief Justice Elias traversed the legal history of section 4(1)(a) of the Summary Offences Act and the approach of other Commonwealth jurisdictions to similar crimes, before observing,

It is clear that behaviour which is disorderly under s 4 need not be likely to lead to violence because behaviour likely to cause that effect is covered by s 3. What is essential however is that the behaviour is disruptive of public order and is not simply a private affront or annoyance to a person present or to whom the behaviour is directed.

On that assessment Elias CJ held that Brooker's protest was not disorderly.

=== Blanchard J ===
Justice Blanchard also held that Brooker's behaviour was not disorderly noting, "In my view Mr Brooker's question [to a police officer outside Croft's house] "Is it disorderly yet?" was in point. My answer would be in the negative." Similarly to the decision of Elias CJ, Blanchard J observed,

[S]omeone should not be convicted of disorderly behaviour unless there has been a substantial disruption of public order in or about a public place, although that disruption does not have to have created or been likely to create a breach of the peace. Causing annoyance, even considerable annoyance, to citizens does not suffice.

=== Tipping J ===
Justice Tipping formulated what he saw as the correct test of disorderly behaviour as;

Conduct in a qualifying location is disorderly if, as a matter of time, place and circumstance, it causes anxiety or disturbance at a level which is beyond what a reasonable citizen should be expected to bear. Unless that is so, the conduct will not warrant the intervention of the criminal law. If it is so, the public has a legitimate interest in proscribing the behaviour, and thereby protecting citizens from it. In this way public order is protected.

Tipping J noted that Constable Croft was the only person affected by Brooker's protest and that, "His behaviour, viewed objectively, did not in all the circumstances cause anxiety or disturbance at a level beyond that which a reasonable person in Constable Croft’s shoes should be expected to bear."

=== McGrath J ===
Justice McGrath, alongside Thomas J, gave one of the two dissenting judgments in the Court's decision. McGrath J focused his judgment on "reconciling the conflicts" between Brooker's right to protest and Constable Croft's right to privacy before stating that,

Under s 5 of the New Zealand Bill of Rights Act, all fundamental rights and freedoms may be made subject to such reasonable limits, prescribed by law, as can be demonstrably justified in a free and democratic society. In order to be such a limit on the protester’s right of free expression, the offence of disorderly behaviour must be restricted to conduct that amounts to a sufficiently serious and reprehensible interference with the rights of others to warrant the intervention of the criminal law. At that point the protester’s legitimate exercise of freedom of expression ends.

McGrath J thought that Brooker's disturbed the constables "enjoyment of tranquility and privacy in her home" and as a result held Brooker's protest "went well beyond what any citizen, public official or not, should have to tolerate in her home environment."

=== Thomas J ===
Justice Thomas dissented alongside McGrath J, and his lengthy judgment observes that the meaning of disorderly behaviour is largely indeterminate; that the law should provide the test of the reasonable person; and should seek to balance all of the rights, values and interests which are in issue in each particular case. In conclusion Thomas J argued strongly against the majority stating, "I would much prefer that both freedom of expression and privacy be recognised as fundamental values and, as such, weighed one against the other in a manner designed to afford the greatest protection to both."
