= R v Wanhalla =

- Court: Court of Appeal of New Zealand
- Full case name: R v Wanhalla and Court
- Decided: 24 August 2006
- Citation: [2007] 2 NZLR 573

Court membership
- Judges sitting: William Young P, Glazebrook, Hammond, Chambers and Robertson JJ

Keywords
- Jury directions, Standard and burden of proof, reasonable doubt

R v Wanhalla was a case in the Court of Appeal of New Zealand concerning how a judge should direct a jury in a criminal case as to interpretation of the standard of proof, beyond reasonable doubt. Australian jurist Brian Martin has described the judgments in the "decision as particularly helpful. They contain reviews of research, practices in other jurisdictions and primary issues in the debate."

== Background ==
J. Wanhalla and R. Court were tried, along with three others, in the Christchurch District Court before a judge and jury on an indictment alleging one count of aggravated burglary and three counts of injuring with intent to cause grievous bodily harm.

The Crown alleged that on 30 July 2004 three carloads of people drove from Rangiora to Culverden in order to exact retribution for an incident involving Wanhalla's sister. Armed (with cricket wickets, metal pipe and bottles) and disguised, Wanhalla and his associates entered the victims' house and inflicted "significant injuries" on three victims as well as damaging the property, its contents and three vehicles parked outside.

The police intercepted one of the vehicles, containing Wanhalla and Court, while returning to Rangiora. One of the vehicle's other occupants gave evidence that implicated Wanhalla and Court in the offending. Evidence against Wanhalla included a blood stain, "almost certainly came from one of the victims", on his sweatshirt and glass fragments, similar to a broken television at the property, in his shoes. Evidence against Court included a "significant number of text messages were sent from her cellphone to the cellphone of one of the co-offenders. the person who sent these messages was seeking to recruit that co-offender in the attack on the victims' house".

Wanhalla and Court were found guilty by the jury on all counts and appealed against their convictions on a number of grounds, the most important relating to the way the Judge summed up to the jury on the standard of proof.

In his summing up in the District Court Judge Abbott had told the jury, amongst other directions on the standard of proof, that, "the Crown does not have to prove a charge to the point of absolute scientific or mathematical certainty, in other words beyond all doubt or any shadow of doubt." Additionally, Judge Abbott told the jury, "and it is often said that members of a jury should be as sure about a conclusion of guilt as they would want to be about making an important decision in the context of their own personal lives."

== Judgments ==
The appeals were dismissed. The Court of Appeal reviewed New Zealand, Australian, English and Canadian jury directions on the standard of proof and held unanimously that the Judge had been entitled to "tell the jury that absolute or mathematical certainty was not required." The Court also held that when people make important life decisions they often rely on "elements of speculation, hope, prejudice, emotion", as such the "everyday life analogy" has the "potential to puzzle jurors and for this reason is not helpful". However the Court did not think the analogy "caused any risk of a miscarriage of justice".

=== Model directions ===
President William Young delivered the majority judgment which included a model set of jury directions the Court was "inclined to view that Judges should explain the concept of proof beyond reasonable doubt in these terms".

The starting point is the presumption of innocence. You must treat the accused as innocent until the Crown has proved his or her guilt. The presumption of innocence means that the accused does not have to give or call any evidence and does not have to establish his or her innocence.

The Crown must prove that the accused is guilty beyond reasonable doubt. Proof beyond reasonable doubt is a very high standard of proof which the Crown will have met only if, at the end of the case, you are sure that the accused is guilty.
It is not enough for the Crown to persuade you that the accused is probably guilty or even that he or she is very likely guilty. On the other hand, it is virtually impossible to prove anything to an absolute certainty when dealing with the reconstruction of past events and the Crown does not have to do so.

What then is reasonable doubt? A reasonable doubt is an honest and reasonable uncertainty left in your mind about the guilt of the accused after you have given careful and impartial consideration to all of the evidence. In summary, if, after careful and impartial consideration of the evidence, you are sure that the accused is guilty you must find him or her guilty. On the other hand, if you are not sure that the accused is guilty, you must find him or her not guilty.
