= Mark O'Regan =

New Zealand lawyer and jurist

The Honourable Sir Mark O'Regan KNZM
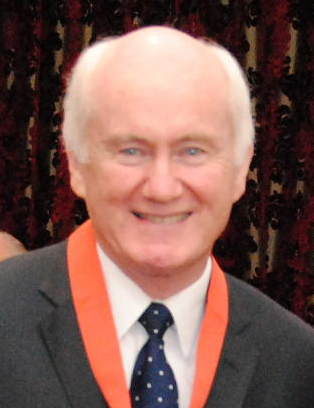
- O'Regan in 2013

Justice of the Supreme Court
- In office 1 September 2014 – 30 November 2023
- Succeeded by: Forrest Miller

President of the Court of Appeal
- In office 2010–2014
- Preceded by: Sir William Young
- Succeeded by: Dame Ellen France

Personal details
- Born: Mark Andrew O'Regan; 30 November 1953 (age 72)
- Spouse: Nicola Saker
- Education: Victoria University of Wellington

Sir Mark Andrew O'Regan KNZM (born 30 November 1953) is a New Zealand lawyer and jurist. He was the President of the Court of Appeal of New Zealand until his elevation to the Supreme Court of New Zealand in 2014.

== Biography ==
Born on 30 November 1953 and educated at St Patrick's College, Silverstream, O'Regan graduated from Victoria University of Wellington. He was admitted as a barrister and solicitor of the High Court in 1977 and became a partner with the law firm Chapman Tripp in 1984. As a lawyer, he was known particularly for his expertise in relation to commercial law. He co-authored the New Zealand Law Commission paper which led to the eventual adoption of a register for personal property securities in New Zealand.

O'Regan was appointed to the High Court in 2001 and to the Court of Appeal in January 2004. He was elevated to the Supreme Court in 2014.

In the 2013 New Year Honours, O'Regan was appointed a Knight Companion of the New Zealand Order of Merit for services to the judiciary.

O'Regan is married to the writer Nicola Saker, who in the 2023 King's Birthday and Coronation Honours was appointed a Member of the New Zealand Order of Merit, for services to heritage preservation and the arts.

On 2 November 2023, shortly before reaching the mandatory age of retirement, O'Regan was granted retention of the title The Honourable for life, in recognition of his service as a judge of the Supreme Court, Court of Appeal, and High Court.

On 17 March 2026, associate Emergency Management and Recovery Minister Chris Penk appointed O'Regan as the chair of the New Zealand government's inquiry into the Mount Maunganui and Papamoa landslides which occurred during the January 2026 New Zealand storms.
