= David Mauger =

New Zealand neurologist (1936–2022)

Sir David Mauger KNZM
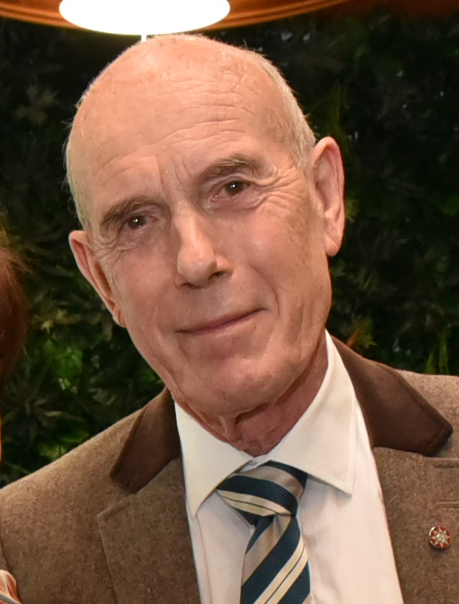
- Mauger in 2021
- Born: David Charles Mauger
- Education: University of Otago
- Occupation: Paediatric oncologist
- Known for: Performed first bone marrow transplant in New Zealand

Sir David Charles Mauger KNZM is a New Zealand paediatric oncologist. He was the first paediatric oncologist in New Zealand, and performed New Zealand's first paediatric bone marrow transplant.

== Early life and family ==
Mauger's parents were Clarence Charles Mauger and Jessie Bannerman Mauger (née Mackenzie). His father was a member of the 1914–1917 Imperial Trans-Antarctic Expedition, serving as shipwright on the Aurora, and later had a peak, Mauger Nunatak, in the Ross Dependency named in his honour.

Mauger was educated at Arthur Street School in Dunedin, and Otago Boys' High School, where he played in the school's 1st XV rugby union team. He later played for the Otago University rugby team while a student at the University of Otago.

As a youth, Mauger was a promising swimmer as a member of the Dunedin Amateur Swimming Club, where he was coached by Bernard "Punch" Tremaine. In 1949, he won the De Crewe Challenge Cup as the club's under-12 25-yards breaststroke champion. In June 1951, he set a New Zealand under-14 boys' record for the 100-yards breastroke, with a time of 1:21.8, breaking the previous record by 0.6 seconds.

== Medical career ==
Mauger studied medicine at the University of Otago, graduating Bachelor of Medicine, Bachelor of Surgery, in 1963. He later worked at Princess Mary Children's Hospital and Starship Hospital in Auckland. He became the first paediatric oncologist in New Zealand, and performed New Zealand's first paediatric bone marrow transplant.

Mauger was a founding member of the Child Cancer Foundation in 1978, and in 1999 he was made a life member. In the 2002 Queen's Birthday and Golden Jubilee Honours, he was appointed a Distinguished Companion of the New Zealand Order of Merit, for services to paediatrics. Following the reintroduction of titular honours by the New Zealand government in 2009, he accepted redesignation as a Knight Companion of the New Zealand Order of Merit.
