= 2009 Special Honours (New Zealand) =

Change in titular honours usage in New Zealand

- Previous: 2009 Queen's Birthday Honours; Next: 2010 New Year Honours
- Type: New Zealand royal honours: New Zealand Order of Merit
- Date: 1 August 2009
- Country: New Zealand

Highlights
- Total recipients: 72

The 2009 Special Honours in New Zealand were announced on 1 August 2009 as a result of the reinstatement of the appellations of "Sir" and "Dame" to the New Zealand Royal Honours System by passing Special Regulation 2009/90 Additional Statutes of The New Zealand Order of Merit, a legally binding regulation with the force of law in New Zealand.

The effect of the change was that individuals who had been appointed as Principal Companions or Distinguished Companions of the New Zealand Order of Merit were given the option of accepting titular honours: Principal Companions could opt to become Knights or Dames Grand Companion, and Distinguished Companions could become Knights or Dames Companion. Of the 85 living Principal and Distinguished Companions at the time, all but 13 accepted redesignation. Living widows of deceased male Principal or Distinguished Companions were eligible to be granted the courtesy title of "Lady".

The recipients are listed as they were styled before the redesignation, and the date given in brackets is the date of the original appointment as a Principal or Distinguished Companion of the New Zealand Order of Merit.

== New Zealand Order of Merit ==
=== Knight Grand Companion (GNZM) ===
The following Principal Companions were redesignated Knights Grand Companion:

- Professor Paul Terence Callaghan – of Wellington (31 December 2005).
- Emeritus Professor Lloyd George Geering ONZ CBE – of Wellington (30 December 2000).
- Sir Patrick Ledger Goodman CBE – of Motueka (3 June 2002).
- Professor Ralph Heberley Ngātata Love QSO JP – of Porirua (31 December 2008).
- His Excellency The Honourable Anand Satyanand QSO – governor-general of New Zealand (4 June 2006). (Note: Satyanand's redesignation as a Knight Grand Companion took effect on 27 March 2009.)
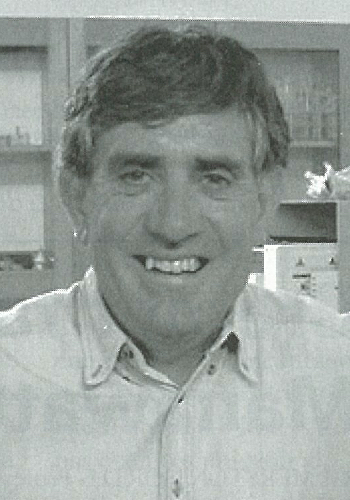
Sir Paul Callaghan

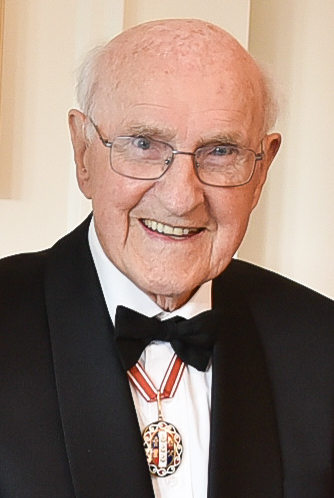
Sir Lloyd Geering

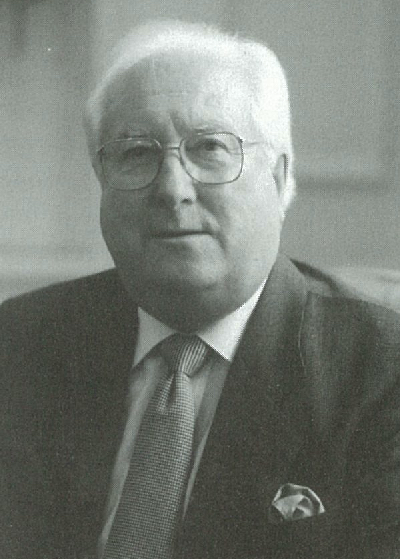
Sir Pat Goodman

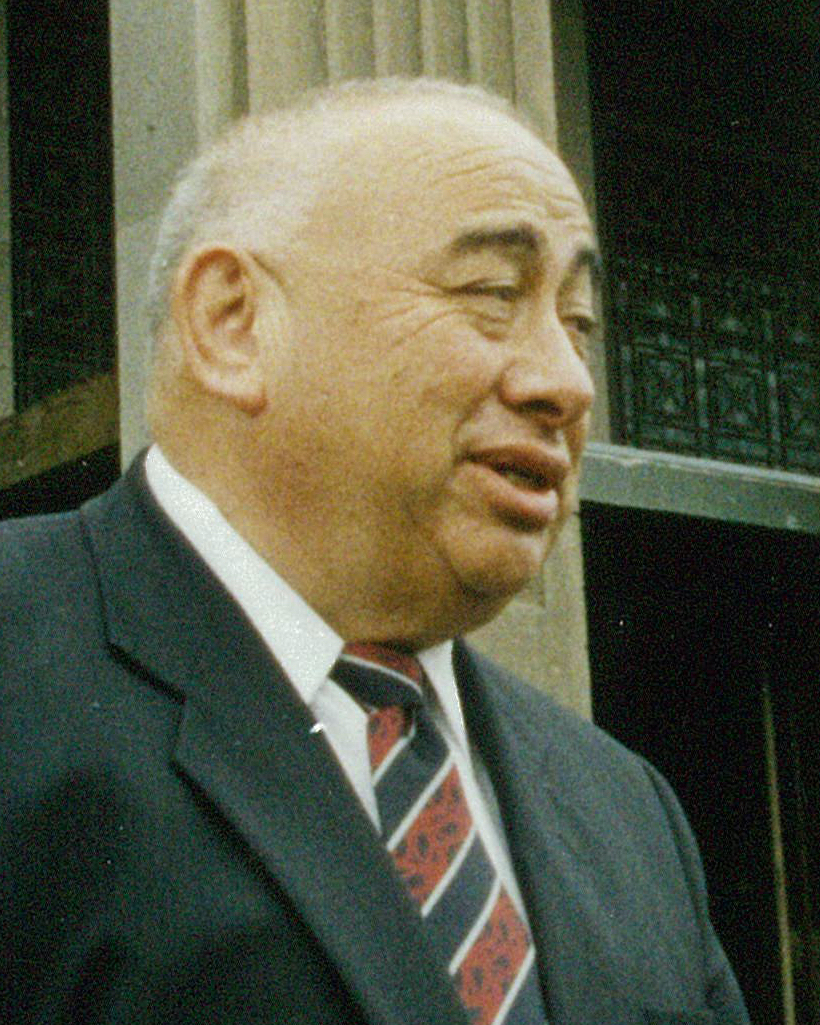
Sir Ngātata Love

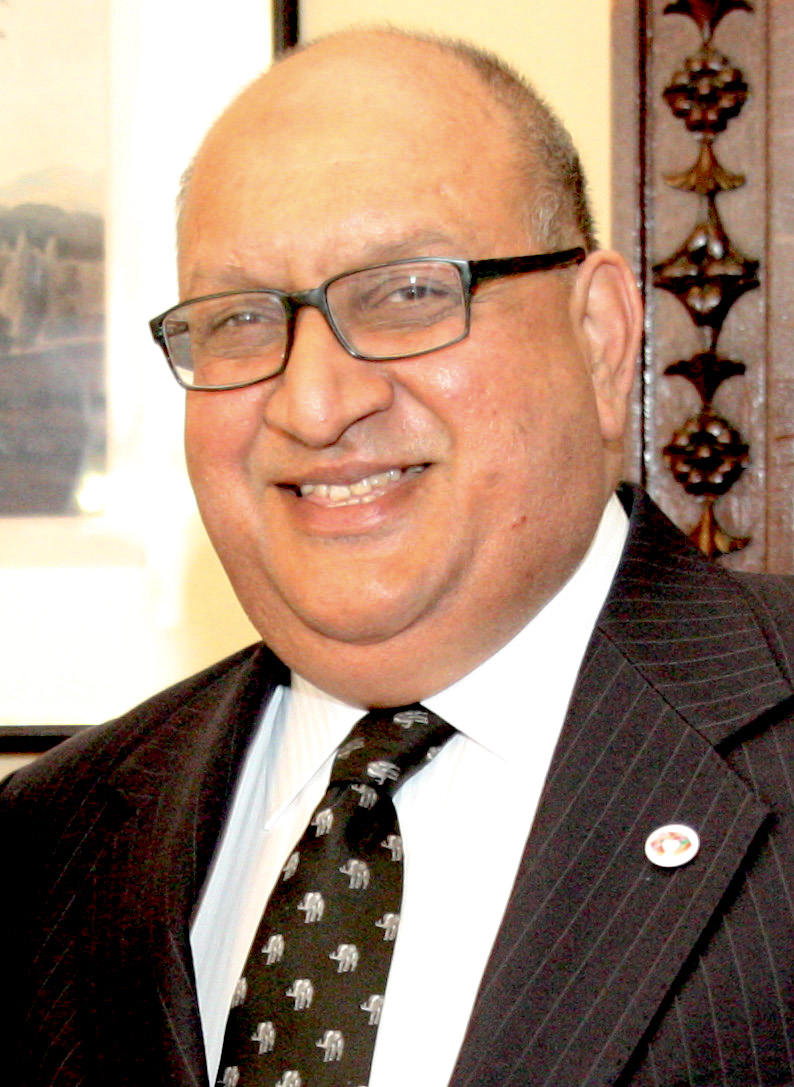
Sir Anand Satyanand

=== Dame Companion (DNZM) ===
The following Distinguished Companions were redesignated Dames Companion:

- (Isoleen) Heather Begg OBE – of Sydney, Australia (5 June 2000). (Note: Beggs's redesignation as a Dame Companion took effect on 17 April 2009, before her death the following month.)
- Emeritus Professor Judith Mary Caroline Binney – of Auckland (31 December 2005).
- Dr Vera Doreen Blumhardt ONZ CBE – of Wellington (31 December 2002).
- Professor Margaret Clark CMG JP – of Wellington (30 December 2006).
- Christine McKelvie Cole Catley QSM – of North Shore (5 June 2006).
- Lynley Stuart Dodd – of Tauranga (31 December 2001).
- Dr Mary Josephine Drayton MBE – of Tauranga (31 December 2004).
- Jocelyn Barbara Fish CBE JP – of Hamilton (30 December 2000).
- Patricia Mary Harrison QSO – of Dunedin (4 June 2001).
- Grace Shellie Hollander CBE JP – of Christchurch (5 June 2000).
- Professor Linda Jane Holloway – of Dunedin (6 June 2005).
- Margaret Mary Millard JP – of Palmerston North (30 December 2001).
- Deirdre Glenna Milne QSO – of Auckland (31 December 2003).
- Lois Joan Muir OBE – of Dunedin (7 June 2004).
- Dr Claudia Josepha Orange OBE – of Wellington (31 December 2008).
- Alison Burns Quentin-Baxter QSO – of Wellington (4 June 2007).
- Alison Mary Roxburgh CBE QSO JP – of Nelson (2 June 2003).
- The Honourable Margaret Kerslake Shields QSO JP – of Pukerua Bay (31 December 2007).
- The Right Honourable Jennifer Mary Shipley – of Auckland (31 December 2002).
- Dr Margaret June Sparrow MBE – of Wellington (3 June 2002).
- Sukhinder Kaur Turner – of Wānaka (3 June 2002).
- Robin Adair White – of Masterton (2 June 2003).
- Gillian Karawe Whitehead – of Alexandra (2 June 2008).
Dame Judith Binney

Dame Doreen Blumhardt

Dame Christine Cole Catley

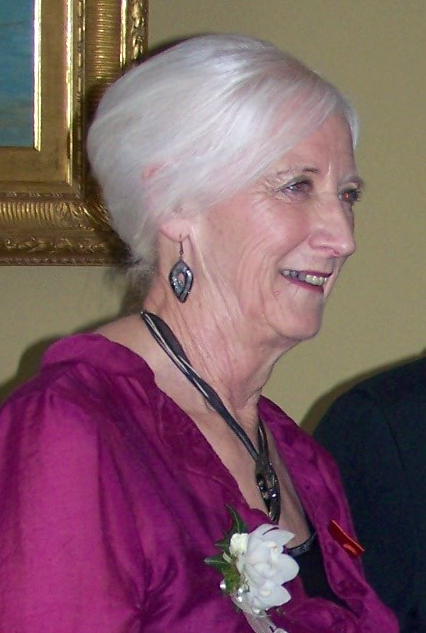
Dame Lois Muir

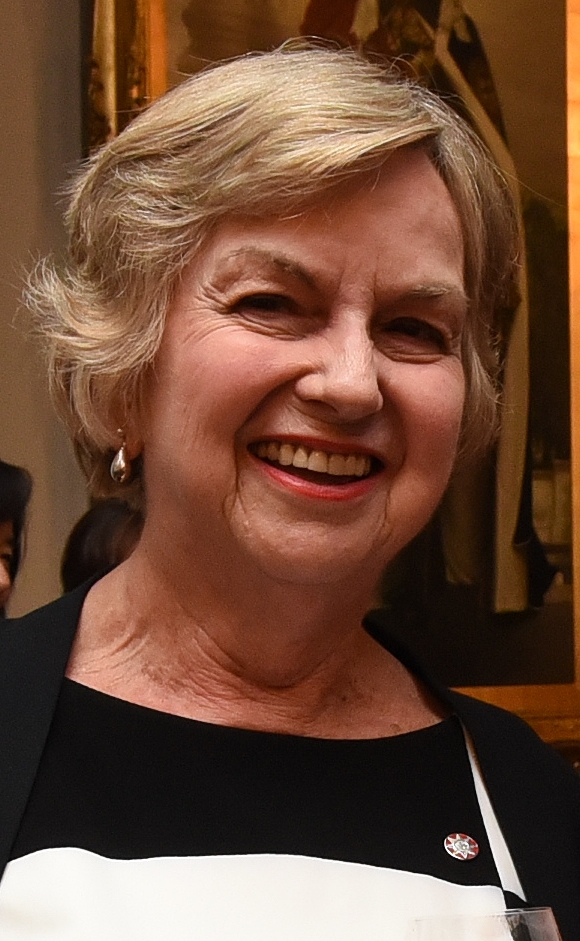
Dame Claudia Orange

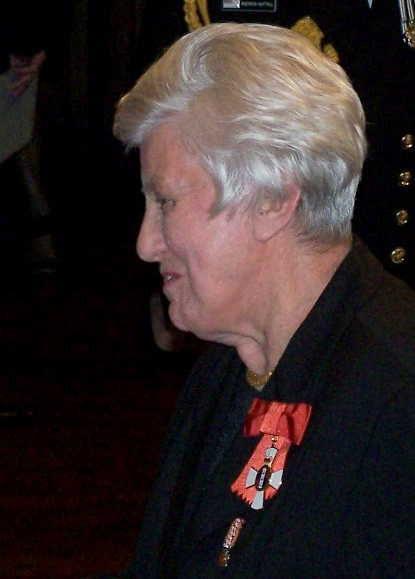
Dame Alison Quentin-Baxter

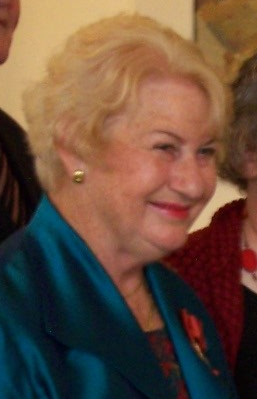
Dame Margaret Shields

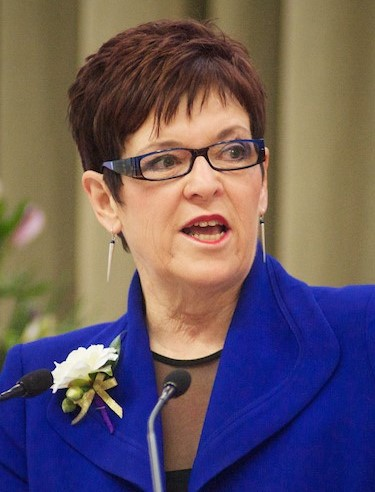
Dame Jenny Shipley

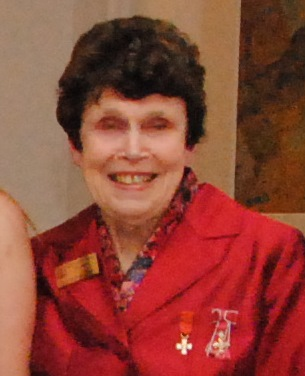
Dame Margaret Sparrow

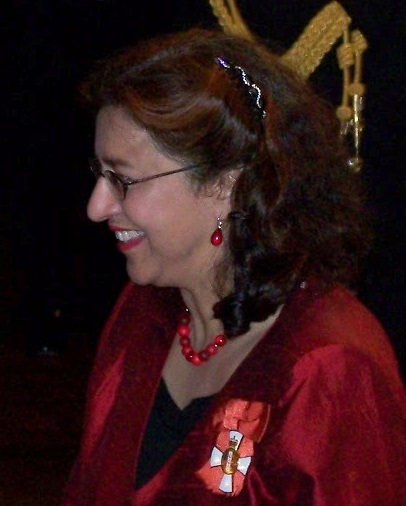
Dame Sukhi Turner

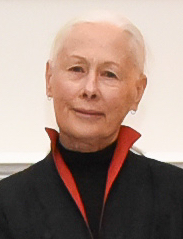
Dame Robin White

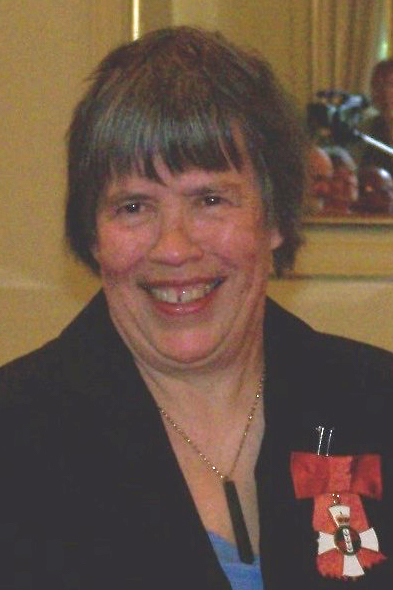
Dame Gillian Whitehead

=== Knight Companion (KNZM) ===
The following Distinguished Companions were redesignated Knights Companion:

- The Honourable Noel Crossley Anderson QC – of Waitakere (7 June 2004).
- Professor Donald Ward Beaven CBE – of Christchurch (31 December 2004).
- The Right Honourable Peter Blanchard PC – of Wellington (31 December 2004).
- Judge David James Carruthers – of Paraparaumu (6 June 2005).
- Russell Coutts CBE – of Valencia, Spain (5 June 2000).
- The Honourable Edward Taihakurei Junior Durie – of Lower Hutt (31 December 2007).
- Eion Sinclair Edgar – of Queenstown (2 June 2003).
- Air Marshal Bruce Reid Ferguson OBE OBE AFC RNZAF – of Wellington (5 June 2006).
- George Vjeceslav Fistonich – of Auckland (6 June 2005).
- Dr Alan Russell Frampton – of Auckland (31 December 2004).
- Lieutenant-Colonel Harawira Tiri Gardiner – of Wellington (2 June 2008).
- David Rendel Kingston Gascoigne CBE – of Wellington (31 December 2005).
- The Right Honourable Thomas Munro Gault QC PC – of Auckland (30 December 2000).
- Professor Peter David Gluckman – of Auckland (31 December 2007).
- John Packard Goulter JP – of Paihia (31 December 2003).
- The Honourable John William Hansen – of Rangiora (2 June 2008).
- The Right Honourable John Steele Henry QC – of Auckland (4 June 2001).
- Professor Vaughan Frederick Randal Jones – of Piedmont, California, United States of America (3 June 2002).
- The Honourable Douglas Lorimer Kidd – of Wellington (5 June 2000).
- Patrick Desmond Mahony – of Wellington (31 December 2003).
- Peter Charles Maire – of North Shore (2 June 2008).
- Professor Alan Francis Mark CBE – of Dunedin (30 December 2000).
- Emeritus Professor Arthur Harold Marshall – of Auckland (2 June 2008).
- Dr David Charles Mauger – of Auckland (3 June 2002).
- The Honourable John Joseph McGrath – of Wellington (30 December 2006).
- Dr Sidney Moko Mead – of Wellington (5 June 2006).
- Colin Earl Meads MBE – of Te Kūiti (30 December 2000).
- Ralph James Norris – of Sydney, New South Wales, Australia (31 December 2005).
- Noel Stuart Robinson – of Auckland (5 June 2006).
- Peter Graham Siddell QSO – of Auckland (31 December 2007).
- Professor David Christopher Graham Skegg OBE – of Dunedin (31 December 2008).
- Bruce Houlton Slane CBE – of Auckland (31 December 2002).
- Dr Peter George Snell OBE – of Dallas, Texas, United States of America (31 December 2001).
- Kenneth Allen Stevens – of Auckland (31 December 2007).
- Archie John Te Atawhai Taiaroa – of Taumarunui (2 June 2003).
- Tumu (George Michael) Te Heuheu – of Taupō (31 December 2004).
- The Right Honourable Edmund Walter Thomas QC – of Auckland (31 December 2001).
- Stephen Robert Tindall – of North Shore (4 June 2007).
- The Right Honourable Andrew Patrick Charles Tipping – of Wellington (31 December 2005).
- Peter John Trapski CBE – of Tauranga (31 December 2002).
- Henry William van der Heyden – of Putāruru (4 June 2007).
- John Wells – of Auckland (31 December 2008).
- Tennant Edward (Tay) Wilson OBE – of Lower Hutt (30 December 2006).
- The Honourable William Gillow Gibbes Austen Young QC – of Christchurch (4 June 2007).
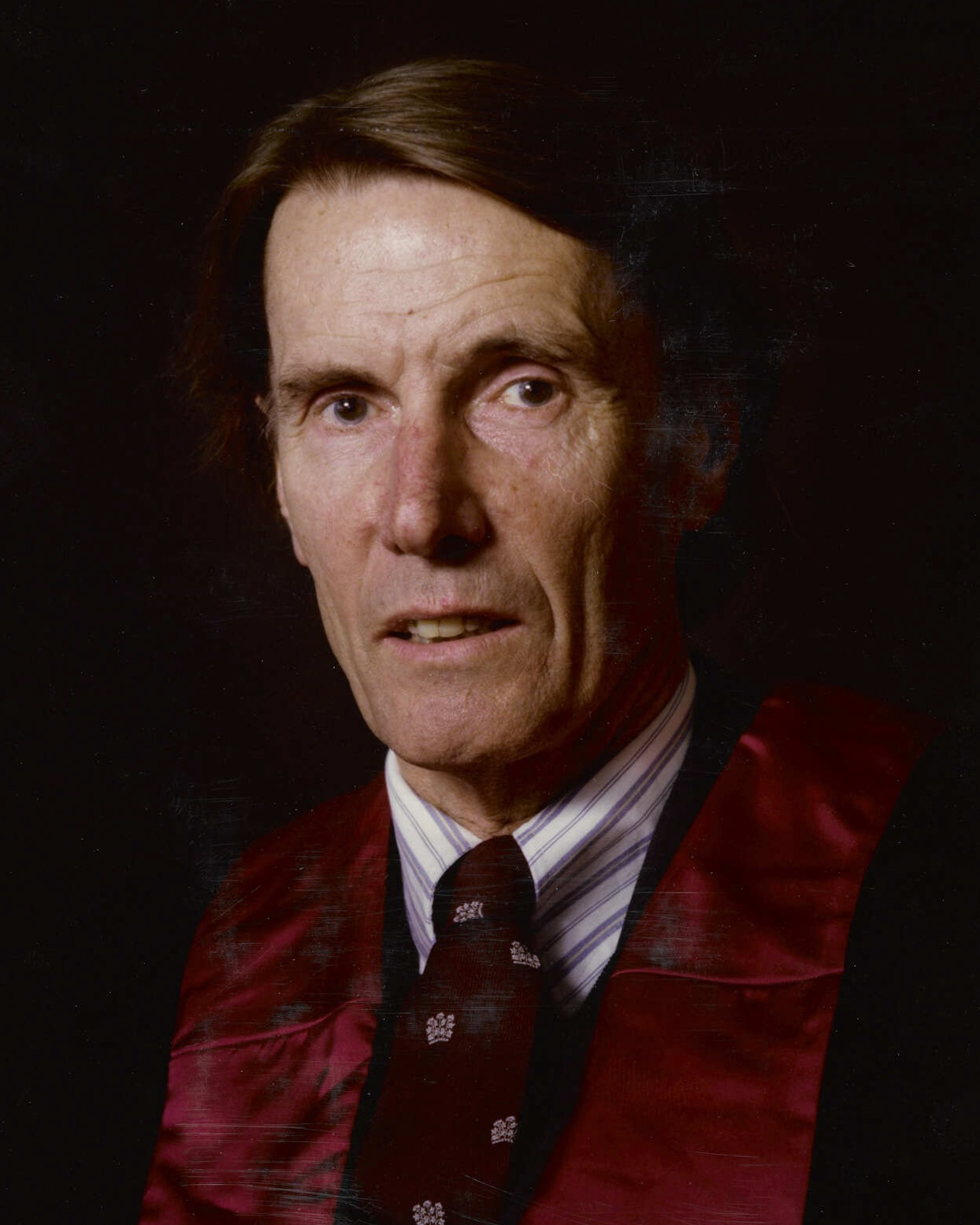
Sir Don Beaven

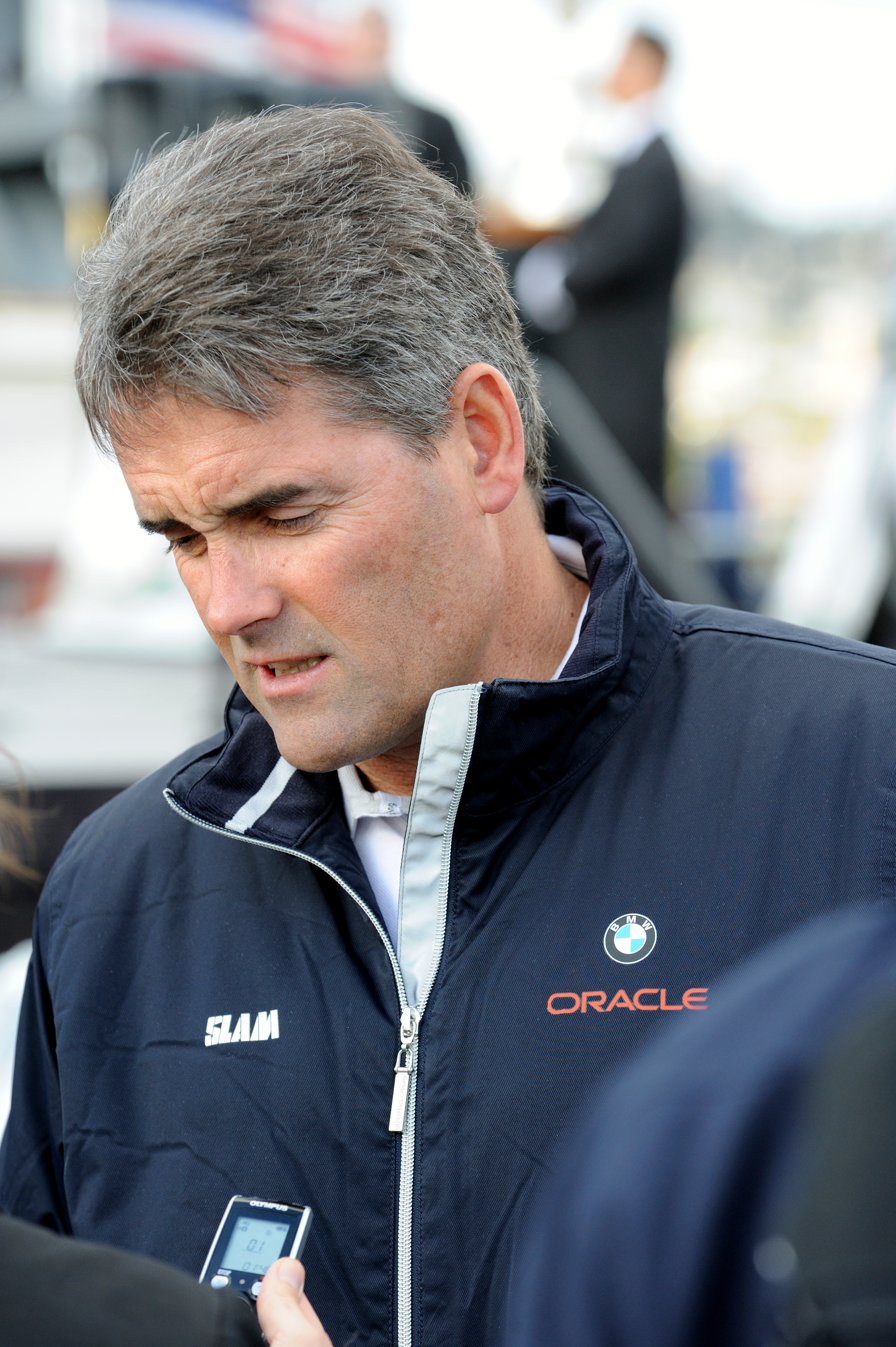
Sir Russell Coutts

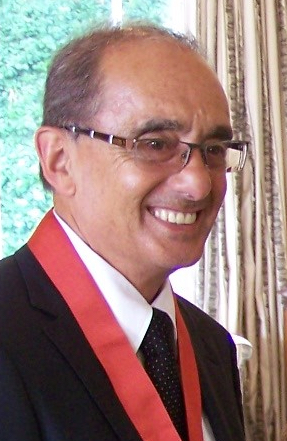
Sir Eddie Durie

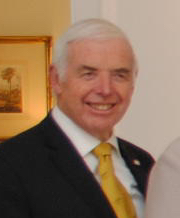
Sir Eion Edgar

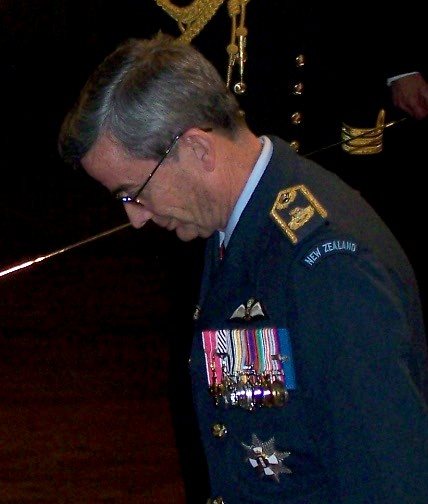
Sir Bruce Ferguson

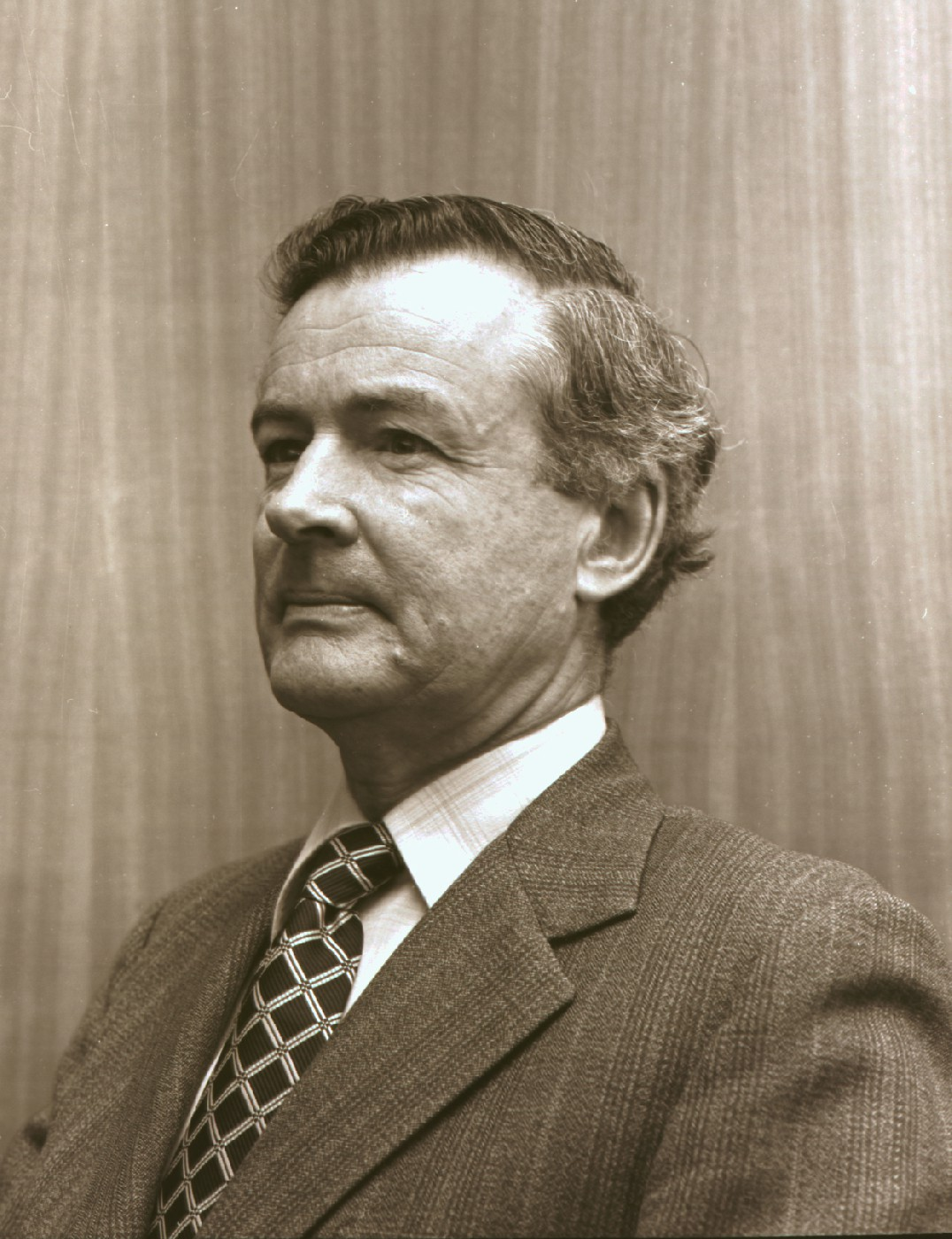
Sir Alan Frampton

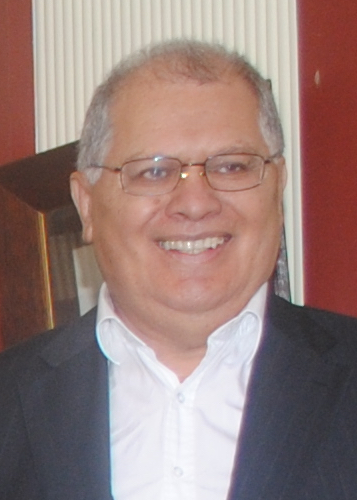
Sir Wira Gardiner

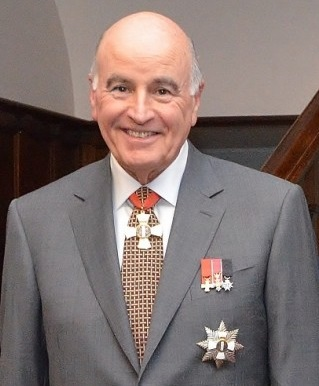
Sir David Gascoigne

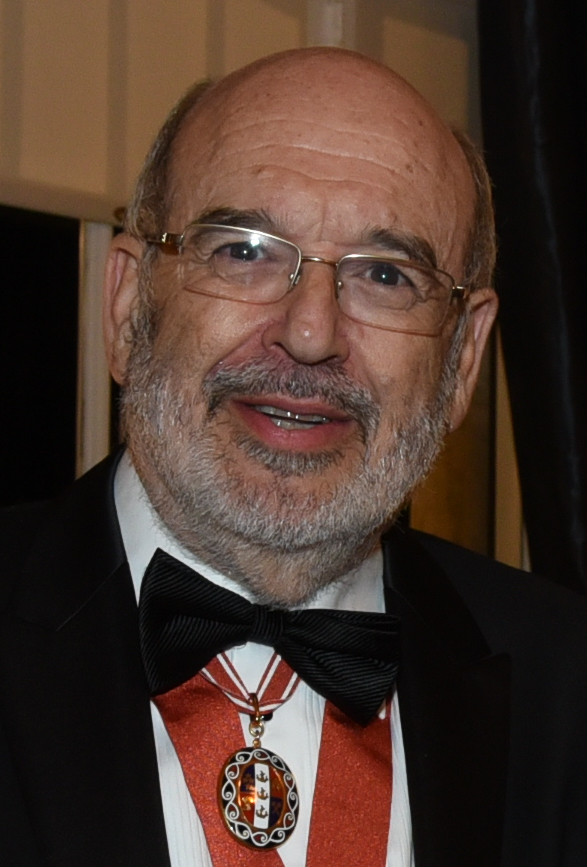
Sir Peter Gluckman

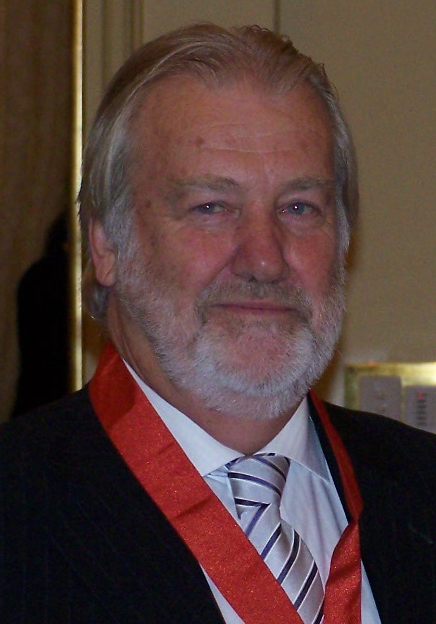
Sir John Hansen

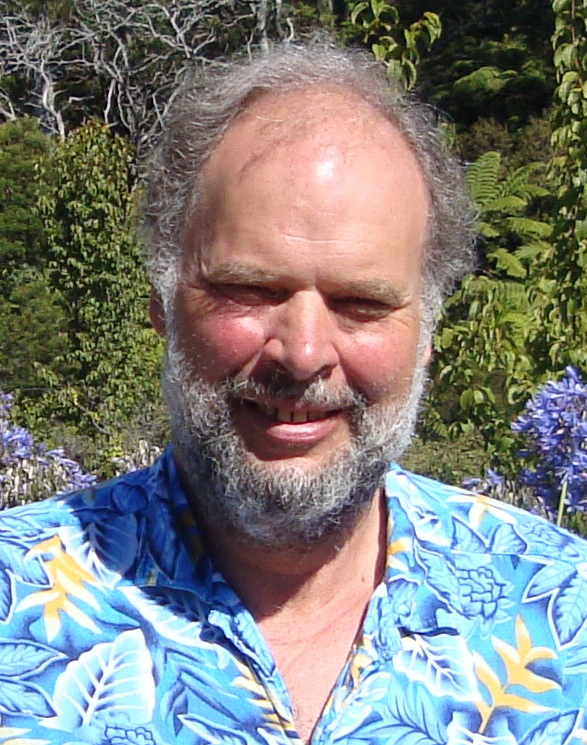
Sir Vaughan Jones

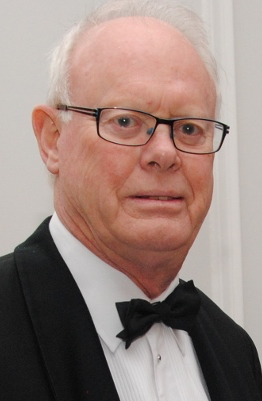
Sir Doug Kidd

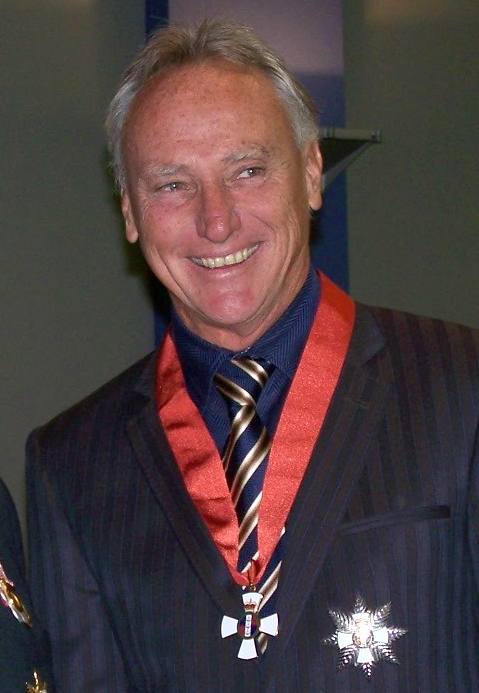
Sir Peter Maire

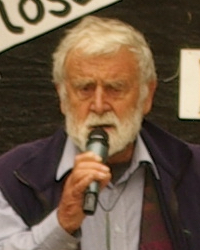
Sir Alan Mark

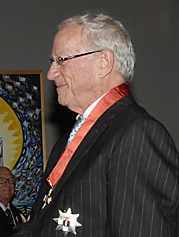
Sir Harold Marshall

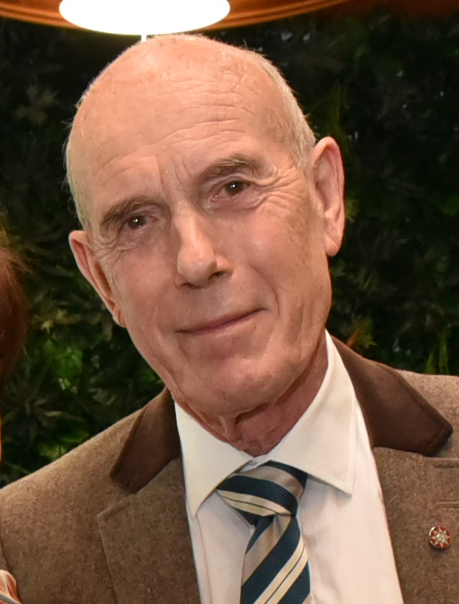
Sir David Mauger

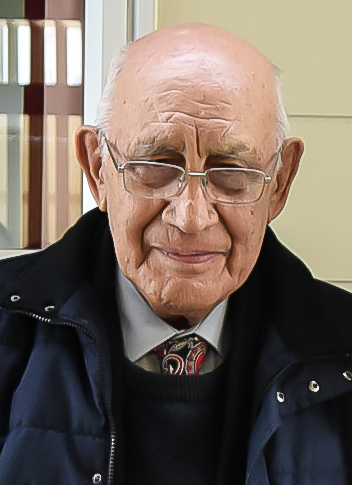
Sir Hirini Moko Mead

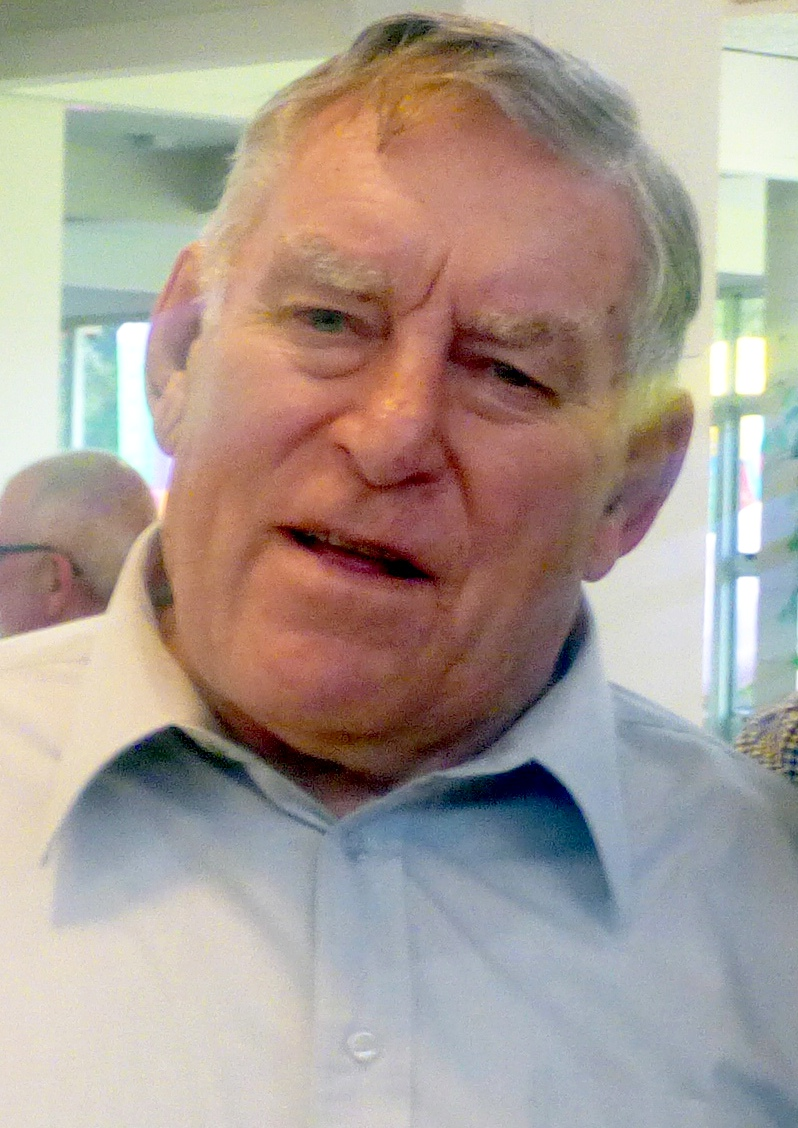
Sir Colin Meads

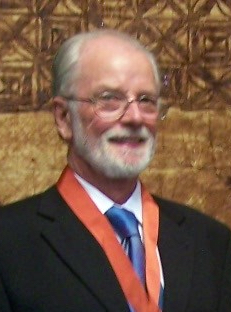
Sir Peter Siddell

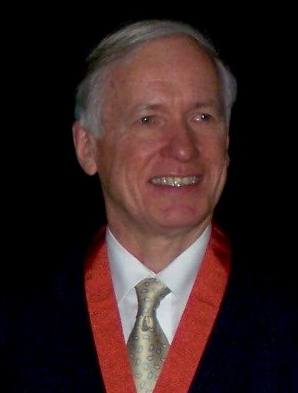
Sir David Skegg

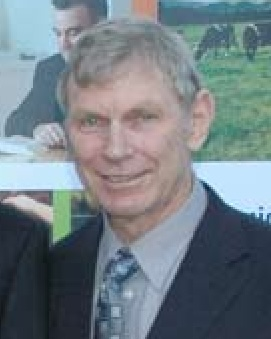
Sir Peter Snell

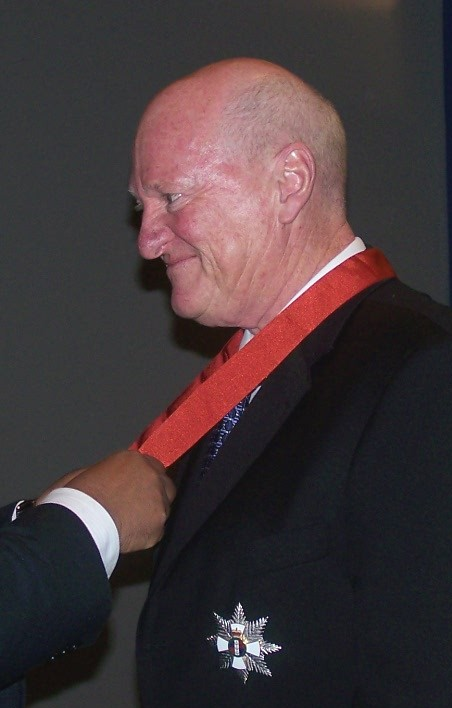
Sir Ken Stevens

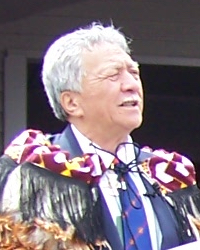
Sir Archie Taiaroa

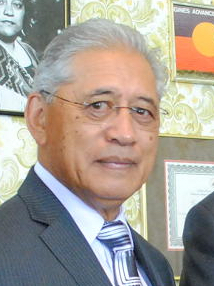
Sir Tumu Te Heuheu

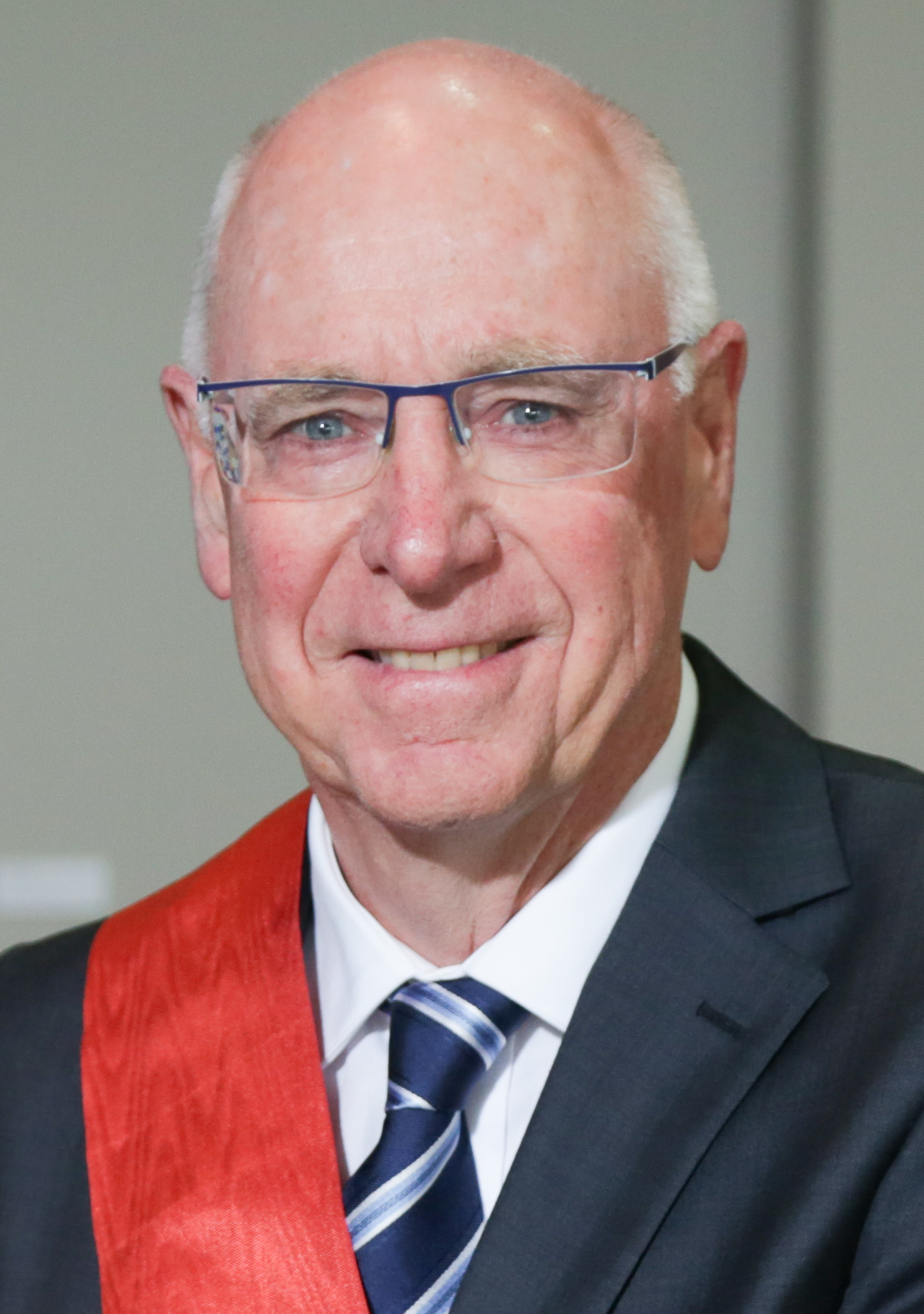
Sir Stephen Tindall

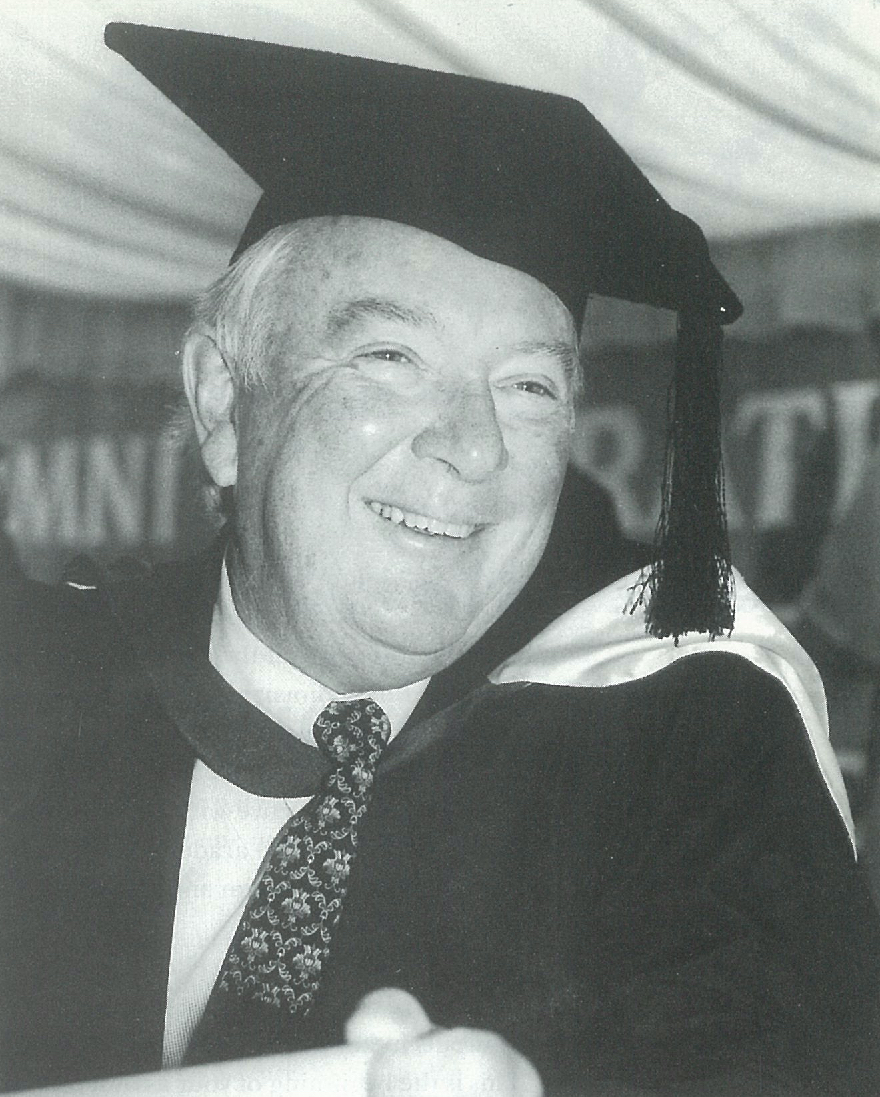
Sir Peter Trapski

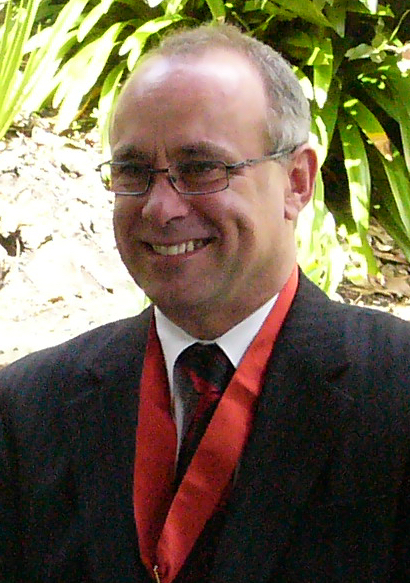
Sir Henry van der Heyden

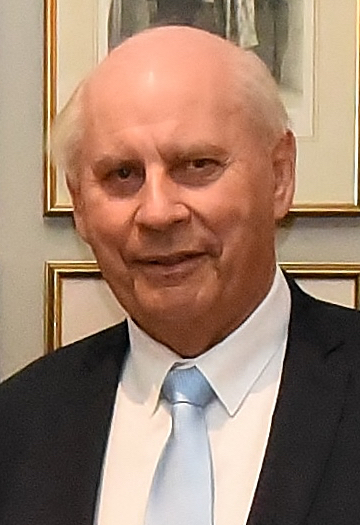
Sir John Wells

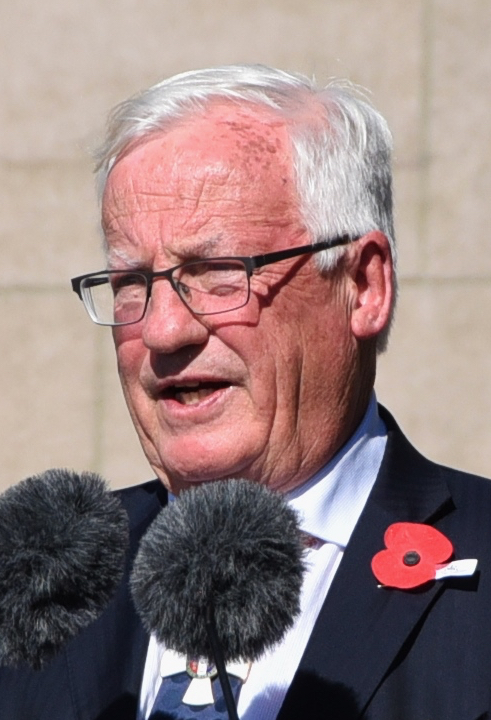
Sir William Young

=== Widows of Principal and Distinguished Companions ===
The following surviving spouses of deceased Principal and Distinguished Companions were granted the use of the courtesy title of "Lady":

- Olive Doreen Hutchins – of Queenstown (spouse of the late Leslie Hutchins DCNZM OBE JP).
- Elaine Ivy James – of Hamilton (spouse of the late Oswald George James DCNZM OBE).
- Doris Parekohe Vercoe – of Rotorua (spouse of the late Right Reverend Te Whakahuihui Vercoe PCNZM MBE).
