= Forrest Miller =

New Zealand judge (born 1956)

The Honourable Forrest Miller

Justice of the Supreme Court
- In office 19 December 2023 – 15 July 2026

Justice of the Court of Appeal
- In office 20 June 2013 – 19 December 2023

Personal details
- Born: 1956 (age 69–70) South Otago, New Zealand
- Education: University of Otago; University of Toronto

Forrest "Forrie" Miller (born 1956) is a New Zealand lawyer and judge. He was a judge of the Supreme Court of New Zealand from December 2023 to July 2026.

== Early life and education ==
Miller was born in South Otago. He gained a Bachelor of Arts in history in 1978, and a Bachelor of Laws with Honours in 1981, both from the University of Otago. He later earned a Master of Laws degree at the University of Toronto in 1997.

== Legal career ==
Miller was admitted to the bar in 1981 and worked for a legal firm in Alexandra. He joined Chapman Tripp in 1984, becoming a partner in 1987. He worked in a variety of areas of the law, including regulatory and competition law, commercial law, and public law litigation, specialising in securities. He remained at Chapman Tripp until his appointment to the bench of the High Court of New Zealand in 2004. In 2013, he was elevated to the Court of Appeal.

On 19 December 2023, Miller was appointed a judge of the Supreme Court of New Zealand. On 17 June 2026, he was granted retention of the title The Honourable for life, in recognition of his service as a judge of the Supreme Court, Court of Appeal and High Court.

== Awards and honours ==
In 2019, Miller was awarded an honorary Doctorate of Laws by his alma mater, the University of Otago.
