= Supreme Court of New Zealand =

Highest court in New Zealand

- Te Kōti Mana Nui (Māori)
- Coat of arms of New Zealand

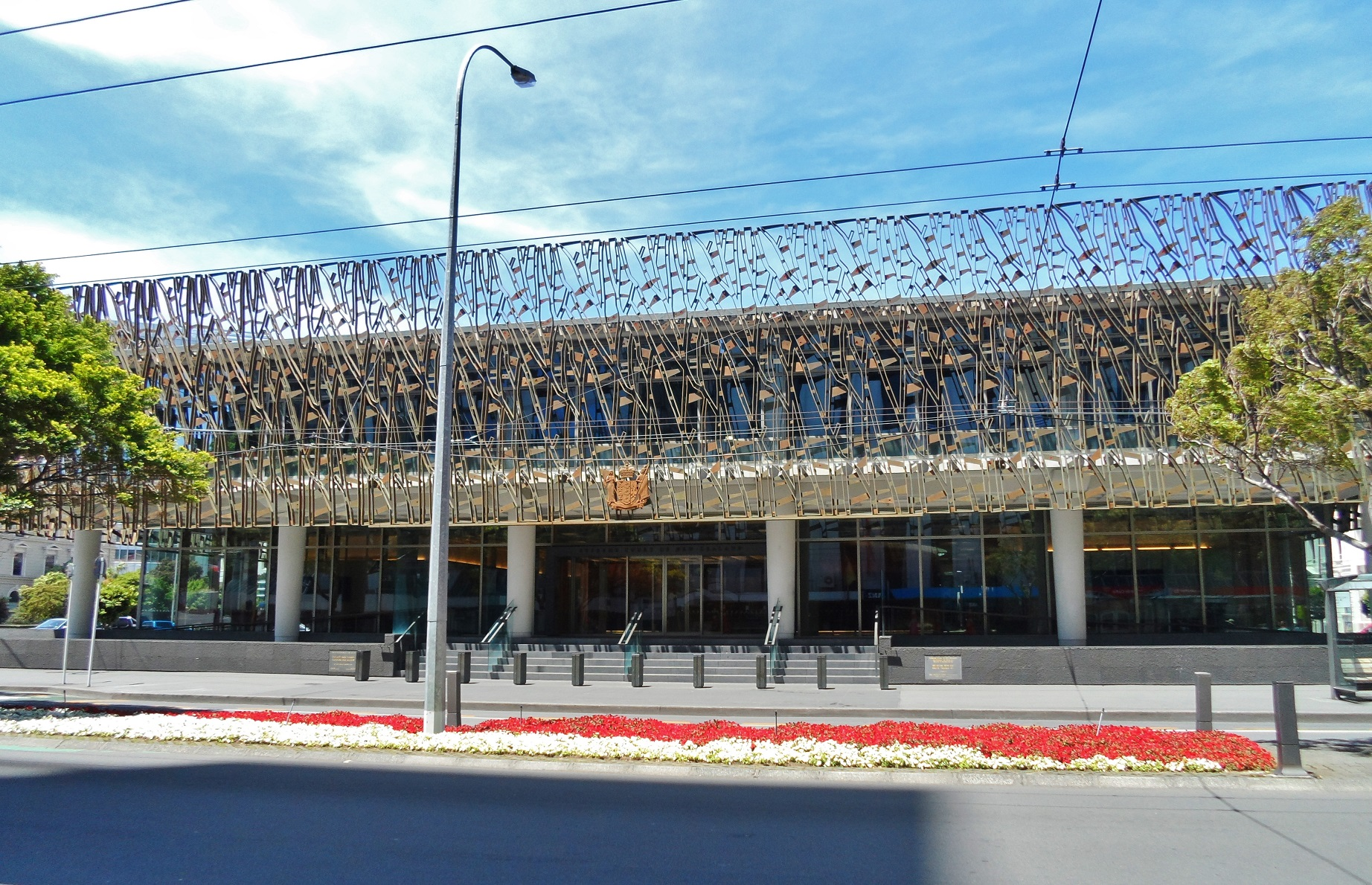
- Entrance to Supreme Court building in Wellington
- Interactive map of Supreme Court of New Zealand
- Established: 1 January 2004
- Jurisdiction: New Zealand
- Location: 85 Lambton Quay, Wellington, New Zealand
- Composition method: Appointed by the Governor-General on behalf of King Charles III on the advice of the Prime Minister (chief justice) and Attorney-General (justices)
- Authorised by: Senior Courts Act 2016
- Judge term length: Retire at age of 70 years (Senior Courts Act 2016, s 133)
- Number of positions: 6
- Website: www.courtsofnz.govt.nz/the-courts/supreme-court/

Chief Justice
- Currently: Dame Helen Winkelmann
- Since: 14 March 2019

The Supreme Court of New Zealand (Māori: Te Kōti Mana Nui, lit. 'Court of Great Mana') is the highest court and the court of last resort of New Zealand. It formally came into being on 1 January 2004 and sat for the first time on 1 July 2004. It replaced the right of appeal to the Judicial Committee of the Privy Council, based in London. It was created with the passing of the Supreme Court Act 2003, on 15 October 2003. At the time, the creation of the Supreme Court and the abolition of appeals to the Privy Council were controversial constitutional changes in New Zealand. The Supreme Court Act 2003 was repealed on 1 March 2017 and superseded by the Senior Courts Act 2016.

The current Supreme Court should not be confused with the High Court of New Zealand, which was known as the Supreme Court until 1980. The High Court, New Zealand's superior court, was established in 1841 as the “Supreme Court of New Zealand”. Its name was changed in anticipation of the eventual creation of this final court of appeal within New Zealand.

== Composition ==
The inaugural members of the Supreme Court comprised the chief justice, Dame Sian Elias, together with the four most senior judges of the New Zealand Court of Appeal at the time: Justices Gault, Keith, Blanchard and Tipping. The maximum number of permanent Judges of the Supreme Court was initially five, but increased to six in 2005 with the appointment of then Court of Appeal judge Sir John McGrath. On 21 February 2006, the Honourable Sir Noel Anderson (at the time President of the Court of Appeal) was appointed to the Supreme Court, continuing the practice of appointing the next most senior Court of Appeal judge.

Several acting judges have been appointed since the Supreme Court began. These judges were initially appointed from the ranks of retired judges of the Court of Appeal and included Justices Sir John Henry, Sir Ted Thomas, former President of the Court of Appeal Sir Ivor Richardson and former Chief Justice Sir Thomas Eichelbaum. More recent practice has been for retired Supreme Court Judges to be appointed as Acting Judges. Acting judges can only sit on substantive appeals, as the Senior Courts Act requires at least two permanent members of the Court to determine applications for leave. The Chief Justice can also second a Court of Appeal judge to the Supreme Court for one or more particular appeals.

=== Eligibility to be a justice of the Supreme Court ===
An existing judge can only be appointed a Supreme Court justice if already a member of the Court of Appeal or the High Court. If the person is not a member of either of those courts, the candidate must be appointed as a High Court judge at the same time as taking office in the Supreme Court.

A judge of the Supreme Court continues as a judge of the High Court in a technical sense, but ceases to be a judge of the Court of Appeal if they were a member of that court.

A judge of one of the seniors courts in New Zealand must retire on attaining the age of 70 years but is eligible for appointment as an acting judge up until the age of 75.

== Creation ==
While the suggestion of ending appeals to the Privy Council had been around since the Statute of Westminster Adoption Act 1947, proposals to end appeals to the Privy Council began in the late 1970s, when a Royal Commission on the judiciary canvassed arguments for replacing the Privy Council. In the early 1980s, Minister of Justice Jim McLay suggested their abolition. Proposals for an indigenous final appellate court can be traced back to 1985. In 1996, Attorney-General Paul East proposed to end the status of the Privy Council as the country's highest court of appeal. The proposal got as far as a bill being introduced into Parliament. However, this bill met with little support from within the National Party, and the bill was not carried over by the next Parliament following the 1996 general election.

The policy was resurrected in 1999 by the Fifth Labour Government. In the 1999 general election, the Labour Party campaigned for a domestic Supreme Court. In a discussion paper issued the following year, Attorney-General Margaret Wilson identified the rationales as sovereignty and responsiveness to New Zealand values and needs:

Ending the right of appeal to the Privy Council represents an important next stage in the development of our national independence. It provides us with an opportunity to create an indigenous justice system, which truly represents our values and meets our needs. Our focus must be on an inclusive and enduring appeal structure that will provide access to justice for all New Zealanders.

A year later a Ministerial Action Group was formed to assist Ministers in designing the purpose, structure and make-up of a final court of appeal. The Group's report, Replacing the Privy Council: A New Supreme Court was published in April 2002, before the general election a few months later.

On 9 December 2002, after the Labour government's re-election at the 2002 general election, Attorney-General Margaret Wilson introduced the Supreme Court Bill to create the Supreme Court and abolish appeals to the Privy Council. A Campaign for the Privy Council was established to lobby against the abolition of appeals. Many business and community groups joined the opposition to the ending of appeals. The Monarchist League of New Zealand opposed the abolition of appeals, stating:

Most lawyers are opposed to the abolition of appeals to the Privy Council, and doubtless will continue to do so until a more satisfactory justification is given for the abandonment of a tribunal which costs the New Zealand taxpayer nothing, and which gives us access to some of the finest legal minds in the common law world. Many Maori also see this proposal as a retrograde step, both by removing an impartial tribunal to which they have hitherto been able to appeal, and by cutting another link with the Crown.

Margaret Wilson argued in favour of the bill, stating:

When reviewing the legal needs of the community appeals to the Privy Council seemed increasingly anomalous. It was anomalous because of the narrow range of cases that actually were appealed to the Privy Council. The Privy Council itself recognised that some cases it considered were better settled by a New Zealand court and referred back for decision. Its precedent value was therefore quite limited. Few cases got to the Privy Council because of the costs involved, and because in some areas, such as employment and environment law, the statutes barred such appeals.

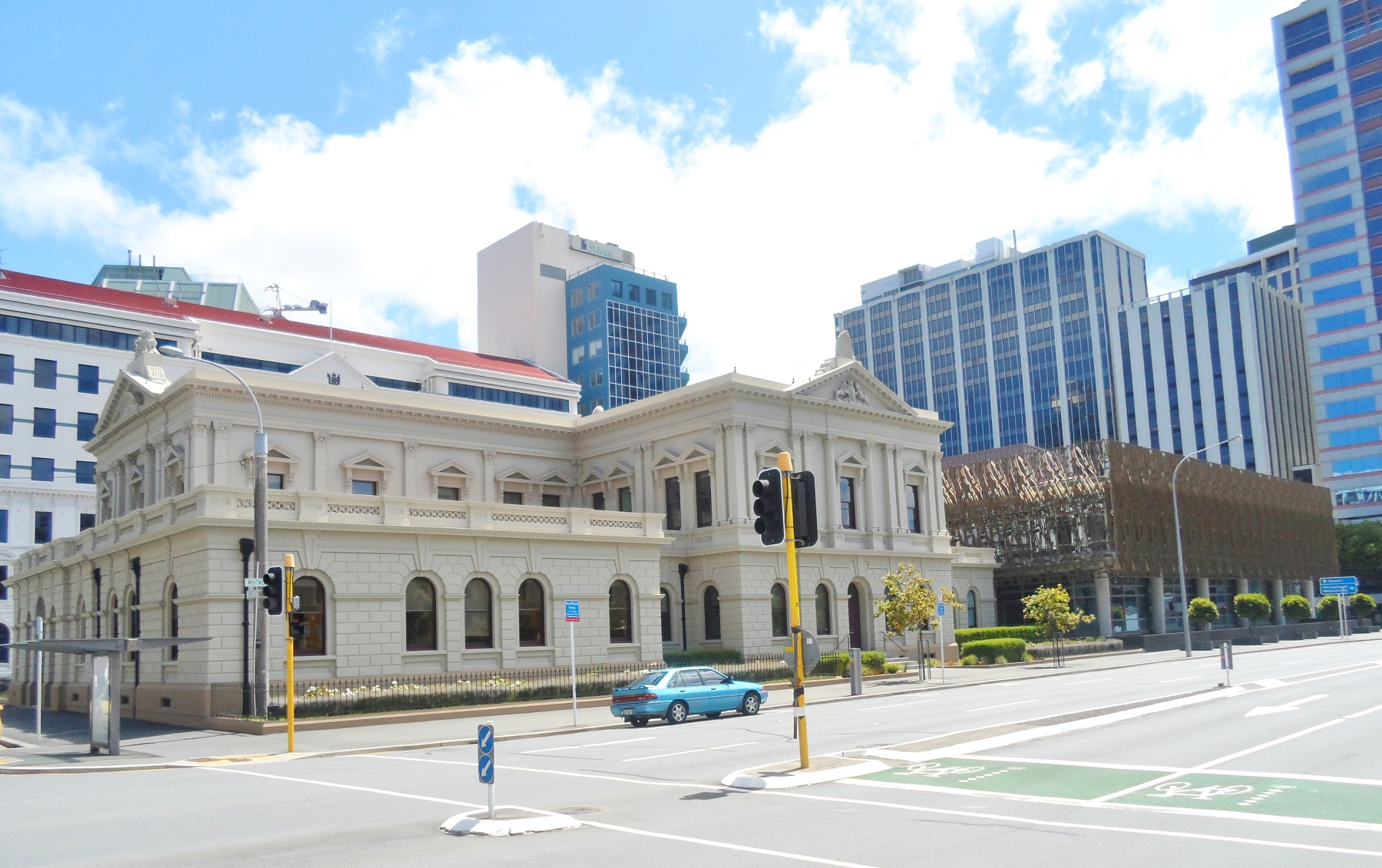
Old High Court and Supreme Court of New Zealand in Wellington in 2015.

=== Select committee ===
At select committee, the bill attracted numerous submissions for and against creating the Supreme Court. Notable supporters of the Supreme Court were former President of the Court of Appeal, Lord of Appeal in Ordinary, and Privy Councillor Lord Cooke of Thorndon and former Prime Minister Sir Geoffrey Palmer, while most senior lawyers were opposed to the change. The Monarchist League complained the majority of members of the select committee were motivated by a "republican agenda".

Opposition parties had called unsuccessfully for a national referendum on the creation of the Supreme Court. While the bill was before the select committee, Auckland lawyer Dennis J Gates launched a petition for a non-binding citizens initiated referendum on 3 April 2003, asking the question "Should all rights of appeal to the Privy Council be abolished?". The petition failed to gain the 310,000 signatures of registered electors needed and lapsed on 2 July 2004.

=== Third reading ===
The Supreme Court Bill passed its third reading 63 to 53. The governing Labour and Progressive parties, supported by the Greens, voted in favour, while the National, New Zealand First, ACT New Zealand, and United Future parties voted against. It received Royal Assent on 17 October 2003, with commencement on 1 January 2004.

=== Later changes ===
In 2008, National leader John Key (then the leader of the opposition) ruled out any abolition of the Supreme Court and return to the Privy Council. The Key Government eventually repealed the Supreme Court Act 2003 and replaced it with the Senior Courts Act 2016, as part of a modernisation of judicature legislation. The reform was supported by National, Labour, the Greens, the Māori Party, ACT and United Future, and was opposed by New Zealand First.

=== Appointments ===
One issue that was particularly contentious as the bill was being debated in Parliament was the appointment of judges to the court, with opposition parties claiming that the Attorney-General would make partisan choices. These concerns were because the entire bench was to be appointed simultaneously, and no clear statement had been made about how they would be selected. However, the level of concern was considerably lessened when Wilson announced that the appointments would be based on merit and seniority. Appointments to the court were expected and unsurprising. The most senior justices on the Court of Appeal were appointed to the new court.

== Cases ==
One of the grounds advanced for the creation of the court was that it would allow more people to have access to the country's highest appellate court. From 1851 until 2002, the Judicial Committee of the Privy Council made 268 decisions relating to New Zealand. In the ten years from 1992–2002, only 21 decisions had been allowed with respect to New Zealand. The Supreme Court hears many more cases than were heard by the Privy Council due to its jurisdiction being considerably broader. For example, cases in the areas of employment, criminal and family law can be heard by the Supreme Court, whereas previously cases in these areas of law could normally progress no further than the Court of Appeal. The proximity of the court is another factor that is likely to contribute to it hearing an increased number of appeals and also allows appeals to be heard and determined considerably faster than under the former system.

The court has heard many applications for leave. It has also heard many substantive appeals. Notable substantive cases include:

- Morgan v Superintendent of Rimutaka Prison [2005] 3 NZLR 1 (retrospective penalties).
- Bryson v Three Foot Six Ltd [2005] NZSC 34 (determination of employee or contractor status).
- Zaoui v Attorney-General (No 2) [2006] 1 NZLR 289 (human rights of refugees in relation to national security).
- R v L [2006] 3 NZLR 291 (mens rea of attempted sexual violation).
- Brooker v Police [2007] NZSC 30 (test for disorderly behaviour under section 4(1)(a) of the Summary Offences Act 1981.)
- Lai v Chamberlains [2007] 2 NZLR 7 (immunity of barristers from suit).
- Taunoa v Attorney-General [2008] 1 NZLR 429 (remedies for Bill of Rights breach).
- R v Hansen [2007] 3 NZLR 1 (burden of proof and evidential burden under Misuse of Drugs Act 1975 in relation to Bill of Rights).
- Mahomed v R [2011] NZSC 52 (admissibility of propensity evidence in criminal prosecutions).
- Hamed & Ors. v R [2011] NZSC 101 (admissibility of video surveillance obtained during criminal trespass).
- Taueki v R [2013] NZSC 146 (meaning of the phrase "in peaceable possession" as it relates to the Crimes Act 1961),
- Environmental Defence Society v New Zealand King Salmon [2014] NZSC 38 (interpretation of the Resource Management Act).
- Paki v Attorney-General (No 2) [2014] NZSC 118 (usque ad medium filum aquae only applies where consistent with Maori custom)
- Booth v R [2016] NZSC 127, [2017] 1 NZLR 223 (determination of correct calculation for prisoner release dates)
- New Health New Zealand Incorporated v South Taranaki District Council [2018] NZSC 59, [2018] NZSC 60 (legality of water fluoridation)
- Peter Hugh McGregor Ellis v The King [2022] NZSC 114 (overturning of Ellis' conviction)
- Make It 16 Incorporated v Attorney-General [2022] NZSC 134 (the minimum voting age of 18 years is inconsistent with the New Zealand Bill of Rights Act 1990)

== Building ==
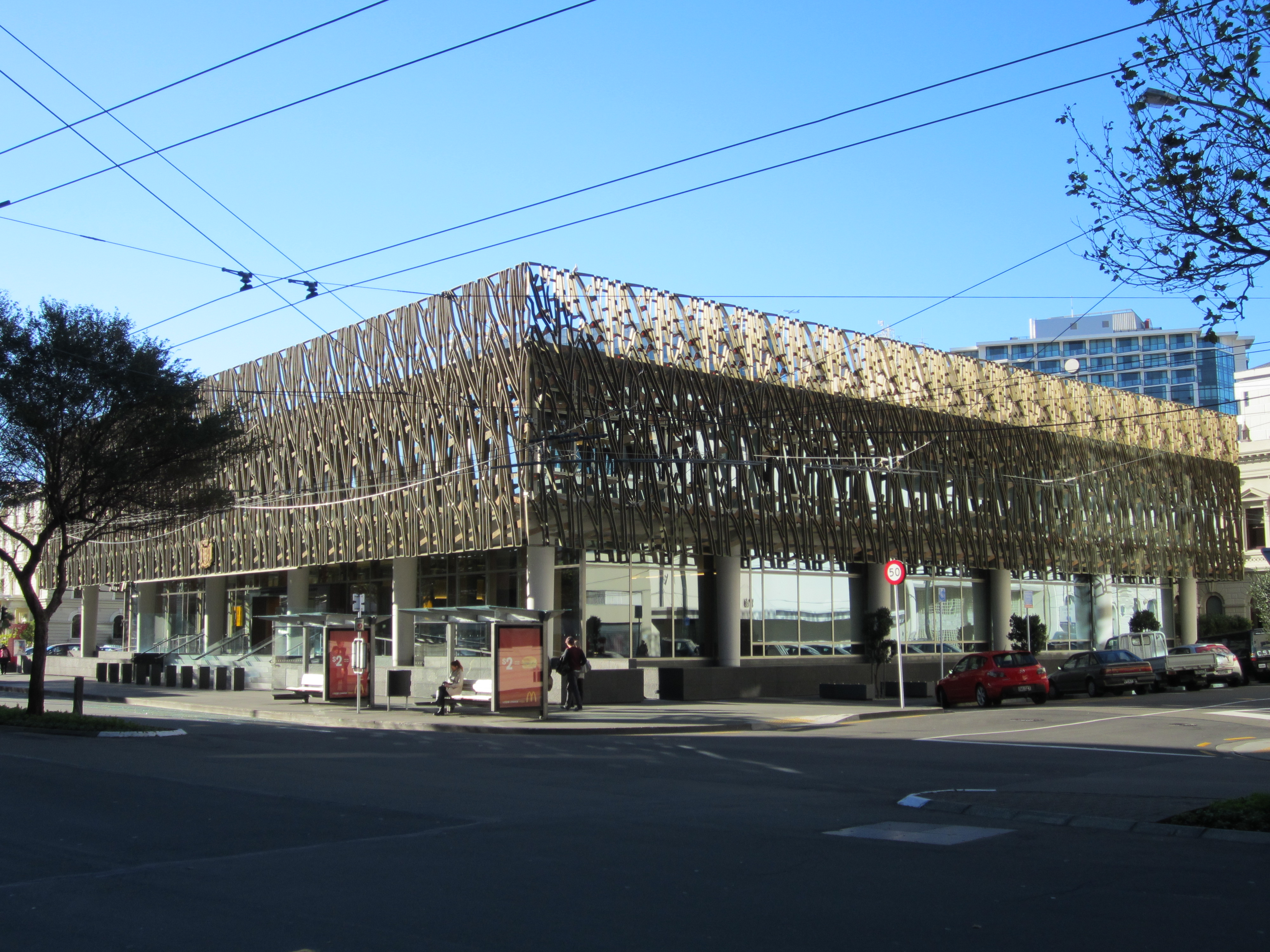
The Supreme Court building in Wellington

The Supreme Court sits in Wellington. Until the court's new $80.7 million home was built—beside and expanding into the historic High Court building—the court was housed in temporary facilities located in the High Court in Wellington with offices located in Old Government Buildings. The building was formally opened on 18 January 2010 by Prince William.

The upper portion of the building's exterior is surrounded by a bronze screen and red glass facade. The forms were inspired by the intertwining of rātā and pōhutukawa trees. The interior follows a similar theme; the court room is oval shaped with tiled walls mimicking the shape of a kauri cone.

== Leave ==
Unlike final appellate courts in some other countries, there is no automatic right of appeal to the Supreme Court of New Zealand. All appeals are by leave granted by the Supreme Court. No lower courts may grant leave to appeal. Leave is granted or declined based on a number of factors listed in section 74 of the Senior Courts Act, with the overarching principle being that it must be necessary in the interests of justice for the court to hear the appeal. Leave applications may be determined by any two permanent judges of the court based on the written submissions of the parties without an oral hearing; however, they are normally determined by a panel of three. The judges determining the application can decide to hold an oral hearing if they wish.

This system is also in place in the United Kingdom where the Supreme Court of the United Kingdom, the highest court of appeal in the United Kingdom, also must grant leave for appeal for cases to be heard before it. The same is true for appeals to the Court of Final Appeal of Hong Kong. Similarly, most litigants seeking to appeal to the Constitutional Court of South Africa, Supreme Court of the United States, Supreme Court of Canada or High Court of Australia require leave before their case can be heard – although there are some exceptions to this in the latter three courts.

== Comparison to the Privy Council and criticism ==
Since its foundation, the Supreme Court has been subject to "unprecedented public criticism". The quality of several Supreme Court judgments have been criticised in New Zealand and overseas, and concerns expressed about the impact on the country's case law and international reputation. The major criticisms are the Supreme Court's lack of experience and its membership being drawn initially from the Court of Appeal. Defenders of the court argue that it has provided easier access to the courts. They also note that the argument that the court would not be independent has been disproved by the Supreme Court's willingness to overrule decisions of the Court of Appeal.

Prior to discontinuation, the Privy Council heard up to 12 cases from New Zealand a year. From its creation through May 2012, the Supreme Court heard an average of 29 substantive appeals annually.

== Judges ==
=== Current permanent judges ===
	Judge	Portrait	Took office	Mandatory retirement
1	Chief Justice Dame Helen Winkelmann		14 March 2019	2032
2	Justice Dame Ellen France		22 July 2016	2027
3	Justice Sir Joe Williams		2 May 2019	2031
4	Justice Sir Stephen Kós		22 April 2022	22 January 2029
5	Justice Francis Cooke		9 February 2026	2035
6	Justice Neil Campbell		16 July 2026	14 April 2038

In addition, Dame Susan Glazebrook holds a warrant as an Acting Judge of the Supreme Court from 9 February 2026 until 8 February 2028 having previously been a permanent Judge up until her retirement on 8 February 2026.

=== Former judges ===
Judge	Portrait	Took office	Left office
Dame Sian Elias GNZM KC, former Chief Justice		1 January 2004	12 March 2019
Sir Thomas Gault KNZM QC		1 January 2004	8 April 2006
Sir Kenneth Keith ONZ KBE KC		1 January 2004	18 November 2005
Sir Peter Blanchard KNZM PC		1 January 2004	24 June 2012
Sir Andrew Tipping KNZM		1 January 2004	21 August 2012
Sir John McGrath KNZM QC		3 May 2005	9 March 2015
Sir Noel Anderson KNZM QC		16 February 2006	5 May 2008
Bill Wilson KC		1 February 2008	5 November 2010
Sir William Young KNZM KC		1 July 2010	13 April 2022
Sir Robert Chambers KNZM QC		1 February 2012	21 May 2013
Dame Susan Glazebrook DNZM		6 August 2012	8 February 2026
Sir Terence Arnold KNZM KC		10 June 2013	12 April 2017
Sir Mark O'Regan KNZM		1 September 2014	29 November 2023
Forrest Miller		20 December 2023	15 July 2026

== See also ==
- Judiciary of New Zealand
- Constitution of New Zealand
