= William Young (judge) =

New Zealand judge (born 1952)

The Honourable Sir William Young KNZM KC
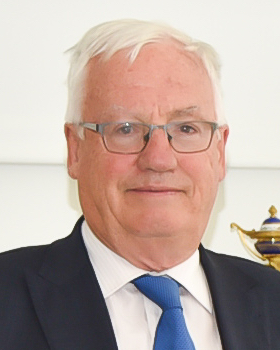
- Young in 2020

Non-Permanent Judge of the Court of Final Appeal of Hong Kong
- Incumbent
- Assumed office 23 June 2025

Justice of the Dubai International Financial Centre Courts
- In office 27 July 2022 – 9 August 2022
- Succeeded by: Stephen Kós

Justice of the Supreme Court
- In office 1 July 2010 – 14 April 2022

President of the Court of Appeal
- In office 2006–2010
- Preceded by: Sir Noel Anderson
- Succeeded by: Mark O'Regan

Personal details
- Born: 14 April 1952 (age 74) Christchurch, New Zealand
- Spouse: Susan Mary Young (m. 1979)
- Relations: Neville Young (brother)
- Education: University of Canterbury; University of Cambridge

Sir William Gillow Gibbes Austen Young KNZM KC (born 14 April 1952) is a former judge of the New Zealand Supreme Court, and a non-permanent judge of the Court of Final Appeal of Hong Kong and other international courts.

He served on the New Zealand Court of Appeal from 2004 to 2010, including as president from 2006. In 2010, he joined the Supreme Court of New Zealand. After retiring in 2022, Young has accepted appointments to international courts, including the Hong Kong Court of Final Appeal in 2025.

== Early life, family, and early career ==
Born in Christchurch on 14 April 1952, Young was educated at Christ's College, University of Canterbury (LLB (Hons) in 1974) and University of Cambridge (PhD in 1979) in the United Kingdom with a thesis Duress and abuse of inequality of bargaining position. In 1979, he and his wife, Susan, were married, and they went on to have three children.

After obtaining his PhD, Young worked in the Christchurch law firm R A Young Hunter & Co, before moving to the independent bar to become a barrister sole in 1988. Young was made a Queen's Counsel in 1991 and acted in several high-profile cases, including the Winebox Inquiry of the 1990s.

== Judge ==
Young was appointed a High Court Judge in Christchurch in 1997, a Court of Appeal Judge when the Supreme Court was created in 2004, and to the position of President of the Court of Appeal in January 2006. Sitting on the Court of Appeal, Young in 2006 in R v Wanhalla described model jury directions in a criminal trial on the standard of proof required.

In the 2007 Queen's Birthday Honours, Young was appointed a Distinguished Companion of the New Zealand Order of Merit, for services as president of the Court of Appeal. In 2009, following the restoration of titular honours by the New Zealand government, he accepted redesignation as a Knight Companion. In 2013, he was awarded an honorary doctorate in laws from the University of Canterbury.

Young was appointed a Judge of the Supreme Court with effect from 1 July 2010. During his tenure he chaired from 2019 to 2020 the Royal Commission of Inquiry into the Christchurch mosque shootings. He remained a permanent member of the Supreme Court until 2022. Thereafter he sat as an acting judge of the Supreme Court until 2024. On 3 April 2024, Young was granted retention of the title The Honourable, in recognition of his service as a judge of the Supreme Court, Court of Appeal and High Court.

Following his retirement from the New Zealand Supreme Court, Young has accepted five international judicial appointments. He was appointed a judge of the Dubai International Financial Centre Courts in July 2022, but resigned less than a month later citing the risk of 'adverse perceptions' in light of concerns raised by human rights campaigners about foreign judicial appointments allegedly being used to legitimise the United Arab Emirates political regime. In August 2022 he was appointed an ad-hoc justice in the Court of Appeal of the Seychelles. On 7 November 2022 he was sworn in as a judge of the Court of Appeal of Samoa. In October 2023 he was sworn to the Supreme Court of Fiji. On 8 May 2025, the Hong Kong government announced that Young would join the Hong Kong Court of Final Appeal as a foreign non-permanent judge after receiving the endorsement of the Legislative Council of Hong Kong.

== Non-judicial involvement ==
While a barrister, Young was involved with the New Zealand Law Society educational programme and, since appointment to the bench, with the Institute of Judicial Studies, being the primary author of its Criminal Jury Trials Bench Book. He wrote "Summing Up to Juries – What Jury Research says about Current Rules and Practice" [2003] Crim LR 665 and co-authored a chapter in Witness Testimony: Psychological, Investigative and Evidential Perspectives (Oxford University Press 26 October 2006).
