= Susan Glazebrook =

New Zealand lawyer and jurist

The Honourable Dame Susan Glazebrook DNZM
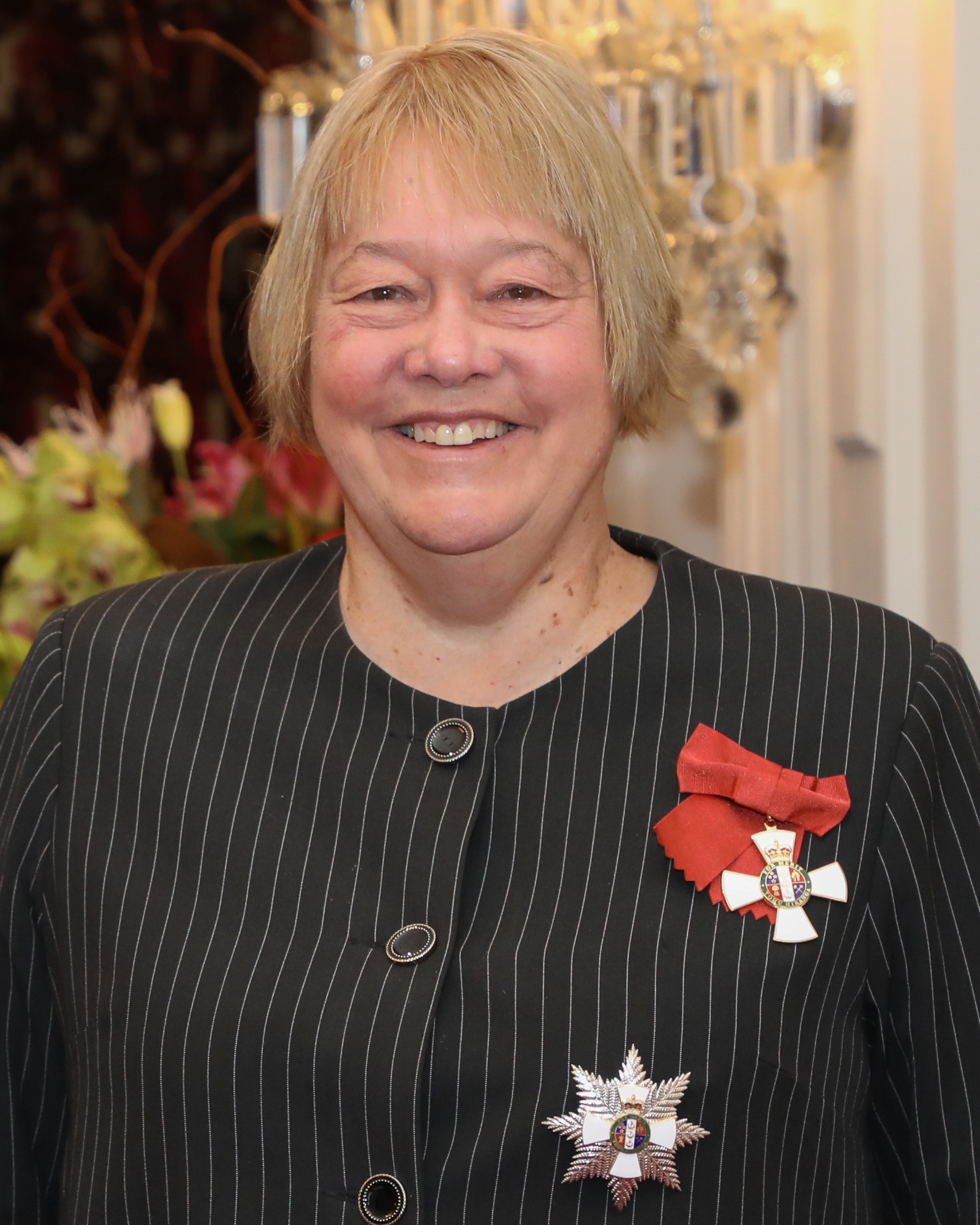
- Glazebrook in 2022

Justice of the Supreme Court
- In office 6 August 2012 – 8 February 2026
- Preceded by: Sir Peter Blanchard

Justice of the Court of Appeal
- In office 24 May 2002 – 6 August 2012

Personal details
- Born: 8 February 1956 (age 70) Bowdon, Cheshire, England
- Spouse: Greg Kane (m. 1992)
- Education: University of Auckland; University of Oxford

Dame Susan Gwynfa Mary Glazebrook DNZM (born 8 February 1956) is a former judge of the Supreme Court of New Zealand.

== Early life, family and education ==
Born in Bowdon, Cheshire, England, on 8 February 1956, Glazebrook emigrated to New Zealand with her family in 1962, and she became a naturalised New Zealand citizen in 1978. She was educated at Tauranga Girls' College, before going on to study at the University of Auckland, where she gained a Bachelor of Arts in 1975, a Master of Arts with first-class honours in history in 1978, and an LLB(Hons) in 1980. She later completed a DipBus (Finance) at the same institution in 1994. In 1988, Glazebrook obtained a DPhil from the University of Oxford in French legal history; her doctoral thesis was titled Justice in transition: crime, criminals and criminal justice in revolutionary Rouen, 1790–1800.

In 1992, Glazebrook married former New Zealand rugby union representative Greg Kane, and the couple went on to have two children together.

== Career ==
Glazebrook worked as a junior lecturer in history at the University of Auckland in 1976, 1978 and 1979. Between 1981 and 1983, she was based in Rouen, France, where she worked with a government-funded body responsible for the resettlement of refugees in France. In 1984, she was a research assistant under Sir Keith Sinclair and a tutor in history at the University of Auckland. She was a part-time lecturer in commercial law at Auckland from 1991 to 1994.

Glazebrook joined legal firm Simpson Grierson in 1986, and became a partner in 1988. She was a member of various commercial boards and government advisory committees, and served as president of the Inter-Pacific Bar Association, in 1998.

Glazebrook was appointed a judge of the High Court of New Zealand on 14 December 2000, having served until that time as temporary judge of that court. She was appointed to the Court of Appeal on 24 May 2002.

On 6 August 2012, Glazebrook was appointed to the Supreme Court. She retired as a judge on 8 February 2026.

Glazebrook acted as administrator of the government on several occasions, including while the governor-general, Dame Cindy Kiro, was in Britain attending the funeral of Queen Elizabeth II.

== Honours and awards ==
In the 2014 Queen's Birthday Honours, Glazebrook was appointed a Dame Companion of the New Zealand Order of Merit, for services to the judiciary. On 11 December 2025, she was granted retention of the title The Honourable, in recognition of her service as a judge of the Supreme Court, Court of Appeal, and High Court.
