= John McGrath (judge) =

New Zealand judge (1945–2018)

The Honourable Sir John McGrath KNZM QC

Justice of the Supreme Court
- In office 2005–2015

Solicitor-General of New Zealand
- In office 1989–2000
- Prime Minister: David Lange, Geoffrey Palmer, Mike Moore, Jim Bolger, Jenny Shipley, Helen Clark
- Preceded by: Paul Neazor
- Succeeded by: Terence Arnold

Personal details
- Born: John Joseph McGrath; 10 March 1945 Wellington, New Zealand
- Died: 19 October 2018 (aged 73) Wellington, New Zealand
- Spouse: Christine Anne Swallow
- Relations: Denis McGrath (father)

Sir John Joseph McGrath KNZM QC (10 March 1945 – 19 October 2018) was a judge of the Supreme Court of New Zealand, serving in that role from 2005 until 2015. He was also a judge of the Court of Appeal from 2000 to 2005, and the Solicitor-General of New Zealand from 1989 to 2000.

== Career ==
Born in Wellington, McGrath attended Wanganui Collegiate School and graduated with an LL.M. from Victoria University of Wellington in 1968. He was a partner in Buddle Findlay, in Wellington, until he moved to the separate bar in 1984. He became Queen's Counsel in 1987 and he was Solicitor-General between 1989 and 2000. McGrath was appointed to the Court of Appeal in July 2000 and to the Supreme Court in May 2005. In the 2007 New Year Honours, he was appointed a Distinguished Companion of the New Zealand Order of Merit, for services to the Appeal and Supreme Courts. In 2009, following the re-introduction of titular honours by the New Zealand government, McGrath accepted redesignation as a Knight Companion of the New Zealand Order of Merit. McGrath died in Wellington on 19 October 2018 at the age of 73.

== Sources ==
- National Business Review, Arise Sir... or Dame... for 70 on honours list, by Nevil Gibson, 1 August 2009 (accessed 8:17PM 1 November 2009)
- kiwisfirst.co.nz Profile
- Hon Justice McGrath, Final Sitting Speech, Friday 6 March 2015 (Retrieved 13 March 2015)
