= List of cases of the Supreme Court of New Zealand =

This is a list of the substantive decisions of the Supreme Court of New Zealand. It is organised in order of the date the case was handed down.

== 2004 ==
- Prebble v Huata
- Zaoui v Attorney-General
- Siloata v R

== 2005 ==
- Otago Stations Estates Ltd V Parker
- Timoti v R
- Bryson v Three Foot Six Ltd
- Hemmes v Young
- Westfield (New Zealand) Ltd v North Shore City Council
- Morgan v Superintendent, Rimutaka Prison
- Mist v R
- Bharamitash v Kumar
- Trans Otway v Shephard and Dunphy

== 2006 ==
- Thompson v R
- Casata Ltd v General Distributors Ltd
- L v R
- Telecom Mobile Ltd v Commerce Commission
- Peter Portable Sawing Systems Ltd (in liq) v Lucas
- Allen v Commissioner of Inland Revenue
- Felton v Johnson
- Mafart and Prieur v Television New Zealand Ltd
- Eastern Services Ltd v No 68 Ltd
- C v Complaints Assessment Committee
- Condon v R
- Shirley v Wairarapa District Health Board
- Steele and Roberts v Serepisos
- Chirnside v Fay
- Chamberlains v Lai
- Secretary for Justice (as the New Zealand Central Authority on behalf of T J) v H
- Henkel KgaA v Holdfast New Zealand Ltd
- Taylor v Jones
- AMP General Insurance Ltd v Bodkins
- Gilchrist v R
- Waitakere City Council v Estates Homes Ltd
- Walsh v R
- Zaoui v Attorney-General (No 2)

== 2007 ==
- Hansen v R
- Paper Reclaim Ltd v Aotearoa International Ltd
- Trustees Executors Ltd v Murray
- Brooker v Police
- Wholesale Distributors Ltd v Gibbons Holdings Ltd
- Commerce Commission v Fonterra Co-Operative Group Ltd
- Larsen v Rick Dees Ltd
- Maruha Corp and Maruha (NZ) Ltd v Amaltal Corp Ltd
- Jiang v R
- Arbuthnot v Chief Executive of the Department of Work and Income
- Royal New Zealand Foundation of the Blind v Auckland City Council
- Southbourne Investments Ltd v Greenmount Manufacturing Ltd
- Rajamani v R
- Taunoa v Attorney-General
- Unison Networks Ltd v Commerce Commission
- Reid v R
- New Zealand Airline Pilots' Assoc Industrial Union of Workers Inc v Air New Zealand Ltd
- Rogers v Television New Zealand Ltd
- Owen v R
- Austin Nichols & Co Inc v Stichting Lodestar
- Ngan v R
- Lai v Chamberlains

== 2008 ==
- Hayes v R
- Dollars & Sense Finance Ltd v Nathan
- Westpac Banking Corp v Commissioner of Inland Revenue
- Taunoa v Attorney-General

== 2011 ==
- Mahomed v R
- Hamed & Ors. v R
- Penny and Hooper v Commissioner of Inland Revenue

== 2013 ==
- Taueki v R

== 2014 ==
- Environmental Defence Society v New Zealand King Salmon
- Paki v Attorney-General (No 2)

== 2016 ==
- Booth v R

== 2018 ==
- New Health New Zealand Incorporated v South Taranaki District Council

== 2022 ==
- Peter Hugh McGregor Ellis v The King
- Make It 16 Incorporated v Attorney-General (the minimum voting age of 18 years is inconsistent with the New Zealand Bill of Rights Act 1990)

== 2025 ==
- Halse v Rangiura Trust Board
- J, Compulsory Care Recipient, by his welfare guardian, T v Attorney-General & Others
- Whakatōhea Kotahitanga Waka (Edwards) v Ngāti Ira o Waioweka, Ngāti Patumoana, Ngāti Ruatākenga and Ngāi Tamahaua (Te Kāhui Takutai Moana o Ngā Whānau Me Ngā Hapū o Te Whakatōhea)
