= Video Camera Surveillance (Temporary Measures) Act 2011 =

Act of Parliament in New Zealand

New Zealand Parliament
- Royal assent: 17 October 2011
- Commenced: 18 October 2011

Legislative history
- Introduced by: Chris Finlayson
- Passed: 6 October 2011
- Status: Current legislation

The Video Camera Surveillance (Temporary Measures) Act 2011 is an act of Parliament passed in New Zealand in 2011. The law is a response to the Supreme Court's ruling in Hamed & Ors v. R, and is intended to legalise surveillance ruled unlawful by the courts.

== Background ==
On 2 September 2011 the Supreme Court of New Zealand issued its ruling in the case of Hamed & Ors v. R, ruling that some evidence obtained by video surveillance of suspects in the 2007 New Zealand anti-terror raids was gathered unlawfully and was inadmissible. Following the ruling, the Crown dropped charges against thirteen of the seventeen remaining suspects. On 19 September the New Zealand government announced that it had been advised that the decision meant that almost all covert video surveillance by police was unlawful and that it intended to legislate to reverse the decision.

The following week the government began to negotiate with other parties in an effort to gain backing for the bill. During the negotiation process a draft copy of the bill was leaked by the Labour Party via its blog Red Alert.

The proposed bill was criticised by lawyers, civil libertarians, and the media, and by the Mana, Māori and Green parties. The Labour and ACT parties agreed to support the bill only to select committee. This was sufficient for the bill to be introduced. An attempt by the Labour Party to compromise by using clauses from the Search and Surveillance Bill was rejected by the government as "legislative field surgery".

== Legislative history ==
The bill was introduced to the House under urgency on 27 September 2011. As introduced, the bill was retrospective, and declared video surveillance lawful no matter when it had occurred. This was intended to apply to "current prosecutions before the courts, convictions entered as the result of past prosecutions, and existing investigations involving the gathering of evidence for potential future prosecutions". The sole exception was the Hamed case. The bill would have effect for 12 months, allowing Parliament time to progress the Search and Surveillance Act.

The bill passed its first reading 106-15 and was sent to the Justice and Electoral Select Committee for an abbreviated select committee process. The bill was heavily criticised by submitters, with the Criminal Bar Association calling it "legal magic dust", and constitutional lawyer Andrew Geddis an "overreaction". The New Zealand Human Rights Commission expressed concerns that it would damage New Zealand's international image, while former Prime Minister and architect of the New Zealand Bill of Rights Act 1990 Geoffrey Palmer labelled it "oppressive".

The bill was reported back on 3 October 2011, and substantially amended. The retrospective aspect of the bill was removed. Past surveillance would not be made lawful, but convictions obtained using evidence from such surveillance would not be able to be challenged.

The bill passed through its remaining stages under urgency on 6 October, passing its third reading 105–14, with the Greens, Māori Party, and Mana opposing. It was granted the royal assent on 17 October, and became law the following day.

The effect of the Act was limited to covert video surveillance connected to searches conducted within six months of it becoming law.

== See also ==
- 2007 New Zealand anti-terror raids
- Politics of New Zealand
