= 2007 New Zealand police raids =

Series of armed NZ police raids

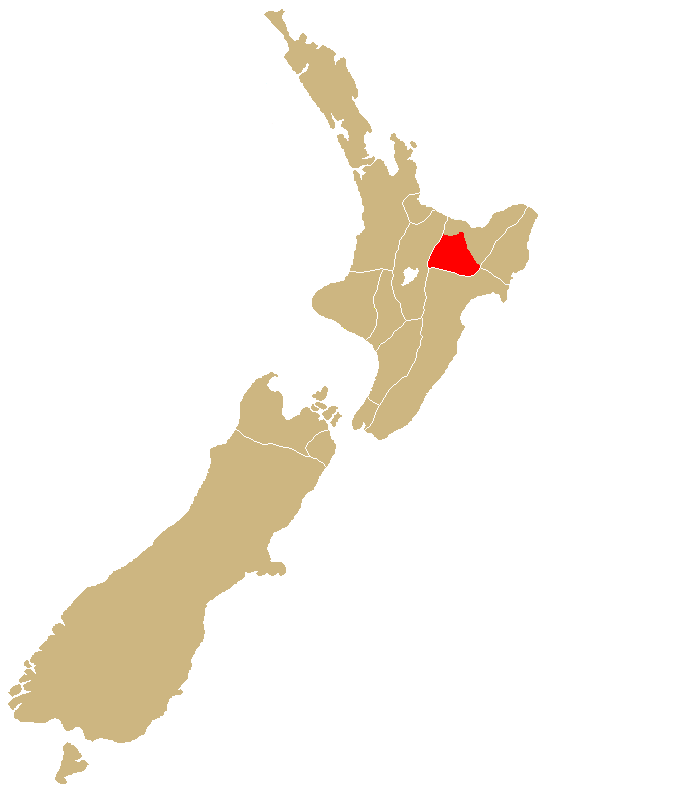
- Approximate area of the Urewera mountain range
- Date: 15 October 2007
- Location: Ruatoki and various other locations around New Zealand
- Arrests: 18
- Charges: Unlawful possession of firearms and other weapons under the Arms Act 1983
- Convictions: 4

On 15 and 16 October 2007, the New Zealand Police conducted a series of armed raids in response to alleged paramilitary training camps in the Urewera mountain range near the town of Ruatoki. About 300 police, including members of the Armed Offenders Squad and Special Tactics Group, were involved in the raids, which involved the execution of search warrants at various addresses throughout New Zealand, and the establishment of roadblocks at Ruatoki and Tāneatua. The police seized four guns and 230 rounds of ammunition and arrested eighteen people. According to police, the raids were a culmination of more than a year of surveillance that uncovered and monitored the training camps.

The police were investigating potential breaches of the Terrorism Suppression Act. On 8 November 2007 the Solicitor-General, David Collins, declined to press charges against any persons under that legislation. Collins later described the legislation as "incoherent and unworkable", and said it was almost impossible to apply to domestic terrorism in New Zealand as it was too complex. According to then Prime Minister Helen Clark, one of the reasons police tried to lay charges under anti-terror legislation was because they could not use telephone interception evidence in prosecutions under the Arms Act.

The raids were highly controversial and their legitimacy was debated by politicians, the media and the public. Hundreds of people participated in protests across New Zealand in the weeks following the raids. Of the eighteen people arrested, just four came to trial in February and March 2012, including Ngāi Tūhoe activist Tāme Iti. The defendants were found guilty on firearms charges. On the more serious charges of belonging to an organised criminal group, the jury was unable to agree. In March 2012, the cost to the taxpayer of the criminal proceedings, including legal aid and prosecution costs, was estimated to be well over NZ$6 million. The cost of the surveillance and the subsequent raids had previously been estimated to be over NZ$8 million.

In May 2013, the Independent Police Conduct Authority (IPCA) published a report of its findings and recommendations following the investigation of complaints by individuals and organisations about police actions during the raids, particularly relating to road blocks and the execution of search warrants. The IPCA concluded that although the planning and preparation for the execution of search warrants was largely in accordance with policy, the planning and preparation for the establishment of road blocks in Ruatoki and Tāneatua was "deficient" and a number of aspects of the police raids were "contrary to law and unreasonable". The police spokesman for the Labour Party, which had been in government at the time of the raids, acknowledged that innocent people had been "unnecessarily frightened and intimidated". In 2014 the Police Commissioner formally apologised to the Ruatoki community and Ngāi Tūhoe for police actions during the raids.

== Background ==
=== Historical and cultural context ===
Ngāi Tūhoe had long-held grievances against the Crown, particularly over land seizures beginning in the late nineteenth century. The traditional land of Ngāi Tūhoe is Te Urewera in the eastern North Island, a steep, heavily forested area which includes Lake Waikaremoana. Historian James Belich has described the Urewera as one of the last zones of Māori autonomy, and the scene of the last armed Māori resistance: the 1916 arrest at Maungapohatu of Rua Kenana, a claimed prophet who sought to remove the Tūhoe people from the influence of Pākehā (New Zealand Europeans).

At the time of the raids in October 2007, the Waitangi Tribunal was continuing to consider claims regarding land and self-government within the tribal boundaries, and the words "confiscation line" were painted on the road to mark the geographical boundary between land confiscated by the Crown in the 1860s and land that remained with the Tūhoe people. In 2013 the IPCA found that the police failed to properly take into account this historical and cultural context when planning the operation, and that this failure was unreasonable.

=== Operation Eight ===
In December 2005, two hunters in the remote Urewera ranges came across a camp where they found armed men, some wearing balaclavas, who appeared to be training. They reported what they had seen to the police, and the camps were put under surveillance. This led to police investigating a group of people in the Urewera area for over 18 months, some of whom had criminal records for assault and firearms offences and others who were known political activists. The investigations were termed "Operation Eight".

One of the people under investigation was Ngāi Tūhoe activist Tāme Iti, who had grown up and lived much of his life in Ruatoki, and who was one of New Zealand's best-known and most controversial activists. In 2005, acting in protest against Crown treatment of Tūhoe, Iti had shot a firearm at an Australian flag (in substitute for a New Zealand flag) during a Waitangi Tribunal hearing at Tauarau Marae. Although Iti was convicted of firearms offences, his conviction was overturned by the Court of Appeal in April 2007, on the basis that there was insufficient evidence "that property was endangered or that any person was endangered, annoyed, or frightened".

During the course of Operation Eight, police lawfully obtained text messages suggesting that paramilitary training camps were being run in remote forest locations in the Urewera mountain ranges. Police further intercepted private communications and gained information they claimed suggested that serious violent offences were about to be committed. The police also obtained covert surveillance footage of the alleged training camps (later held by the Supreme Court to have been improperly obtained in the case Hamed v R). The police's evidence identified that six training camps were held between November 2006 and September 2007, with over 60 people having either been invited to attend or attending at least one camp. The camps appeared to involve the use of weapons, explosives and Molotov cocktails, ambush exercises, patrolling drills and the practice of interrogation techniques. Some evidence also suggested that the group's intention was to form "an independent Tūhoe nation within the Urewera area".

=== Termination of Operation Eight ===
The police decided to terminate Operation Eight in October 2007, after legal advice that the evidence obtained could support charges under the Terrorism Suppression Act. The plan was to execute a number of search warrants at 41 addresses (relating to 37 individuals), one business address and eight vehicles, to make a number of arrests and to interview people who had knowledge of or involvement in the alleged training camps. In the application for search warrants police said they believed that the group intended to take control of an area of land in the Urewera area by use of military style semiautomatic firearms and Molotov cocktails. The police were later criticised by the IPCA for not preparing a more structured and detailed warrant application, and for not undertaking a formal documented review and approval process in respect of the final application. The cost of the surveillance and the subsequent raids was estimated to be over NZ$8 million.

The Special Tactics Group, made up of full-time police officers trained to provide tactical response to high risk incidents, were involved in developing a tactical plan for the raids, and in particular the execution of multiple high risk search warrants. They considered and analysed threats posed at the addresses of the principal targets, and identified certain addresses and targets which would require assistance from the Armed Offenders Squad, a unit specially trained to respond to incidents involving firearms or other weapons. The tactical plan also recommended that a roadblock be put in place in Ruatoki during the raids. Police said that this was because of the need to search remote camp locations, intelligence suggesting an unknown local group in the area posed a threat to police, and the possibility of local sympathisers and supporters. The plan recommended that the Armed Offenders Squad stop and search vehicles leaving the area for unlawful weapons, and prevent any vehicles coming into the area until it was safe to do so.

== Urewera raids ==
On 15 October 2007 the police executed search warrants at three addresses in Ruatoki, and searched the area where the training camps were taking place. Only one man was arrested in Ruatoki.

=== Police questioning of locals ===
Police maintained a strong presence in Ruatoki in the days following the initial raids and continued to question locals. Locals were advised that police had been investigating an armed group whose actions were believed to be unlawful, and who had been training in the Ruatoki area. They were asked a number of questions including whether they had knowledge of the training and what the extent of their knowledge was. The majority of community members were unable to provide any relevant information. The police later sought to frame these interviews as part of their community engagement and recovery efforts, but were criticised by the IPCA for doing so, on the basis that these interviews were evidence gathering and not about improving community relationships.

=== Roadblocks ===
Although the tactical plan for the operation only required one roadblock, on the day two separate roadblocks were established before 6:00 a.m: one at Ruatoki, and one to the north at Tāneatua. Eight members of the Armed Offenders Squad staffed the Ruatoki roadblock, and searched and questioned everyone who passed through. The Tāneatua roadblock was staffed by uniformed officers who effectively closed the road to Ruatoki and prevented any cars from passing through. The roadblocks were a source of controversy, with complaints later being made about the insensitive location of the roadblock on the "confiscation line", the nature of the details requested, photographing of drivers and occupiers without consent, the use of armed and uniformed members of the Armed Offenders Squad, inconsistent information provided by police, and the disproportionate nature of the roadblocks. The roadblocks were lifted for a ten-minute period at 11:00 a.m, but subsequently reinstated until the afternoon.

The IPCA later found that there was no lawful basis for establishing either roadblock; there was no evidence of a threat from those being searched, and any possibility of an unknown local group of sympathisers was "highly speculative and devoid of any real evidence". The police failed to adequately plan for the likely traffic volumes or assess the impact that the Ruatoki roadblock would have on the community, or to plan at all for the Tāneatua roadblock. The police also had no legal grounds for stopping and searching all vehicles at the Ruatoki roadblock, for obtaining details of the vehicle occupants or for taking photographs of occupants. It was unreasonable for police to fail to consider the likely effect on the community that would be caused by Armed Offenders Squad wearing full "black role" (a balaclava, body armour, flame retardant overalls, boots, and an equipment vest).

=== School bus stop and search ===
After reports on the day that a bus full of children from a kōhanga reo (Māori language preschool) was stopped and searched, police superintendent Wally Haumaha said these reports were wrong. However, a bus driver told a protest four days after the raid: "The police did hop on our bus and they did search our bus ... they always held their rifles." The organiser of the protest called on the government to acknowledge the incident and do something for the children affected by it. Speaking on Radio New Zealand she asked "I'd like to ask that question why? [was there nothing being done] is it because we're from Ruatoki? Is it because the majority of children are Māori out here?"

The IPCA was unable to substantiate reports that armed police boarded and searched a kōhanga reo bus carrying young children, but found that an unmarked kōhanga reo bus carrying two adults and a teenager was unlawfully stopped and searched.

== Raids elsewhere in New Zealand ==
Early on the morning of 15 October 2007, and at the same time as the raids in Urewera, the police conducted raids at other properties throughout New Zealand. Iti was arrested at the house of his partner and her teenage daughter in nearby Whakatāne. The police also made further arrests and executed additional search warrants including in Auckland, Wellington, Palmerston North and Hamilton. In total, 41 search warrants were executed across the country. On the basis of evidence obtained during those searches, additional raids were conducted on the following day, 16 October 2007.

The IPCA subsequently received complaints about searches at 11 properties, one of which was not subject to the search warrant application but was searched under the provisions of the Arms Act. The IPCA found that the police unlawfully detained occupants at five properties, that the police actions caused some occupants to feel they were being treated as suspects which was undesirable, that the police unlawfully subjected some occupants to personal searches, and that the police did not sufficiently plan for how to deal with vulnerable occupants such as children or the elderly. The IPCA also found however that the length of time police took to undertake the searches was reasonable.

=== Wellington ===
Early on the morning of 15 October 2007, four houses were searched in the Wellington region including a house used as a community centre at 128 Abel Smith Street. The community centre was a known meeting place for activists, including environmentalists, and was used for community activities and events. Iti was known to stay in the house when he was in Wellington. Around 20 police officers surrounded the house before 6:00 a.m. and used sniffer dogs to search the house and nearby properties. A television cameraman from television channel TV3, which had an office on the same street, was allowed to record the raid. Six bags of evidence including clothes and documents were seized.

=== Christchurch ===
Two Christchurch addresses inhabited by members of the Save Happy Valley Campaign were also visited by police in search of a person of interest; however, police did not have a search warrant and were refused access to the properties. Police later located the person at another Christchurch residence. The man had attended the camp in the Urewera Range after an invitation from Tūhoe activists, according to a source close to him, but did not return after being "overwhelmed" and "a bit freaked out" by the military-style practices. Police also raided a house in Christchurch that belonged to former member of Black Power with links to Tūhoe.

=== Taupō ===
A home in Taupō was searched for four hours by police following previous raids elsewhere. The home owner was the organiser of an environmental expo and ran an organics business, and denied having any connection to the Urewera group. He suspected his home was targeted because his daughter was in a relationship with a man from Ruatoki. Police seized computers and other equipment from the house; according to the occupant, this equipment was used for his organics business.

=== Tauranga ===
On the afternoon of 16 October 2007, police entered the home of a Tauranga pensioner while he was out and took an old oilskin jacket, a raincoat, a polar-fleece jacket, some magnets and an air rifle. They left behind a 20-page search warrant stating there was "reasonable ground for believing" there were items inside which were an offence relating to either "participating in a terrorist group", or the unlawful possession of firearms or restricted weapons. The occupant of the home told The New Zealand Herald that he had no idea why his home was searched and was "gutted" police had linked him to people potentially involved in terrorist crimes.

== Arrests and court cases ==
Eighteen people were arrested in the raids, including Iti. The police described those arrested as including environmentalists, peace activists and advocates for Māori. Over 1 and 2 November 2007 all of the accused appeared in court to make applications for bail or name suppression. A large crowd gathered both inside and outside the court to support the people arrested during the raids. With the Crown's support, media organisations including TVNZ, TV3 and Radio New Zealand challenged the continuing name suppression of two of the accused and sought to be permitted to take photographs during the hearing. On 31 October 2007 the High Court noted the "intense public interest" in the events and upheld the trial judge's decision to lift name suppression and permit photographs to be taken.

The accused were charged with a total of 291 charges under the Arms Act, including the illegal possession of firearms and other weapons. Four of the accused, including Iti, were also charged under section 98A of the Crimes Act 1961 with participating in an organised criminal group, which had a maximum penalty of imprisonment for five years. One of the accused died in 2011 while awaiting trial, leaving only seventeen people facing charges.

On 8 November 2007 the Solicitor-General declined to press charges under the Terrorism Suppression Act. He later described the legislation as "incoherent and unworkable", and said it was almost impossible to apply to domestic terrorism in New Zealand as it was too complex. He said he would be recommending that the legislation be sent to the Law Commission for review. Although a review was commenced, it was placed on hold in 2012 after the Minister of Justice said that the concerns had been addressed by the passage of the Search and Surveillance Act 2012. The Act was also amended by the Terrorism Suppression Amendment Bill 2007, including to correct inconsistencies with UN and UN Security Council requirements and to introduce an offence of committing a terrorist act, although the Bill was introduced before the October 2007 raids. According to then Prime Minister Helen Clark, one of the reasons police had tried to lay charges under the Terrorism Suppression Act was because they could not use telephone interception evidence in prosecutions under the Arms Act.

=== Leaked evidence controversy ===
On 14 November 2007, The Dominion Post published a front-page story "The Terrorism Files", including a photograph of an Armed Officers Squad officer with a gun, and an extract from the tapes: "Get someone to assassinate the prime minister ... just drop a bomb". The story was based on a copy of the police evidence affidavit, including the surveillance transcripts, which were protected by suppression orders. On 10 April 2008, the Solicitor-General confirmed that he would be bringing contempt of court proceedings against The Dominion Post and its publisher Fairfax Media. His application stated that the publication could have compromised the right of the accused to a fair trial: "The articles were sensational in tone and highly memorable. The fact of the publications themselves became national news."

After a hearing, the High Court decided in October 2008 that neither Fairfax Media nor the editor of the newspaper were guilty of contempt because the publications were unlikely to prejudice a fair trial of the accused, notwithstanding that their publication was in violation of court suppression orders.

=== Charges dropped ===
On 2 September 2011, the Supreme Court found by a majority decision that some of the evidence obtained by the police had been unlawfully obtained; in particular, cameras installed by the police to record the defendants engaging in military-style training were unlawful. In the case of thirteen of the accused, who only faced charges under the Arms Act, the Court concluded that the gravity of the police impropriety was such that admitting the evidence would undermine the public perception of justice, given that the accused were not charged with any intention to participate in further offending. However, in relation to the four remaining accused who were also charged with participating in an organised criminal group, the Court concluded that the seriousness of these charges meant that it would not be proportionate to exclude the evidence.

Following the Court's decision, the Crown dropped the charges against the thirteen accused who only faced charges under the Arms Act, leaving only four of the accused to face trial. The government also introduced the Video Camera Surveillance (Temporary Measures) Act 2011 to legalise covert video surveillance by state agencies.

=== Trial ===
On 13 February 2012, the trial for the remaining four defendants began in the Auckland High Court. Each pled not guilty to the charges, which were heard before a jury. The government had previously sought that the case be heard by a judge sitting alone, but agreed to a jury trial following the dismissal of the charges against the other thirteen defendants. In court the prosecution said the four defendants were the ringleaders of the organised criminal group which trained for months to take military action against civilian targets in their cause for an independent Tūhoe nation, with Tāme Iti as leader. The defence team in response sought to place the activities into their context of tikanga, political activism and the historical grievances held by Tuhoe against the Crown. The defence team also pointed out that no terrorist attacks had actually occurred. In March 2012, the cost to the taxpayer of the criminal proceedings, including legal aid and prosecution costs, was estimated to be well over NZ$6 million already.

The trial took six weeks. On the more serious charges of belonging to an organised criminal group, the jury was unable to agree, and the Crown decided not to pursue a retrial. Each of the defendants was found guilty of several charges of unlawful possession of firearms, and one charge of unlawful possession of a restricted weapon (Molotov cocktails). Iti and another defendant, Te Rangikaiwhiria Kemara, were both sentenced to two and a half years' jail, while the other two defendants were both sentenced to nine months of home detention. All four defendants appealed their convictions and sentences. On 23 April 2013 the appeals were dismissed by the Supreme Court.

== Reactions ==
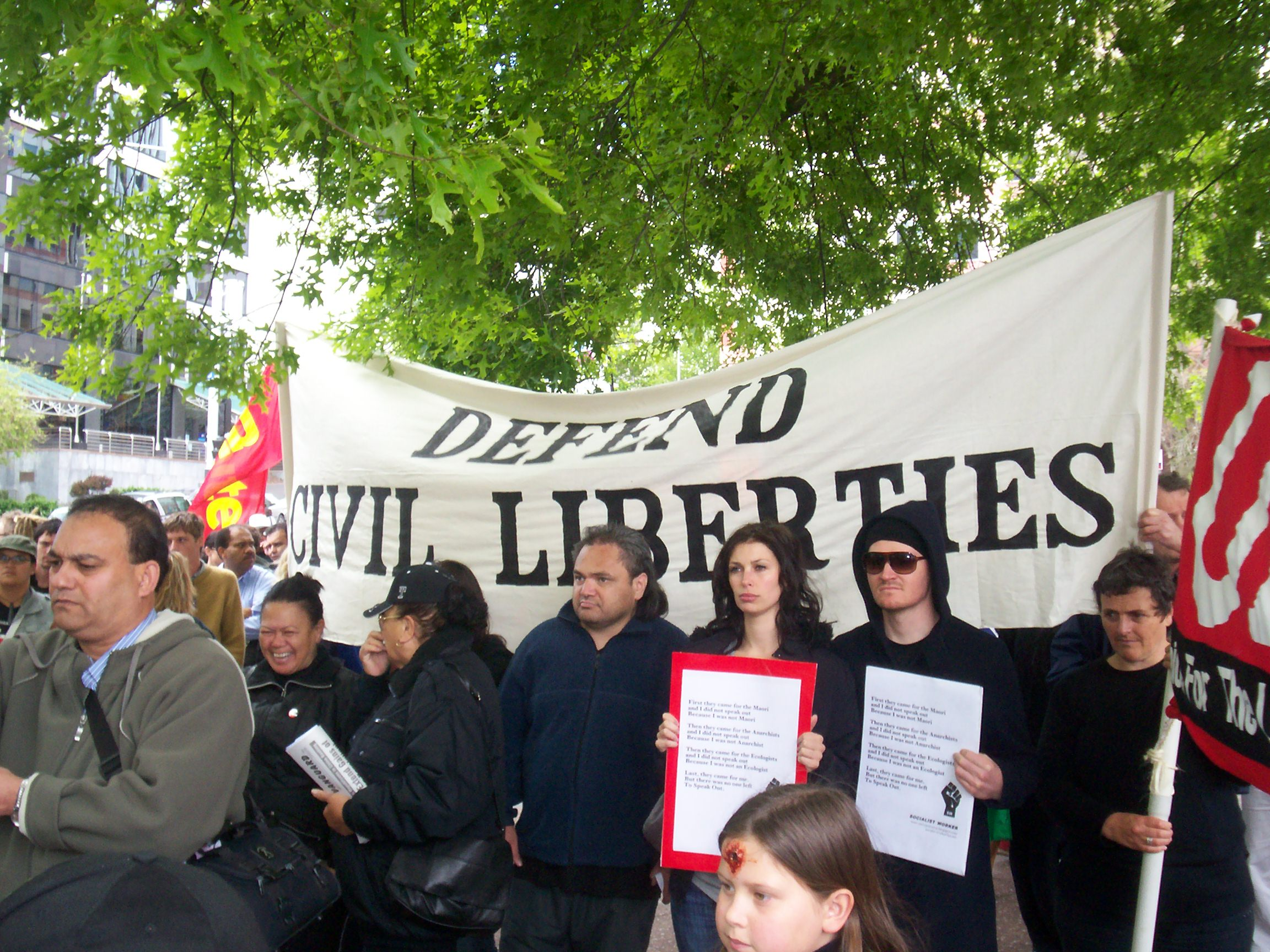
Protesters against the raids in Aotea Square, Auckland city centre

The governing Labour Party and its ministers, including Police Minister Annette King, asked MPs to remain calm about the issue, and to wait until details were exposed in the courts. Prime Minister Helen Clark, who was also the minister in charge of the Security Intelligence Service (SIS), at first distanced herself from the raids, and refused to comment on SIS involvement. Later, while the case was before Solicitor-General to consider appropriate charges, she told media that those arrested "at the very least" had been training with firearms and napalm. National Party leader John Key told media he was briefed by SIS staff days before the raids occurred.

The Māori Party condemned the raids, with Te Ururoa Flavell, the MP for Waiariki, criticising the police for putting a community in his electorate "under siege," referring to the roadblocks imposed in Ruatoki. Co-leader Pita Sharples said the actions had violated the trust that has been developing between Maori and Pākehā and had set race relations back by a century. The Green Party was also critical, with co-leader Jeanette Fitzsimons saying the raids traumatised the local population. The party later joined protests in Auckland to pressure the government to withdraw the Terrorism Suppression Act and called for those arrested to be released on bail. MP Keith Locke told TVNZ that the party would continue to protest until those held in custody are released. By contrast, New Zealand First MP Ron Mark stated that the police should be congratulated, and suggested a link between criminal gangs and the "suspected terrorist groups." He called for the anti-terrorism laws to be expanded to "outlaw criminal organisations such as gangs once and for all".

In early November 2007, Howard Broad, the Police Commissioner, admitted that the raids had damaged relations between police and Tūhoe. He said that police regretted "the hurt and stress caused to the community of Ruatoki and we will seek an appropriate way to repair the damage done to police-Maori relations". He did not, however, issue a general apology.

=== Media and public response ===
Political commentators took different views on the raids, with intelligence agencies researcher and journalist Nicky Hager suggesting the raids may have been the result of the increased police and SIS staffing and resources aimed at anti-terrorism since 2001. Veteran activist John Minto criticised the police for the move, claiming that their actions provoked a "climate of fear and repression" while liberal commentator and blogger Martyn Bradbury, sided with the police, saying that in his dealings with the activist community he had become concerned with the actions of "some clowns." New Zealand Herald columnist Matt McCarten saw the raids as being over the top; "Some of the young people I know who were arrested are actually vegans who don't even believe in killing animals, let alone human beings. When you get the police searching homes of environmental activists trying to save snails on the West Coast, you know that things have got really silly." McCarten also stated that New Zealanders should be more worried about the country joining the US database of terrorist suspects, and "the creeping powers of our secret police." However the "From the Left" columnist for The Dominion Post, Chris Trotter, reacted differently, saying "it wasn't the actions of the police that provoked my fury, but of those who'd forced their hand". He said he had always been proud of left-wing activists in New Zealand for their "steadfast refusal to either initiate violence, or respond to the violence initiated against [them]", and that the use of armed force without first exhausting democratic means was "supreme arrogance". When left-wing musician Don Franks wrote a protest song about the raids, "Safer Community Blues", he referenced Trotter's reaction with the lyrics "The political climate's getting hotter / Got to watch out for the pigs and the pigs' Trotter".

The New Zealand Council of Trade Unions, which represented over 350,000 workers, called for the repeal of the Terrorism Suppression Act. CTU President Helen Kelly said that the use of the Act "is unhelpful and is having the effect of making all political groups nervous about how this law is being and could be used." University of Canterbury academic and social justice campaigner David Small told bFM that the raids were draconian and probably illegal. Former inspector in charge of the Auckland police criminal intelligence Ross Meurant called the raids "extreme and excessive" and claimed the police were guilty of "self-hype and self-justification."

An independent survey taken in early November showed 48% of respondents wanted to wait and see what evidence the police had before they made a judgment on the raids, while 36% said they were already satisfied with the way the police reacted and 13% thought the police over-reacted. However, 41% of Māori respondents said the police had over-reacted. The sample size was 750 people.

=== Protests ===
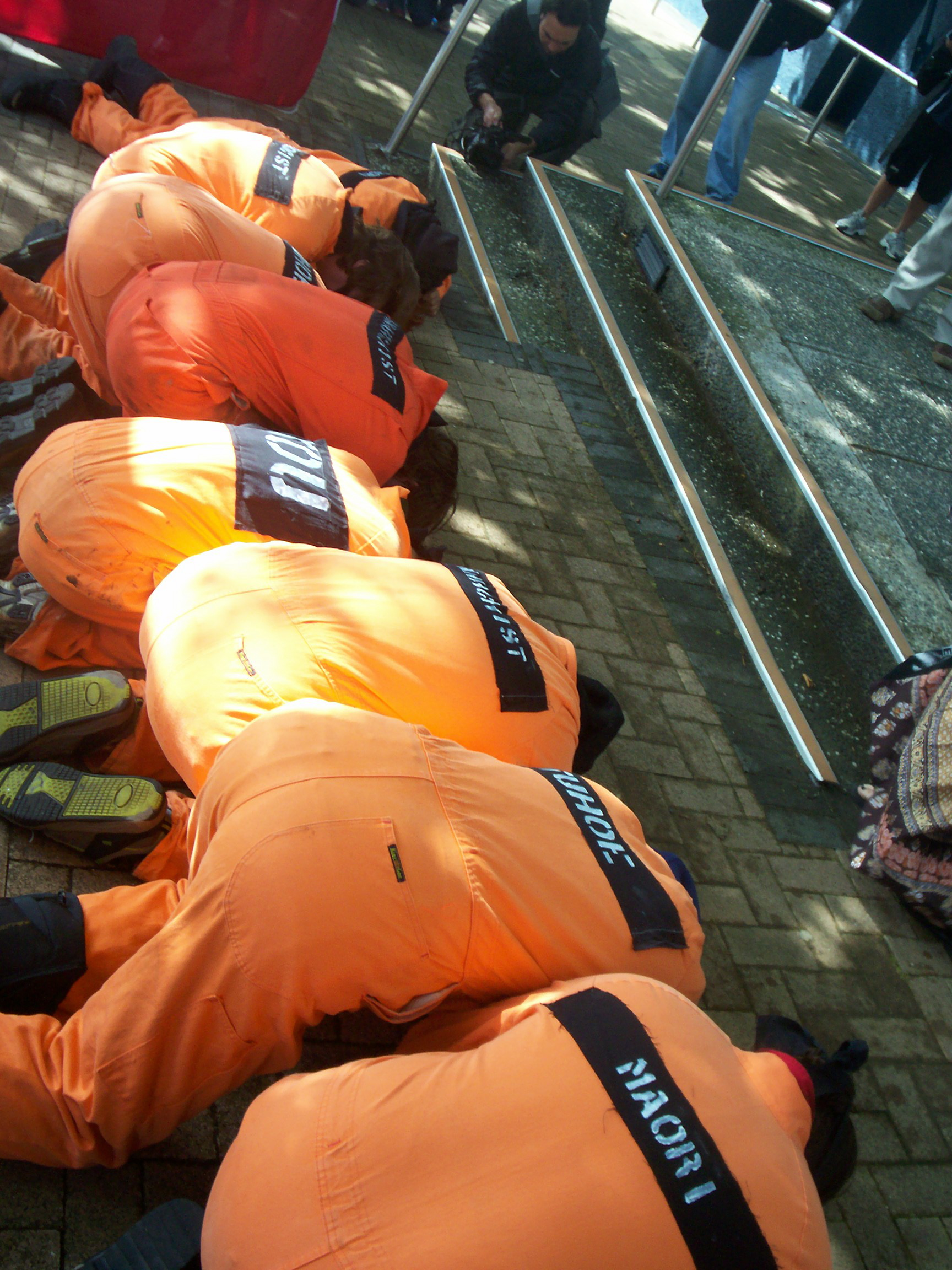
Protesters dressed as terrorism detainees outside the Labour Party conference, 3 November 2007.

A series of protests took place in the days after the raids, with hundreds of people gathering outside court buildings to protest during bail hearings. On 16 October, supporters of Tāme Iti protested at the Rotorua District Court, and peace and environmental protesters gathered in Christchurch's Cathedral Square chanted and held signs such as "Protest is not terrorism" and "Arrest me. I'm protesting, I must be a terrorist". Indigenous rights protesters also rallied outside the New Zealand Consulate in Melbourne to condemn the raids. Another protest occurred on 17 October outside the Wellington District Court. On 19 October 2007 up to a thousand people joined a peaceful hīkoi in Whakatāne to protest the fact that children had been caught up in the raids. One Māori elder speaking at the protest called for the overturning of the Terrorism Suppression Act.

The following day hundreds of protesters took to the streets across New Zealand, targeting local police stations. Protesters demanded the government withdraw the Terrorism Suppression Act and called for immediate bail for those arrested in the raids. Global Peace and Justice Auckland spokesperson Mike Treen said a "Darth Vader police force in para-military uniforms has been terrorising whole communities" and called for a national day of action the following week. On 25 October 2007, when Iti and two other defendants appeared in the Rotorua District Court, hundreds of people protested causing police to close off streets around the Rotorua Courthouse. There were protests on 27 October 2007 in 13 cities around New Zealand, and around the world including Australia, England and the United States.

On 3 November 2007, a demonstration involving about 150 people took place outside a Labour Party conference. Some protesters wearing orange boiler suits had chained themselves together with gags in their mouths and a word such as "terrorist", "Māori" or "anarchist" on their backs. Others held placards with the slogans "State terrorists kidnapped our friends" and "Free political prisoners". Len Richards, a Labour Party delegate allegedly struck a protester in the face with a megaphone, though he claimed "there was no violence" despite TV3 showing footage of the incident. According to the Workers Party, the protester was one of their members. Three men were arrested at the protest: the first was attempting to break the police line and enter the conference venue, the second was pulled off the top of a police van and a third was arrested from within the crowd. Security personnel at the venue had been significantly increased from the previous day.

A hikoi protesting the raids and the Terrorism Suppression Act left the Bay of Plenty on 12 November 2007. The hīkoi collected signatures for a petition that it presented to Parliament when it arrived in Wellington two days later. On 13 November a group of concerned individuals placed an advertisement in The Dominion Post urging the government to withdraw the terrorism legislation and the Terrorism Suppression Amendment Bill. Signatories to the advertisement included Green Party leader Jeanette Fitzsimons and National Distribution Union leader Laila Harre.

== Aftermath and formal apology ==
Auckland lawyer Peter Williams, engaged by representatives of Ngāi Tūhoe, examined whether charges could be brought against police for the raids and whether there was a case for charges of wrongful imprisonment. Williams wrote to Police Commissioner Howard Broad, seeking compensation and a restoration of mana, but on 14 December 2007 announced he had received no reply and would represent thirty members of Tūhoe in a class action against the police. He said his clients sought Broad's resignation. Ultimately, no legal action was brought, although he filed a complaint with the IPCA which included eighteen accounts from residents.

A documentary critical of the raids, Operation 8: Deep in the Forest, was directed by Errol Wright and Abi King-Jones and screened around New Zealand as part of the World Cinema Showcase film festival in 2011. A review for The Dominion Post called it a "terrific piece of New Zealand film-making", and said: "Whether or not anyone in the Ureweras was actually planning murder and mayhem is for the court to decide. Having seen Operation 8, you will seriously doubt it." The New Zealand Herald gave the movie a five out of five rating, saying "this clear-eyed, involving film stands on its own merits and deserves to be seen and debated". It was nominated for Best Arts/Festival/Feature Documentary at the 2011 Aotearoa Film & Television Awards.

In March 2013, Tūhoe and the Crown signed a deed of settlement, settling the tribe's Waitangi Tribunal claims. Under the settlement, the Crown acknowledged and apologised for breaches of the Treaty of Waitangi and its principles, agreed a historical account of the relationship between the Crown and Tūhoe, agreed to create a new legal identity and governance for the area of Te Urewera, and a financial redress package of NZ$170 million.

In May 2013, the IPCA published its report of its findings and recommendations following the investigation of complaints by individuals and organisations about police actions during the raids, particularly relating to road blocks and the execution of search warrants. The IPCA concluded that although the planning and preparation for the execution of search warrants was largely in accordance with policy, the planning and preparation for the establishment of road blocks in Ruatoki and Tāneatua was "deficient" and a number of aspects of the police raids were "contrary to law and unreasonable". A spokesperson for Ngāi Tūhoe said the report was "fair", "well-presented" and "respectful". He disagreed however with some findings, and felt the report did not sufficiently address the distress that had been caused to the local community: "I thought it should have said something very, very wrong happened ... and the lives of many people will never be the same again." The police spokesman for the Labour Party, Kris Faafoi, acknowledged that innocent people had been "unnecessarily frightened and intimidated", and supported the idea of an annual review to measure the implementation of the IPCA's recommendations. Prime Minister John Key, who had been opposition leader at the time of the raids, said that the police failures were "a serious matter in terms of the stress that they put on those communities," but highlighted that it was a "significant operation, people were charged and went to jail." The police said that they had already made changes to practices; for example Armed Offenders Squad operations now included an assessment of potential adverse effects to communities, and there had been changes to the police policy for dealing with children and vulnerable people during searches.

In 2014 the Police Commissioner Mike Bush formally apologised to the Ruatoki community and Ngāi Tūhoe for police actions during the raids. He acknowledged that the mana of the Tūhoe people had been damaged. Although he said the operation was necessary, he accepted that police actions were unlawful and that innocent people and young people had been treated with disrespect. Tamati Kruger, a spokesperson for Ngāi Tūhoe, said that most Tūhoe people accepted the apology, and it was a "really good start" to rebuilding relationships between Tūhoe and the police. In 2017, on the ten year anniversary of the raids, Kruger said: "As a community, as a tribal community, we have got over it and that we are pleased with the fact that we were part of a solution of rebuilding the relationship. All the system could do was criminalise and adjudicate blame and guilt. That is all the justice system can do and that is what it was built to do. It was not built to repair relationships. The justice systems are not in the business of love and care. People and communities are, so only they can do that."

The raids were depicted in the 2022 action-drama film Muru. The film was shot on location in the Waimana Valley, and was co-produced by and stars Tāme Iti as himself.

== See also ==
- Terrorism in New Zealand
