= Colour of right =

Legal concept

Colour of right, sometimes referred to as a claim of right, is the legal concept in common law countries of an accused's permission to the usage or conversion of an asset in the possession of another.

The concept can also refer to a right, authority or power conferred on an official by way of a relationship between various statutory or regulatory instruments, where the official is granted a position's powers without having to actually occupy the position.

In New Zealand's Crimes Act, colour of right "means an honest belief that an act is justifiable...". Using this as a defence does not automatically guarantee an acquittal; however, it does diminish the mens rea component needed for a conviction. Notably, the legal requirements proving colour of right differ in New Zealand than in other common law countries as a result of Hayes v R.

== Examples ==
Bram's friend lets him use his van to go to a party later that night. Neither Bram nor the van return the next day. Bram comes back five days later after using the van to go on a camping trip. Bram's friend goes to court for theft. He argues that he thought that he had the right to use the van for the camping trip because he was allowed to use the van to go the party.

Susan’s car is stolen from her driveway. Some days later, Susan sees an advertisement for someone selling her exact car which had been stolen. She approaches the seller by deceptively acting as an interested buyer. Susan then asks for a test drive and proceeds to drive away with the car, not returning nor paying the seller for the car on the grounds that she is the rightful owner.
