= Hayes v R =

- Court: Supreme Court of New Zealand
- Full case name: NICOLA BRONWYN HAYES v THE QUEEN
- Decided: 15 February 2008
- Citation: [2008] NZSC 3; [2008] 2 NZLR 321; (2008) 23 CRNZ 720
- Transcript: http://www.nzlii.org/cgi-bin/sinodisp/nz/cases/NZSC/2008/3.html

Court membership
- Judges sitting: Elias CJ, Blanchard, Tipping, McGrath and Anderson JJ

Nicola Bronwyn Hayes v The Queen is a decision of the Supreme Court of New Zealand issued on 15 February 2008. It considered the meaning of 'pecuniary advantage' in s 228 (and the former s 229A) of the Crimes Act 1961. The court further considered whether a belief one was acting honestly needed to be objectively reasonable for the purposes of these sections.

== Composition of the court ==
- Elias CJ, Blanchard, Tipping, McGrath and Anderson JJ. Reasons delivered by Tipping J.

== Background ==
Hayes had been injured in a car accident in 1997. At the time she was working as a primary school teacher. She applied for and received from the Accident Compensation Corporation weekly compensation. She was paid for seven years, from time to time making declarations that she was still entitled to receive such payment.

From late 1997 she helped her partner run an effluent removal firm. From 2001 onwards, when her partner was himself the victim of a car accident, the role included active physical work.

In the High Court, confirmed on appeal, it was found that at every relevant time Hayes made a declaration she was still medically entitled to weekly compensation, she acted contrary to ss 229A (since repealed, but in force at the time for some of the relevant counts) or 228 of the Crimes Act 1961, in that she used a document with the intent to gain a pecuniary advantage.

The appeal to the Supreme Court proceeded on two grounds. Firstly that Hayes was not in receipt of a pecuniary advantage within the meaning of the statute. When she reaffirmed her entitlement, no advantage was gained as she was already entitled to the compensation. Secondly that the trial judge had erred in his directions on the requisite mens rea to make out the offence. The judge had directed the jury that Hayes must have honestly and reasonably believed she was entitled to compensation.

== Legislation ==
The case turned on the interpretation of s 229A of the Crimes Act 1961 for 24 of the counts against Hayes, and the interpretation of s 228 for 5 of the counts against her. These read as follows:

- 229A Taking or dealing with certain documents with intent to defraud

Every one is liable to imprisonment for a term not exceeding 7 years who, with intent to defraud,—

(a) Takes or obtains any document that is capable of being used to obtain any privilege, benefit, pecuniary advantage, or valuable consideration; or

(b) Uses or attempts to use any such document for the purpose of obtaining, for himself or for any other person, any privilege, benefit, pecuniary advantage, or valuable consideration. …

- 228 Dishonestly taking or using document

Every one is liable to imprisonment for a term not exceeding 7 years who, with intent to obtain any property, service, pecuniary advantage, or valuable consideration,—

(a) dishonestly and without claim of right, takes or obtains any document; or

(b) dishonestly and without claim of right, uses or attempts to use any document.

== Decision ==
=== Pecuniary advantage ===
The Court of Appeal had followed a line of cases that said there was no pecuniary advantage where the accused obtained something to which she was entitled. It was for The Crown to prove a lack of entitlement regardless of the accused's intent. This created problems in cases like this as under this construction it was arguable that the risk of losing a benefit was not the same obtaining an advantage.

Tipping J preferred the following construction of pecuniary advantage "...simply anything that enhances the accused's financial position". Receiving an existing line of compensation would undoubtedly fall into this definition. This would be true even where the accused had a legal entitlement to the money. Everything turned on the accused acting dishonestly.

=== No need for a belief to be reasonable ===
The defendant was of low intelligence. She believed that her entitlement to compensation stemmed from not being paid to do the work she was employed to do prior to her accident. It was argued that she therefore lacked the dishonest intent required by the statutes. The trial judge had directed that the belief to entitlement needed to be honest and reasonable. The Crown asserted this was either the correct direction on the plain reading of the statute or that, in line with other common law jurisdictions, the court ought to read in such a requirement.

The Supreme Court rejected this argument. The statute only required the belief to be actually held, although the reasonableness of the belief could go to the accused's credibility. This was however a question for the jury.

== Result ==
Hayes failed in her appeal on the first point but the direction on the reasonableness of the belief had resulted in a real danger there had been a miscarriage of justice. The convictions were set aside.

Despite the outcome of Hayes, the Crown has relied on the case as an authority for arguing that a subjective belief in a claim of right can or often outweighs any objective claim of right. In 2010, the Cabinet formally changed the definition of claim of right to prioritize subjective belief over objective belief.

== See also ==
- List of Cases of the Supreme Court of New Zealand
