= Ngan v R =

2007 New Zealand Supreme Court decision

- Court: Supreme Court of New Zealand
- Decided: 14 August 2007
- Citation: [2007] NZSC 105; [2008] 2 NZLR 48; (2007) 23 CRNZ 754; (2007) 8 HRNZ 447
- Transcript: http://www.nzlii.org/cgi-bin/sinodisp/nz/cases/NZSC/2007/105.html

Court membership
- Judges sitting: Elias CJ, Blanchard, Tipping, McGrath and Anderson JJ

Kevin Jack Ngan v The Queen is a decision of the Supreme Court of New Zealand, which was handed down on 13 December 2007. The decision held that evidence of a crime discovered incidental to an inventory search of a car involved in an accident was admissible in court. The court considered the scope and application of Section 21 of the New Zealand Bill of Rights Act 1990 (BORA), regarding the right to be free of unreasonable search and seizure.

== Composition of the Court ==
Sitting on the bench were Chief Justice Sian Elias, and Justices Peter Blanchard, Andrew Tipping, John McGrath and Noel Anderson. The judgement was unanimous with the reasons of Justices Elias, Blanchard and Anderson given by Justice Blanchard. Justice Tipping gave his own concurring judgement, and Justice Mcgrath agreed with the result but employed a different line of reasoning.

== Background ==
Kevin Ngan crashed while speeding near Marton late on Waitangi Day in 2005. Mr Ngan was rescued and taken to hospital. The police officer in charge of the scene began the process of securing the vehicle. There was a large amount of cash scattered in and around the vehicle as well as an open case containing a computer and a soft sunglasses case. When the sunglasses case was opened it was discovered to contain, in addition more cash, a quantity of methamphetamine and LSD. At trial, the officer explained that the pouch had not been opened because he suspected the presence of drugs, although the large amount of cash may have caused him to suspect that its source was from drug sales, but rather, in order to make an inventory search for the safe keeping of Mr Ngan's property.

== Lower courts ==
At the High Court the trial judge found for admissibility on the basis that, while the search was not sanctioned and therefore illegal, it was not unreasonable and not a breach of s21 BORA. Additionally, had there been a breach he would have admitted the evidence on the basis of inevitable discovery.

The Court of Appeal did not make a ruling on the lawfulness or otherwise of the search as it agreed that the evidence would have inevitably been discovered by the police acting in line with their common law duties to take possession of the property of a crash victim where he is in no state to do so.

== Reasoning ==
=== Common law powers ===
The police have both absolute duties and discretionary duties. The duty to gather and protect property at a crash scene and to account for items of value is a discretionary duty. Whether this interference is lawful or not is determined by the parameters set in R v Waterfield – one needs to consider if the action fell within a statutory duty or common law power, and if the action was an unjustified use of that power. The police owed obligations as bailees to Mr Ngan. Chiefly there was a duty to minimise risk of damage to or loss of the property. Taking appropriate steps to identify and account for the property served to protect both the owner and the bailee.

Here on the facts the court found 1. The police conducted a search of the pouch. 2. There was prima facie an interference. 3. This was justified within the terms of Waterford.

=== Human Rights jurisprudence ===
BORA s21 now overtakes the common law considerations, but the rights secured therein are consistent with the common law rights enshrined within Waterford.

"Everyone has the right to be secure against unreasonable search or seizure, whether of the person, property, or correspondence, or otherwise".

The court found that the BORA did not make the search of Mr Ngan's property unlawful.

"Both the common law and s 21 require of the police officer that he or she should not act unreasonably in dealing with the property, that is, that the officer must act only for the purpose of its preservation, and that what is done with the property pending its restoration to the owner must be reasonably connected with that purpose. If it is necessary to conduct a search of the property in order to ascertain its ownership and/or its nature, that too must not be done unreasonably. An excessive search or one conducted for an ulterior purpose, in order, for example, to obtain evidence of criminal offending, would not be reasonable and indeed might also be unlawful. But if the police officer is genuinely acting for the predominant purpose of preservation of the property, the fact that he or she may suspect wrongdoing associated with the property will not in itself make the dealing with the property either unlawful or unreasonable at common law or under s 21."

== Decision ==
In the circumstances, the police were acting legally, justifiably and even prudently in opening and making an inventory search of what otherwise might be considered a harmless inexpensive object. The evidence was admissible. The court rejected the submission that even if the search was reasonable for the purposes of making an administrative inventory their fruits could not be used for a prosecution.

== See also ==
- List of Cases of the Supreme Court of New Zealand
