= Austin Nichols & Co Inc v Stichting Lodestar =

Austin Nichols & Co v Stichting Lodestar
- Court: Supreme Court of New Zealand
- Full case name: Austin Nichols & Co v Stichting Lodestar
- Decided: 11 December 2007
- Citation: [2007] NZSC 103
- Transcript: http://www.nzlii.org/cgi-bin/sinodisp/nz/cases/NZSC/2007/103.html

Court membership
- Judges sitting: Elias CJ, Blanchard, Tipping, McGrath and Anderson JJ

Austin Nichols & Co Inc v Stichting Lodestar [2007] NZSC 103 is a decision of the Supreme Court of New Zealand handed down on 11 December 2007. It is the leading authority on the role of an appellate court in general appeals.

== Composition of the Court ==
Elias CJ, Blanchard, Tipping, McGrath and Anderson JJ. The judgment was unanimous and united. Elias J delivered the Court's reasons.

== Decision ==
This was originally a trade mark dispute, but the importance of the case lies in the impact on civil procedure. Austin Nichols marketed a brand of bourbon called Wild Turkey, Stichting Lodestar wished to register a whiskey called Wild Geese.
