= Search and Surveillance Act 2012 =

Law of New Zealand

New Zealand's Search and Surveillance Act 2012 received Royal Assent on 5 April 2012, after being introduced in 2009. The three-year gap between the introduction of the Bill into Parliament and assent indicates the extent of the debates that occurred over the proposed extension of search and surveillance powers held by the State. A number of parties were concerned with the effect the Act would have on individual human rights, and the Green Party expressed the view that enforcement agencies were already abusing their powers. Others argued that the Act would make it easier to determine in each situation whether a lawful search had been carried out, as the law would be more clear and accessible if contained in just one instrument. Some parties believed that codification and clarification of the search and surveillance law would result in more compatibility with human rights.

== History ==
The creation of the Search and Surveillance Act 2012 was considered necessary by the New Zealand Parliament. Previously, both police and non-police powers were found in a myriad of statutes and amendments that had developed in a "piecemeal fashion over a long period of time". In many circumstances, the correct legal test was difficult to ascertain, and rules would vary from one instrument to another. The New Zealand Law Commission said that because it is necessary for the State to exercise some coercive powers of surveillance, there must be requirements for regulation. Issues with the previous state of the law are exemplified in the case of Hamed & Ors v R, where uncertainty arose from the lack of statutory controls on police power in the area of visual surveillance.

The Law Commission also realised that much of the previous law was out of date; the coercive powers held by enforcement agencies were insufficient to deal with sophisticated organised crime, which often utilised advanced technology. The report focused on the fact that most information is no longer only available in a hard copy, and instead computer and internet networks are increasingly used for communicating information.

== New Zealand Law Commission report ==
The Commission discussed at chapter two of the report the balance needed between human rights values and law enforcement values, where a "principled, values-based approach to search powers" is needed. The main Bill of Rights Act provision that was brought into question by the proposed Bill was s21, the right of individuals “to be secure from unreasonable search or seizure, whether of the person, property, or correspondence, or otherwise”. In the Search and Surveillance Act, any decision to exercise a search or seizure must be reasonable, as must the execution of the act. The commission also recognised New Zealand's international commitment to the International Covenant on Civil and Political Rights (ICCPR). Four human rights values that the Commission felt the Bill potentially conflicted with were:

- The protection of privacy
- The protection of personal integrity
- The protection of property rights
- The maintenance of the rule of law

=== Protection of privacy ===
The degree of privacy to which everyone should be entitled is a well-debated topic. Given modern technologies, encroachments on individual privacy have become much easier, and there is a lot of concern for invasions of privacy by law enforcement activities. The Commission considered the wording of s21 of the Bill of Rights Act with reference to the draft White Paper Bill. The protection of s21 was intended to apply to "any circumstances where state intrusion...is unjustified" and this was to extend to all forms of surveillance. Section 21 of the Bill of Rights Act partially incorporated the ICCPR, which emphasizes an international right to privacy. Even case law has indicated that the underpinning value in s21 is the right to privacy.

=== Protection of personal integrity ===
In some situations a reasonable search will also involve detaining the individual, which questions the right to be free from restraint. If detention is involved, law enforcement bodies must continue to "respect human rights norms directed at personal integrity". This is also important in situations where body searches and blood tests are required.

=== Protection of property rights ===
Enjoyment of property rights is important to New Zealand society, and individuals see the protection of such rights as part of the state's role. Although there is no direct reference to property rights in the Bill of Rights Act, s21 states that property cannot be unreasonably searched or seized.

=== Maintenance of the rule of law ===
The importance of this is well summarized by the United Nations Human Rights Committee in its General Comment on article 17 of the ICCPR: "The term 'unlawful' means that no interference can take place except in cases envisaged by the law. Interference authorized by States can only take place on the basis of law...". Any search or seizure can only take place if there is a positive law which allows this.

== Reasonable limits on human rights ==
Human rights norms are only intended to protect against "unreasonable" search or seizure. This means that in some situations reasonable limits will be placed on rights in order to achieve "the functioning of the state and to protect the rights of others". Difficulties with the application of the right to privacy can be seen in Article 8(2) of the European Convention on Human Rights, where public authorities may interfere with individual privacy rights for reasons including "in the interests of national security, public safety or the economic well-being of the country, for the prevention of disorder or crime, for the protection of health or morals, or for the protection of the rights and freedoms of others". To determine reasonableness of an invasion of privacy, the Commission suggests consideration of a range of factors such as: the significance of the right contained in the relevant Bill of Rights Act section, the public interest of the intrusion on the particular right, how effective the invasion is in protecting interests which were provided to justify limitations on a right, and the proportionality of the intrusion.

== Submission by the Human Rights Commission ==
The purpose of the Human Rights Commission in New Zealand is the protection of human rights in accordance with the United Covenants and Conventions on Human Rights. The Submission agreed with the New Zealand Law Commission Report, in that any new piece of legislation would have to balance law enforcement values and human rights values. The Commission discussed the potential rights violations that might occur if five extensions of power proposed by the Bill were enacted:

- Extending search and surveillance powers to other agencies
- Consent to search by a minor
- Residual warrants
- Examination orders
- Confidential journalistic sources.

=== Extension of search and surveillance powers ===
The Bill consolidated police powers, but also extended search and surveillance powers to non-enforcement agencies. The Commission expressed concern that this extension was unnecessary and that the powers granted were "disproportionately invasive".

=== Consent by minors ===
As a general rule, minors under 14 are unable to consent to any type of search, however the Bill validates consent when a minor is operating a vehicle and there is nobody over 14 in the vehicle at the time. The age of 14 is used because that is the age when a child can legally be left alone without parental supervision. The Commission felt that it was unnecessary to lower the age to 14 in such circumstances. The Convention on the Rights of the Child specifies that a person is a child until they turn 18, and the Commission considered that this is the age of consent that should be used in all search situations.

=== Residual warrants ===
This type of warrant is required when the search proposed by the enforcement agency may result in an invasion of a person's reasonable expectation of privacy. It is up to the agency to make the decision as to whether there might be an intrusion of a person's reasonable expectation of privacy, and the Commission considered that this may conflict with human rights values.

=== Examination orders ===
The Bill gives enforcement agencies a limited power of examination in reference to individual persons, as long as the agency has grounds to suspect a specific offence has been or will be committed, and that the person possesses relevant information. This would be contrary to the privilege against self-incrimination in many situations. The Commission wanted the definition of information limited to "assessments of complex documents for fraud purposes" to try and protect people from unjust self-incrimination.

=== Confidential journalistic source ===
Although freedom of expression must always be balanced against other competing public interests, it is an important feature in New Zealand's democracy. The provisions of the Bill conflict most with freedom of expression in relation to the press. Confidentiality of sources is a key journalistic principle, however the Bill warrants searches to determine those sources. The Commission considered that a presumption should be included in the legislation against journalists being subject to the search provisions. The commission also recommended that a provision be added to the legislation which requires all agencies to act only in accordance with human rights values when exercising their search and surveillance powers. A purpose clause was included by the Justice and Electoral Committee to ensure that existing rights found in the New Zealand Bill of Rights Act 1990, the Privacy Act 1993 and the Evidence Act 2006 are all recognised. This inclusion in the final piece of legislation demonstrates the importance of human rights values "in the context of search and surveillance powers".

== Statement of the Attorney-General ==
In the statement issued by the Attorney-General regarding the Bill's consistency with the Bill of Rights Act, it was reported that the Act would not result in any rights violations.

== Search and Surveillance Act ==
The Bill narrowly passed through Parliament by 61 votes to 57, with all of the Opposition voting against, as well as the Māori Party. Case law is likely to determine the scope of the Act in the future, especially in conjunction with s21 of the Bill of Rights Act. Simon Collier wrote in a 2012 article that the Act "is a marked improvement on the previous law in the area of surveillance" and was necessary to properly safeguard rights. There are still varying views on the expansion of search and surveillance powers within this Act.
