= Penny and Hooper case =

2011 New Zealand taxation case

Penny and Hooper v Commissioner of Inland Revenue
- Court: Supreme Court of New Zealand
- Full case name: Ian David Penny and Gary John Hooper v Commissioner of Inland Revenue
- Decided: 24 August 2011
- Citation: [2011] NZSC 95
- Transcript: NZHerald

Court membership
- Judges sitting: Elias CJ, Blanchard, Tipping, McGrath and William Young JJ

Keywords
- tax avoidance

Penny and Hooper ([2011] NZSC 95) was a landmark taxation case in New Zealand that reached the Supreme Court of New Zealand, which was a major victory for the Inland Revenue Department (IRD) on the issue of tax avoidance.

== Background ==
Ian Penny and Gary Hooper were both orthopaedic surgeons in Christchurch, who had both restructured their respective business structures from a sole trader status to that of an employee working for an incorporated company, which had the effect of reducing their tax bill by tens of thousands of dollars per year due to the fact that in year 2000 the taxation rate for an individual became 39%, whereas for a company it was only 33%. Ian Penny's structure was in fact so altered in 1997, well before the government created a personal vs trust/company tax rate differential.

The salaries of the surgeons under the new structure were substantially less than their previous incomes when they were sole traders. This resulted in 2002, in Hooper’s case, out of total company income of $567,000 he was only paid a salary of $120,000, and Penny out of $832,000 a salary of $100,000.

The tax department recognised that there may be legitimate reasons for a taxpayer to structure its affairs in such a way, but as they deemed the salaries as "artificially" low (i.e. below market price), they deemed it as a tax avoidance arrangement, making the surgeons liable for the extra amount in tax.

A tax avoidance arrangement is as follows:

Tax avoidance arrangement means an arrangement, whether entered into by the person affected by the arrangement or by another person, that directly or indirectly–

(a) Has tax avoidance as its purpose or effect; or

(b) Has tax avoidance as one of its purposes or effects, whether or not any other purpose or effect is referable to ordinary business or family dealings, if the purpose or effect is not merely incidental

While it was clear that the surgeon’s salaries were way below market value (a concept somewhat new to tax legislation), and so arguably a tax avoidance arrangement, Penny and Hooper did initially successfully defend this matter in the High Court. The IRD overturned this at the New Zealand Court of Appeal by a 2:1 majority. Penny and Hooper appealed to the Supreme Court of New Zealand.

== Decision ==
The Supreme Court upheld the Court of Appeals decision that it was a tax avoidance arrangement.
