= Owen v R =

New Zealand Supreme Court judgment

Owens v R
- Court: Supreme Court of New Zealand
- Citation: [2007] NZSC 102; [2008] 2 NZLR 37; (2007) 23 CRNZ 710
- Transcript: http://www.nzlii.org/cgi-bin/sinodisp/nz/cases/NZSC/2007/102.html

Kurt John Owen v The Queen [2007] NZSC 102 is a decision of the Supreme Court of New Zealand handed down on 11 December 2007. It concerned the grounds for appeal in section 385(1)(a) of the Crimes Act 1961.

== Composition of the Court ==
Chief Justice Sian Elias, and Justices Peter Blanchard, Andrew Tipping, John McGrath and Noel Anderson. The judgment was unanimous. Tipping read the court's decision.

== Legislation ==
The Crimes Act gave a right to appeal to the Court of Appeal or the Supreme Court where "That the verdict of the jury should be set aside on the ground that it is unreasonable or cannot be supported having regard to the evidence".

The appellant who had been convicted of sexual violation, appealed to the Court of Appeal who found against him. Mr Owen then appealed to the Supreme Court on the basis that the Court of Appeal had blurred the lines between two distinct grounds for appeal in the section.

== Decision ==
Leave was given by the court chiefly as passages in the Court of Appeal's judgment indicated that a verdict could only be unreasonable where it could not be supported on the evidence.

The distinction between the grounds was based on the historic difference between an appeal based on fact (here unreasonability) and one based on law (unsupported). The former had not been permissible until the legislative ancestor to the Crimes Act gave that right. Although conceptually an unreasonable verdict would out of necessity also include a verdict that was unsupportable, from the start the legislation had maintained this tautologous distinction. Courts had followed the letter of the law in maintaining the grounds as distinct, albeit with some overlap. The Supreme Court found that it was time to cease the support of the distinction and that henceforth the touchstone for an appeal under this section would be unreasonableness.

The court accepted the Court of Appeal's definition of unreasonableness in R v Munroe; "A verdict will be deemed unreasonable where it is a verdict that, having regard to all the evidence, no jury could reasonably have reached to the standard of beyond reasonable doubt", with the minor alteration of expunging the word "deemed" as it indicated that a court might find a verdict unreasonable when it was not in fact. Applying this standard to the facts of Mr Owen's case the court found that the verdict which the jury had come to was in light of the evidence not unreasonable.
