= Hamed v R =

Hamed & Ors v. R
- Court: Supreme Court of New Zealand
- Decided: 2 September 2011
- Citation: [2011] NZSC 101

Court membership
- Judges sitting: Elias CJ, Blanchard, Tipping, McGrath and Gault JJ

Hamed & Ors v. R [2011] NZSC 101 was a decision by the Supreme Court of New Zealand which ruled on the admissibility of video surveillance. The ruling held that evidence collected using criminal trespass on private land to conduct covert surveillance under a warrant is only admissible for serious crimes. The charges involved were related to the 2007 New Zealand anti-terror raids, as a result of the ruling, charges against all but four of the defendants were dropped.

The ruling was initially suppressed from 24 March 2011 to September 2011. Very shortly after the lifting of the suppression, the Video Camera Surveillance (Temporary Measures) Act 2011 was introduced and passed under urgency.
