= Māori Trustee =

New Zealand statutory corporation sole

The Māori Trustee is a statutory corporation sole with perpetual succession in New Zealand. The Trustee administers, as trustee or agent, Māori land trusts and other Māori entities.

The Māori Trustee administers about 1,800 Māori land trusts, which is about one-third of such trusts. Māori land trusts are a type of legal governance structure by which multiple owners of Māori land can manage their land. Under any trust, whether a Māori land trust or a private family trust, one or more people – the "trustees" – are the legal owners of the land or other property, but they have a special obligation to look after this property on behalf of, and for the benefit of, some other person or people, called the "beneficiaries". With a Māori land trust, the trustees must manage the land for the benefit of all the owners of the land.

The role of the Māori Trustee is to provide fair, proper, and prudent administration and management of clients' assets within the principles and obligations of trusteeship and agency and in accordance with the Māori Trustee Act 1953, which established the Māori Trustee and identifies its roles and functions, the Trustee Act 1956, Te Ture Whenua Māori Act 1993, and other applicable legislation.

The current Māori Trustee is Dr Charlotte Severne, who was appointed in September 2018 by the Minister for Māori Development, Nanaia Mahuta, and reappointed by Willie Jackson in 2021. Previous Māori Trustees include Jamie Tuuta from 2011 to 2018, and John Paki, both of whom were appointed by the Minister of Māori Affairs, Pita Sharples.

== Status of Māori land and role of the Māori Land Court ==
Māori land has a unique legal status in New Zealand. The definition of Māori land is provided by section 129 of Te Ture Whenua Māori Act 1993. The Act recognises Māori land as taonga tuku iho, a treasure to be handed down. The Māori Land Court promotes the retention and use of Māori land and facilitates the occupation, development, and use of that land. The Māori Land Court is the specialist court of record in New Zealand that hears matters relating to Māori land. The key aim for the Māori Trustee is to manage the adverse effects of fragmented and multiple ownership of Māori land.

=== Crown acquisition and fragmentation of Māori land ===
Before the arrival of European settlers, Māori had collective kaitiakitanga (guardianship) for the whenua (land) in their territory. Collective ownership meant that no one person had ownership rights, and everyone was responsible for ensuring its protection and sustainability for the future. The arrival of European settlers from the early 1800s meant that Māori land was in high demand. However, the European concept of outright ownership caused confusion and conflict.

Following the signing of the Treaty of Waitangi in 1840, significant tracts of Māori land were acquired by the Crown. The Native Land Act 1862 and Native Lands Act 1865 established the Native Land Court and introduced individual land titles to replace customary communal titles. The court could decide on who owns land, and legislation allowed for a maximum of only 10 owners to be named per title. Because land was not collectively owned, individuals were able to decide what they could do with their interests, which resulted in increased sales. By 1870, almost the entire South Island had been taken by the Crown, and by the early 1900s, most of the North Island had too.

In 1873, changes to the Native Land Court through the Native Lands Act 1873 led to even greater fragmentation of Māori land. Everyone with an ownership interest could be put on title (not just 10), and owners had shares in the land. These shares could be partitioned (and re-partitioned). Many land blocks became difficult to administer, and others were deemed to be 'uneconomic'.

=== Native Trustee established ===
In 1920, the Native Trustee Act established both the Native Trustee and the Native Trustee Office. The purpose of this was to help Māori better manage the remaining Māori land. The rate of Māori land acquisition slowed markedly after Gordon Coates replaced W. H. Herries as native minister in 1921. The Native Land Court changed its focus to helping to develop Māori land and the Native Trustee was able to loan money to individual Māori. Under the influence of Sir Apirana Ngata, the Native Trustee funded a series of large land development schemes in rural areas. Responsibility for administering Māori land moved from the Public Trustee to the Native Trustee.

In 1932, the Native Trustee Office merged with the Native Department. In 1934 the Native Department absorbed the staff of the Native Trustee Office, and shortly after the end of the Second World War, further administrative functions of the Native Trustee were transferred to District Offices of the Native Department, and the Māori Trustee lost its independence from government.

==== Native Trustee renamed to Māori Trustee ====
The Native Department was renamed the Department of Māori Affairs in 1947 after Prime Minister Peter Fraser, who was also Minister of Native Affairs, passed legislation substituting the word Māori for Native wherever it occurred. The Native Trustee became the Māori Trustee.

==== Māori Trustee regains independence and office becomes Te Tumu Paeroa ====
In 2009, amendments to the Māori Trustee Act 1953 resulted in the disestablishment of the former Māori Trustee Office, and the Māori Trustee regained independence from the Crown. Section 5 of the Māori Trustee Act 1953 included that "the Māori Trustee must act independently, free from any direction or instruction from the Crown". This led to the establishment of Te Tumu Paeroa as a standalone organisation supporting the Māori Trustee to provide professional trustee services.

== Māori Trustee acquires interests in Māori land ==
The Māori Affairs Act 1953 aimed to force unproductive Māori land into use. It enabled the Māori Trustee to purchase uneconomic interests (defined as any share in Māori land that was valued at less than £10, later changed to £25), and make the shares available for purchase by other owners in the land block. The acquisition of uneconomic interests was known as "compulsorily acquired shares". From the late 1950s to the mid 1960s Māori Trustee acquired substantial interests in Māori land, both through compulsory acquisition and through voluntary sale.

== Māori Trustee and issues with perpetual leases ==
Perpetual leases were established from the late 1800s and apply to Māori land reserves or land that was returned to Māori as compensation, and then leased by the Public Trustee under perpetual leases. In 1955, the Māori Reserved Land Act continued the system of perpetual leases for Māori land that were originally established by the Public Trustee. This Act empowered the Māori Trustee to convert any outstanding fixed term leases to leases in perpetuity. The legislation continued to allowed to Māori Trustee to acquire uneconomical interests or purchase any interest that the beneficiary or beneficiaries in question wished to sell, and to sell that land under such terms as the Trustee saw fit.

In 1996, Māori Reserved Land Amendment Bill aimed to restore balance to the relationship between owners and lessees. To achieve this the Act required rents to increase to the market rate and to be reviewed every seven years. This had led to significant rent increases on Māori reserved land every seven years.
