= Francis Dart Fenton =

- Born: c. 1824; London, England
- Died: 23 April 1898; Auckland
- Occupation: Judge
- Spouse: Martha Connell

Francis Dart Fenton (c. 1824 – 23 April 1898) was a New Zealand magistrate, judge, public administrator and musician.

Fenton was born in London, England, where he was baptised at St. Mary's church in Islington on 6 August 1824. He was educated at the Collegiate boarding school in Sheffield, in Yorkshire, and was articled to his uncle James Crossland Fenton who was a solicitor in Huddersfield. He went to Auckland, New Zealand, in 1850, and cultivated land on the Waikato River. In 1851 he was appointed by Sir George Grey (then Governor) to a position in the Deeds Office at Auckland, and subsequently became Resident Magistrate and Collector of Customs at Kaipara. In March 1856 he was made Native Secretary by Governor Browne; but his policy clashing with that of (afterwards Sir) Donald McLean, Chief Native Land Commissioner, he was compelled to resign, and was appointed Resident Magistrate at Whaingaroa (now Raglan). On 9 May 1857, as the result of a paper of suggestions which he had addressed to the Governor, he was summoned to act as magistrate at Waikato at a critical time in the difficulties preceding the Waikato war. His appointment, "at the earnest request of the natives," was the promise of a new departure on the part of the Government, who had resolved that the Maori should be governed by laws "enacted with their own consent," and instructed Fenton to prepare a code upon this understanding. Fenton proceeded to Waikato, but on 14 July 1857, Potatau accepted the kingship offered him by the malcontent tribes, and he was shortly afterwards withdrawn. From 1858 to 1864 Fenton acted as assistant law officer of the Crown. In 1861 he prepared the Domain Act, and in 1863 was charged with the working of the New Zealand Settlement Act.

Fenton was admitted as a barrister and solicitor in New Zealand in January 1857. In 1865 Fenton was employed to draw up the Native Lands Act, and became Chief Judge of the Native Land Court, a post which he held for seventeen years. He was appointed to the New Zealand Legislative Council on 2 June 1869, but was disqualified (as chief judge of the Native Land Court) on 30 December 1870. He then introduced a bill to amend the Native Lands Act, which was passed, however he failed to pass the Native Reserves Bill.

In 1880, under the eponymous Fenton Agreement, Judge Fenton oversaw the setting up of the Township of Rotorua as a Polynesian Spa and health resort where tourists could indulge in hot pools. 50 acres of land was leased to the Crown by the Ngāti Whakaue people, thereby granting the government the authority to offer 99-year leases on their behalf. The eponymous Fenton Street in the modern city’s CBD is recorded in surveyor Percy Smith's memoranda as the only non-Māori name to appear in the new township. The city’s Arawa Street is also thought to have been in his honour, for setting up the town.

Fenton assisted in the successful opposition to the importation of Ghoorka regiments for the purposes of the war, but was ultimately disqualified as an official from sitting in the council. He was for two years district judge of Auckland, in addition to his other appointments, and retired from public service in 1882. Fenton was singularly well acquainted with the Māori language, and the history and customs of the people. In addition to various pamphlets, he was the author of "Observations on the State of the Aboriginal Inhabitants of New Zealand" (Auckland, 1859), and "Suggestions for a History of the Origin and Migrations of the Maori People" (1885).

Fenton was buried at Purewa Cemetery in the Auckland suburb of Meadowbank.
