= Ahuwhenua =

Māori concept

Ahuwhenua is a principle in Māori culture, relating to industrious cultivation of land. In modern times, the word typically refers to a type of land management trust for indigenous lands in New Zealand, and to the Ahuwhenua Trophy, an annual agricultural award.

== Concept ==
Ahuwhenua is a traditional concept relating to horticultural activity, such as gardening and harvesting. Ahunwhenua was seen as a noble trait, and the ability to provide for family through agricultural cultivation. Over time, the word ahuwhenua in Māori language began to adopt a meaning similar to the English word industrious, and could refer to contexts outside of farming.

Ahu Whenua Trusts are a modern form of land management, where Māori land owned by multiple owners is managed together. This type of trust was first legally developed as a part of the Te Ture Whenua Maori Act (1993), however similar structures have been in place since the Maori Affairs Act (1953), where they were known as 438 Trusts Ahu Whenua Trusts are the most common form of administration for agricultural Māori land in New Zealand. Ahu Whenua Trusts were created as a method to combat the fragmentation of Māori land titles, an issue that had been accelerated by the establishment of the Māori Land Court in 1865.

== Ahuwhenua Trophy ==
From 1932 to 1990, the Department of Māori Affairs had an annual award, the Ahuwhenua Trophy, celebrating the best Māori farmers in Aotearoa. The award was established by politician Āpirana Ngata, as a way to promote European-style farming methods among traditional farmers, and improve the economic prosperity of Māori. The award was revived in 2003.
