= Capilla del Carmen (Valparaíso) =

National monument of Chile

Coordinates: 33.0518°S 71.6113°W

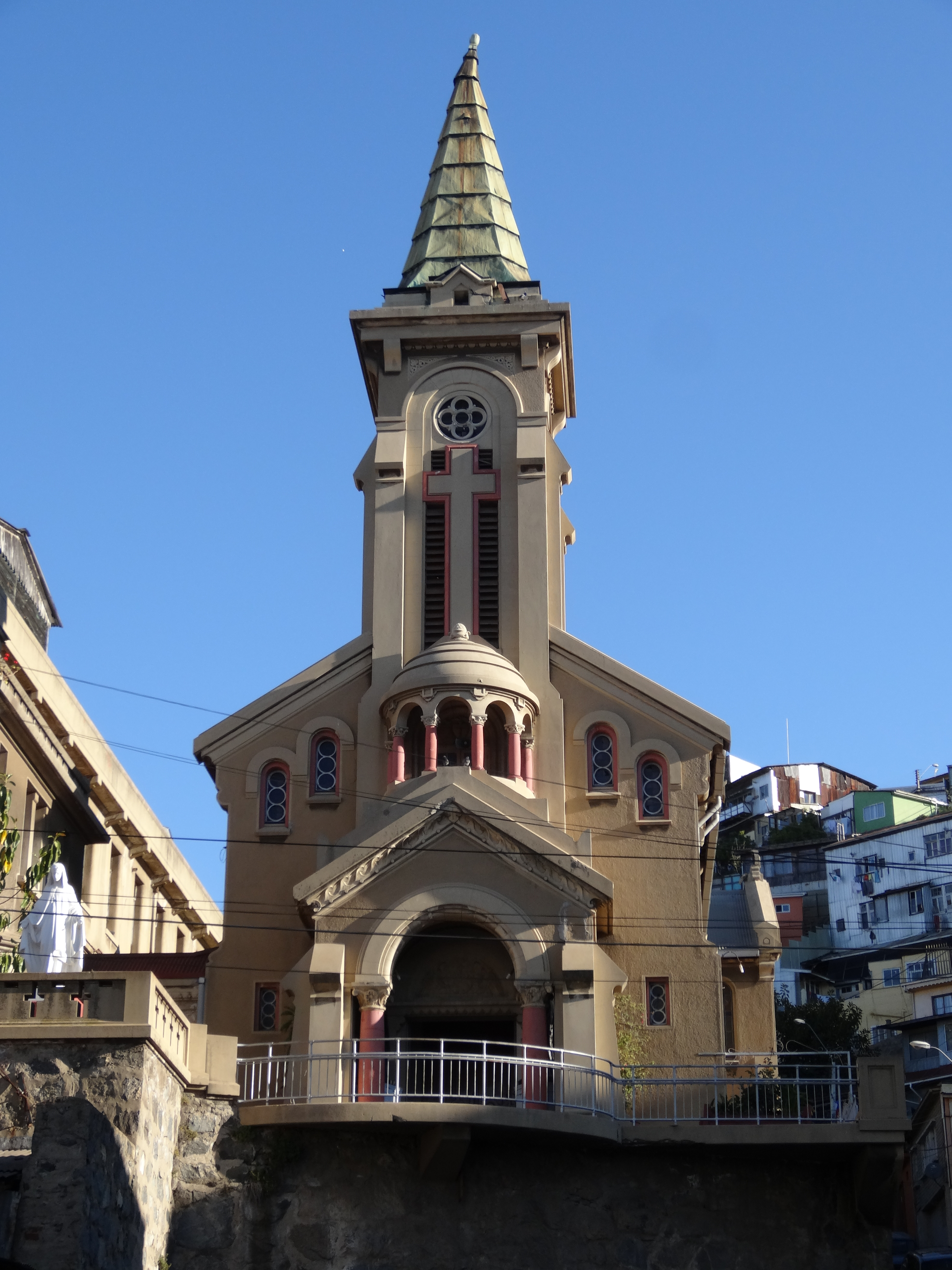

Religion
- Affiliation: Roman Catholic

Location
- Municipality: Valparaíso
- Country: Chile
- Interactive map of Capilla del Carmen

Architecture
- Architects: Roberto Lorca; Oscar Oyaneder

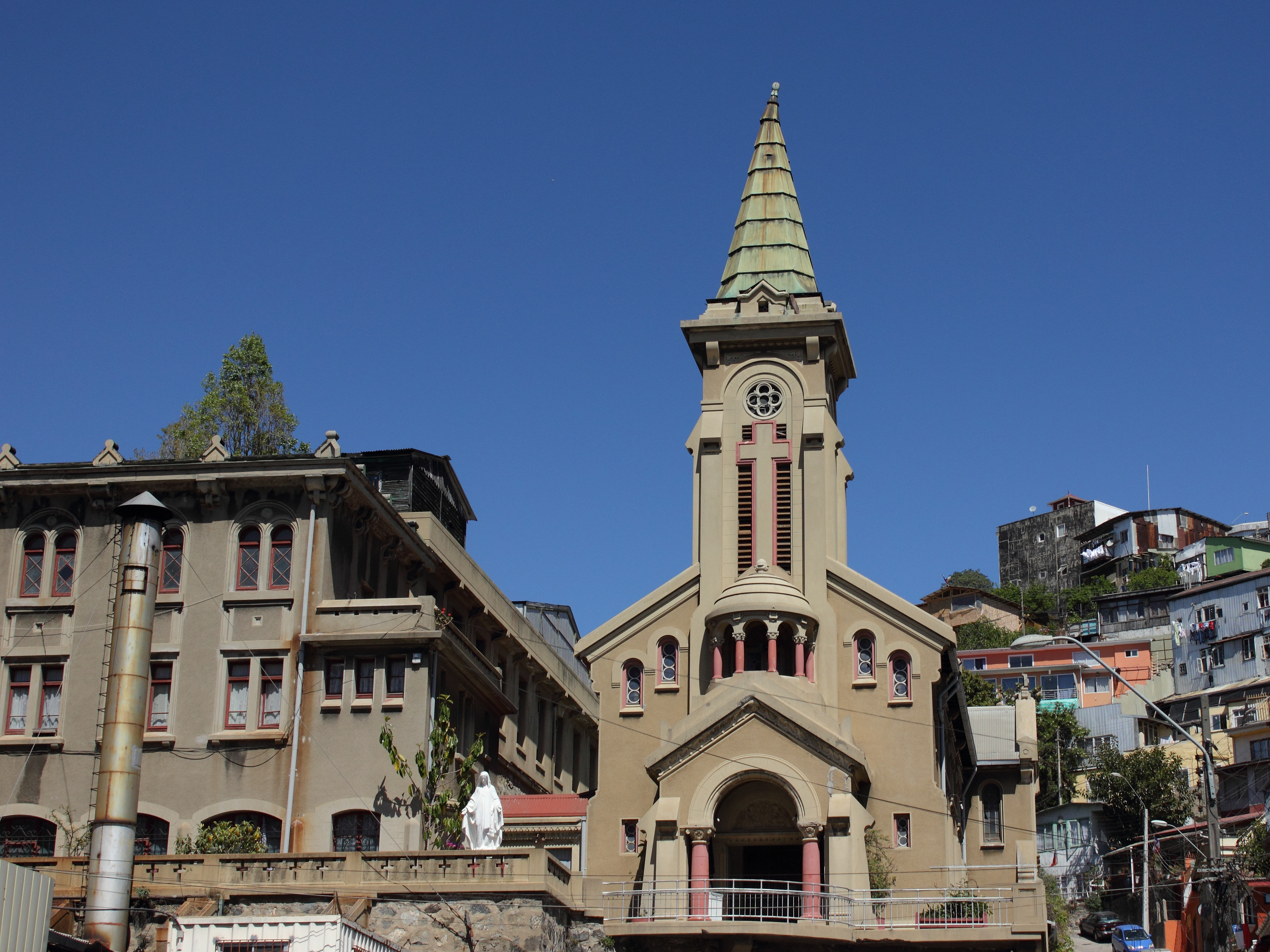
A view of the chapel. The left half of the photo shows the building that was occupied by the Daughters of Charity of Saint Vincent de Paul.

The Capilla del Carmen, also known as Capilla de la Medalla Milagrosa, is a chapel located on the lower flank of El Litre Hill, in El Almendral neighborhood of Valparaíso, Chile. Built in 1928, it was run by the Daughters of Charity of Saint Vincent de Paul, who provided care to patients of the adjacent Hospital Carlos Van Buren until March 2017. The chapel was declared as a National Monument of Chile on May 20, 2003, within the category of Historic Monuments.

== History ==
The Daughters of Charity of Saint Vincent de Paul arrived to Chile on March 15, 1854 from France, under a specific order of Manuel Bulnes for the care and attention of patients in the hospitals. In 1860, they established themselves in Valparaíso, performing services at San Juan de Dios Hospital, presently Carlos Van Buren Hospital.

The chapel was built in 1928, under the supervision of architects Roberto Lorca and Oscar Oyaneder, on land formerly occupied by the oratory of the Hospital Carlos Van Buren, which had been built in 1845.

== Description ==
The church building serves as a terminating vista for the south end of San Ignacio street. It stands on a terrace at the foot of El Litre Hill. Designed in an eclectic historicist style, the church is constructed of reinforced concrete with a wooden roof structure. It has a central nave and two small side aisles.

The gabled porch has an arched entrance and is surmounted by a half-cupola, which is dwarfed by a steepled tower.

The interior of the church contains a polychrome wooden altar and sculptures made in Spain, with stained glasses from that same country. The church contains altars devoted to the Sacred Heart of Jesus, St. Joseph, Our Lady of Mount Carmel, the Immaculate Conception, Crucified Christ and to Our Lady of the Green Scapular.
