= Marine and Coastal Area (Takutai Moana) (Customary Marine Title) Amendment Act 2025 =

Act of Parliament in New Zealand

New Zealand Parliament
- Royal assent: 24 October 2025

Legislative history
- Introduced by: Paul Goldsmith
- First reading: 24 September 2024
- Second reading: 9 October 2025
- Third reading: 21 October 2025
- Passed: 21 October 2025
- Status: Current legislation

The Marine and Coastal Area (Takutai Moana) (Customary Marine Title) Amendment Act 2025 is a New Zealand Act of Parliament which amends the Marine and Coastal Area (Takutai Moana) Act 2011 to limit Māori coastal customary claims. The bill passed its third reading on 21 October 2025 with the support of the governing National, ACT and New Zealand First parties. By contrast, it was opposed by the opposition Labour, Green parties and Te Pāti Māori, which vowed to repeal the legislation if they formed the next government.

== Key provisions ==
The Marine and Coastal Area (Takutai Moana) (Customary Marine Title) Amendment Act 2025 amends the Marine and Coastal Area (Takutai Moana) Act 2011 by inserting new sections relating to customary marine titles. The MACA Amendment Act 2025 limits the ability of parties to make customary marine titles based on the "exclusive use and occupation" of a common and marine coastal areas without "substantial interruption. It also amends the 2011 Act's Sections 58 and 59 to tighten the criteria for making customary marine titles under existing legislation including the Resource Management Act 1991, the Treaty of Waitangi (Fisheries Claims) Settlement Act 1992 and Ngā Rohe Moana o Ngā Hapū o Ngāti Porou Act 2019. The MACA Amendment Act 2025 also outlines the impact of customary marine title decisions before and after the legislation's passage.

== Background ==
=== Foreshore and Seabed Act 2004 ===
Since the signing of the Treaty of Waitangi in February 1840, Māori and the New Zealand Crown have disagreed over indigenous claims to New Zealand's foreshore and seabed. Due to their exclusion from commercial mussel farming, local Māori in the Marlborough Sounds applied to the Māori Land Court in 1997 for a determination of the local foreshore and seabed as Māori customary land. Before the Land Court could release its decision, the High Court of New Zealand ruled that foreshore purchased by the Crown from Māori negated indigenous ownership and that the Crown had always owned the seabed. This decision was subsequently overturned by the Court of Appeal of New Zealand, which ruled in 2002 that the case should be heard at the Māori Land Court.

In response, the Fifth Labour Government passed the contentious Foreshore and Seabed Act 2004 which stated that the Crown owned the foreshore and seabed except for privately owned parts. It also codified public access to the foreshore and seabed for recreational and navigational purposes, protected customary activities since 1840 and allowed landowners who owned dry land near the foreshore, and who had been using part of the foreshore and seabed since 1840, to claim customary territorial rights and apply to the Crown for redress. The Labour Government's passage of the Foreshore and Seabed Act was prompted by pressure from its coalition partner New Zealand First and the opposition National Party, who argued that the Court of Appeal's ruling could cause non-Māori New Zealanders to lose access to beaches, fishing spots and harbours.

=== The Marine and Coastal Area (Takutai Moana) Act 2011 ===
Labour's role in the Foreshore and Seabed Act alienated many Māori including Labour cabinet minister Tariana Turia, who resigned from the party and founded the Māori Party. The Māori Party subsequently allied itself with the National Party, which won the 2008 New Zealand general election. In 2009 the Fifth National Government, as part of its confidence and supply agreement with the Māori Party, announced a review of the Foreshore and Seabed Act. In 2010, the National-led government announced it would repeal the Foreshore and Seabed Act. In 2011, Parliament passed the Marine and Coastal Area (Takutai Moana) Act 2011, which replaced Crown ownership of the foreshore and seabed with a "no ownership" regime. The MACA Act also allowed Māori to apply to the courts or Crown for customary rights and ownership over certain areas provided they did not interfere with existing rights and activities such as fishing, aquaculture and public access.

=== The threshold dispute ===
Following a meeting between Treaty Negotiations Minister Paul Goldsmith and Oceans Fisheries Minister Shane Jones and seafood industry representatives on 21 May 2024, Goldsmith confirmed that the Sixth National Government would disregard a 2023 Court of Appeal ruling that lowered the threshold for proving Māori customary marine title claims. He also announced that the Government would amend section 58 of the Marine and Coastal Area (Takutai Moana) Act 2011 to require marine title claimants to prove they had continual exclusive use and ownership of the area since 1840. This law change was part of National's coalition agreement with New Zealand First. In response, Te Pāti Māori MP Tākuta Ferris accused the Government of taking away Māori rights and warned that the Government should expect protests.

In mid-September 2024, the Waitangi Tribunal released its initial report into the proposed changes to the MACA Act 2011. It criticised the Government for ignoring official advice, failing to consult Māori and for breaching several principles including active protection and good governance. In October, the Attorney-General Judith Collins appealed the Court of Appeal's 2023 decision to lower the threshold for proving Māori customary foreshore and seabed claims to the Supreme Court of New Zealand. On 2 December, the Supreme Court upheld the Attorney-General's appeal, ruling that the lower court had erred in its approach to interpreting the threshold within the framework of the Marine and Coastal Area (Takutai Moana) Act 2011.

== Legislative history ==
The Marine and Coastal Area (Takutai Moana) (Customary Marine Title) Amendment Bill passed its first reading on 24 September 2024 and was referred to the justice select committee that same day.

On 3 December 2024, the justice select committee released its report and recommended that the legislation be progressed with some minor technical amendments. Both the Labour and Green parties issued minority reports disagreeing with the proposed bill. Labour opposed the bill on the grounds that the Government had failed to consult with Māori and that it contravened both the National Party's constitutional provision to uphold the Treaty of Waitangi and undermined Crown-Māori relations. The Greens opposed the proposed bill on the grounds that the Government had failed to consult with Māori and that it undermined Māori efforts to exercise their indigenous rights to the foreshore and seabed.

On 5 August 2025, Goldsmith confirmed that the Government would proceed with the bill through Parliament despite a Supreme Court ruling questioning its necessity. The Māori tribe Ngai Tahu and the opposition Labour Party criticised the proposed bill, saying that it would make it harder for Māori to argue for their customary rights in court.

The MACA Amendment Bill passed its second reading on 9 October. It passed the Committee of the Whole House on 14 October.

On 21 October, the MACA Amendment Bill passed its third reading, becoming law. The bill was supported by the governing National, ACT and New Zealand First parties but was opposed by the opposition Labour, Green parties and Te Pāti Māori, which vowed to repeal the legislation if they formed the next government. On 22 October, Te Pāti Māori MPs Debbie Ngarewa-Packer and Tākuta Ferris burnt a copy of the MACA bill in protest.
