= Natives Land Act =

Natives Land Act may refer to:

- Native Lands Act 1865 of New Zealand
- Natives Land Act, 1913 of South Africa
