= Terminating vista =

Building or monument at the end of a view

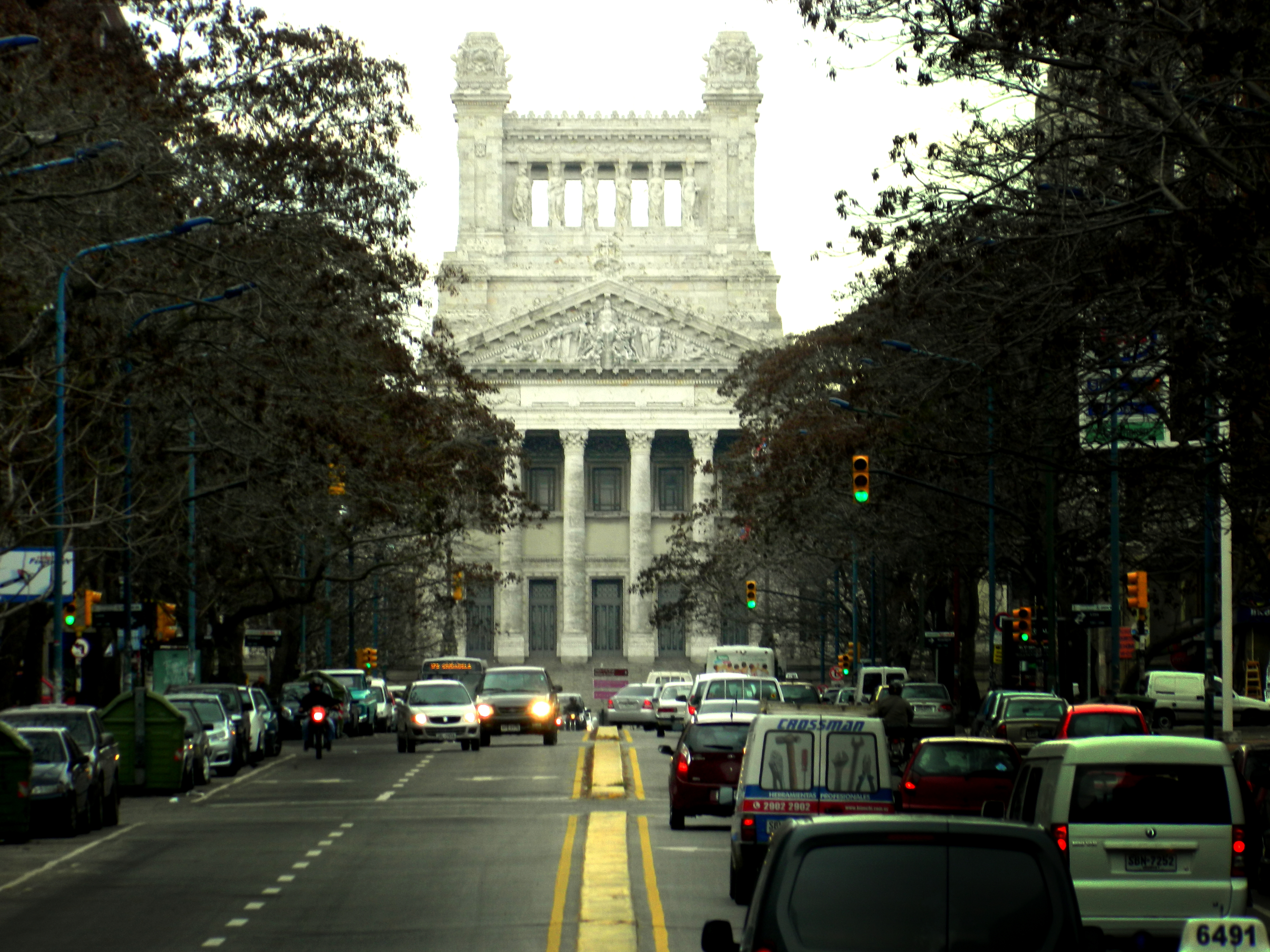
The Legislative Palace of Uruguay in Montevideo completes the terminating vista of Libertador Avenue.

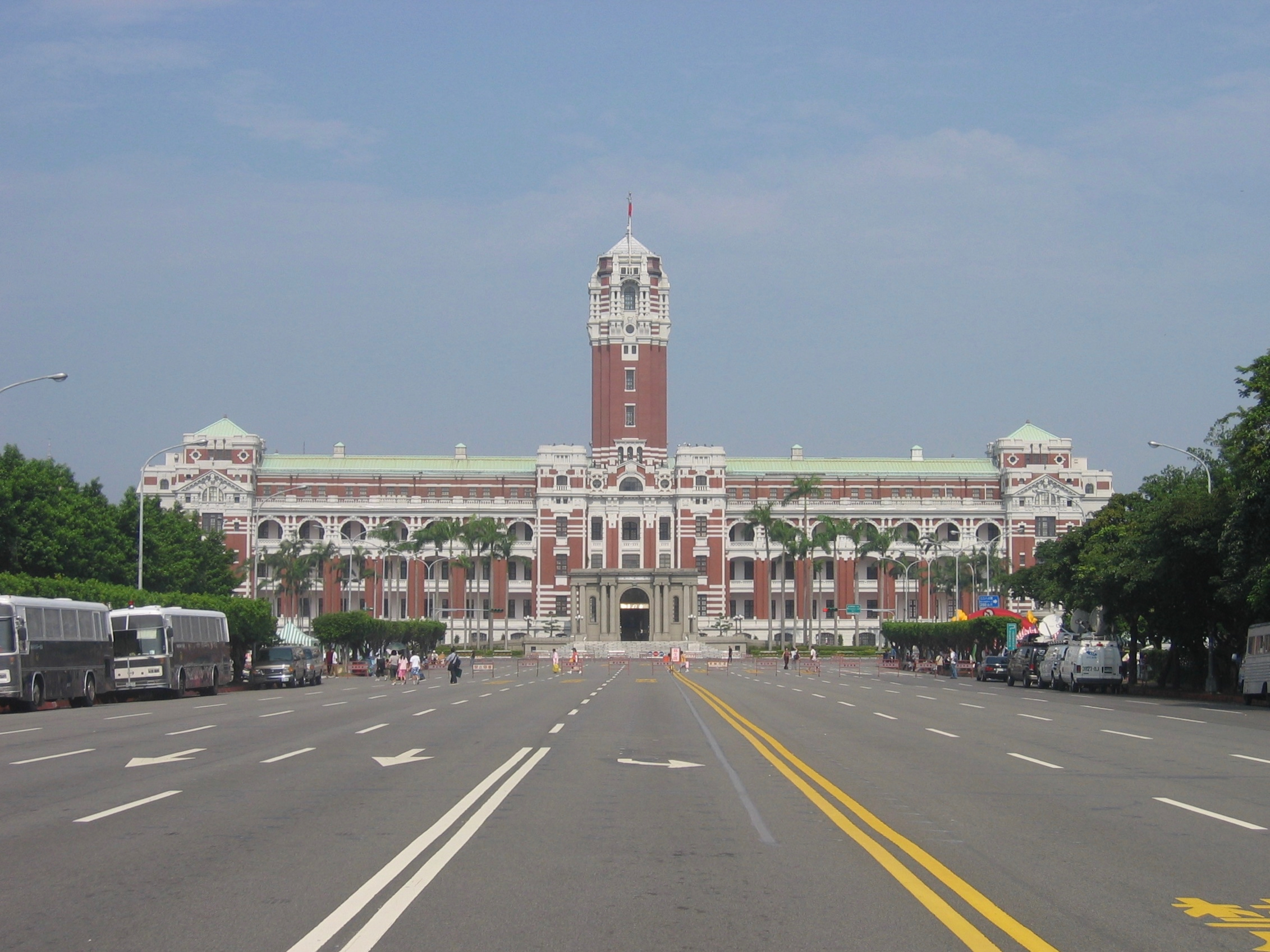
The Presidential Office Building in Taipei serves as the terminating vista for Ketagalan Boulevard.

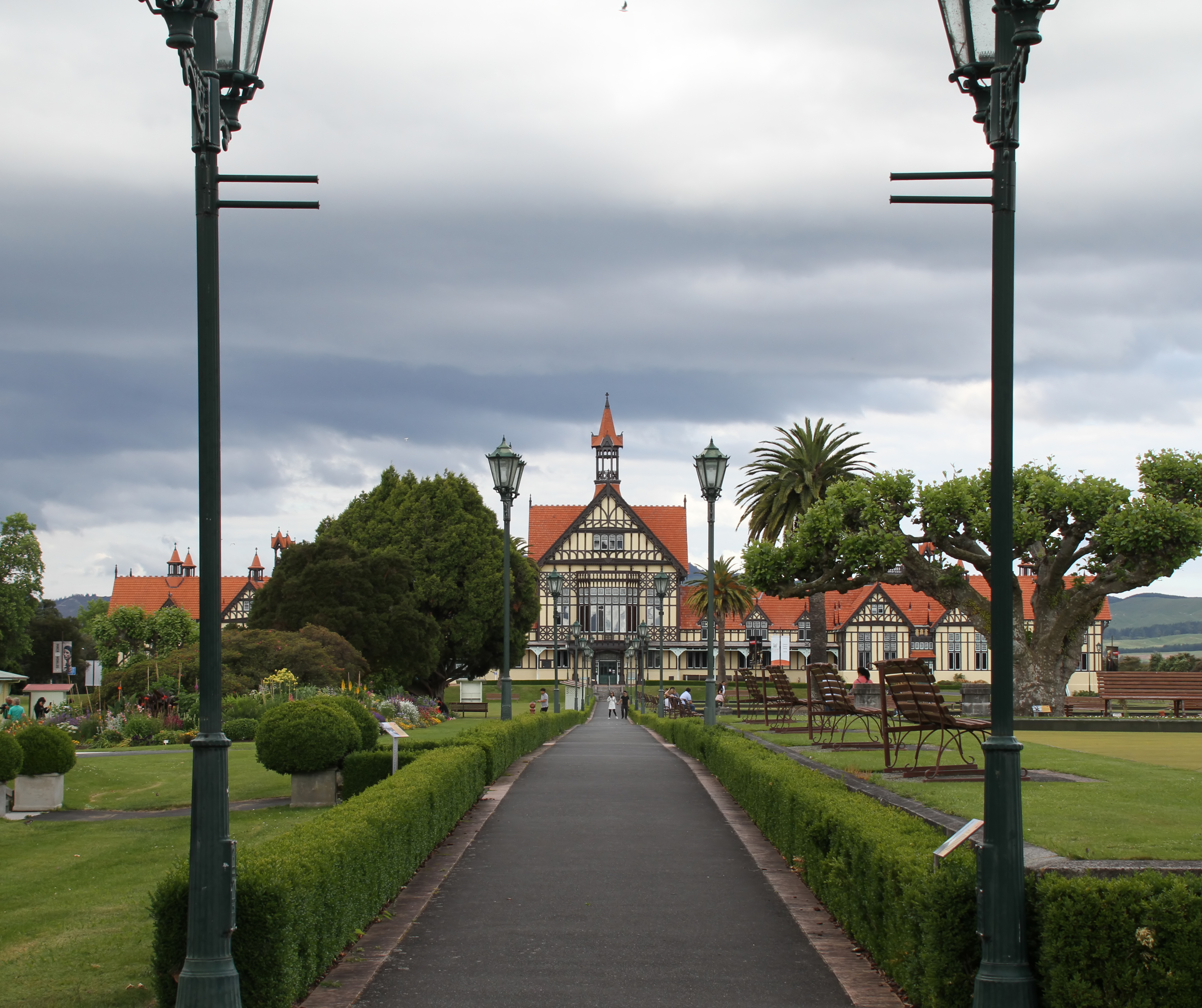
Rotorua Museum is the terminating vista of the main walkway through Government Gardens in Rotorua, New Zealand.

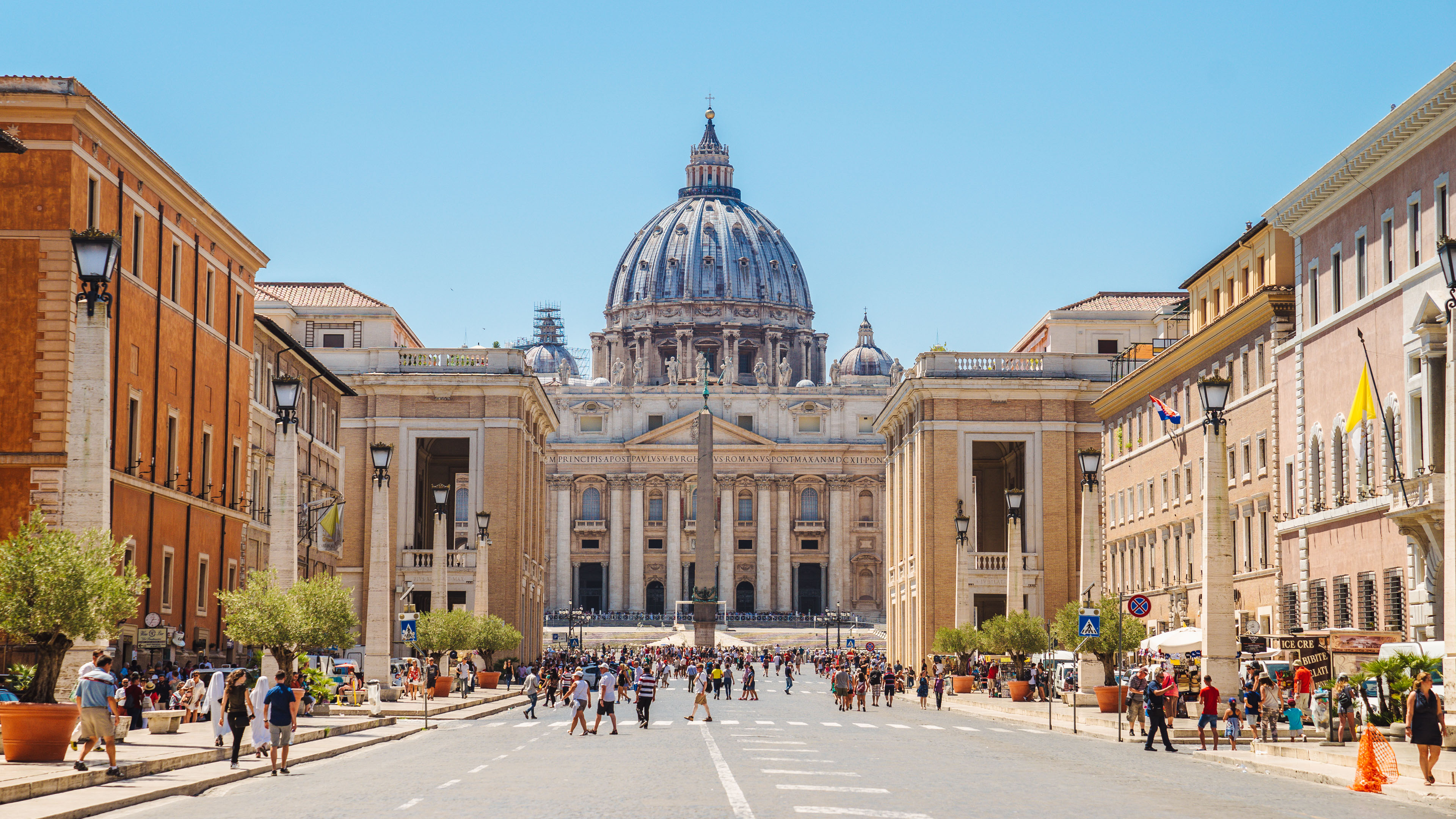
Ground level view of the Via della Conciliazione in Rome, of which St. Peter's Square is both the terminating vista and the border with the Vatican.

In urban design, a terminating vista is a building or an object such as a monument that stands within view in the sightline or at the end or the middle of a road.

== Function ==
Terminating vistas are considered an important method of adding aesthetic appeal to a city, and to emphasize important structures or monuments. Common terminating vistas include government buildings, war memorials, courthouses and other important structures. Standing at the end of a street adds grandeur to a structure, and legislature and palaces are thus often placed in such a locale. Also, especially on east–west streets, terminating vistas provide sunshade for pedestrians.

A notable disadvantage of terminating vistas is that they make traffic more complicated and prevent a simple grid system of city blocks. To accommodate them, large traffic circles or other techniques have to be employed to manage traffic around the monument. Cities on a grid system such as New York City thus have few terminating vistas. A prominent NYC exception is the controversial MetLife Building, which was built on top of Park Avenue.

== Examples of terminating vistas ==
A city particularly known for its terminating vistas is Paris, where many of the largest streets end in monuments and structures such as the Arc de Triomphe, Palais Garnier or the Panthéon. Another well-known example is Washington, D.C., where, most notably, the United States Capitol provides the terminating vista for North, South, and East Capitol Streets, as well as the National Mall and either side of Delaware, New Jersey, Maryland, and Pennsylvania Avenues (which are all bisected by the Capitol, turning into pedestrian walkways around the edifice). Other notable terminating vistas include Buckingham Palace, located at the end of The Mall, and St. Peter's Square, at the end of Via della Conciliazione.

Philadelphia's City Hall is another example, situated on Penn Square where Broad and Market Streets intersect. The two streets form the north–south and east–west axes of the city's core grid, leaving the large masonry structure visible from all sections of the city.

An unusual situation exists on Bay Street in Toronto, where the clock tower of Old City Hall lies at the northern end of the segment south of Queen Street West. However, Bay Street is a through street that curves to the west, intersecting Queen Street West at a 45-degree angle before curving back north along the western edge of Old City Hall and continuing towards Davenport Road. In a similar manner, the Thomson Building and Munich Re Centre office towers act as a vista for the northern section of Bay Street heading south.
