= Blue Baths =

Heritage building in New Zealand

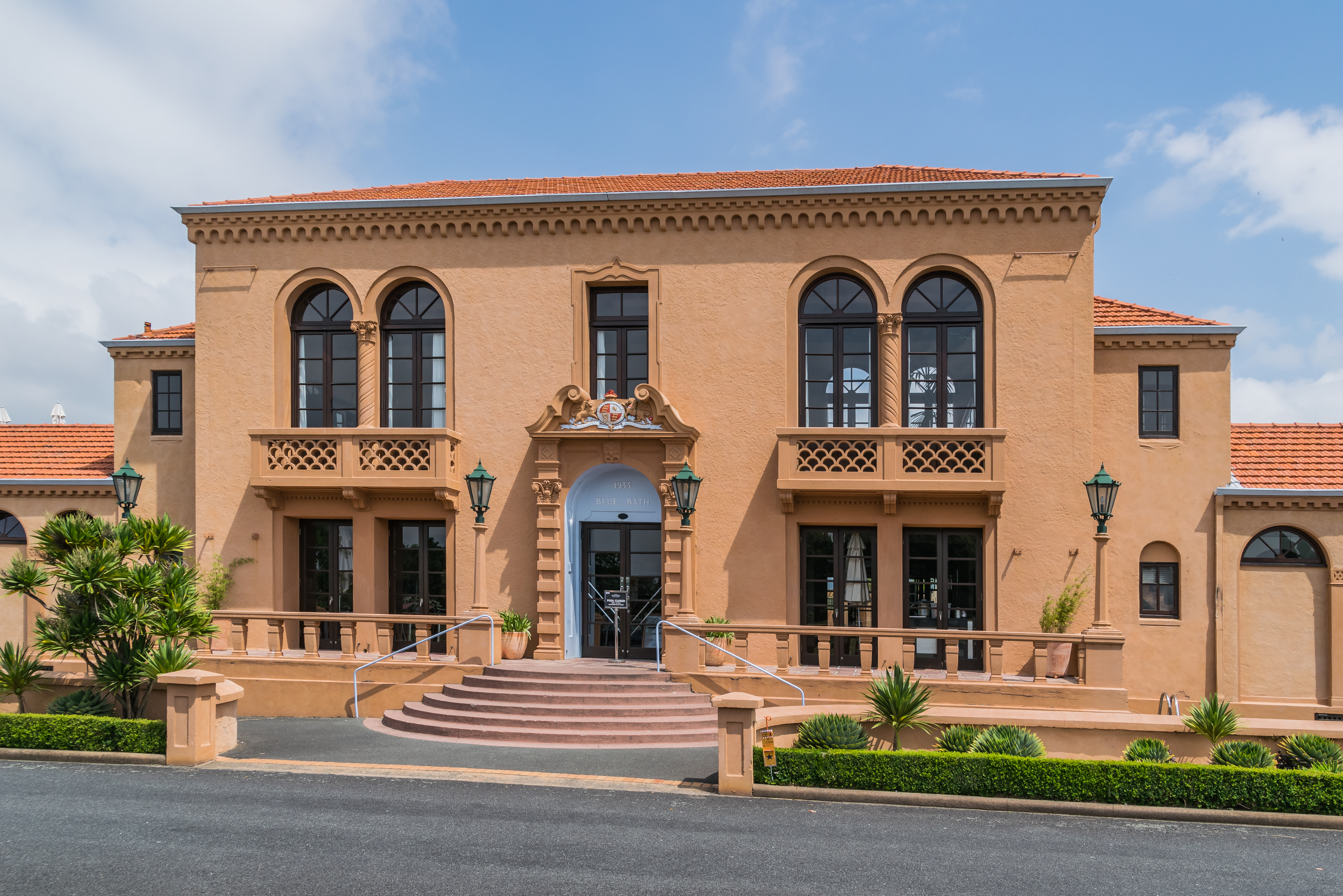
- Interactive map of the Blue Baths area

General information
- Status: Temporarily closed
- Architectural style: Spanish Mission style
- Location: 38°08′10″S 176°15′27″E, Government Gardens, Rotorua, New Zealand

Technical details
- Structural system: Reinforced concrete

Design and construction
- Architect: John Thomas Mair
- Known for: Geothermal baths

Heritage New Zealand – Category 1
- Designated: 25 June 1992
- Reference no.: 5394

The Blue Baths is a heritage geothermal baths building in Rotorua, in the North Island of New Zealand. The building is designed in the Spanish Mission style. It is listed as a Category 1 Historic Place by Heritage New Zealand.

The first Blue Baths at the Government Gardens site were opened in 1886, and stood for over 40 years before being demolished in 1932 when the present building was constructed alongside.

Construction of the new building was well advanced by August 1932.

On 26 January 2021, the Blue Baths was closed to the public after a seismic assessment found the building met only 15 percent of the strength requirements for new buildings.
