= Te Ture Whenua Māori Act 1993 =

Act of Parliament in New Zealand

Te Ture Whenua Māori Act 1993 / Māori Land Act 1993

New Zealand Parliament
- Long title: An Act to reform the laws relating to Māori land in accordance with the principles set out in the Preamble to this Act.
- Commenced: 1 July 1993

Legislative history
- Passed: 1993

Related legislation
- Maori Affairs Act 1953
- Status: Current legislation

Te Ture Whenua Māori Act 1993 (or the Māori Land Act 1993) is a statute of the Parliament of New Zealand to "reform the laws relating to Māori land in accordance with the principles set out in the Preamble". These principles "reaffirm" the Treaty of Waitangi "relationship between the Māori people and the Crown" and "recognise that land is taonga tuku iho of special significance to Māori people". To that end, the principles "promote the retention of ... land in the hands of its owners, their whanau, and their hapu, and to protect wahi tapu". Further, they "facilitate the occupation, development, and utilisation of that land for the benefit of its owners, their whanau, and their hapu".

== Background ==
Te Ture Whenua Māori Act replaced the Maori Affairs Act 1953 and is administered by Te Puni Kōkiri (the Ministry of Māori Development). Under previous acts, like the Native Act 1894, any communally owned Māori land could be converted to freehold land (sometimes automatically). Under this act, the Māori Land Court can "determine and declare, by a status order, the particular status of any parcel of land".

== Provisions ==
=== Powers to the Māori Land Court ===
The Treaty of Waitangi (article 2) confirms Māori customary title (recognises that when a state acquires governance over another country, the pre-existing rights of the indigenous population remain) to the land. Te Ture Whenua Māori Act 1993 gives the Māori Land Court the jurisdiction to consider this claim. Without limiting any rights of the High Court to make determinations, the Māori Land Court may declare the particular status of any land. For the purposes of the act, all New Zealand land has one of six statuses:

- Māori customary land
- Māori freehold land
- General land owned by Māori
- General land
- Crown land
- Crown land reserved for Māori.

For example, "land that is held by Māori in accordance with tikanga Māori" may be declared "Māori customary land". There are limitations to acquiring or losing this status and the status of Māori freehold land.

=== Powers to owners ===
The act provides:

- New forms of trusts
- Ability to incorporate (so that owners have all the powers of a body corporate)
- Promotes groups of buildings that allow Māori to live sustainably on their land (papakainga)

Also provides for a variety of trusts which address ownership in a variety of different ways.

=== Restrictions on transferring ownership of Māori land ===
More powers are given to the Māori Land Court for enforcing when land is allowed to change hands. Land is preferably transferred to descendants of the owners.

== Calls to change the act ==
There have been calls to have the act changed in response to the New Zealand foreshore and seabed controversy. Green Party MP Metiria Turei advocated amending the act "so that any customary title in foreshore and seabed could not then be turned by the court into private title".

The legislation was reviewed in 2015 and new changes to the act recommended. A proposed bill introduced to parliament in 2016 was controversial and it was ultimately withdrawn by the new Minister of Māori Development. Targeted amendments were passed in 2020 instead.
