= Government Gardens =

Public park in Rotorua, New Zealand

Coordinates: 38°08′06″S 176°15′29″E

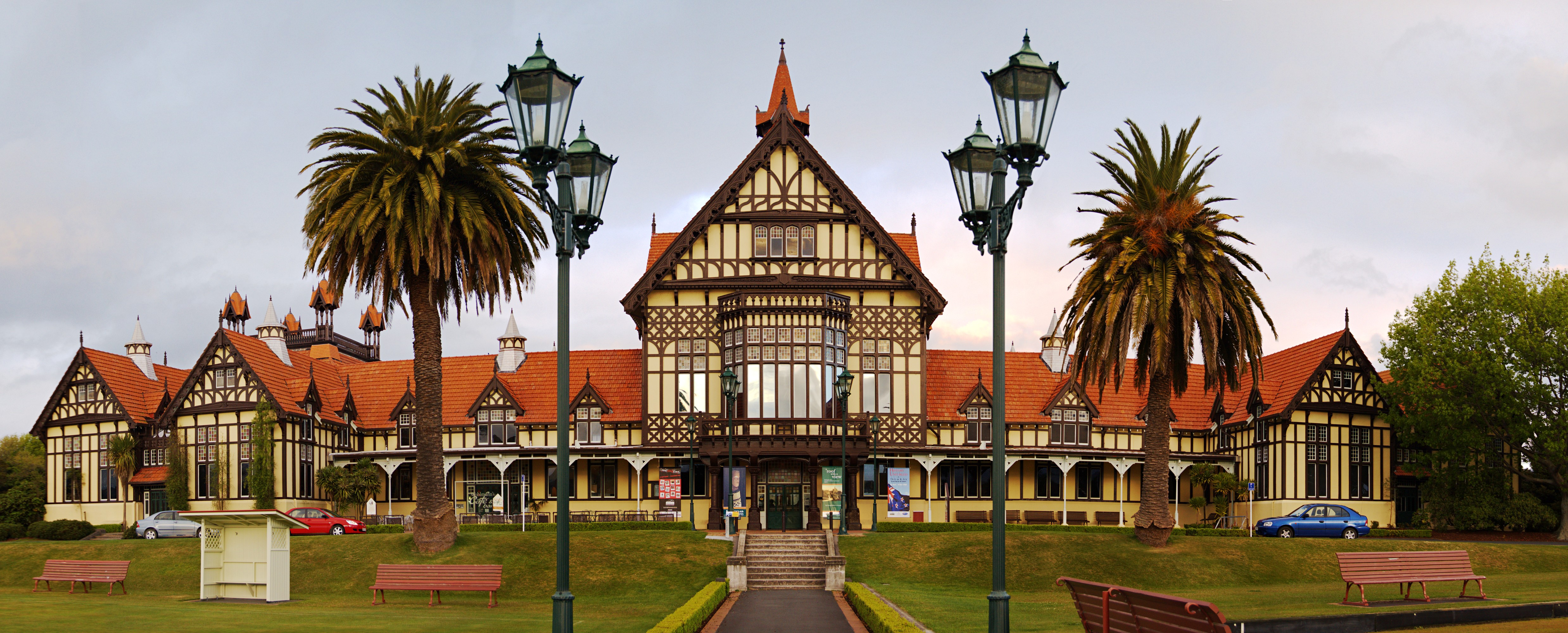
View in Government Gardens with the timber-framed Rotorua Museum, previously the Bath House

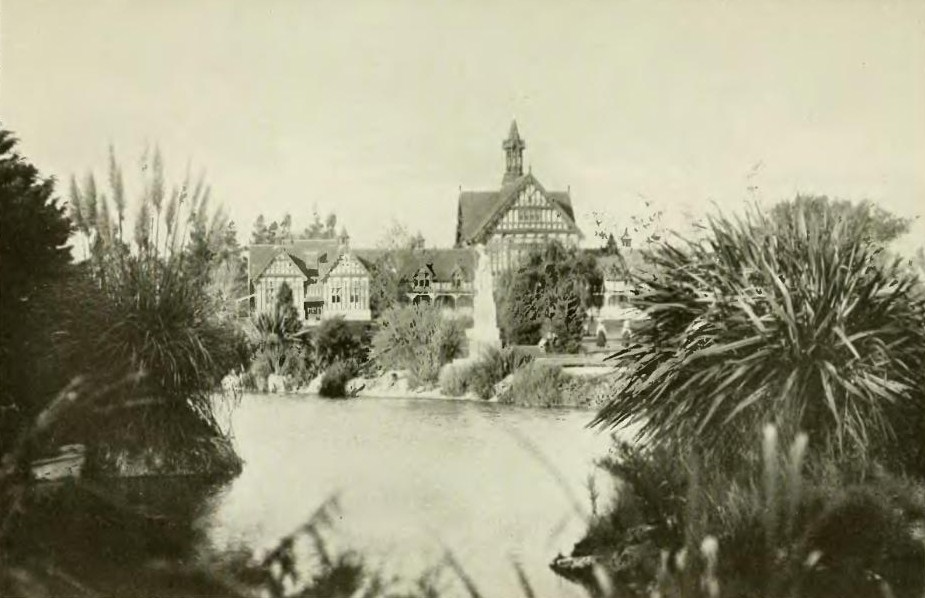
Historic view of Government Gardens with the ornamental lake and the Bath House

The Government Gardens is a public park, partly laid out as gardens, located beside Lake Rotorua in central Rotorua, Bay of Plenty, North Island, New Zealand. It was built by the government as a tourism attraction, and is still a major tourism destination in New Zealand.

== Facilities ==
The Rotorua Museum, housed in the former Bath House building, looks over the Government Gardens. There are sports facilities, including the Blue Baths swimming pool, a bowling green, and a croquet lawn. There is also a bandstand. The Polynesian Spa is close by, beside Lake Rotorua.

== History ==
Part of the site was known to the Māori people as Paepaehakumanu and the northern part as Motutara. The area known as Paepaehakumanu was a bird-snaring ground, which led to its name. The area is of historical significance to the local Maori, with battles having been fought here. The Maori gave 50 acres of the land to the British Crown in the late 1800s. The combined Paepaehakumanu and Motutara area became known as the Sanatorium Reserve, or more commonly, the Government Gardens.

The New Zealand Government opened a large bath house here in 1908. A second building, the Blue Baths, opened in 1933, amidst much controversy, as mixed bathing was accommodated. The Blue Baths were closed in 1982, and restored in 1999–2000. The original 1908 Bath House closed to bathing in 1966. The building was extensively renovated in 1995 and converted into a museum.

=== Heritage registrations ===
A number of items are covered by formal registrations by Heritage New Zealand. The former Bath House, now Rotorua Museum, and the Blue Baths have Category I registrations. Four structures have Category II registrations, including the Prince's Arch and Gateway which was built for the 1901 royal visit of the Duke and Duchess of York; this structure is now unique in New Zealand. The area as a whole is also covered by a Historic Area registration.

Photo	Name	Category	Description
	Former Bath House, now Rotorua Museum	Category I	half-timbered Elizabethan Revival building
	Blue Baths	Category I	Spanish Mission-style bath house
	Prince's Arch and Gateway	Category II	archway resembling a royal crown built for the royal visit in 1901
	Te Runanga Tea Pavilion and Ticket Office	Category II	tea kiosk and an adjacent small octagonal building that served as a ticket office
	Rotunda	Category II	band rotunda
	Gardener's Cottage	Category II	cottage for the reserve's gardener
	Rotorua Government Gardens	Historic Area	heritage registration covering the whole setting
	Arawa War Memorial	Historic Monument	World War I memorial by William Henry Feldon unveiled in 1927 by the Duke of York (later King George VI.)
