= Rotorua Museum =

Museum in Rotorua, New Zealand

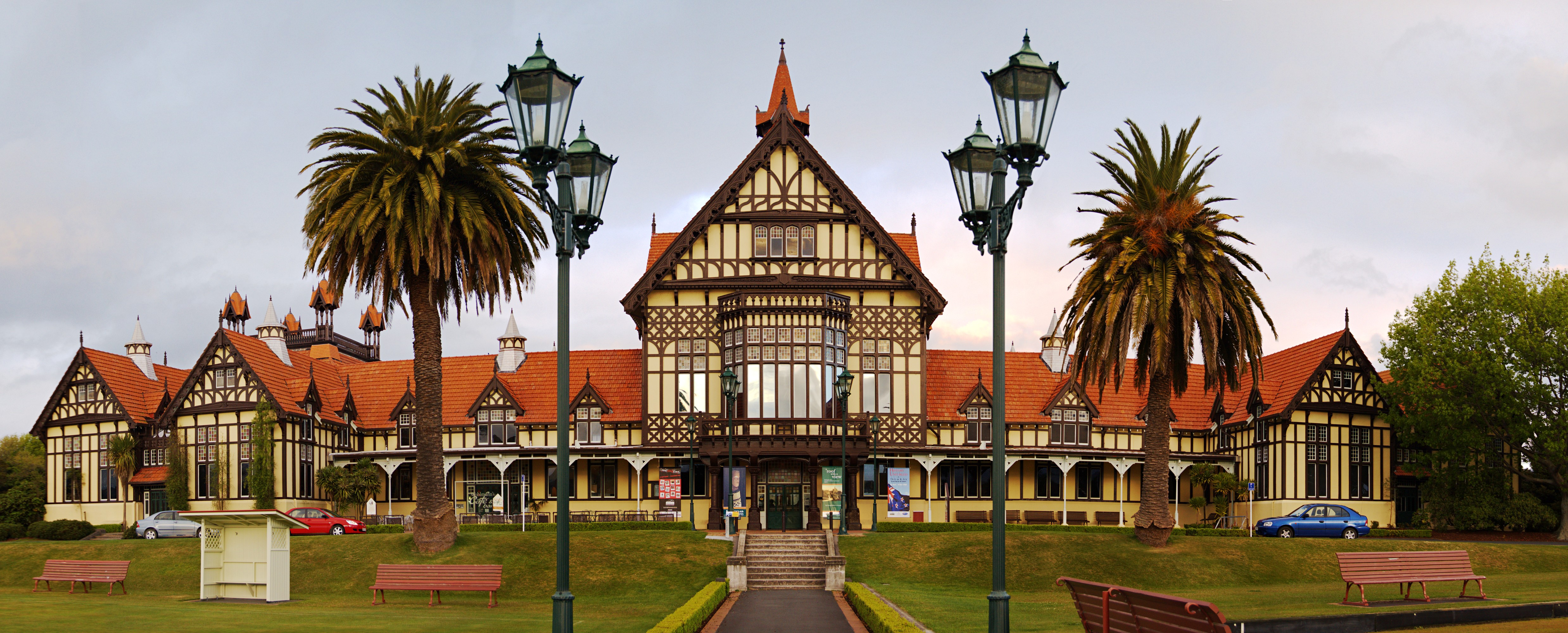
- Te Whare Taonga o Te Arawa
- Former name: Rotorua Museum of Art & History Te Whare Taonga o Te Arawa
- Established: November 1979; 46 years ago
- Location: Rotorua
- Coordinates: 38.1356°S 176.2591°E
- Type: Art museum, Taonga, Social History
- Director: Stewart Brown
- Website: www.rotoruamuseum.co.nz

Heritage New Zealand – Category 1
- Designated: 4 April 1985
- Reference no.: 141

The Rotorua Museum (Māori: Te Whare Taonga o Te Arawa) is a local museum and art gallery located in the Government Gardens near the centre of Rotorua, New Zealand. It is dedicated to art culture and heritage of Rotorua and wider New Zealand. Its collections include over 2,000 Māori taonga.

The museum has been closed since 2016 because of damage from the Kaikōura earthquake. Due to its listing on Heritage New Zealand list of historic sites as a Category 1 Historic Place (appointed in 1985), the museum is undergoing strengthening and restoration.

== History ==
=== Early history ===
In the late 19th century, there was growing interest among tourists to visit and bathe in the thermal pools located near the Pink and White Terraces. As a result, in 1880, the government established Rotorua as a tourist resort. In 1886, the active volcano of Tarawera erupted, destoying a number of villages and the Pink and White Terraces.

On 22 November 1880, Judge F.D. Fenton met with 47 Māori leaders to discuss a proposal supporting the creation of a township, resulting in Ngāti Whakaue gifting 50 acres of land along the southern area of Lake Rotorua. This area, formerly known as the Sanatorium Reserve, is today named the Government Gardens, and is the land that the Rotorua Museum stands on. The gift by Ngāti Whakaue was 'hei oranga mo nga iwi katoa o te Ao' – 'for the benefit of the people of the world.'

=== The Bath House ===
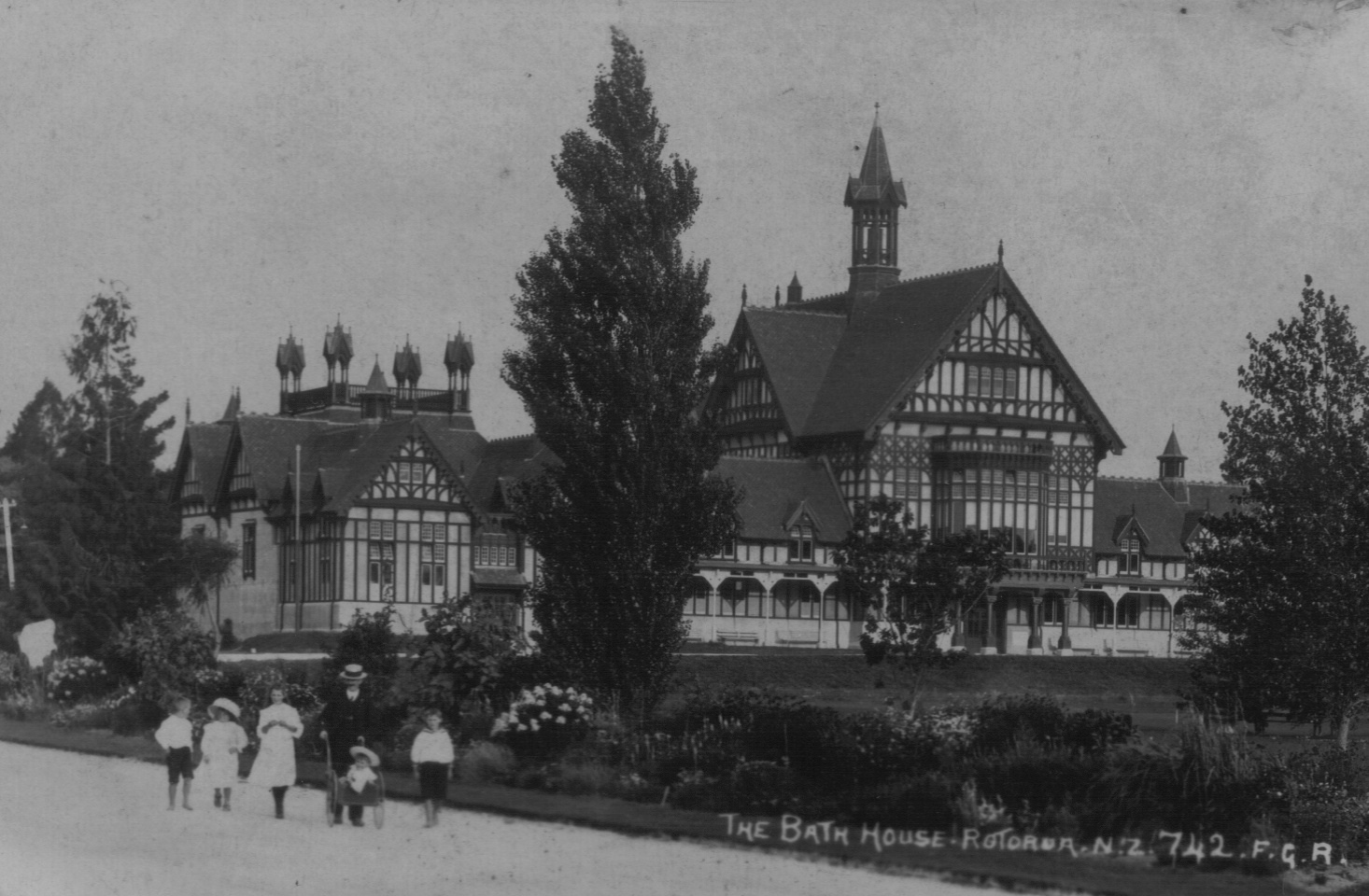
Bath House Rotorua, before 1913

In Europe, spas had become fashionable meeting places for the middle and upper classes to treat illnesses, diseases, or simply as a social activity. As such, the New Zealand government hoped that the development of a Bath House would appeal to wealthy tourists, particularly from the Northern hemisphere, who could afford to stay in Rotorua for two or three weeks and use the baths to treat their physical or psychological needs.

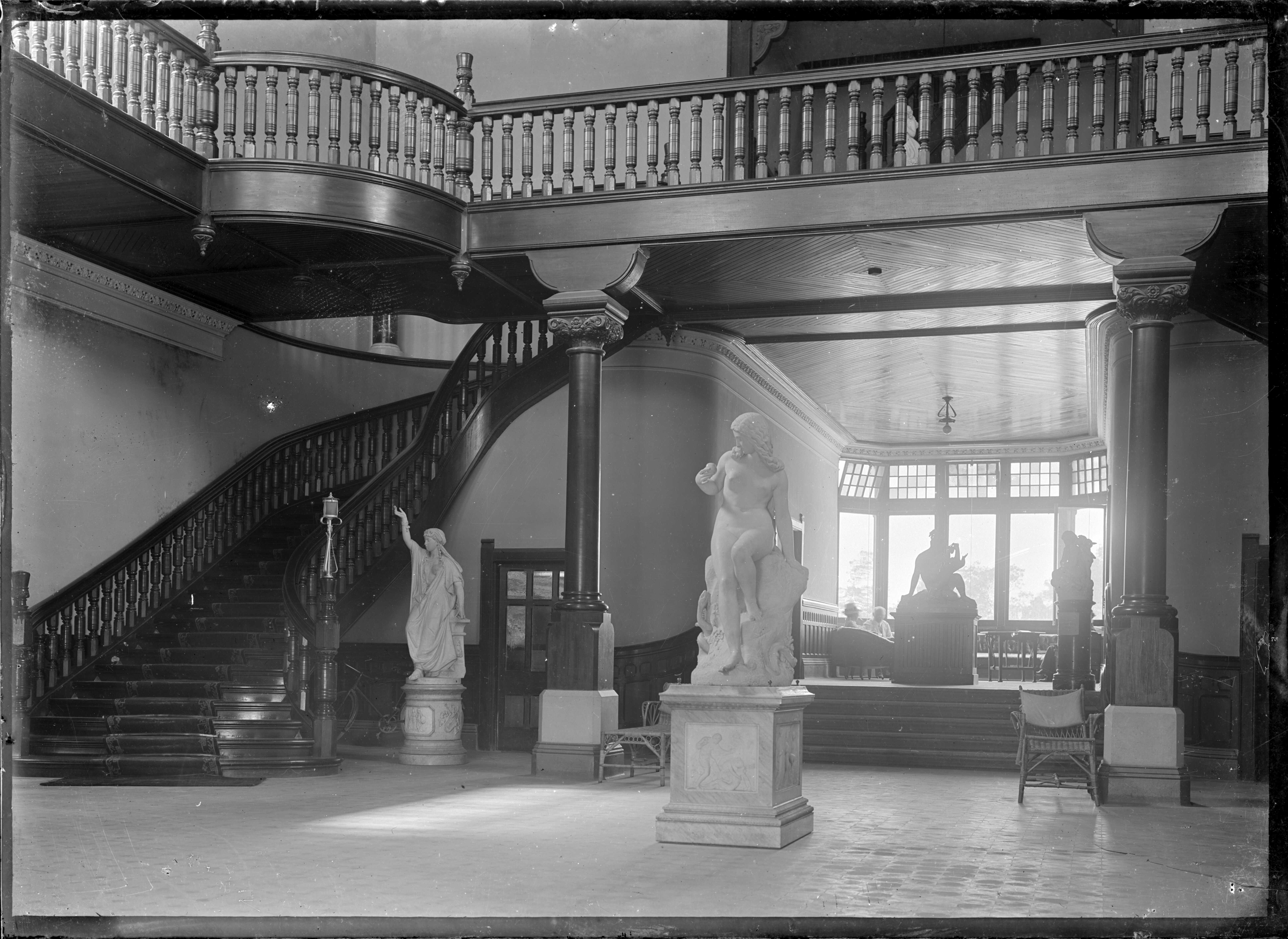
The Bath House interior, c.1916

The newly-created Department of Tourist and Health Resorts, established in 1902, was tasked with constructing the Bath House, which took two years to build, between 1906 and 1908, and cost £40,000. The Bath House opened in 1908 by Prime Minister Joseph Ward. It was New Zealand's first spa facility, and was noted as the first major investment in the New Zealand tourism industry by the government.

The Bath House was known for its therapeutic treatments using water sourced from surrounding thermal springs. The bath treatments were thought to be able to successfully treat a series of illnesses such as. Rheumatism, Indigestion, Constipation, Obesity, Sciatica, Nerve Trouble, Spinal Curvature, and Neuritis. The north wing accommodated male patients, while women were treated in the south wing.

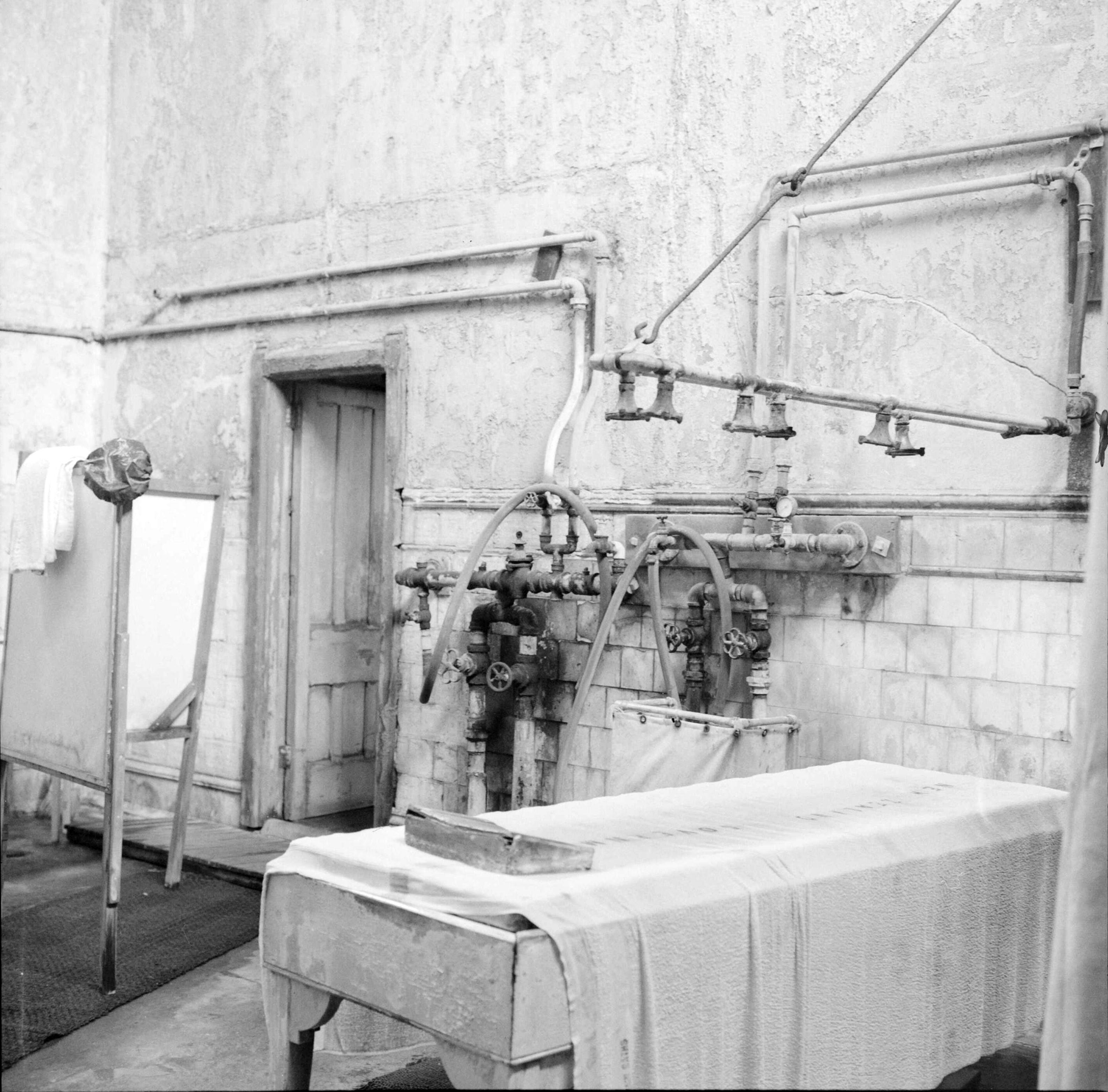
One of the rooms in the Bath House

Efforts were made from the beginning to attract international interest, with Admiral Sperry, the commander of the American Atlantic Fleet, invited to participate in the opening ceremony. At its peak, it attracted between 60,000 and 80,000 visitors annually. These numbers reflect the popularity of the site given that Rotorua's population was 4,700 in 1926, growing to 12,302 by 1956 – a decade before the Bath House closed.

By the 1940s, spa treatments greatly declined in popularity, with medical professionals advising that they should be complementary to work done in hospitals, rather than relying on them as a cure-all solution. Rotorua's new Director of Physical Medicine, Dr. G.A.Q Lennane, condemned the promotion of spas as a substantial treatment for illnesses, stating that the spa conception was responsible for the delayed knowledge of the treatment of rheumatic diseases. They called for the exploitation of Rotorua's mineral waters to stop and for rational science to be used instead. By 1963, the Rotorua City Council took ownership of the Bath House, and in 1966, all treatments were transferred to the nearby Queen Elizabeth Hospital. Concurrently, due to the sulfur corroding the metal piping, the building became too difficult to maintain, and it closed down in 1966.

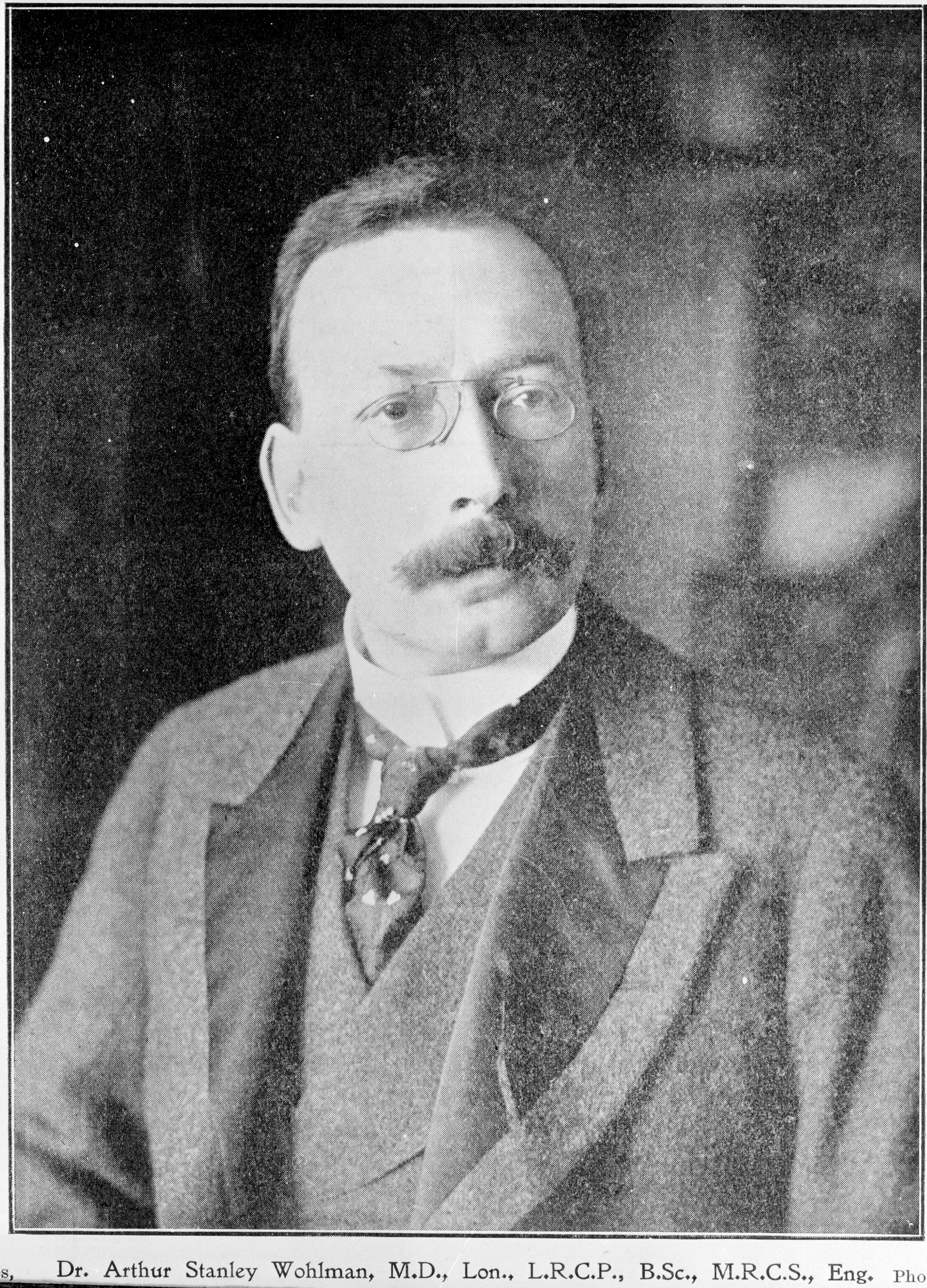
Arthur Stanley Wohlmann

=== Rotorua's first balneologist ===
In 1902, Dr Arthur Wohlmann, an expert in balneotherapy, was employed by the Department of Tourist and Health Resorts, subsequently leaving his home in London to move to Rotorua. He was appointed as the first Government balneologist. Wohlmann had worked at the Royal Hospital at Bath and was to bring his experience and expertise to advise on the development of thermal spas.

Despite Wohlmann being considered the most distinguished balneologist available, he was fired by the government in 1912 due to the fact they could pay a younger and less experienced balneologist for half the price.

=== The museum's origins ===
The Rotorua Museum is now housed in the former Bath House building. Rotorua Museum opened in the south wing of the Bath House in 1969; Rotorua Art Gallery opened in the north wing in 1977. In 1988, the Museum and Gallery combined to form the Rotorua Museum of Art and History Te Whare Taonga o Te Arawa.

Up until 1990, there was a nightclub and two licensed restaurants, one upstairs and one downstairs, that occupied parts of the building.

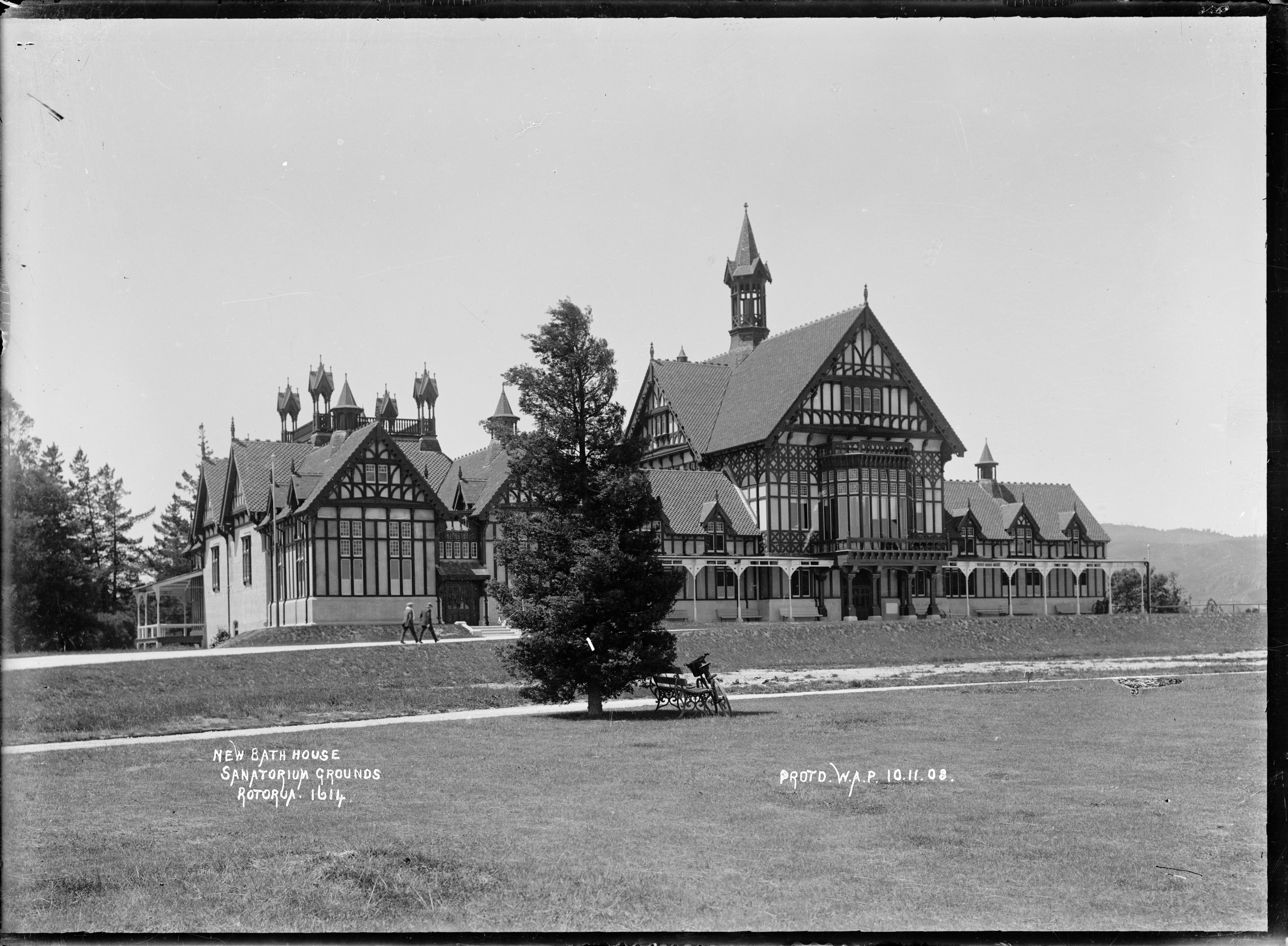
Photograph of the original building, taken in 1908

== Rotorua Museum Bath House exhibition ==
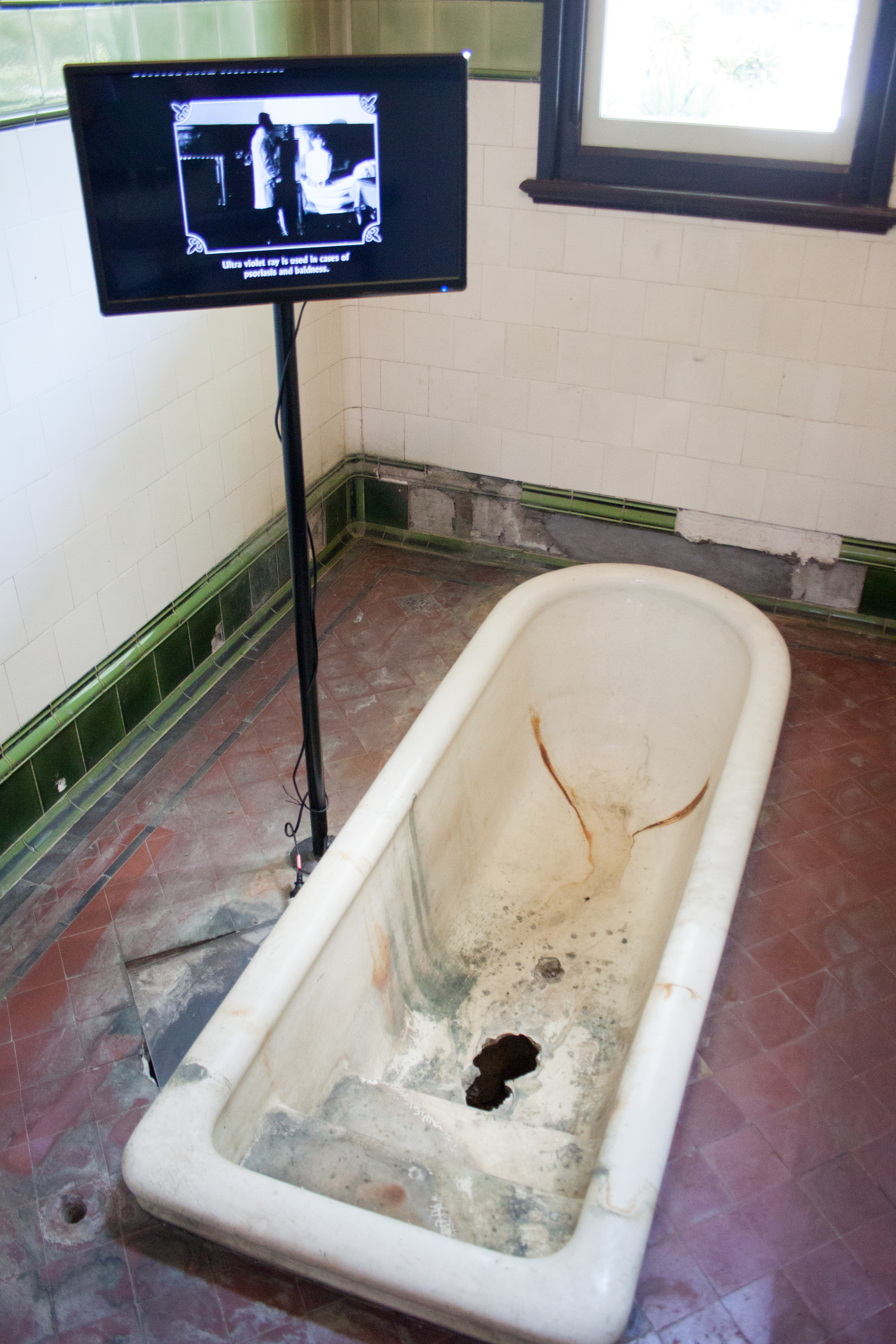

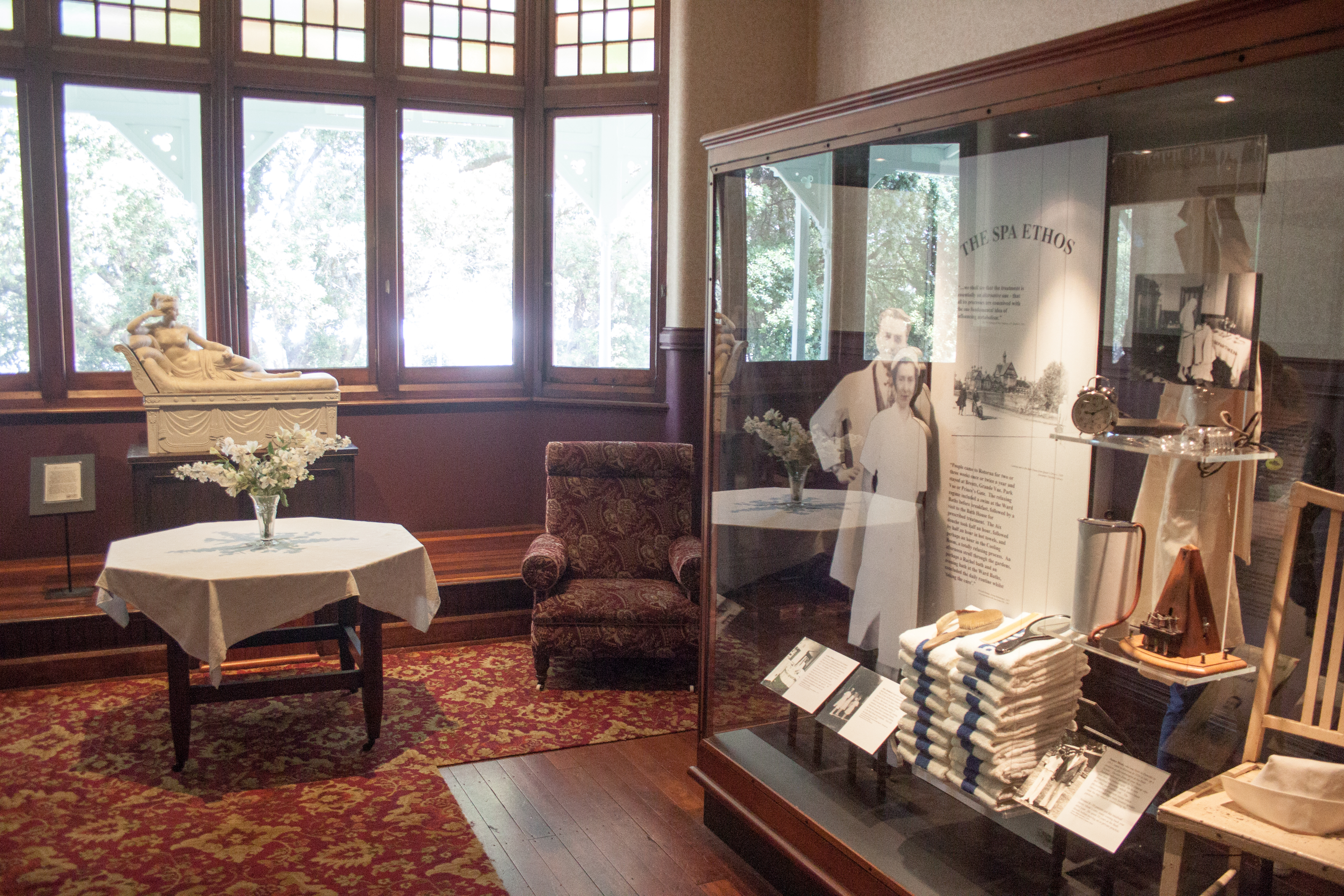

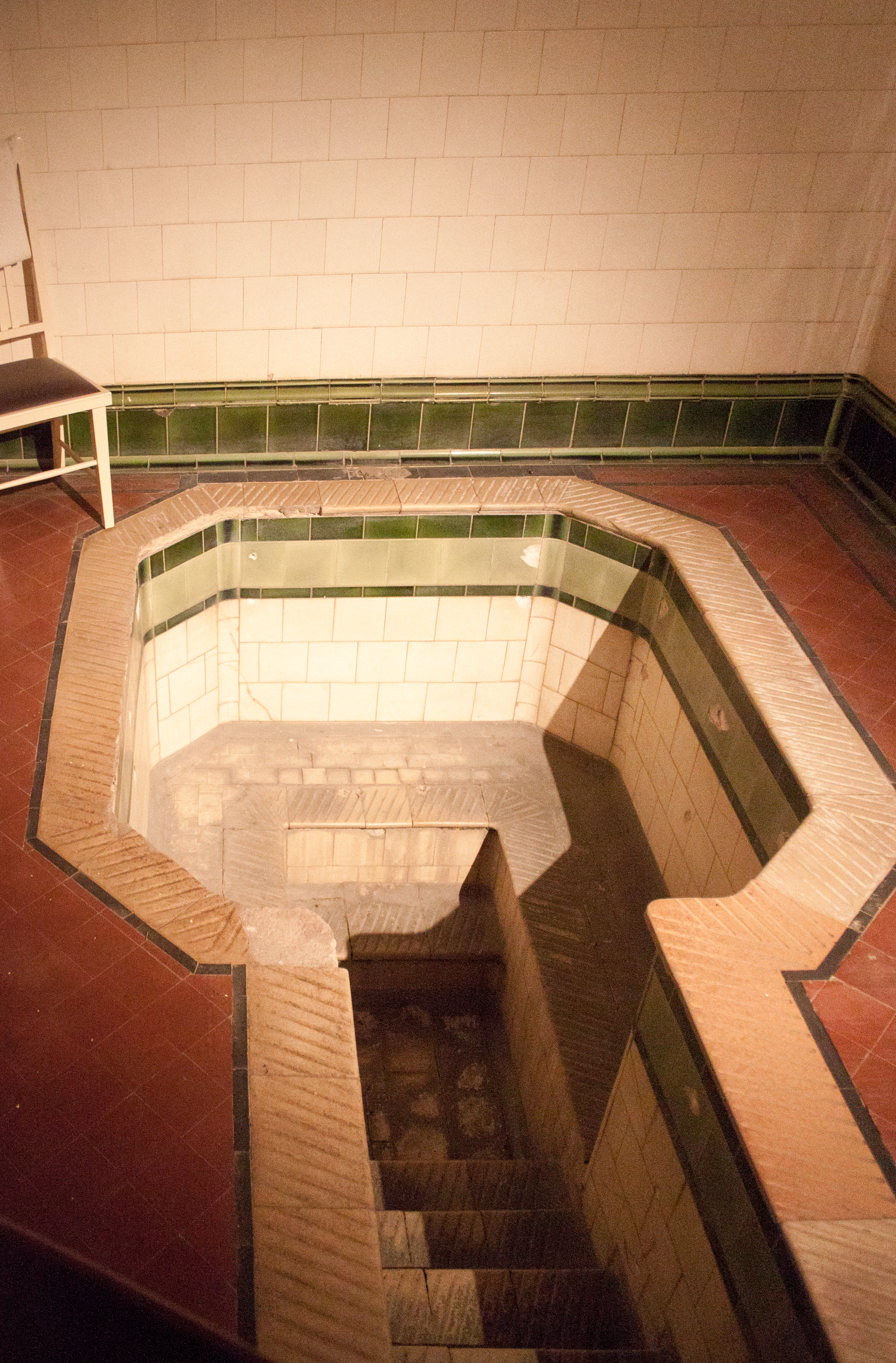

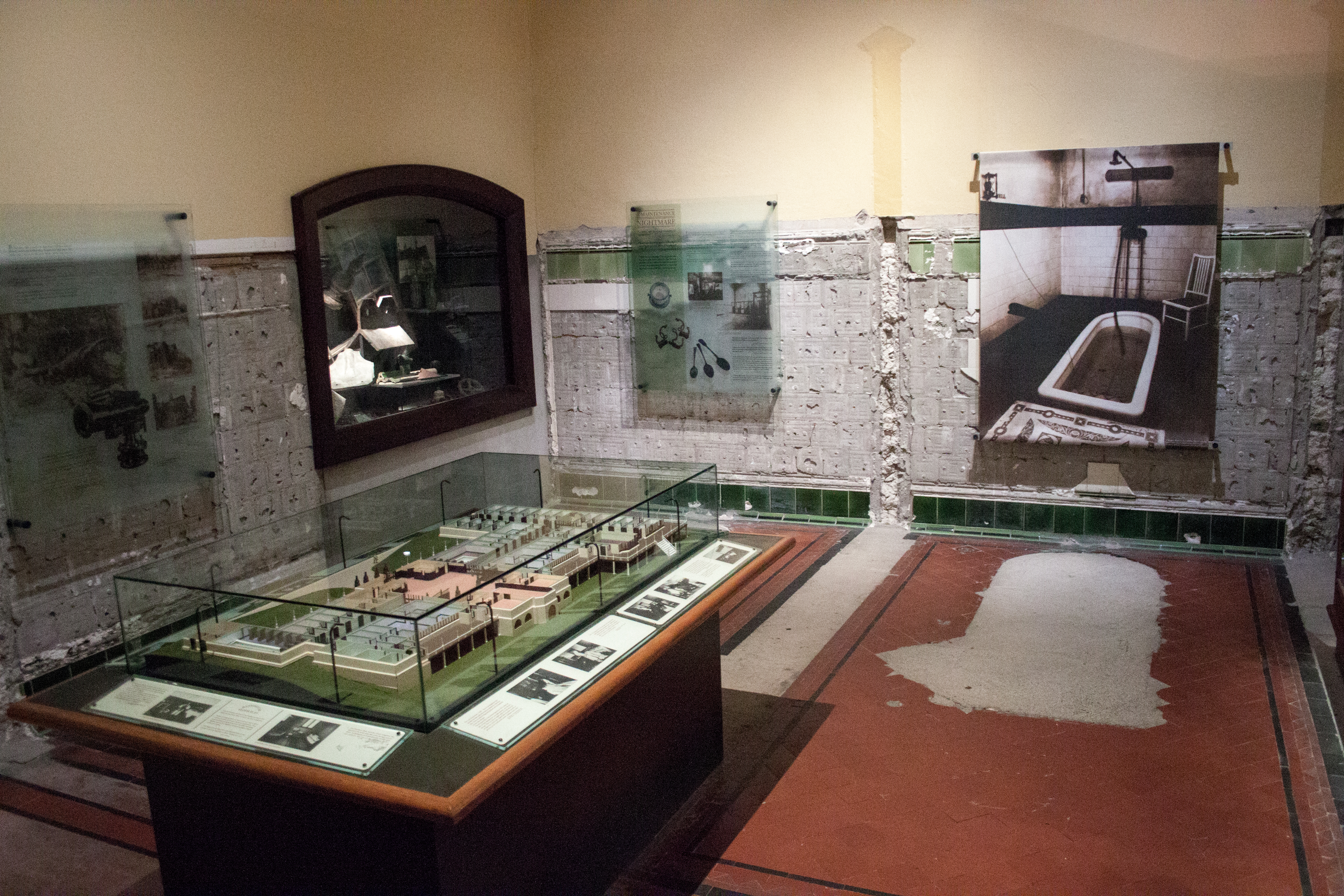

== Current day ==
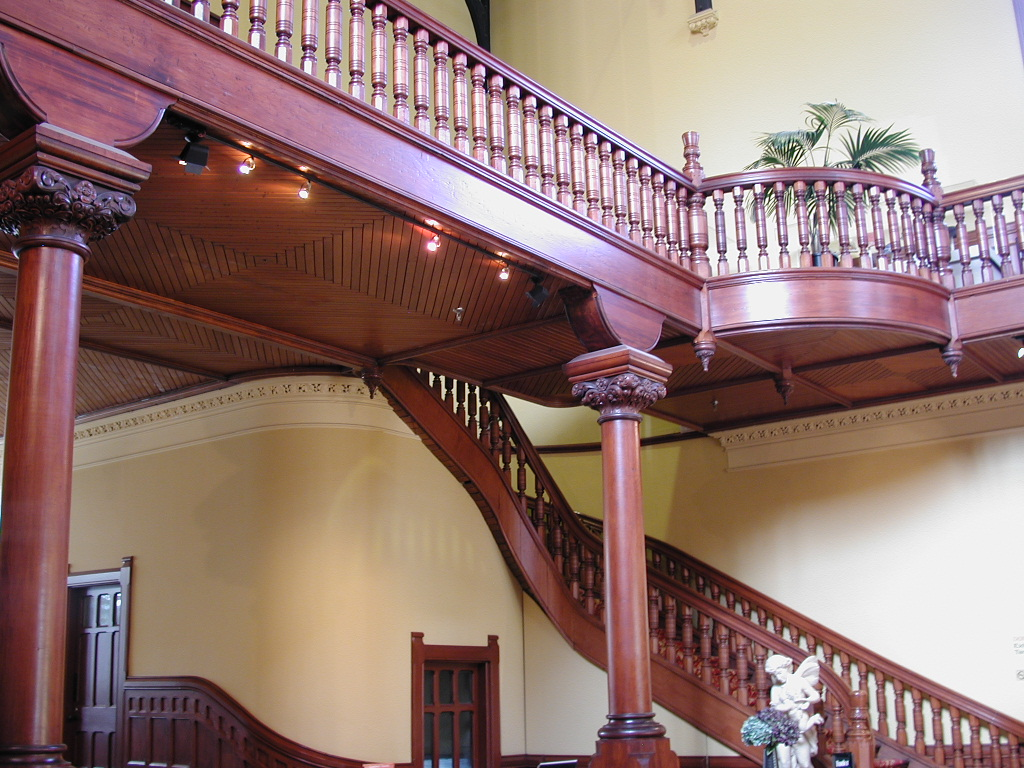
Foyer of Rotorua Bath House prior to closure

The Rotorua District Council runs the Rotorua Museum, a half-timbered building that has been called 'the most impressive Elizabethan Revival building in New Zealand' and 'the most photographed building in New Zealand'.

The museum was closed in 2016 due to not meeting New Zealand earthquake standards. In 2023, the Rotorua Lakes Council committed to continuing and completing repairs to the building to enable it to reopen. Construction began in June 2024, and works are expected to be complete in 2027.

=== Collections, exhibitions and research ===
The museum's collections include:

- Taonga Māori
- Fine Arts
- Photographic
- Social History
- Natural Environment
- Ethnology

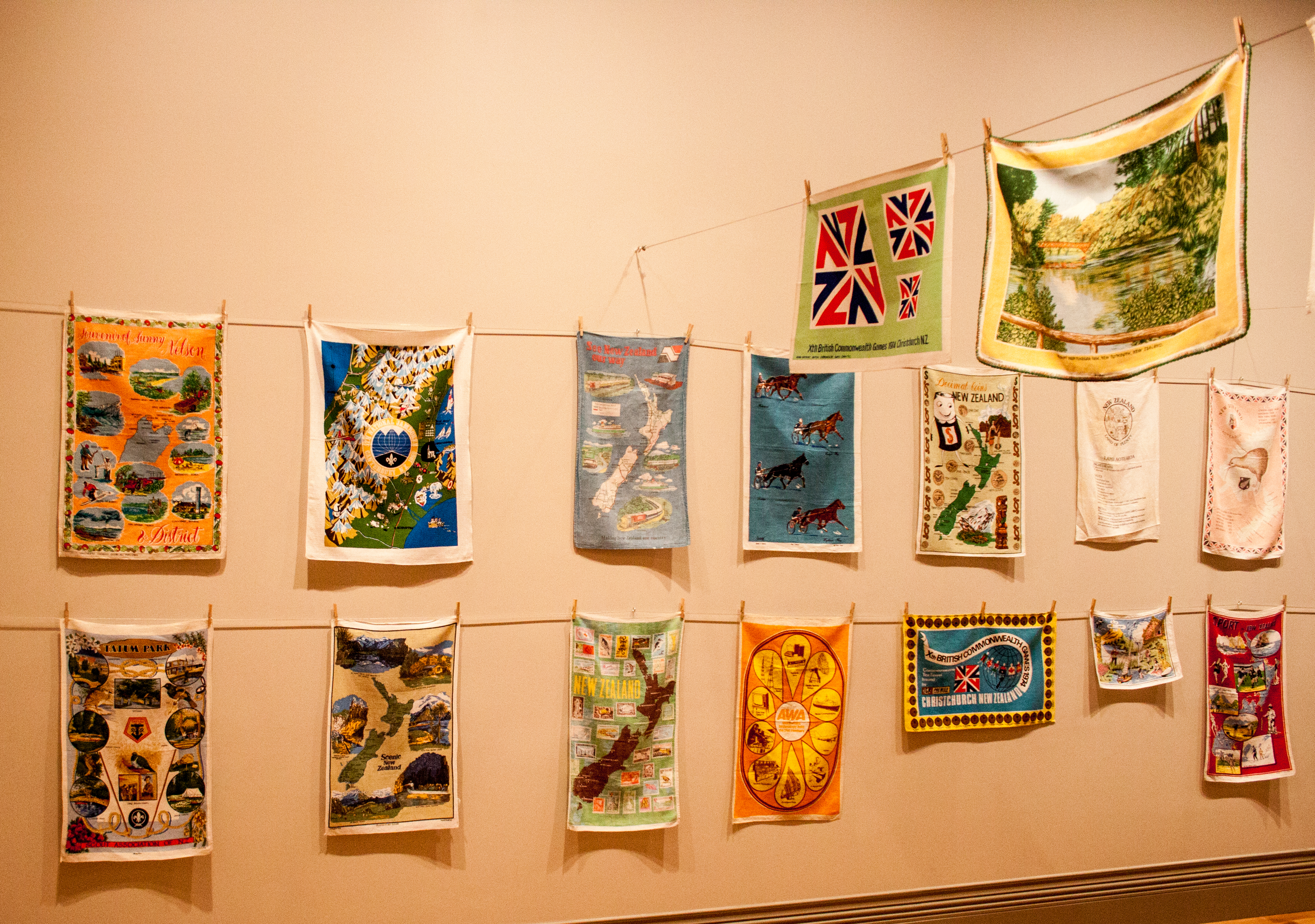
Rotorua Museum tea towel exhibition

As of 2021, the museum collection owned 2490 artworks; approximately 55% were gifted, 45% purchased, and 1% commissioned. There are over 70,000 images depicting Rotorua in the collection. Overall, there is an estimated total of 55,000 items in the collection.

=== Library and archives ===
A large majority of the library collection is dedicated to the history and people of Te Arawa and the Rotorua district. The collection comprises rare books, historic maps and plans, local publications, local business and organisational records, diaries, manuscripts, and documentation related to the history of the Bath House. It also includes files from previous Museum exhibitions and exhibition catalogues.

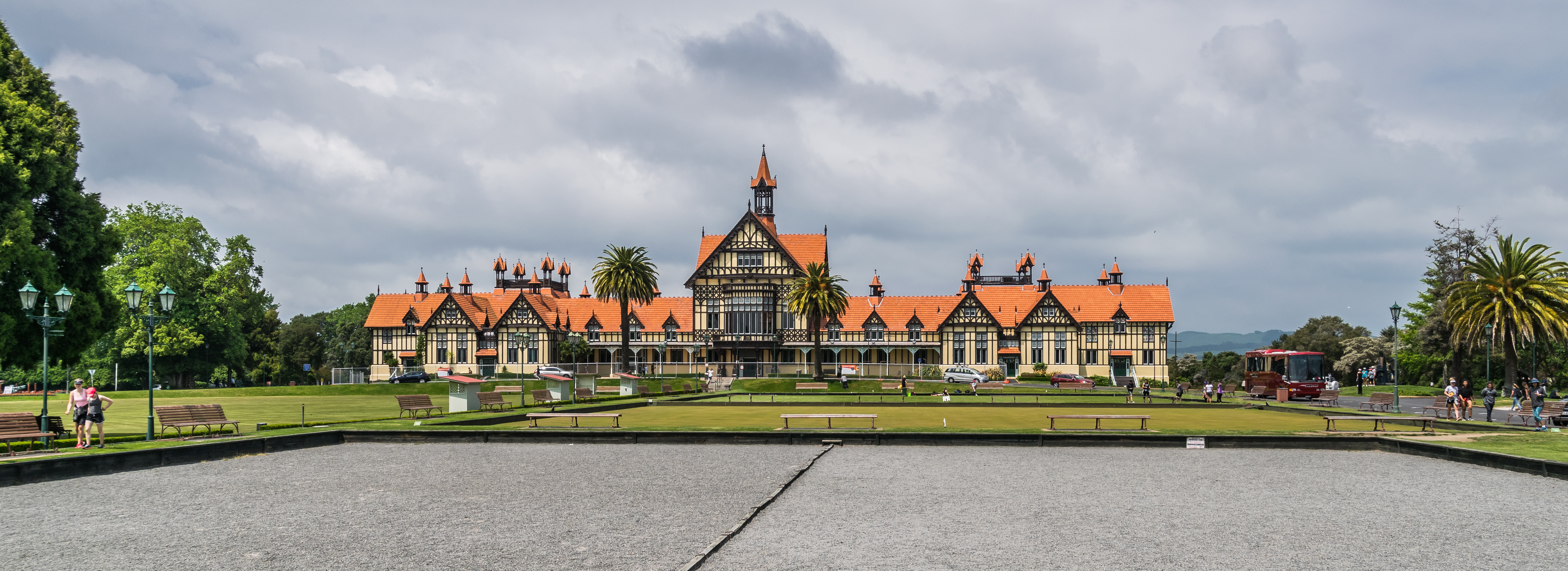
Exterior, 2017

== Gallery ==
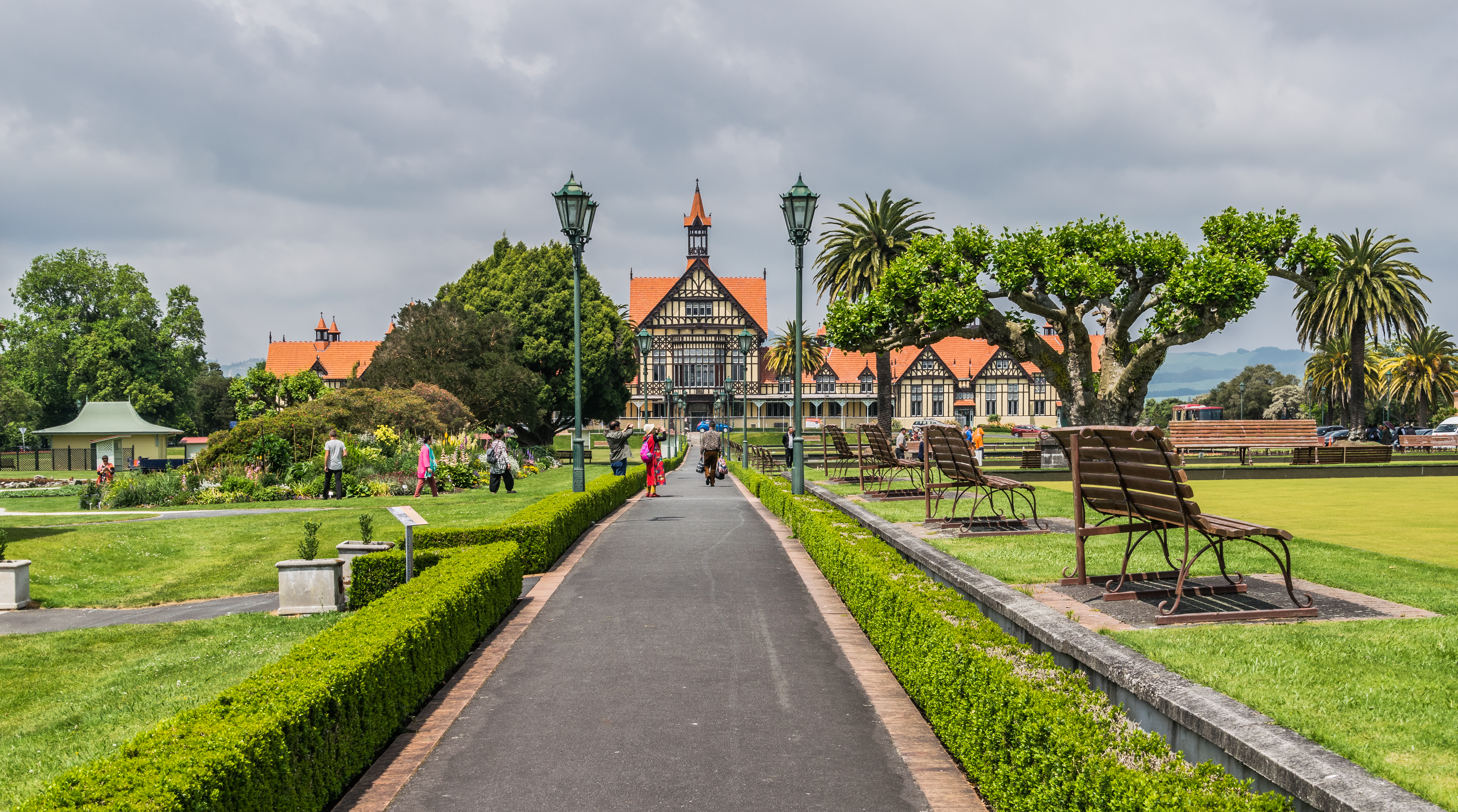

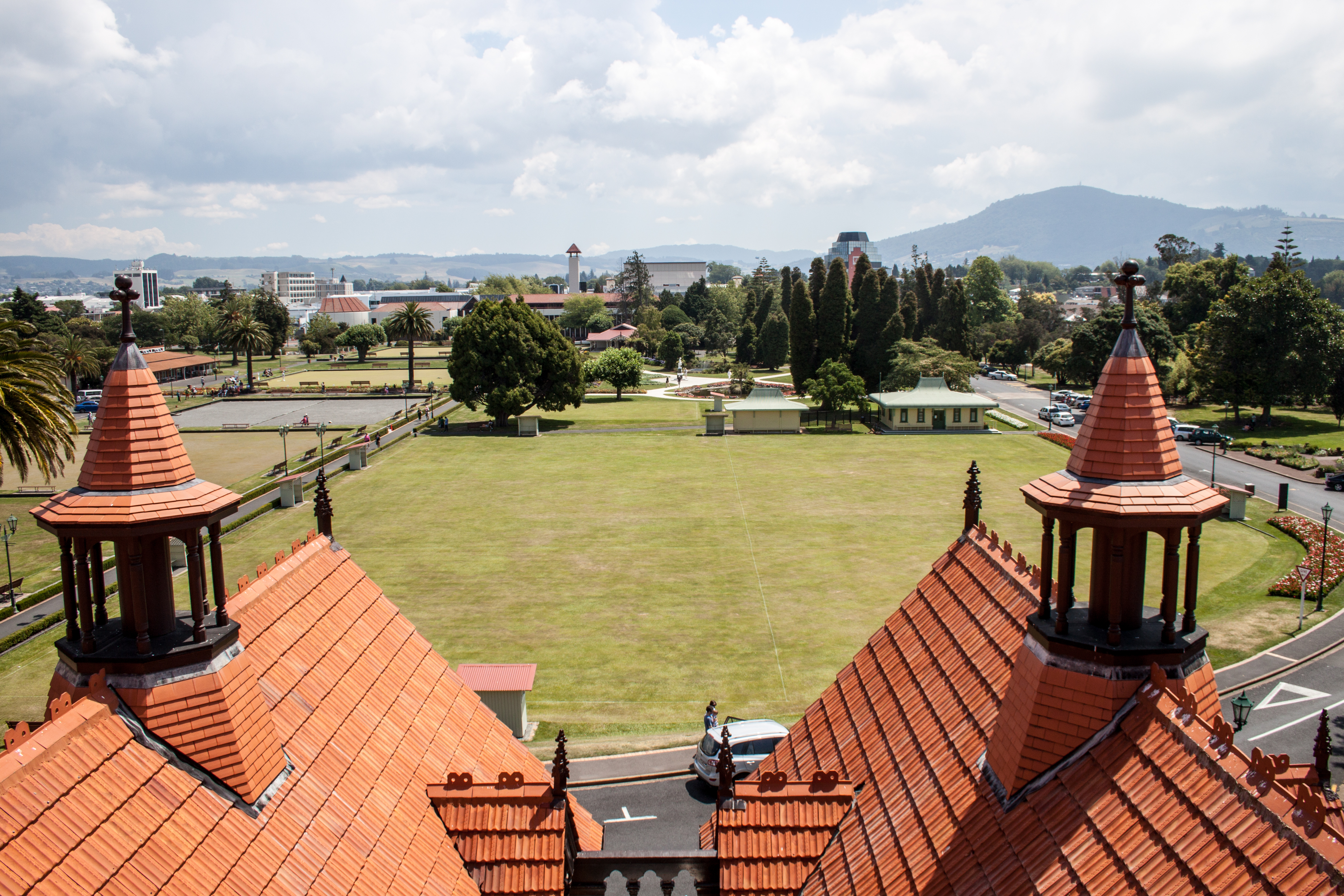

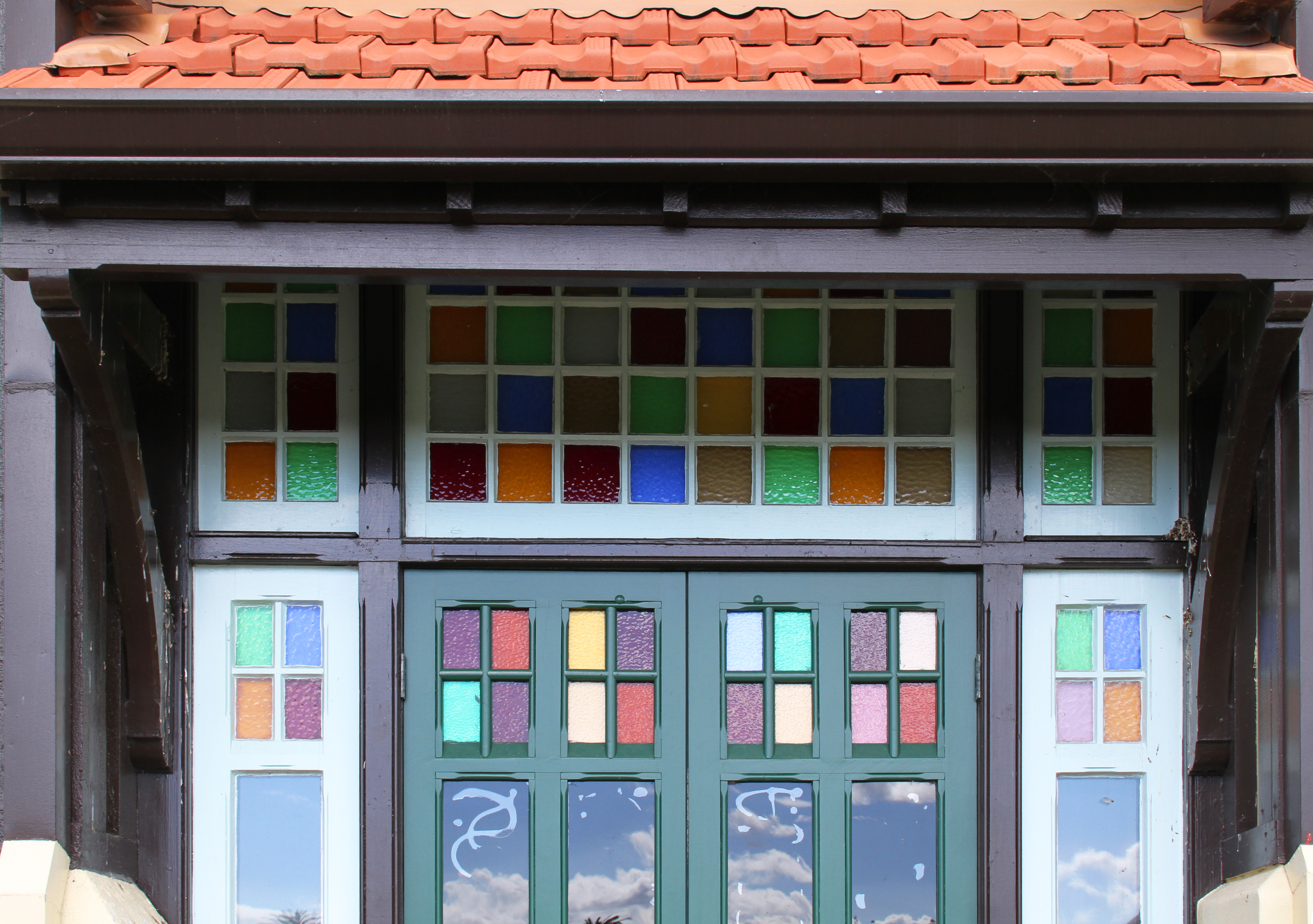

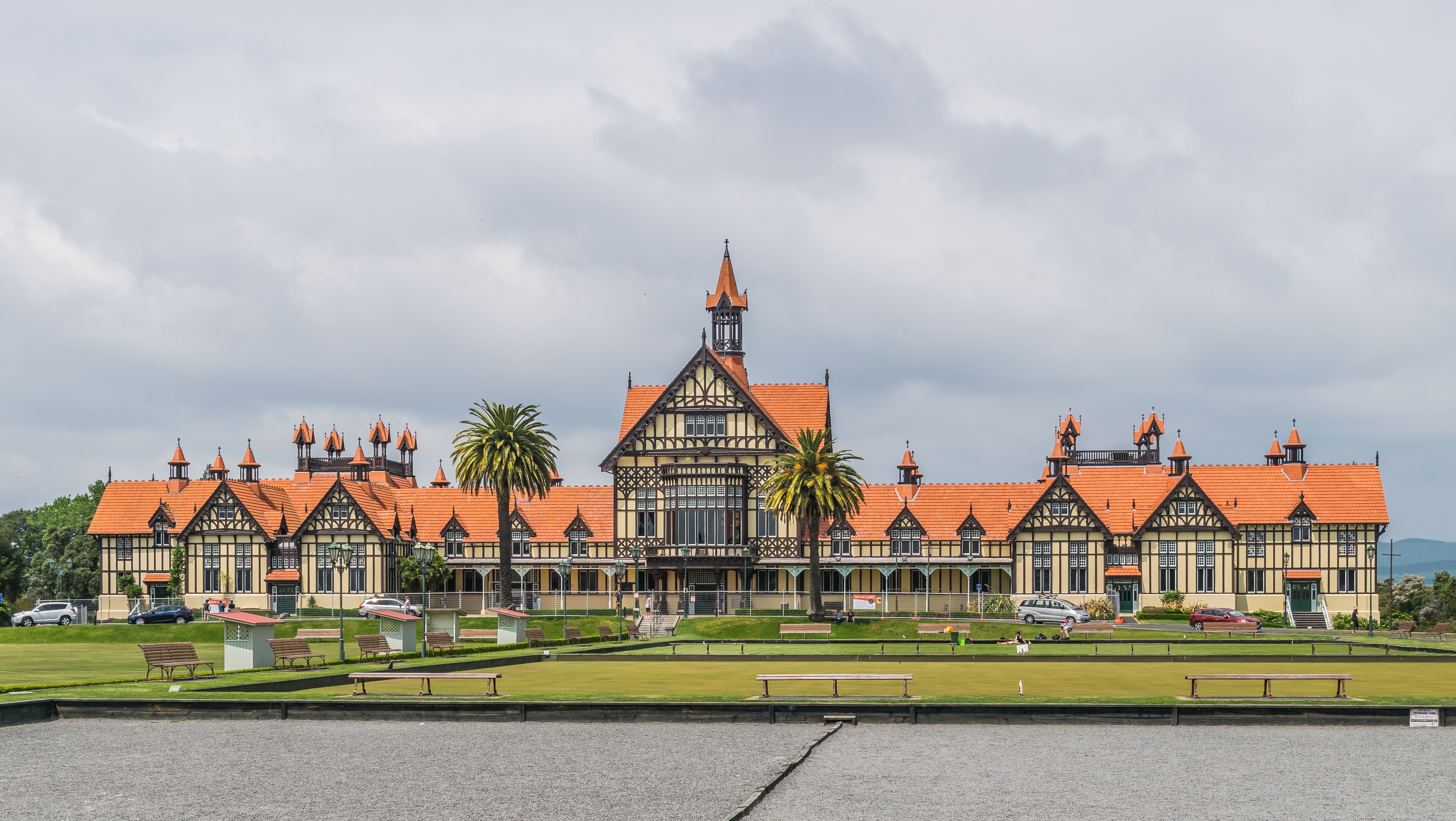
