= Polynesian Spa =

Geothermal spa in Rotorua, New Zealand

Coordinates: 38°8′16.4″S 176°15′29.05″E

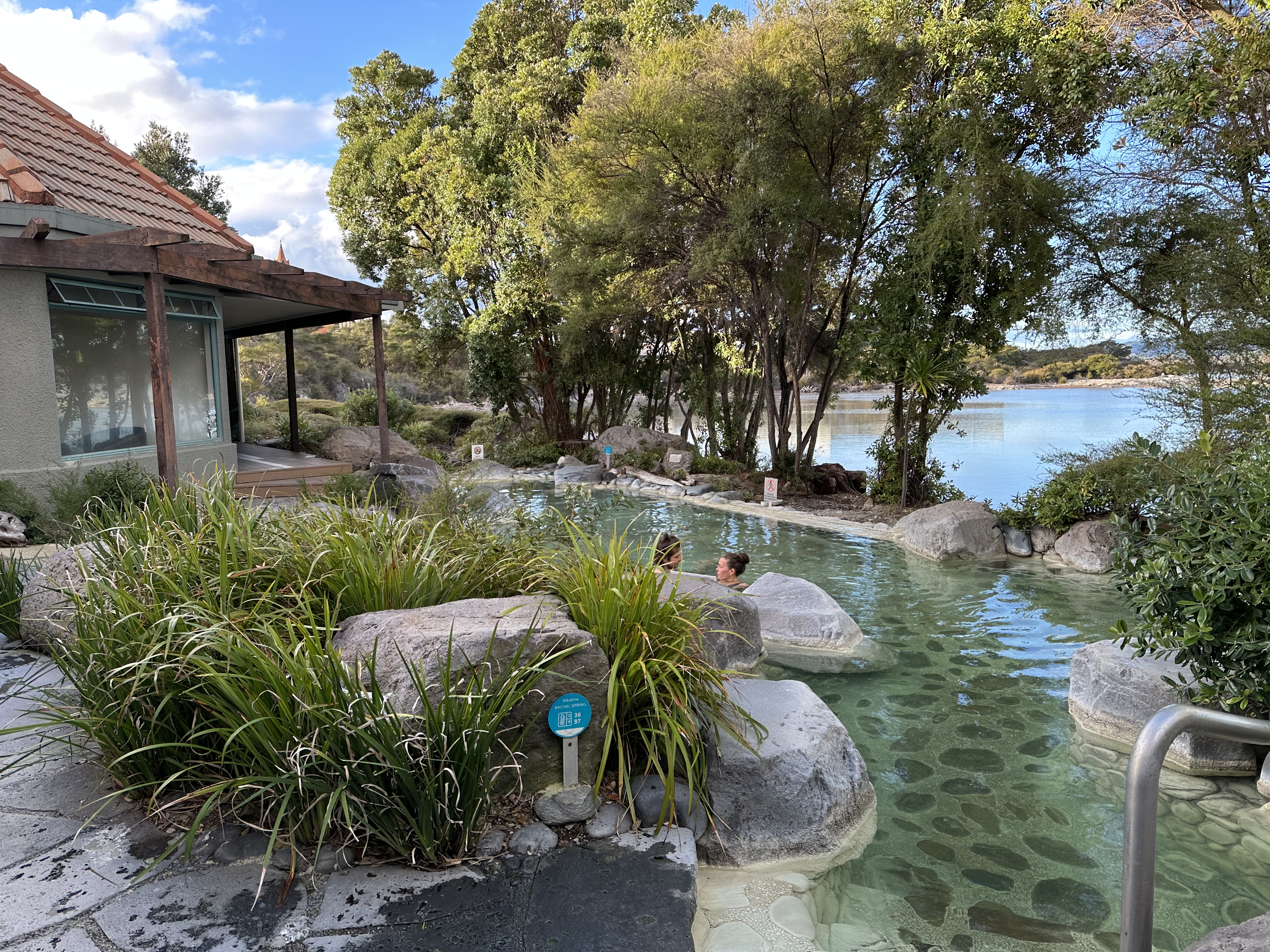
Pools at the Polynesian Spa

Polynesian Spa is a developed geothermal spa facility in Rotorua, North Island, New Zealand.

== History ==
Local Māori acclaimed the therapeutic benefits of the water and bathed for centuries in the acidic pool 'Te Pupunitanga', now called Priest’s Bath. European thermal bathing history at Polynesian Spa began in 1878 when a Catholic Priest named Father Mahoney bathed regularly in the thermal spring water of hand dug pools where Polynesian Spa is now located on the shores of Lake Rotorua. Over several months his arthritis was greatly alleviated, initiating an international reputation for the therapeutic properties of the hot mineral spring water.

The first bath house on site, the Pavilion Bath House opened in 1882, followed by the Ward Baths in 1931. Early bath houses on the site were government-run, the Pavilion Bath, the Duchess Bath, named for the Duchess of Cornwall and York who visited in 1901 and the Ward Baths, named for an early New Zealand Prime Minister, Sir Joseph Ward, who had a passion for thermal waters.

In 1902 Mary MacKillop or Saint Mary of the Cross came to Rotorua to seek treatment in the therapeutic waters of the Duchess Bath. On 16 March Mother Mary MacKillop wrote "I feel the baths are doing me good. The rheumatism in my knees is becoming less and I can walk easily now... This is such a nice private house. We have had a priest resident here most of the time..."

In 1972, the government of the day leased the Ward Baths to Polynesian Pools Limited. and the spa is now known as the Polynesian Spa.

== See also ==
- Government Gardens
