= Te Puni Kōkiri =

New Zealand government department

- Ministry of Māori Development (English)

Ministry overview
- Formed: 1992
- Jurisdiction: New Zealand
- Headquarters: Te Iho (formerly Bowen House), 143 Bowen Street, Wellington WELLINGTON 6011
- Annual budget: Vote Māori Development; Total budget for 2021/2022 ▲$524,731,000
- Minister responsible: Hon Tama Potaka, Minister for Māori Development Minister for Whanau Ora
- Ministry executive: Dion Tuuta, Secretary for Māori Development
- Website: www.tpk.govt.nz

Te Puni Kōkiri (TPK, also called in English the Ministry of Māori Development) is the principal policy advisor of the Government of New Zealand on Māori wellbeing and development. Te Puni Kōkiri was established under the Māori Development Act 1991 with responsibilities to promote Māori achievement in education, training and employment, health, and economic development; and monitor the provision of government services to Māori. The Māori name means "a group moving forward together".

== History ==
=== Protectorate Department (1840–1846) ===
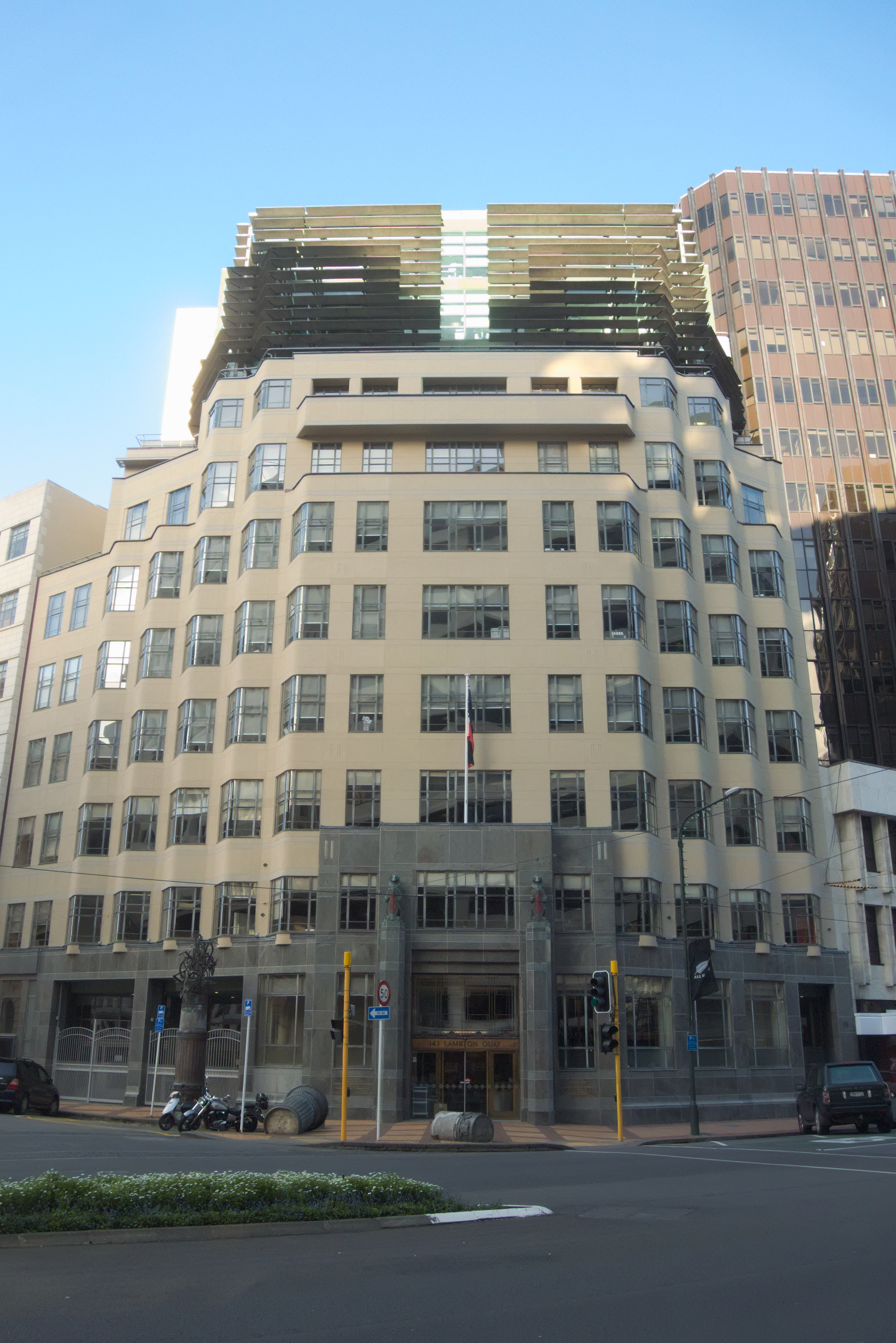
Te Puni Kōkiri House, on Lambton Quay in Wellington

Te Puni Kōkiri traces its origins to the missionary-influenced Protectorate Department, which existed between 1840 and 1846. The department was headed by the missionary and civil servant George Clarke, who held the position of Chief Protector. Its goal was to protect the rights of the Māori people in accordance with the Treaty of Waitangi. The Protectorate was also tasked with advising the Governor on matters relating to Māori and acting as an interpreter for the courts, colonial officials, and the military. Clarke's determination to protect those rights led Governor George Grey to abolish the Protectorate Department in 1846. Grey was opposed to the legal recognition of Māori customs and Māori participation in the judicial system.

=== Native Department (1861–1893) ===
The Protectorate Department was succeeded by the Native Department, which was created in 1861 to manage the growing tensions between Māori and European settlers which eventually culminated in the New Zealand Wars. The Native Department was tasked with delivering services to Māori in the areas of education, healthcare, and policing, and to assimilate Māori into European (or Pākehā) society. Under the purview of the Native Department, Governor Grey established a system of elected Māori committees or Rūnanga and recruited Māori into the civil service. After the abolition of the Rūnanga system, the Native Department conducted its activities through a network of resident magistrates, commissioners, assessors, police and mail carriers. In addition, the native schooling system was established and Māori electorates were created in the New Zealand House of Representatives to ensure Māori representation and participation in the country's governance. In 1893, the Native Department was disbanded and its health, education, and policing functions were reallocated to other government departments.

=== Native/Māori Affairs Department (1906–1989) ===
In 1906, the Native Department was established under the leadership of Native Affairs Minister James Carroll with an initial focus on land management and Māori healthcare. One early priority of the department was developing Māori land in order to boost Māori economic development and to stem the loss of Māori to Europeans. These policies were continued by his successors including Gordon Coates and Āpirana Ngata. Under the First Labour Government, the Native Department's priorities shifted to promoting economic equality and employment for the Māori population. Housing and land development continued and both Māori and Pakeha benefited from the government's welfare state policies. In 1947, the department was renamed the "Department of Maori Affairs" at the initiative of prime minister Peter Fraser, who introduced legislation substituting the word 'Native' to 'Māori' government-wide.

Between 1906 and 1989, the Department of Māori Affairs' portfolio was expanded to include the office of the Māori Trustee; the provision of housing, vocational training, and relocation; the administration of New Zealand's Pacific Island affairs; safeguarding the welfare of Pasifika New Zealanders living in New Zealand, Māori language revival efforts, and the management of the former Mana Enterprises and Māori ACCESS scheme. By the late 1970s, the Māori Affairs Department had under a thousand permanent staff across several regions. Between 1986 and 1987, the department was embroiled in the Māori loan affair, which involved the department attempting to raise overseas funds for Māori development purposes in an unauthorised way.

From 1951 to 1976 the Department published Te Ao Hou / The New World magazine. Its issues are now on the Papers Past website, as are those of its successors, Te Kaea (1979–81) and Tū Tangata (1981–87).

=== Ministry of Māori Affairs (Manatū Māori) and the Iwi Transition Agency (Te Tira Ahu Iwi) (1989 to 1991) ===
In response to the Māori loan affair, the Department of Māori Affairs was dissolved in 1989 and replaced by two new agencies: the Ministry of Māori Affairs (Manatū Māori) and the Iwi Transition Agency (Te Tira Ahu Iwi). The Ministry of Māori Affairs was tasked with advising the government on policies of interest to Māori and monitoring the responsiveness of government agencies to issues facing Māori. The Iwi Transition Agency was tasked with helping Māori iwi (tribes) to develop new capacities to expand their role in society.

=== Te Puni Kōkiri (1992 to the present) ===
Following the Ka Awatea report published by the Fourth National Government's Māori Affairs Minister Winston Peters, the two agencies were replaced in 1992 by Te Puni Kōkiri (Ministry of Māori Development).

Under the terms of the Ka Awatea report, Te Puni Kōkiri was to focus on policy advice and monitoring roles, supported by a network of regional offices. The Ministry was tasked with advising and monitoring mainstream government departments on the provision of services to the Māori community. After 1992, the Ministry's focus shifted from welfare provision towards stimulating economic growth, paid employment, and education as a means of eliminating poverty.

In August 2014, it was announced that TPK would be undergoing a restructure effective by 3 November 2014, with approximately 80 staff losing their jobs.

On 1 June 2018, it was announced that Te Puni Kōkiri would be partnering with the Māori service provider He Korowai Trust to provide affordable "rent–to–own" housing for the Māori community. According to the 2013 New Zealand census, only 29% of Māori adults owned their own homes, compared to 50% of the total population. The Labour–led coalition government also announced that $15 million had been set aside in the 2018 Budget to provide assistance and resources to Māori housing providers with the aim of combating homelessness and increasing Māori housing ownership.

In mid-August 2024, Minister for Māori Crown Relations Tama Potaka announced that Te Puni Kōkiri would assume Te Arawhiti's (the Office for Māori Crown Relations) monitoring and Treaty settlements compliance functions. This decision was criticised by Te Pāti Māori co-leader Debbie Ngarewa-Packer, the Green Party's Māori Crown Relations spokesperson Steve Abel and the Labour Party's Peeni Henare as a "backward step" in the New Zealand Crown's relationship with Māori.

== Structure and functions ==
Te Puni Kōkiri is the New Zealand Government's principal policy advisor on Māori wellbeing and development. The Ministry's other responsibilities include promoting Māori achievement in health, training and employment, education and economic development; and monitoring the provision of government services to Māori.

Te Puni Kōkiri is managed by the Secretary for Māori Development, Dion Tuuta. The Ministry consists of five groups (or Puni): the Policy Partnerships Puni, the Strategy, Finance & Public Sector Performance Puni, the Regional Partnerships and Operations Puni, Critical Projects and Governance Puni and the Organisational Support Puni. The Ministry operates a national office in the capital Wellington and eighteen offices across six regions in both the North and South Islands. Te Puni Kōkiri currently employs approximately 350 staff.

Three public sector organisations that fall under the purview of the Ministry are Māori Television, Te Māngai Pāho (the Māori Broadcast Funding Agency), Te Tumu Paeroa (which deals with the management of Māori–owned land).

=== Ministers for Māori Development ===
The Ministry serves 2 portfolios and 1 minister.

OFFICEHOLDER	PORTFOLIO(S)	OTHER RESPONSIBILITY(IES)
Hon Tama Potaka	Lead Minister (Te Puni Kōkiri); Minister for Māori Development; Minister for Whanau Ora	

=== Administrative Heads ===
==== Protector of Aborigines ====
- George Clarke (May 1840–March 1846)

==== Native Department ====
- H. Halse (acting Native Secretary) (1861–1863)
- E. Shortland (acting Native Secretary) (1863–1864)
- H Halse (acting Native Secretary) (1864–1865)
- W Rolleston (Under-Secretary) (June 1865–May 1868)
- G.S. Cooper (1868–1871)
- H. Halse (acting) (1871–1873)
- H.T. Clarke (1873–February 1879)
- T.W. Lewis (March 1879–December 1891)
- W.J. Morpeth (acting) (December 1891–December 1892)

==== Native Department/Department of Māori Affairs ====
- Judge Edgar (Under-Secretary) (June 1906– January 1907)
- Judge T.W. Fisher (February 1907–October 1916)
- C.B. Jordan (November 1916–December 1921)
- Robert Noble Jones (January 1922–November 1933)
- P.G. Peace (December 1933–May 1935)
- O.N. Campbell (May 1934–February 1944)
- Judge G.P Shepherd (February 1944–September 1948)
- Tipi Tainui Ropiha (September 1948–October 1957)
- M. Sullivan (October 1957–January 1960)
- Jack Hunn (January 1960–July 1963)
- B.E. Souter (acting) (July 1963–October 1963)
- J.M. McEwen (October 1963–February 1975)
- I.W. Apperly (February 1975– November 1977)
- Kara Puketapu (November 1977–December 1983)
- Tamati Reedy (December 1983–September 1989)

==== Iwi Transition Agency (Te Tira Ahu Iwi) ====
- Wira Gardiner (October 1989–December 1991)

==== Ministry of Maori Affairs (Manatū Māori) ====
- J.H. Clarke (July 1989–December 1991)

==== Te Puni Kōkiri – Ministry of Māori Development ====
- Wira Gardiner (January 1992–October 1995)
- R.H. Love (December 1995–November 2000)
- L. Comer (February 2001–September 2012)
- M. Hippolite (December 2012–July 2019)
- L. Davies (acting) (August 2019–September 2019)
- Dave Samuels (September 2019–July 2026)
- D. Tuuta (July 2026–present)
