= Māori Land Court =

Specialised court in New Zealand

- Te Kooti Whenua Māori
- Established: 30 October 1865
- Location: Office of the Chief Registrar; Level 7, Fujitsu Tower, 141 The Terrace, Wellington Te Waharoa Auckland Information Office; Ground Floor, Building B, 65B Main Highway, Ellerslie, Auckland
- Motto: Mā tātou te whenua e ora, mā te whenua tātou e ora We will care for the land, the land will care for us
- Authorised by: Te Ture Whenua Māori Act 1993
- Type of tribunal: Specialized court of record
- Website: māorilandcourt.govt.nz xn--morilandcourt-wqb.govt.nz (in punycode)

Chief Judge Kaiwhakawā Matua
- Currently: Caren Fox
- Since: August 2023

The Māori Land Court (Māori: Te Kooti Whenua Māori) is a specialist court of record in New Zealand designated to hear matters relating to Māori land. Established in 1865 as the Native Land Court, its purpose was to convert customary landholdings into individual titles recognised under English law, which enabled private Pākehā settlers, and later the Crown, to easily purchase Māori land. Since the late 20th century, the court has focused on resolving disputes and protecting Māori land interests.

The court has no centralised courthouse but has a head office in Wellington and sits in various cities and towns in New Zealand as needed. At present, the court maintains registries in Whangārei, Hamilton, Rotorua, Gisborne, Whanganui, and Christchurch, which also serves Chatham Islands. It also has information offices in Auckland and Tūrangi. The Māori Land Court districts are Taitokerau, Waikato-Maniapoto, Waiariki, Tairāwhiti, Tākitimu, Aotea and Te Waipounamu.

Appeals from the Māori Land Court are heard by the Māori Appellate Court, which consists of a panel of three (or more) judges of the Māori Land Court. The Māori Land Court or the Māori Appellate Court may request an opinion on a matter of law from the High Court of New Zealand; such decisions are binding on the Māori Land Court. Appeals from the Māori Appellate Court, if permitted, lie with the Court of Appeal, and from there to the Supreme Court.

== History ==
The earliest attempts to establish courts in New Zealand for title conversion trace back to the Native Lands Act, 1962. The court was officially established in 1865 as the Native Land Court under the Native Lands Act 1865. The court was established to facilitate the purchase of Māori land by the Crown by converting collectively-owned Māori customary land into Māori freehold land. The Act created the Native Land Court to identify ownership interests in Māori land and to create individual titles (in place of customary communal title) that were recognisable in English law. Under the Native Lands Act 1865 only ten owners could be listed on land titles issued by the court.

As outlined by David Williams, "government policy from 1858 onwards ... sought to introduce a rapid individualisation of ancestral Māori land in order to ensure the availability of most of that land for settlement by Pākehā settlers". A continuation of the native land policies of 1862, the intention outlined in the Preamble of the 1865 Act was "to encourage the extinction of such [native] proprietary customs". One means of fulfilling this intention was to limit to ten the number of owners able to be issued a Certificate of Title. Francis Fenton was the chief judge from 1865 to 1882.

The court caused major ructions within some iwi as the court gave a democratic power to ordinary Māori that previously had been the domain of chiefs only. Judges often heard weeks of oral evidence to prove a claim to the land. Judges were totally independent from the government and their decisions were binding on the government. Judges often made their own rules as points of law arose but the general principle was equity. One of the most dramatic cases was the claim of Ngāti Mutunga for their previous land in North Taranaki in 1870. The entire iwi abandoned the Chatham Islands (which they had invaded in 1835) to come to the court hearing.

The court encouraged Māori to sell land to private buyers. But the Crown remained the biggest purchaser. Most Māori-owned land was sold during the economic recession of the 1890s. 2.7 million acres was sold to the government and 400,000 acres to private individuals. The Native Lands (Validation of Title) Act 1892 was passed by the Liberal government to stop any type of fraudulent deals and to give security of title to purchasers. The Act guaranteed Māori a reasonable price for their land. The government on-sold most of its Māori land, often for a profit. The rationale behind the legislation was to unlock under-used land owned by Māori (and also pastoralists with vast landholdings) and sell it to "thrifty, hardworking industrious and independent hardworking individuals." The Liberals saw this as essential economic development. By 1939, almost 100 years after the Treaty of Waitangi was signed, Māori retained just one percent of the South Island and nine percent of the North Island. Land losses continued as the 20th century progressed, again supported by legislation.

During the 1950s and 1960s there was a major review of Māori land legislation. It was recognised that the previous legislative framework had had a detrimental effect on Māori society and the new legislation attempted to improve the situation by giving the a stronger focus on protecting Māori land from alienation.

In 1954 "Māori" was substituted for "Native" in the court's name. In the 1980s the judiciary played a major role in redefining and elevating the constitutional position of the Treaty of Waitangi. In 1993, the Te Ture Whenua Māori Act expanded the court's jurisdiction to allow it to hear cases on all matters related to Māori land.

In 2012, the Māori Land Court minute books dating between 1862 and 1900, held at the Archives New Zealand National Office in Wellington, were included as an entry on the UNESCO Memory of the World Aotearoa New Zealand Ngā Mahara o te Ao register.

== Māori land status ==
Māori land is a unique status of land in New Zealand. The definition of Māori land is provided by section 129 of Te Ture Whenua Māori Act 1993. The Act recognises Māori land as taonga tuku iho, a treasure to be handed down. The Māori Land Court promotes the retention and use of Māori land; and facilitates the occupation, development and use of that land.

In pre-European times, the system of Māori land ownership was based on rights to occupy and use ancestral land. These rights were not held by individuals, but collectively by all members of a hapū or iwi.

Following the signing of the Treaty of Waitangi in 1840, two methods were used by the Crown to obtain Māori land: Crown acquisition and, after the passage of the New Zealand Settlements Act 1863, raupatu. Conflict relating to the sale of land to settlers led to the enactment of the Native Lands Act 1865.

Māori Freehold Land came into being in one of three ways. Either it was set aside by the Crown from the Māori customary land purchased for the settlement of New Zealand; the ownership of Māori customary land has been investigated by the Māori Land Court and a freehold order has been issued; or the Māori Land Court has determined its status as Māori freehold land.

Māori customary land is held in accordance with tikanga Māori and has not been converted to Māori freehold land by the Māori Land Court. Very few customary land blocks remain. They total less than 700 ha (1,700 acres).

== Current judges ==
Māori Land Court judges are appointed by warrant issued by the Governor-General of New Zealand. As of July 2024 the judges are (in order of seniority):

- Chief Judge Caren Fox
- Deputy Chief Judge Craig Coxhead
- Judge Wilson Isaac
- Judge Carrie Wainwright
- Judge Stephanie Milroy
- Judge Sarah Reeves
- Judge Michael Doogan
- Judge Miharo Armstrong
- Judge Terena Wara
- Judge Damian Stone
- Judge Rachel Mullins
- Judge Aidan Warren
- Judge Te Kani Williams
- Judge Alana Thomas
