= Native Lands Act 1865 =

Act of New Zealand Parliament

New Zealand Parliament
- Long title: An Act to Amend and Consolidate the Laws relating to Lands in the Colony in which the Maori Proprietary Customs still exist and to provide for the ascertainment of the Titles to such Lands and for Regulating the Descent, thereof and for other purposes.
- Citation: Native Lands Act 1865.
- Status: Repealed

The Native Lands Act 1865 was an Act of Parliament in New Zealand that was designed to remove land from Māori ownership for purchase by European settlers as part of settler colonisation. The act established the Native Land Courts, individualised ownership interests in Māori land replacing customary communal ownership and allowed up to 5% of Māori land to be taken for public works without compensation.

== Legislative history ==
The full title of the act is: "An Act to Amend and Consolidate the: Laws relating to Lands in the Colony in which· the Maori Proprietary Customs still exist and to provide for the ascertainment of the Titles to such Lands and for Regulating the Descent, thereof and for other purposes." It replaced the Native Lands Act 1862 and created the Native Land Courts. The 1862 legislation three years earlier was to "identify ownership interests in Māori land and to create individual titles in place of customary communal ownership."

The 1865 act further individualised Māori land title with no more than ten owners, meaning the many others in the hapū or whānau that had ownership and usage rights to the land essentially had those right extinguished. The Native Land Court was also known as Te Kooti Tango Whenua, The Land Taking Court.

In 1865 the justice minister at the time Henry Sewell said the aim of the act was

"the detribalisation of the Māori – to destroy, if it were possible, the principle of communism upon which their social system is based and which stands as a barrier in the way of all attempts to amalgamate the Māori race into our social and political system."

=== Amendments ===
A change to the Native Land Act in 1873 removed the ability for a hapū or iwi to be named as an owner of land.

Other related legislation and amendments were: Native Townships Act 1895, Māori Lands Administration Act 1900, Māori Land Settlement Act 1905, Native Land Settlement Act 1907, Native Land Act 1909, Native Land Amendment and Native Land Claims Adjustment Act 1927, Native Land Amendment, Public Works Act 1928 and Native Land Claims Adjustment Act 1929.

Native Land Courts were renamed Māori Land Court in 1947.

== Impact ==
The Crown (the New Zealand Government and state) in the early 2000s assessed Treaty of Waitangi settlements and established that the Native Lands Act 1865 was far reaching in creating unjust decisions and unjust land purchases by the Native Land Courts experienced by almost every iwi or hapū. Between 1870 and 1892, two million hectares of Māori land was transferred to Pākehā ownership.
