= Statutory holiday =

Statutory holiday may refer to:

- Public holidays in Australia
- Public holidays in Canada
- Public holidays in New Zealand
- Public holidays in the United Kingdom

== See also ==
- Category:Lists of public holidays by country
