= New Zealand Day Act 1973 =

Act of Parliament in New Zealand

New Zealand Parliament
- Long title: An Act to make provision for the observance of the 6th day of February in each year as a public holiday to commemorate the signing of the Treaty of Waitangi
- Passed: 1973
- Royal assent: 19 October 1973
- Commenced: Immediate
- Introduced by: Henry May

Related legislation
- Waitangi Day Act 1960 Waitangi Day Act 1976
- Status: Repealed

The New Zealand Day Act 1973 made 6 February a public holiday in New Zealand. The day had been known for some time as Waitangi Day and commemorated the signing of the Treaty of Waitangi. In 1960 the first Waitangi Day Act was passed by the second Labour Government, enabling any area of the country to substitute a Waitangi Day holiday for its provincial anniversary day. This was done for Northland in 1963 through the Waitangi Day Amendment Act passed by the second National Government.

Labour's Māori Affairs spokesperson, Matiu Rata, had introduced a New Zealand Day Bill in 1971 but this was not passed. Labour won the 1972 general election and subsequently introduced another New Zealand Day Bill, which passed in 1973. The creation of a new public holiday was part of the Third Labour Government's programme of creating a distinct New Zealand identity. Before this act was passed, New Zealand had no real 'national day'. New Zealand Day was intended to create a greater sense of pride and unity amongst New Zealanders.

The decision to call the day New Zealand Day rather than Waitangi Day was made by various people within the government, including Prime Minister Norman Kirk and his Minister of Māori Affairs Matiu Rata. They felt that the name New Zealand Day would emphasise that the day was New Zealand's national day, and that it was for all New Zealanders, not just Māori. It may have also been intended to divert attention away from the Treaty of Waitangi, which had been the subject of Māori protests at Waitangi Day in the years before 1973. Many Māori, including the Māori Women's Welfare League, were unhappy with the change of name. The name was changed back by the Third National Government in 1976, in the Waitangi Day Act 1976, which repealed the New Zealand Day Act.

== Debates ==
- New Zealand Parliamentary Debates vol.373 (1971), pp. 2551–69.
- New Zealand Parliamentary Debates vol.382 (1973), pp. 793–7.
- New Zealand Parliamentary Debates vol.385 (1973), pp. 2886–902.
- New Zealand Parliamentary Debates vol.386 (1973), p. 4326.
