= Treaty of Waitangi =

1840 agreement between the British Crown and Māori leaders in New Zealand

Treaty of Waitangi Te Tiriti o Waitangi
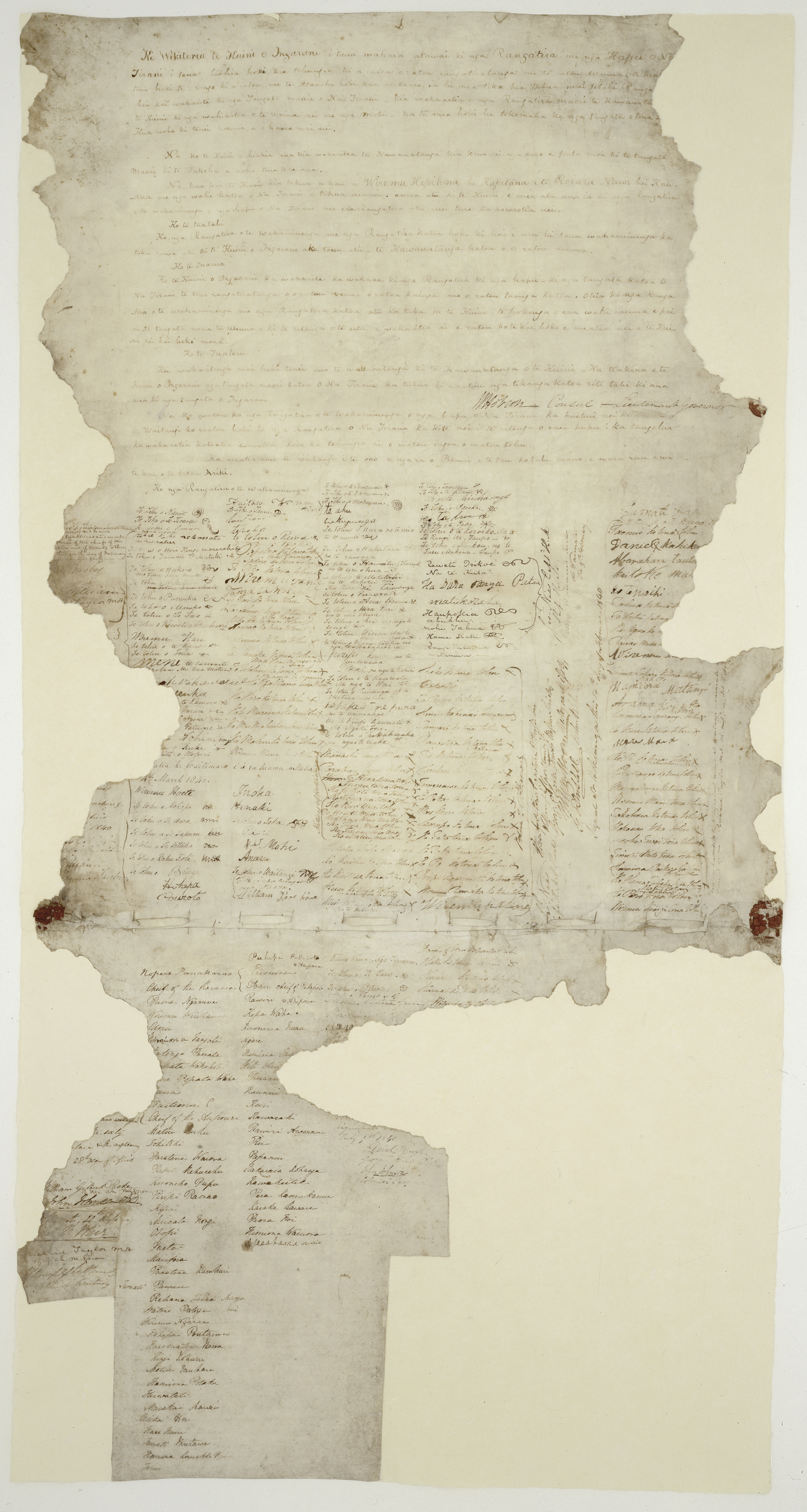
- The Waitangi Sheet of the Treaty of Waitangi
- Context: Treaty to establish a British Governor of New Zealand, to promise to protect Māori tino Rangatiratanga, to proclaim the exclusive Māori ownership of their lands and other properties undisturbed by the Crown, and ensure Māori would also enjoy equal rights of British subjects in British fora.
- Drafted: 4–5 February 1840 by William Hobson with the help of his secretary, James Freeman, and British Resident James Busby
- Signed: 6 February 1840
- Location: Waitangi in the Bay of Islands, and various other locations in New Zealand. Currently held at National Library of New Zealand, Wellington.
- Signatories: Representatives of the British Crown, various Māori chiefs from the northern North Island, and later a further 500 signatories
- Languages: English, Māori

Full text
- Treaty of Waitangi at Wikisource
- www.treatyofwaitangi.govt.nz

The Treaty of Waitangi (Māori: Te Tiriti o Waitangi), sometimes referred to as Te Tiriti (lit. 'The Treaty'), is an 1840 agreement between the British Crown and Māori rangatira which is part of New Zealand's uncodified constitution and its national mythos. The cornerstone legislative recognition of the Treaty in the Treaty of Waitangi Act 1975 represented a paradigm shift and a radically altered official discourse, relating to Māori rights and the relationship between Māori and the Crown. The role of the Treaty in the relationship between Māori and the Crown has become more prominent from the late 20th century. Although the Treaty of Waitangi is not incorporated as a binding international treaty within New Zealand's domestic law, its status as international law is debated. It was first signed on 6 February 1840 by Captain William Hobson as consul for the Crown and by Māori chiefs (rangatira) from the North Island of New Zealand. The treaty's status has clouded the question of whether Māori had ceded sovereignty to the Crown in 1840, and if not, whether such sovereignty remains intact.

The treaty was written at a time when the New Zealand Company, acting on behalf of large numbers of settlers and would-be settlers, was establishing a colony in New Zealand, and when some Māori leaders had petitioned the British for protection against French ambitions. Once it had been written and translated, it was first signed by Northern Māori leaders at Waitangi. Copies were subsequently taken around New Zealand and over the following months many other chiefs signed. Around 530 to 540 Māori, at least 13 of them women, signed the Māori language version of the Treaty of Waitangi, despite some Māori leaders cautioning against it. Only 39 signed the English version. An immediate result of the treaty was that Queen Victoria's government gained the sole right to purchase land. In total there are nine signed copies of the Treaty of Waitangi, including the sheet signed on 6 February 1840 at Waitangi.

== Text and interpretation ==
The Treaty includes a preamble and three articles. There are two texts of the Treaty, one in English and one in the Māori language.

- Article one of the Māori text grants kawanatanga, translated by Hugh Kāwharu as complete governance, to the Crown while the English text cedes "all the rights and powers of sovereignty" to the Crown. A modern translation by Hugh Kāwharu indicates that the Māori chiefs "give absolutely to the Queen of England for ever the complete government over their land".
- Article two of the Māori text uses the word rangatiratanga, translated by Hugh Kawharu as full chieftainship, to describe the chieftainship promised by the Crown to Māori as that exercised at the time by Māori over their lands, villages and all their treasures, and this article also establishes the agreement to sell land at agreed prices to the Queen and her agents. The English text describes the Māori constitutional authority that the Crown guaranteed to protect as the full, exclusive and undisturbed ownership of Māori over their lands and other resources generally, and establishes the exclusive right of pre-emption of the Crown.
- Article three of the Māori text guaranteed Māori the protection of the Queen and the rights and duties of British citizenship. The English text grants Māori people royal protection and the rights and privileges of British subjects.

The two texts differ, particularly in relation to the meaning of having and ceding sovereignty, with Donald Francis McKenzie viewing its interpretation as the contrast between a literate culture and one that was wholly oral. The rangatira may have initially viewed it as an agreement to share power and authority on equal terms; the Crown has always viewed it as the acquisition of Māori consent to cession of sovereignty. These differences created disagreements in the decades following the signing, eventually contributing to the New Zealand Wars of 1845 to 1872 and continuing through to the Treaty of Waitangi settlements starting in the early 1990s. In the period following the New Zealand Wars, the New Zealand government mostly ignored the treaty, and a court judgement in 1877 declared it to be "a simple nullity".

Manuscript copy of the Treaty of Waitangi (in Māori) in the hand of Henry Tacy Kemp

As some words in the English treaty did not translate directly into the written Māori language of the time, the Māori text is not a literal translation of the English text. Paul Moon and Sabine Fenton claimed that Henry Williams, the missionary entrusted with translating the treaty from English, was fluent in Māori and that, far from being a poor translator, he had in fact carefully crafted both versions to make each palatable to both parties without either noticing inherent contradictions.

Furthermore, kāwanatanga is a loan translation from "governorship" and was not part of the Māori language. The term had been used by Henry Williams in his translation of the Declaration of the Independence of New Zealand, which was signed by 35 northern Māori chiefs at Waitangi on 28 October 1835. The Declaration of Independence of New Zealand had stated "Ko te Kīngitanga ko te mana i te w[h]enua" to describe "all sovereign power and authority in the land". There is considerable debate about what would have been a more appropriate term. Scholars such as Ruth Ross argue that mana ('prestige', 'authority') would have more accurately conveyed the transfer of sovereignty. However, it has more recently been argued by others, including Judith Binney, that mana would not have been appropriate as mana is not the same thing as sovereignty, and because no one can give up their mana.

The English-language text recognises Māori rights to "properties", which seems to imply physical and perhaps intellectual property. The Māori text, on the other hand, mentions "taonga", meaning "treasures" or "precious things". In Māori usage the term applies much more broadly than the English concept of legal property, and since the 1980s courts have found that the term can encompass intangible things such as language and culture. Even where physical property such as land is concerned, differing cultural understandings as to what types of land are able to be privately owned have caused problems, such as in the foreshore and seabed controversy of 2003–04.

The pre-emption clause is generally not well translated. While pre-emption was present in the treaty from the very first draft, it was translated to hokonga, a word which simply meant "to buy, sell, or trade". Many Māori apparently believed that they were simply giving the British Queen first offer on land, after which they could sell it to anyone. Another less important difference is that Ingarani, meaning England alone, is used throughout in the Māori text, whereas "the United Kingdom of Great Britain and Ireland" is used in the first paragraph of the English.

Based on these differences, there are many academics who argue that the two versions of the treaty are distinctly different documents, which they refer to as "Te Tiriti o Waitangi" and "The Treaty of Waitangi", and that the Māori text should take precedence because it was the one that was signed at Waitangi and by the most signatories. The Waitangi Tribunal, tasked with deciding issues raised by the differences between the two texts, also gives additional weight to the Māori text in its interpretations of the treaty.

The issue is further complicated by the fact that, at the time, writing was a novel introduction to Māori society. As members of a predominately oral society, Māori present at the signing of the treaty would have placed more value and reliance on what Hobson and the missionaries said, rather than on the written words of the treaty. Although there is still a great deal of scholarly debate surrounding the extent to which literacy had permeated Māori society at the time of the signing, what can be stated with clarity is that of the 600 plus chiefs who signed the written document only 12 signed their names in the Latin alphabet. Many others conveyed their identity by drawing parts of their moko (personal facial tattoo), while still others marked the document with an X.

Māori beliefs and attitudes towards ownership and use of land were different from those prevailing in Britain and Europe. The chiefs would traditionally grant permission for the land to be used for a time for a particular purpose. A northern chief, Nōpera Panakareao, early on summarised his understanding of the treaty as "Ko te atarau o te whenua i riro i a te kuini, ko te tinana o te whenua i waiho ki ngā Māori" ("The shadow of the land will go to the Queen, but the substance of the land will remain with us"). Nōpera later reversed the statement – feeling that the substance of the land had indeed gone to the Queen while only the shadow remained for the Māori.

Beginning in the 1970s with a renewed Māori protest movement, Māori increasingly sought the recognition of the Treaty, sparking nation-wide debate over its meaning and interpretation, particularly in contemporary society.

In 1975 the New Zealand Parliament passed the Treaty of Waitangi Act, establishing the Waitangi Tribunal as a permanent commission of inquiry tasked with determining the meaning and effect of the two texts of the Treaty, investigating breaches of the Principles of the Treaty of Waitangi by the Crown or its agents, and recommending means of redress. The Office of Treaty Settlements was set up in 1988 to negotiate settlements on behalf of the Crown to resolve claims about historical breaches of the Treaty directly with iwi. Settlements with a total value of roughly $1 billion have been awarded. Various legislation passed in the latter part of the 20th century has made reference to the treaty, which has led to ad hoc incorporation of the treaty into law. Increasingly, the treaty is recognised as a founding document in New Zealand's developing unwritten constitution. The New Zealand Day Act 1973 established Waitangi Day as a national holiday to commemorate the signing of the treaty.

== Background ==
Treaty making by European powers with indigenous peoples had always been common in empire building. Treaties were dependent on the specific situation. In 19th century New Zealand, the British wanted to formalise their involvement in the country, protect British interests, regulate land speculation, control violence and disordered settlement. They were faced with a Māori population that was more numerous, with cultivated land and government. Therefore, the British drew up the Treaty of Waitangi. In comparison, this situation did not apply in Australia where no treaties were deemed necessary by the British.

While heading the parliamentary campaign against the British slave trade for twenty years, leading to slave trading being prohibited in the British Empire in 1807, William Wilberforce, with other members of the Clapham Sect, championed the foundation of the Anglican Church Missionary Society (CMS) in 1799, with the determination to improve the treatment of indigenous people by the British. This led to the establishment of the Christian mission in New Zealand, which saw laymen arriving from 1814 to teach building, farming and Christianity to Māori, as well as training Māori ministers.

The Māori language did not then have an indigenous writing system. Missionaries learned to speak Māori, introduced the Latin alphabet and, with Māori, developed the written form of the language between 1817 and 1830. In 1833, while living in the Paihia mission-house of the head of the New Zealand CMS, Rev Henry Williams, missioner William Colenso published Māori translations including parts of books of the Bible, the first books printed in New Zealand. Demand for Colenso's 1837 Māori New Testament, and for the Prayer Book that followed, grew exponentially, as did Christian Māori leadership and public Christian services, with 33,000 Māori soon attending regularly. Literacy and understanding the Bible increased mana and social and economic benefits.

Other major players in the area around the 1830s included American whalers and French Catholics who came for trade and as missionaries. The Māori were deeply distrustful of the French, due to a massacre of 250 people that had occurred in 1772, when the French retaliated for the killing of Marion du Fresne and some of his crew. Māori looked to the British Crown, partially due to their relationships with missionaries and also due to Britain's status as a major maritime power observed by Māori who had travelled, when rumours flew that the French naval vessel La Favourite intended to annex New Zealand. While the threat of general French colonisation never materialised, in 1831, it prompted thirteen major chiefs from the far north of the country to meet at Kerikeri to compose a letter to King William IV asking for Britain to be a "friend and guardian" of New Zealand. It is the first known plea for British intervention written by Māori.

In 1832, the British government sent James Busby to serve as the British Resident in New Zealand, partially in response to calls from merchants, missionaries and individuals citing the Elizabeth affair, but largely in order to protect British trade. Busby's instructions from Governor Richard Bourke were to protect the more orderly British settlers and traders and prevent 'outrages' by the less orderly Europeans against Māori, albeit without naval, military or civil backing. Despite his lack of authority, Busby's immediate intentions were to create a centralised body of chiefs through which he hoped to indirectly govern the tribes.

In 1834, Busby, Henry Williams, William Colenso and Eruera Pare Hongi drafted He Whakaputanga o te Rangatiratanga o Nu Tireni, (a Declaration of the Independence of New Zealand) often shortened to He Whakaputanga. English translation was made at the time of signing. Thirty-four northern Māori rangatira signed the declaration on 28 October 1835, becoming known as the Confederation of United Tribes. The signatures of a further eighteen rangatira were added to He Whakaputanga by 1839, including two non-northern rangatira: Te Wherowhero, the Waikato chief who would later become the first Māori king, and Te Hāpuku of Ngāti Te Whatuiāpiti. Matthew Palmer has said that He Whakaputanga asserted that the 'public authority' of New Zealand remained with Māori; the English text as translated by Busby declares "sovereign power and authority" and the original text refers to kingitanga and mana, which has been translated by Manuka Henare as referring to sovereignty or kinship. Although one official called it "silly and unauthorised", the Colonial Office acknowledged He Whakaputanga with the assurance that the King would protect Māori as long as it was ‘consistent with a due regard to the just rights of others and to the interests of His Majesty’s subjects’. From a Māori perspective, He Whakaputanga had a twofold significance: first, for the British to establish control of its lawless subjects in New Zealand; and second, to establish internationally the mana and sovereignty of Māori leaders.

From May to July 1836, Royal Navy officer Captain William Hobson, under instruction from Governor of New South Wales Sir Richard Bourke, visited New Zealand to investigate claims of lawlessness in its settlements. Hobson recommended in his report that British sovereignty be established over New Zealand, in small pockets similar to those of the Hudson's Bay Company in Rupert's Land (in present-day Canada). Hobson's report was forwarded to the Colonial Office. From April to May 1838, the House of Lords held a select committee into the "State of the Islands of New Zealand". The New Zealand Association (later the New Zealand Company), missionaries, Joel Samuel Polack, and the Royal Navy made submissions to the committee.

On 15 June 1839, new letters patent were issued in London to expand the territory of New South Wales to include the entire territory of New Zealand, from latitude 34° South to 47° 10' South, and from longitude 166° 5' East to 179° East. Governor of New South Wales George Gipps was appointed Governor over New Zealand. This was the first clear expression of British intent to annex New Zealand.

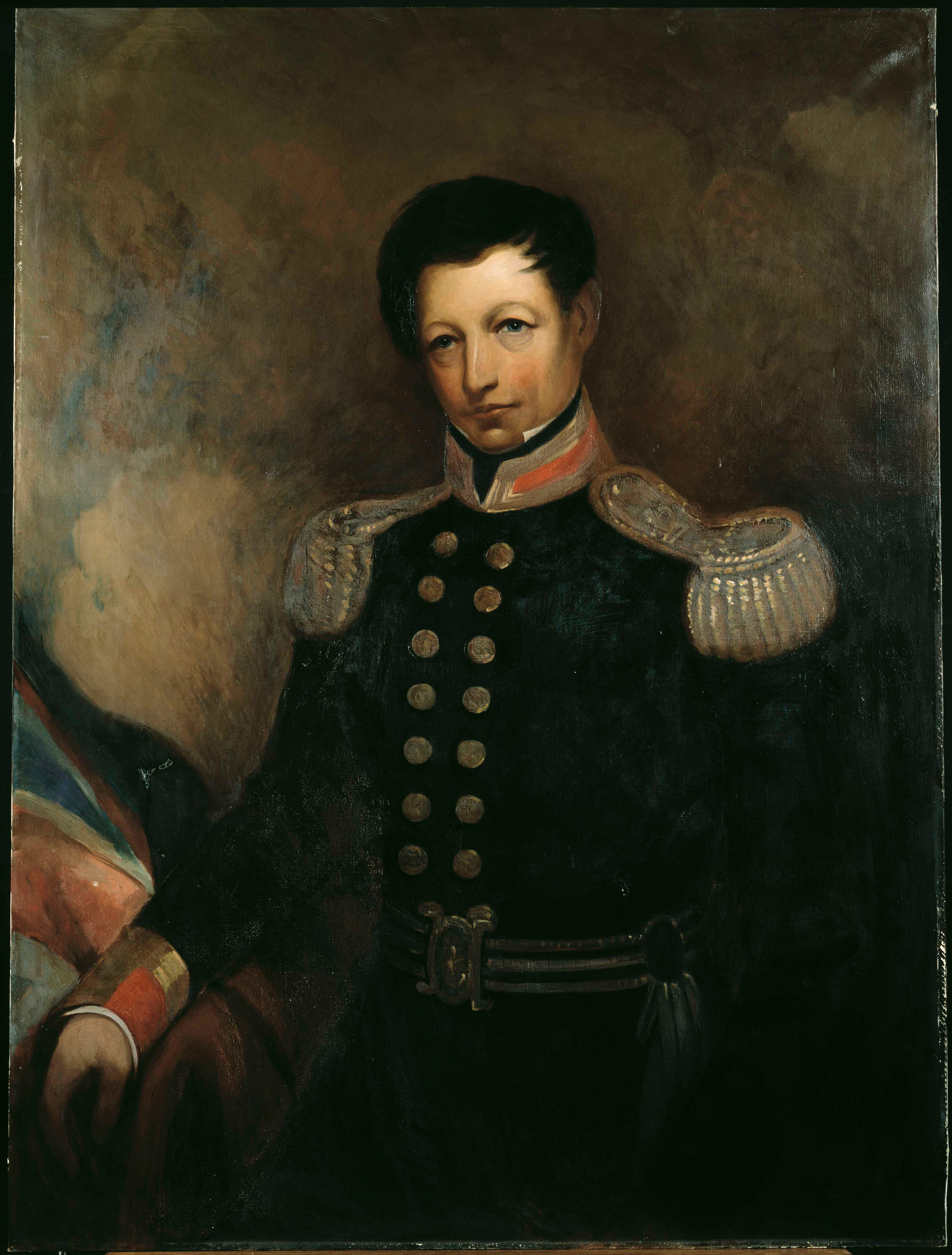
Captain William Hobson

Hobson was called to the Colonial Office on the evening of 14 August 1839 and given instructions to take the constitutional steps needed to establish a British colony. He was appointed Consul to New Zealand and was instructed to negotiate a voluntary transfer of sovereignty from the Māori to the British Crown – as the House of Lords select committee had recommended in 1837. The Secretary of State for War and the Colonies, the Marquess of Normanby, gave Hobson three instructions: to gain freely given Māori recognition of British sovereignty over all or part of New Zealand, to assume complete control over land matters, and to establish a form of civil government. The Colonial Office did not provide a draft of the treaty. Normanby wrote at length about the need for British intervention as essential to protect Māori interests, but this was somewhat deceptive. Hobson's instructions gave no provision for Māori government of any kind nor any Māori involvement in the administrative structure of the prospective new colony. His instructions required him to:

treat with the Aborigines of New Zealand for the recognition of Her Majesty's Sovereign authority over the whole or any part of those islands which they may be willing to place under Her Majesty's dominion.

The historian Claudia Orange argues that prior to 1839 the Colonial Office had initially planned a "Māori New Zealand" in which European settlers would be accommodated (without a full colony), where Māori might retain ownership and authority over much of the land and cede some land to European settlers as part of a colony governed by the Crown. Normanby's instructions in 1839 show that the Colonial Office had shifted their stance toward colonisation and "a settler New Zealand in which a place had to be kept for Māori", primarily due to pressure from increasing numbers of British colonists, and the prospect of a private enterprise in the form of the New Zealand Company colonising New Zealand outside of the British Crown's jurisdiction. The Colonial Office was forced to accelerate its plans because of both the New Zealand Company's hurried dispatch of the Tory to New Zealand on 12 May 1839 to purchase land, and plans by French Captain Jean François L'Anglois to establish a French colony in Akaroa. After examining Colonial Office documents and correspondence (both private and public) of those who developed the policies that led to the development of the treaty, the historian Paul Moon similarly argues that the treaty was not envisioned with deliberate intent to assert sovereignty over Māori, but that the Crown originally only intended to apply rule over British subjects living in the fledgling colony, and these rights were later expanded by subsequent governors through perceived necessity.

Hobson left London on 15 August 1839 and was sworn in as Lieutenant-Governor of New Zealand in Sydney on 14 January 1840, finally arriving in the Bay of Islands on 29 January 1840. Meanwhile, a second New Zealand Company ship, the Cuba, had arrived in Port Nicholson on 3 January 1840 with a survey party to prepare for settlement there. The Aurora, the first ship carrying immigrants, arrived in Port Nicholson on 22 January 1840.

On 30 January 1840 Hobson attended the Christ Church at Kororareka (Russell), where he publicly read a number of proclamations. The first was the Letters Patent 1839, in relation to the extension of the boundaries of New South Wales to include the islands of New Zealand. The second related to Hobson's own appointment as Lieutenant-Governor of New Zealand. The third concerned land transactions (notably the issue of pre-emption).

CMS printer William Colenso produced a Māori circular for the United Tribes high chiefs, inviting them to meet "Rangatira Hobson" on 5 February 1840 at Busby's Waitangi home.

== Drafting and translating the treaty ==
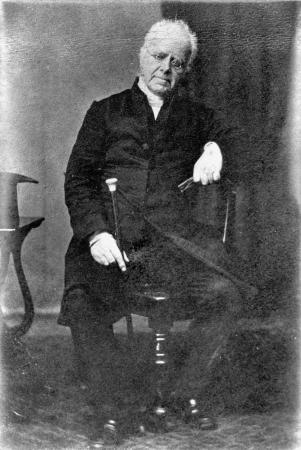
Rev Henry Williams, who translated the treaty into Māori with the help of his son Edward Marsh Williams.

Without a draft document prepared by lawyers or Colonial Office officials, Hobson was forced to write his own treaty with the help of his secretary, James Freeman, and British Resident James Busby, neither of whom were lawyers. Historian Paul Moon believes certain articles of the treaty resemble the Treaty of Utrecht (1713), the British Sherbro Agreement (1825) and the treaty between Britain and Soombia Soosoos (1826).

The entire treaty was prepared in three days, in which it underwent many revisions. There were doubts even during the drafting process that the Māori chiefs would be able to understand the concept of relinquishing "sovereignty".

Assuming that a treaty in English could not be understood, debated or agreed to by Māori, Hobson asked CMS head missioner Henry Williams, and his son Edward Marsh Williams, who was a scholar in Māori language and custom, to translate the document overnight on 4 February. Henry Williams was concerned with the actions of the New Zealand Company in Wellington and felt he had to agree with Hobson's request to ensure the treaty would be as favourable as possible to Māori. Williams avoided using any English words that had no expression in Māori "thereby preserving entire the spirit and tenor" of the treaty. He added a note to the copy Hobson sent to Gibbs stating, "I certify that the above is as literal a translation of the Treaty of Waitangi as the idiom of the language will allow." The gospel-based literacy of Māori meant some of the concepts communicated in the translation were from the Māori Bible, including kawanatanga (governorship) and rangatiratanga (chiefly rule), and the idea of the treaty as a "covenant" was biblical.

The translation of the treaty was reviewed by James Busby, and he proposed the substitution of the word whakaminenga for huihuinga, to describe the "Confederation" or gathering of the chiefs. This no doubt was a reference to the northern confederation of chiefs with whom Hobson preferred to negotiate, who eventually made up the vast majority of signatories to the treaty. Hobson believed that elsewhere in the country the Crown could exercise greater freedom over the rights of "first discoverers", which proved unwise as it led to future difficulties with other tribes in the South Island.

== Debate and signing ==
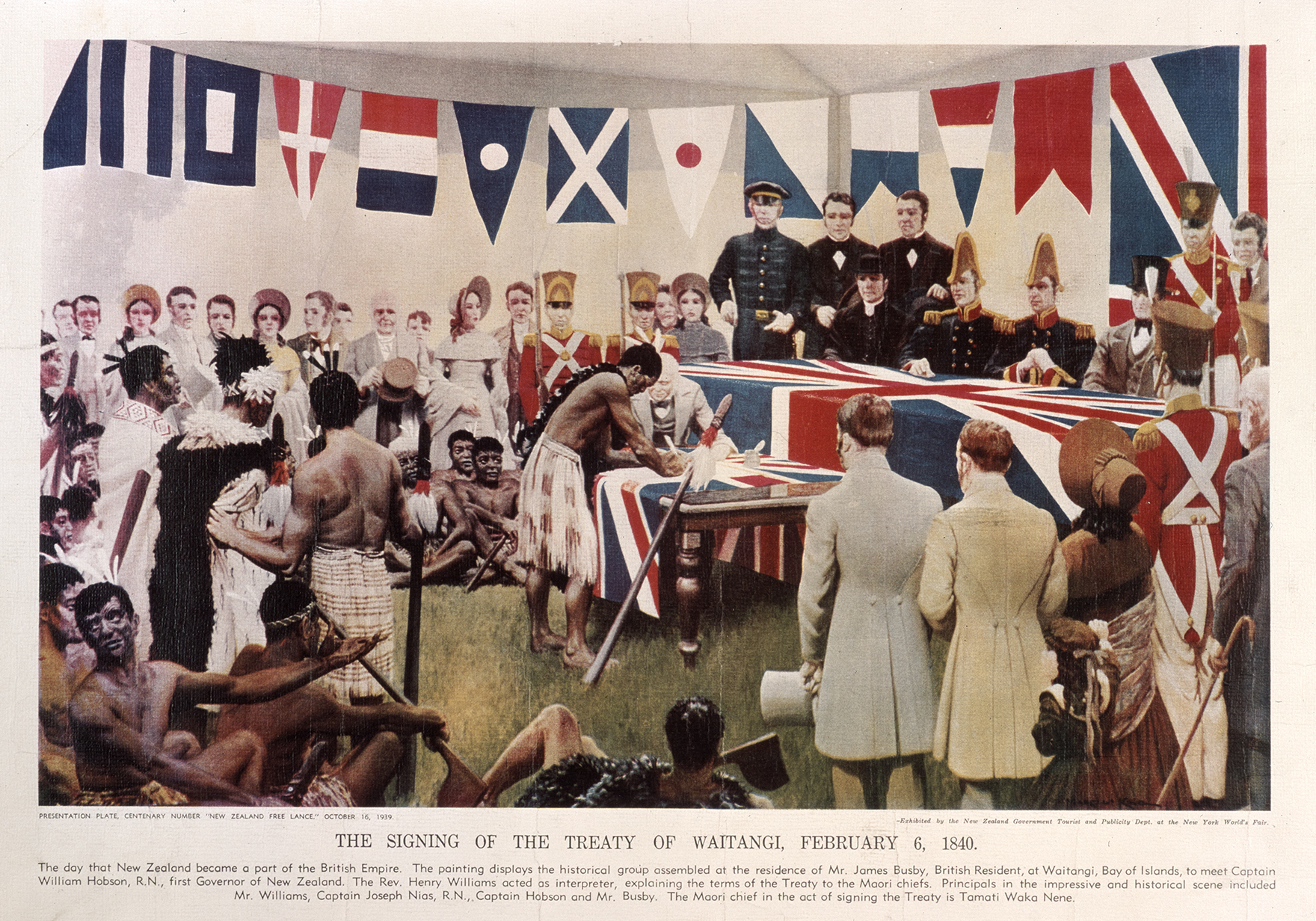
A later reconstruction in a painting by Marcus King, depicting Tāmati Wāka Nene in the act of signing. Hobson is incorrectly shown in full uniform (he was actually wearing civilian clothing).

Overnight on the 4–5 February the original English version of the treaty was translated into Māori. On the morning of 5 February the Māori and English versions of the treaty were put before a gathering (hui) of northern chiefs inside a large marquee on the lawn in front of Busby's house at Waitangi. Hobson read the treaty aloud in English and Williams read the Māori translation and explained each section and warned the chiefs not to rush to decide whether to sign. Building on biblical understanding, he said:

This is Queen Victoria's act of love to you. She wants to ensure you that you keep what is yours – your property, your rights and privileges, and those things you value. Who knows when a foreign power, perhaps the French, might try to take this country? The treaty is really like a fortress to you.

Māori chiefs then debated the treaty for five hours, much of which was recorded and translated by the Paihia missionary station printer, William Colenso. Rewa, a Catholic chief, who had been influenced by the French Catholic Bishop Pompallier, said "The Māori people don't want a governor! We aren't European. It's true that we've sold some of our lands. But this country is still ours! We chiefs govern this land of our ancestors". Moka 'Kainga-mataa' argued that all land unjustly purchased by Europeans should be returned. Whai asked: "Yesterday I was cursed by a white man. Is that the way things are going to be?". Protestant Chiefs such as Hōne Heke, Pumuka, Te Wharerahi, Tāmati Wāka Nene and his brother Eruera Maihi Patuone were accepting of the Governor. Hōne Heke said:

Governor, you should stay with us and be like a father. If you go away then the French or the rum sellers will take us Maori over. How can we know what the future will bring? If you stay, we can be 'all as one' with you and the missionaries.

Tāmati Wāka Nene said to the chiefs:

Some of you tell Hobson to go. But that's not going to solve our difficulties. We have already sold so much land here in the north. We have no way of controlling the Europeans who have settled on it. I'm amazed to hear you telling him to go! Why didn't you tell the traders and grog-sellers to go years ago? There are too many Europeans here now and there are children that unite our races.

Bishop Pompallier, who had been counselling the many Catholic Māori in the north concerning the treaty, urged them to be very wary of the treaty and not to sign anything.

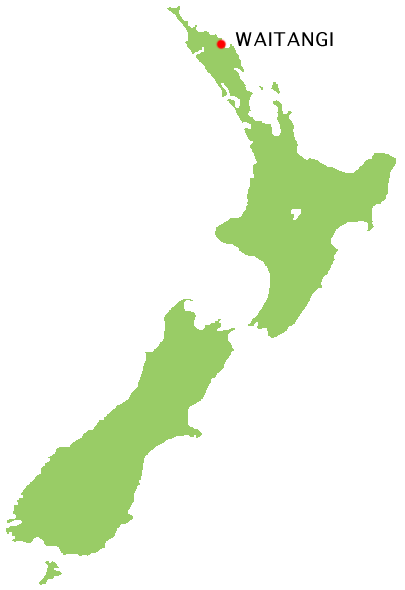
The location of Waitangi within New Zealand

For Māori chiefs, the signing at Waitangi would have needed a great deal of trust. Nonetheless, the expected benefits of British protection must have outweighed their fears. In particular, the French were also interested in New Zealand, and there were fears that if they did not side with the British that the French would put pressure on them in a similar manner to that of other Pacific Islanders farther north in what would become French Polynesia. Most importantly, Māori leaders trusted CMS missionary advice and their explanation of the treaty. The missionaries had explained the treaty as a covenant between Māori and Queen Victoria, the head of state and Church of England. With nearly half the Māori population following Christianity many looked at the treaty as a Biblical covenant – a sacred bond.

Afterwards, the chiefs then moved to a river flat below Busby's house and lawn and continued deliberations late into the night. Busby's house would later become known as the Treaty House and is today New Zealand's most visited historic building.

Hobson had planned for the signing to occur on 7 February however on the morning of 6 February 45 chiefs were waiting ready to sign. Around noon a ship carrying two officers from HMS Herald arrived and were surprised to hear they were waiting for the Governor so a boat was quickly despatched back to let him know. Although the official painting of the signing shows Hobson wearing full naval regalia, he was in fact not expecting the chiefs that day and was wearing his dressing gown or "in plain clothes, except his hat". Several hundred Māori were waiting and only Busby, Williams, Colenso and a few other Europeans.

=== Article Four ===
French Catholic Bishop Jean-Baptiste Pompallier soon joined the gathering and after Anglican English priest and CMS mission head Rev Henry Williams read the Māori translation aloud from a final parchment version. Pompallier spoke to Hobson who then addressed Williams:

The bishop wishes it to be publicly stated to the Natives that his religion will not be interfered with, and that free toleration will be allowed in matters of faith. I should therefore thank you to say to them that the bishop will be protected and supported in his religion – that I shall protect all creeds alike.

Williams attempted to do so vocally, but as this was technically another clause in the treaty, Colenso asked for it to be added in writing, which Williams did, also adding Māori custom. The statement says:

E mea ana te Kawana, ko nga whakapono katoa, o Ingarani, o nga Weteriana, o Roma, me te ritenga Maori hoki, e tiakina ngatahitia e ia. (The Governor says that the several faiths [beliefs] of England, of the Wesleyans, of Rome, and also Māori custom shall alike be protected by him).

This addition is sometimes referred to as article four of the treaty, and is recognised as relating to the right to freedom of religion and belief (wairuatanga). Historian Paul Moon has claimed any guarantee of religious freedom implied by Pompallier's action is a myth and that there is a lack of evidence or legal basis to support the statement being a fourth article of the treaty. Historian Michael King agreed with Moon that Pompallier was probably protecting Catholic interests, but also accused Moon of being anti-Catholic in his criticism of Pompallier stirring up trouble that day.

=== First signings ===
The treaty signing began in the afternoon. Hobson headed the British signatories. Hōne Heke was the first of the Māori chiefs who signed that day. As each chief signed Hobson said "He iwi tahi tātou", meaning "We are [now] one people". This was probably at the request of Williams, knowing the significance, especially to Christian chiefs, 'Māori and British would be linked, as subjects of the Queen and followers of Christ'. Two chiefs, Marupō and Ruhe, protested strongly against the treaty as the signing took place but they eventually signed and after Marupō shook the Governor's hand, seized hold of his hat which was on the table and gestured to put it on. Over 40 chiefs signed the treaty that afternoon, which concluded with a chief leading three thundering cheers, and Colenso distributing gifts of two blankets and tobacco to each signatory.

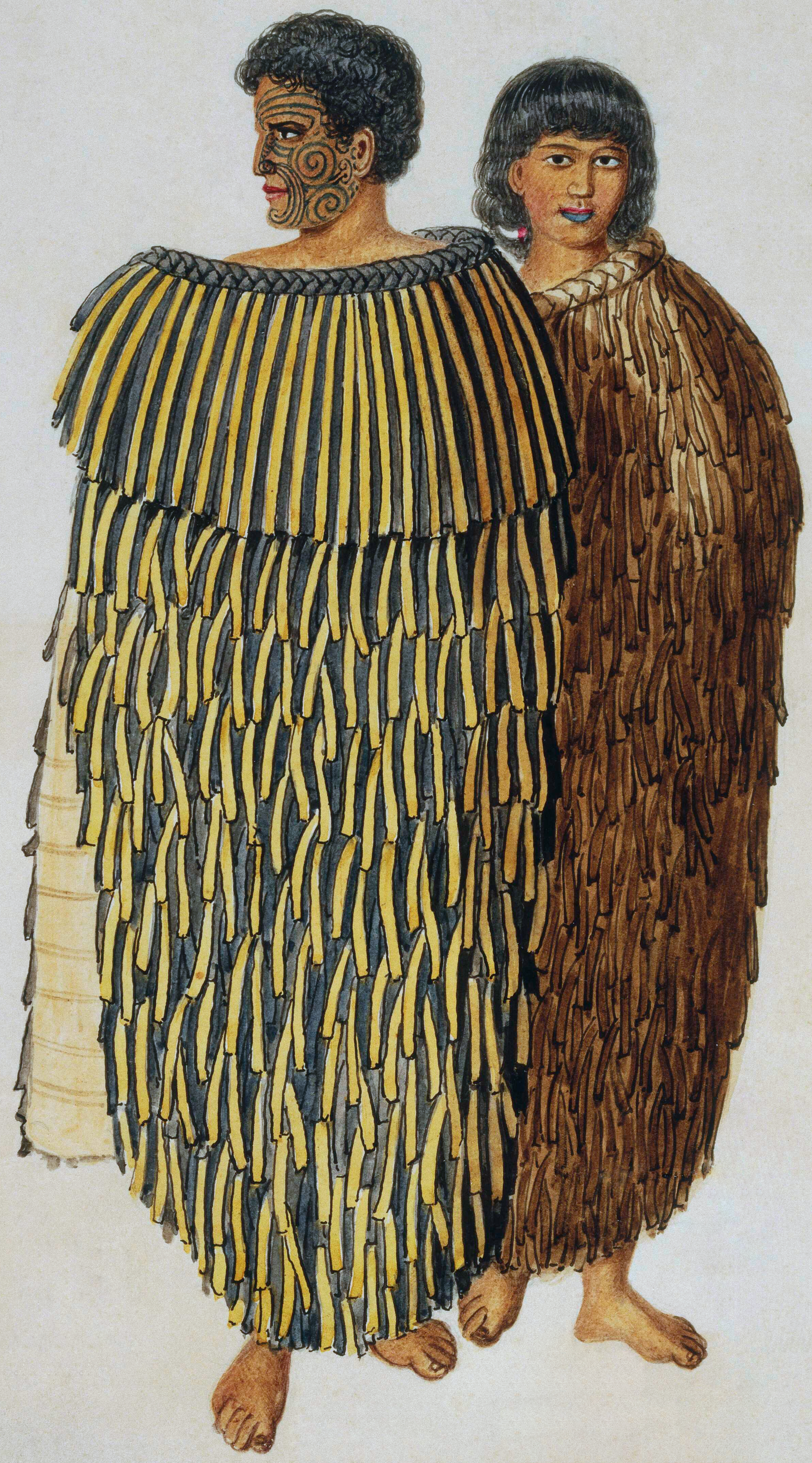
One of the signatories, Hōne Heke of Ngāpuhi iwi, with his wife Hariata.

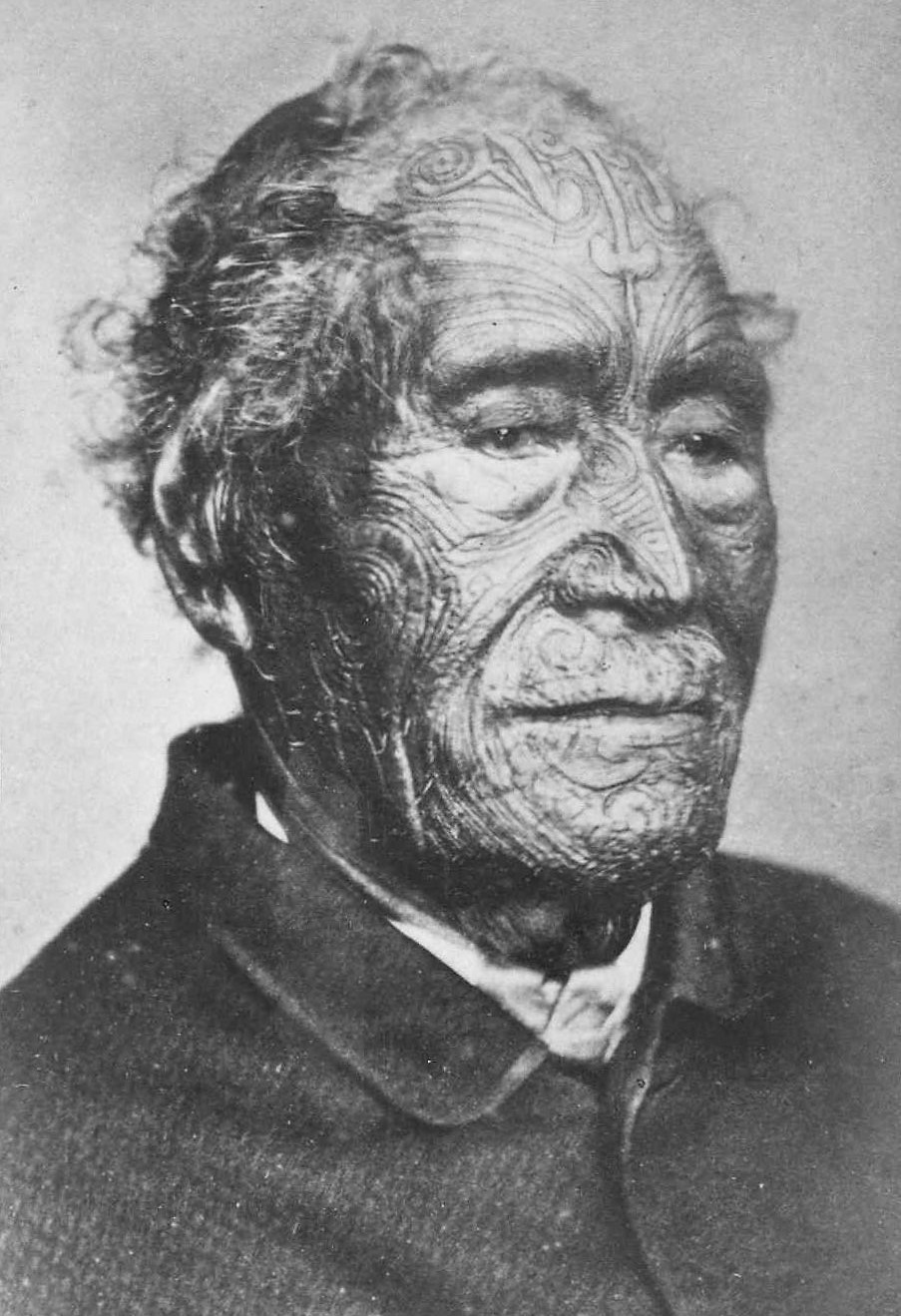
Tāmati Wāka Nene of Ngāpuhi was a signatory, and he also was influential in convincing others to sign.

=== Later signings ===
Hobson considered the signing at Waitangi to be highly significant, he noted that twenty-six of the forty-six "head chiefs" had signed. Hobson had no intention of requiring the unanimous assent of Māori to the treaty, but was willing to accept a majority, as he reported that the signings at Waitangi represented "Clear recognition of the sovereign rights of Her Majesty over the northern parts of this island". Those that signed at Waitangi did not even represent the north as a whole; an analysis of the signatures shows that most were from the Bay of Islands only and that not many of the chiefs of the highest rank had signed on that day. Hobson considered the initial signing at Waitangi to be the "de facto" treaty, while later signings merely "ratified and confirmed it".

To enhance the treaty's authority, eight additional copies were sent around the country to gather additional signatures:

- the Manukau-Kawhia copy (13 signatures),
- the Waikato-Manukau copy (39 signatures),
- the Tauranga copy (21 signatures),
- the Bay of Plenty copy (26 signatures),
- the Herald-Bunbury copy (27 signatures),
- the Henry Williams copy (132 signatures),
- the Tūranga (East Coast) copy (41 signatures), and
- the Printed copy (5 signatures).

The Waitangi original received 240 signatures.

About 50 meetings were held from February to September 1840 to discuss and sign the copies, and a further 500 signatures were added to the treaty. While most did eventually sign, especially in the far north where most Māori lived, a number of chiefs and some tribal groups ultimately refused, including Pōtatau Te Wherowhero (Waikato iwi), Tuhoe, Te Arawa and Ngāti Tuwharetoa and possibly Moka 'Kainga-mataa'. A number of non-signatory Waikato and Central North Island chiefs would later form a kind of confederacy with an elected monarch called the Kīngitanga. (The Kīngitanga Movement would later form a primary anti-government force in the New Zealand Wars.) While copies were moved around the country to give as many tribal leaders as possible the opportunity to sign, some missed out, especially in the South Island, where inclement weather prevented copies from reaching Otago or Stewart Island. Assent to the treaty was large in Kaitaia, as well as the Wellington to Whanganui region, but there were at least some holdouts in every other part of New Zealand.

Māori were the first indigenous race to sign a document giving them British citizenship and promising their protection. Hobson was grateful to Williams and stated a British colony would not have been established in New Zealand without the CMS missionaries.

=== Sovereignty proclamations ===
On 21 May 1840, Lieutenant-Governor Hobson proclaimed sovereignty over the whole country, (the North Island by treaty and the South Island and Stewart Island by discovery) and New Zealand was constituted the Colony of New Zealand, separate from New South Wales by a Royal Charter issued on 16 November 1840, with effect from 3 May 1841.

Hobson issued the proclamation because he felt it was forced on him by settlers from the New Zealand Company at Port Nicholson who had formed an independent settlement government and claimed legality from local chiefs, two days after the proclamation on 23 May 1840, Hobson declared the settlement's government as illegal.

== Extant copies ==
The group of nine documents that make up the Treaty of Waitangi.

In 1841, treaty documents, housed in an iron box, narrowly escaped damage when saved by civil servant George Elliot as the government offices at Official Bay in Auckland were destroyed by fire. They disappeared from sight until 1865 when a Native Department officer worked on them in Wellington at the request of parliament and produced an erroneous list of signatories. The papers were fastened together and then deposited in a safe in the Colonial Secretary's office.

In 1877, the English-language rough draft of the treaty was published along with photolithographic facsimiles, and the originals were returned to storage. In 1908, historian and bibliographer Thomas Hocken, searching for historical documents, found the treaty papers in the basement of the Old Government Buildings in poor condition, damaged at the edges by water and partly eaten by rodents. The papers were restored by the Dominion Museum in 1913 and kept in special boxes from then on. In February 1940, the treaty documents were taken to Waitangi for display in the Treaty House during the Centenary celebrations. It was possibly the first time the treaty document had been on public display since it was signed.

In 1956, the Department of Internal Affairs placed the treaty documents in the care of the Alexander Turnbull Library and they were displayed in 1961. Further preservation steps were taken in 1966, with improvements to the display conditions. From 1977 to 1980, the library extensively restored the documents before the treaty was deposited in the Reserve Bank.

In anticipation of a decision to exhibit the document in 1990 (the sesquicentennial of the signing), full documentation and reproduction photography was carried out. Several years of planning culminated with the opening of the climate-controlled Constitution Room at the National Archives by Mike Moore, Prime Minister of New Zealand, in November 1990. It was announced in 2012 that the nine Treaty of Waitangi sheets would be relocated to the National Library of New Zealand in 2013. In 2017, the He Tohu permanent exhibition at the National Library opened, displaying the treaty documents along with the Declaration of Independence and the 1893 Women's Suffrage Petition.

== Role in New Zealand society ==
=== Right of pre-emption ===
The short-term effect of the treaty was to prevent the sale of Māori land to anyone other than the Crown. This was intended to protect Māori from the kinds of shady land purchases which had alienated indigenous peoples in other parts of the world from their land with minimal compensation. Before the treaty had been finalised the New Zealand Company had made several hasty land deals and shipped settlers from Great Britain to New Zealand, hoping the British would be forced to accept its land claims as a fait accompli, in which it was largely successful.

In part, the treaty was an attempt to establish a system of property rights for land with the Crown controlling and overseeing land sale to prevent abuse. Initially, this worked well with the Governor and his representatives having the sole right to buy and sell land from the Māori. Māori were eager to sell land, and settlers eager to buy.

The Crown was supposed to mediate the process to ensure that the true owners were properly identified (difficult for tribally owned land) and fairly compensated, by the standards of the time. In particular, the Governor had the responsibility to protect Māori interests. Still, Hobson, as Governor of New Zealand, and his successor Robert FitzRoy both took seriously their duty as protectors of Māori from unscrupulous settlers, working actively to prevent shady land deals. Hobson created a group of "Protectors of the Aborigines"; officials specifically appointed to verify owners, land boundaries, and sales. Lack of funds often prevented land deals at this time, which created discontent among those who were willing but unable to sell. Combined with a growing awareness of the profit margins that the government was receiving by reselling the land at a profit, there was growing discontent among Māori with the pre-emption clause. At this time Māori and others argued that the government's abuse of the pre-emption clause was incompatible with article three of the treaty which guaranteed Māori equal rights to those of British subjects. FitzRoy was sympathetic to their pleas and decided to waive the pre-emption clause in 1844, allowing land sales directly to individuals.

=== New Zealand Wars and land sales ===
The growing disagreement over British sovereignty of the country led to several armed conflicts and disputes beginning in the 1840s, including the Flagstaff War, a dispute over the flying of the British Union Flag at the then colonial capital, Kororareka in the Bay of Islands. The Māori King Movement (Kīngitanga) began in the 1850s partly as a means of focusing Māori power in a manner which would allow them to negotiate with the Governor and Queen on equal footing. The chiefs justified the King's role by the treaty's guarantee of rangatiratanga ('chieftainship').

FitzRoy's successor George Grey was appointed Governor in 1845. He viewed the Protectors as an impediment to land acquisition and replaced them with new officials whose goals were not to protect Māori interests, but rather to purchase as much land as possible. Grey restored the Crown's right to pre-emption bypassing the Native Land Purchase Act in 1846, which contemporary writers viewed as a "first step towards a negation of the Treaty of Waitangi". This ordinance also tightened government control of Māori lands, prohibiting Māori from leasing their land and restricting the felling of timber and harvesting of flax. A high court case in 1847 (R v Symonds) upheld the Crown's right to pre-emption and allowed Grey to renegotiate deals made under Fitzroy's waiving of the pre-emption clause. Governor Grey set out to buy large tracts of Māori land in advance of settlement at low prices, later selling it to settlers at higher prices and using the difference to develop land access (roads and bridges). Donald McLean acted as Grey's intermediary and negotiator, and as early as 1840 was aware that Māori had no concept of the sale of land in British sense. Soon Māori became disillusioned and less willing to sell, while the Crown came under increasing pressure from settlers wishing to buy. Consequently, government land agents were involved in a number of dubious land purchases, agreements were sometimes negotiated with only one owner of tribally owned land and in some cases land was purchased from the wrong people altogether. The whole of the South Island was purchased by 1860 in several large deals, and while many of the sales included provisions of 10 per cent of the land set aside for native inhabitants, these land area amounts were not honoured or were later transmuted to much smaller numbers. In some cases Grey or his associates bullied the owners into selling by threatening to drive them out with troops or employ rival chiefs to do so.

Conflict continued to escalate in the early 1860s, when the government used the Māori King Movement as an excuse to invade lands in the eastern parts of the North Island, culminating in the Crown's confiscation of large parts of the Waikato and Taranaki from Māori. The treaty was used to justify the idea that the chiefs of Waikato and Taranaki were rebels against the Crown.

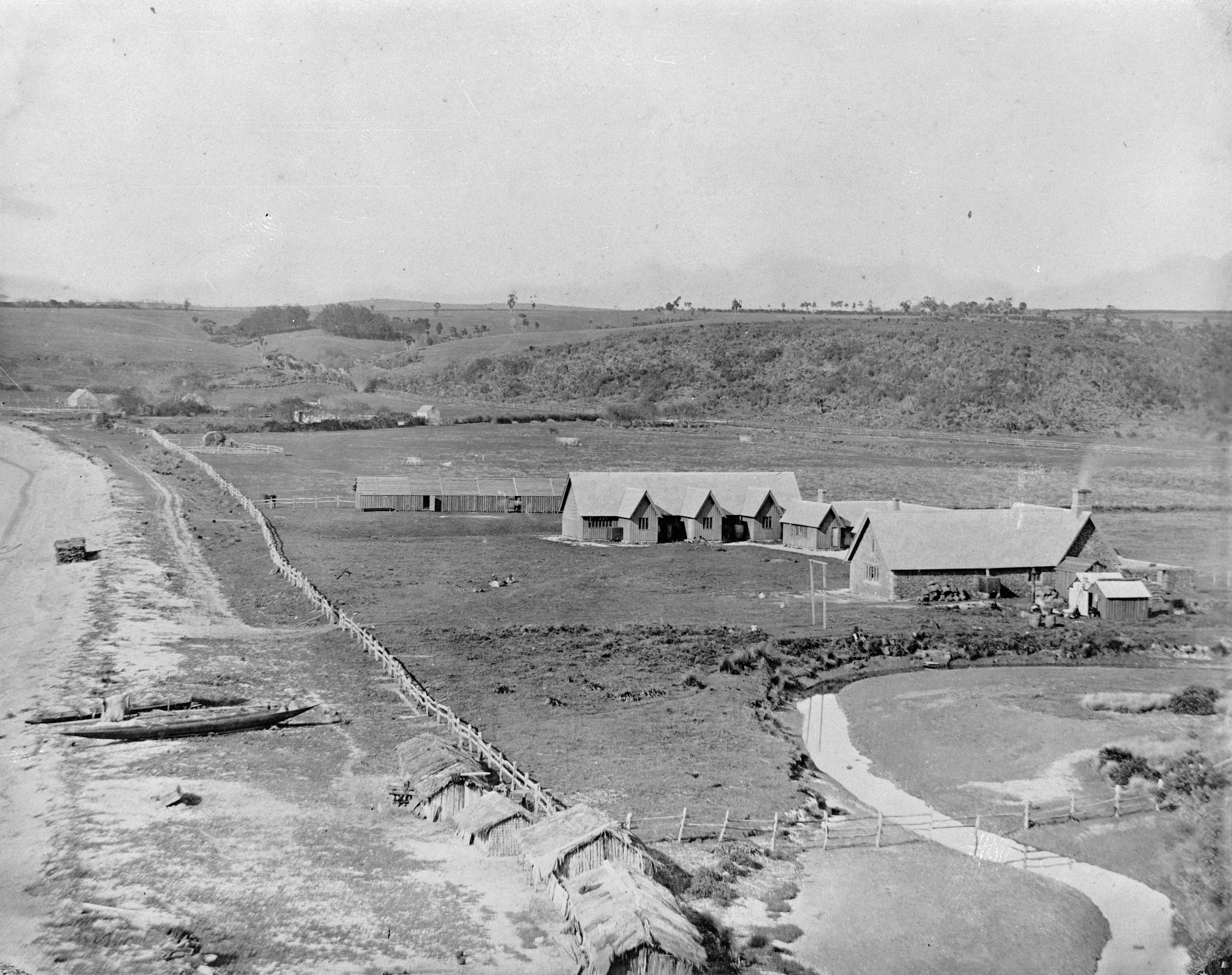
Beach front scene at Kohimarama, Auckland, circa 1860, with Bishop Selwyn's Mission station where the Kohimarama Conference was held. Two waka, and a group of whare, are visible in the foreground.

In July 1860, during the conflicts, Governor Thomas Gore Browne convened a group of some 200 Māori (including over 100 pro-Crown chiefs handpicked by officials) to discuss the treaty and land for a month at Mission Bay, Kohimarama, Auckland. This became known as the Kohimarama Conference, and was an attempt to prevent the spread of fighting to other regions of New Zealand. But many of the chiefs present were critical of the Crown's handling of the Taranaki conflict. Those at the conference reaffirmed the treaty and the Queen's sovereignty and suggested that a native council be established, but this did not occur.

=== Native Land Court ===
The Native Land Court (later renamed the Māori Land Court) was established under the Native Lands Act 1865, which also abolished the Crown right to pre-emption.

Although the treaty has never been directly incorporated into New Zealand law, its provisions were first incorporated into specific legislation as early as the Land Claims Ordinance 1841 and the Native Rights Act 1865. However, in the 1877 Wi Parata v Bishop of Wellington judgement, Chief Justice Prendergast argued that the treaty was a "simple nullity" in terms of transferring sovereignty from Māori to the British Crown. This remained the legal orthodoxy until at least the 1970s. Māori have since argued that Prendergast's decision, as well as laws later based on it were a politically convenient and deliberate ploy to legitimise the seizure of Māori land and other resources.

Despite this, Māori frequently used the treaty to argue for a range of demands, including greater independence and return of confiscated and unfairly purchased land. This was especially the case from the mid-19th century, when they lost numerical superiority and generally lost control of most of the country and had little representation in government or the councils where decisions that impacted their affairs were made. Simultaneously, Māori rights over fisheries (guaranteed in article 2 of the treaty) were similarly degraded by laws passed in the late 19th century.

Over the longer term, the land purchase aspect of the treaty declined in importance, while the clauses of the treaty which deal with sovereignty and Māori rights took on greater importance. In 1938, the Privy Council decided the case Te Heuheu Tukino v Aotea District Maori Land Board and ruled that the treaty was valid in terms of the transfer of sovereignty, but that it was not part of New Zealand law and therefore did not bind the Crown.

=== Treaty House and revival ===
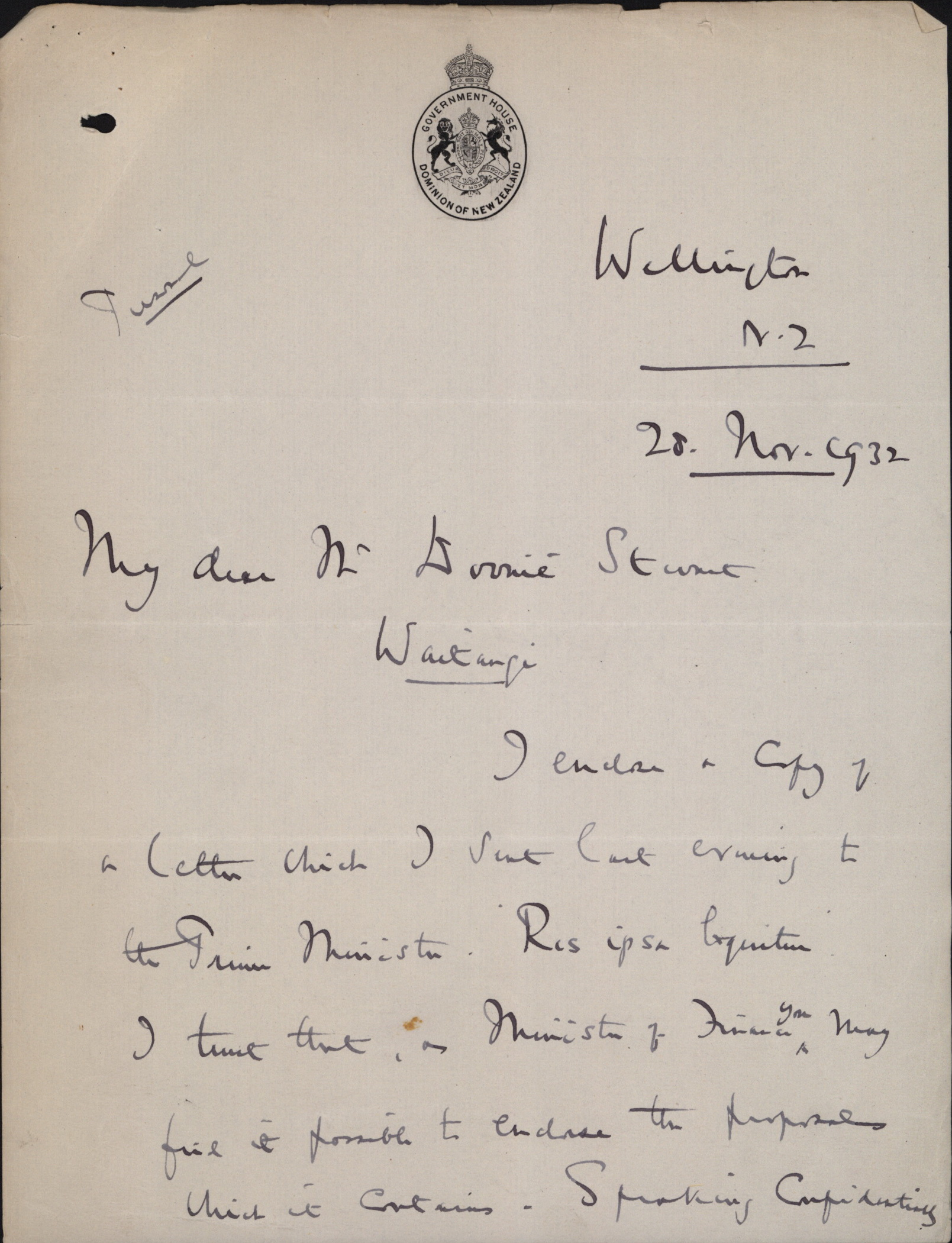
Lord and Lady Bledisloe announce the gift of land and Treaty House at Waitangi to the nation in 1932

The treaty returned to the public eye after the Treaty House and grounds were purchased by the Governor-General, Viscount Bledisloe, in the early 1930s and donated to the nation. The dedication of the site as a national reserve in 1934 was probably the first major event held there since the 1840s. The profile of the treaty was further raised by the New Zealand centenary of 1940. For most of the twentieth century, textbooks, government publicity and many historians touted the treaty as the moral foundation of colonisation and argued that it set race relations in New Zealand above those of colonies in North America, Africa and Australia. Popular histories of New Zealand and the treaty often claimed that the treaty was an example of British benevolence and therefore an honourable contract. Even though Māori continued to challenge this narrative, the treaty's lack of legal standing in 1840 and subsequent breaches tended to be overlooked until the 1970s when these issues were raised by the Māori protest movement.

=== Resurgence and place in New Zealand Law (1960–present) ===
The Waitangi Day Act 1960 was a token gesture towards acknowledging the Treaty of Waitangi and somewhat preceded the Māori protest movement as a whole. It established Waitangi Day, although it did not make it a public holiday, and the English text of the treaty appeared as a schedule of the Waitangi Day Act but this did not make the treaty a part of statute law. Subsequent amendments to the Act, as well as other legislation, eventually acquiesced to campaigns to make Waitangi Day a national holiday in 1976. More recently, the Treaty of Waitangi has been recognised for its role in establishing a legally and constitutionally pluralistic nation, bringing together the pre-existing Māori legal and constitutional system with the Westminster common law system introduced by the incoming British settlers.

==== The Treaty of Waitangi Act 1975 and the Waitangi Tribunal ====
During the late 1960s and 1970s, the Treaty of Waitangi became the focus of a strong Māori protest movement which rallied around calls for the government to "honour the treaty" and to "redress treaty grievances". Māori boycotted Waitangi Day in 1968 over the Māori Affairs Amendment Act (which was perceived as a further land grab) and Māori expressed their frustration about continuing violations of the treaty and subsequent legislation by government officials, as well as inequitable legislation and unsympathetic decisions by the Māori Land Court continuing alienation of Māori land from its owners. The protest movement can be seen as part of the worldwide civil rights movements, which emerged in the 1960s.

As a response to the protest movement, the treaty received recognition in 1975 with the passage of the Treaty of Waitangi Act 1975, which established the Waitangi Tribunal. The Tribunal had the power to make findings of fact and to make recommendations. It had jurisdiction to hear claims based on alleged breaches of the treaty occurring after 1975. The Act was amended in 1985 to enable the Waitangi Tribunal to investigate breaches of the Principles of the Treaty of Waitangi back to 1840, and also to increase the tribunal membership. The membership was further increased in another amendment in 1988.

==== Principles of the Treaty of Waitangi ====
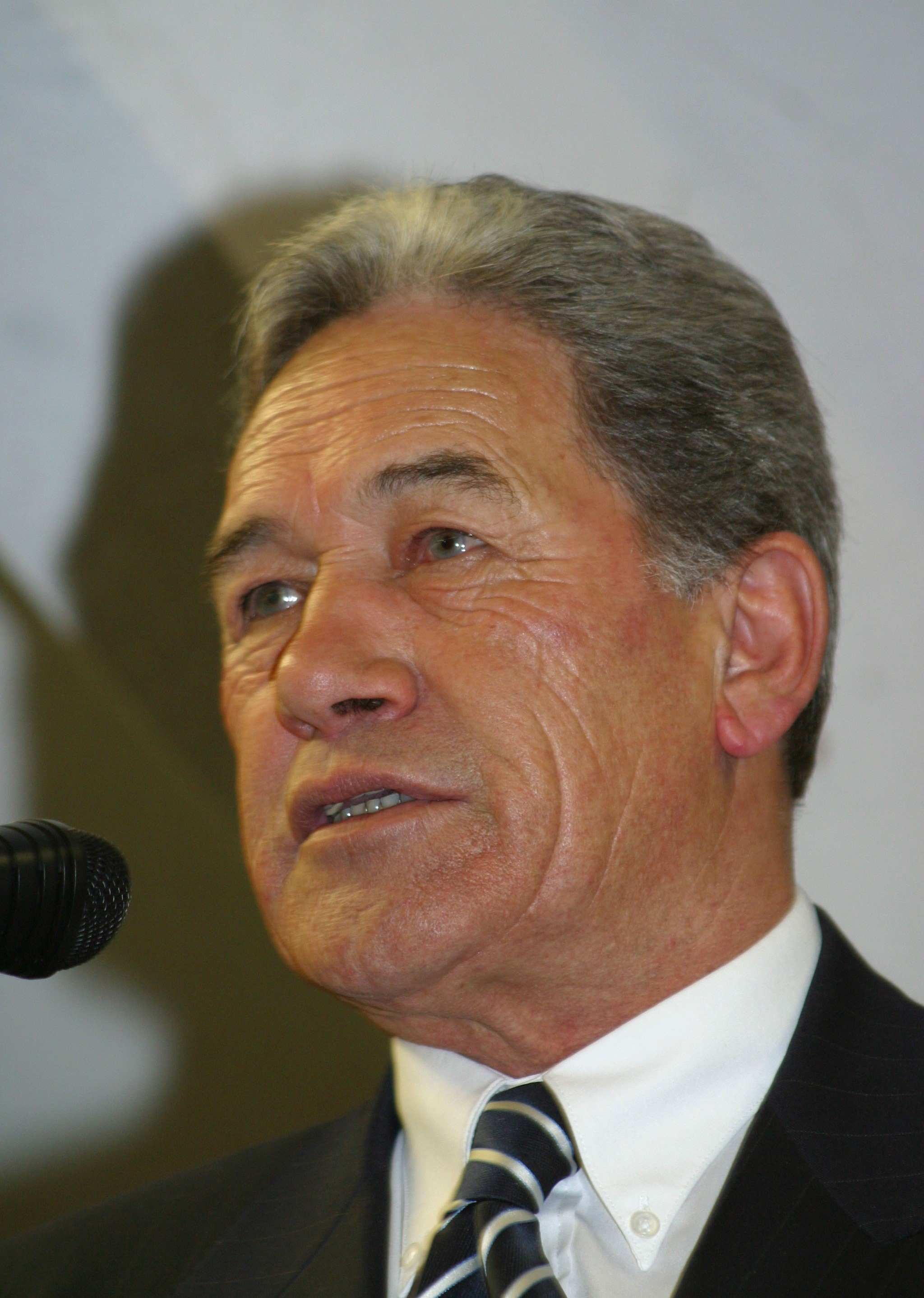
Winston Peters (founder of the New Zealand First Party), who has campaigned for the removal of references to the Treaty of Waitangi from New Zealand Law

The Treaty of Waitangi Act 1975 introduced the phrase Principles of the Treaty of Waitangi. It provides for the Waitangi Tribunal to determine claims that breached the Principles of the Treaty of Waitangi.

The Treaty of Waitangi Act 1975 provides for the intentions of the treaty to be taken into account through the principles of the Treaty of Waitangi. The Waitangi Tribunal's key function is to evaluate Crown actions against the intentions of the parties that signed the Treaty. The Tribunal also has the specific authority to determine the meaning of the two texts of the Treaty. Hayward (2004) states: "The Tribunal's findings ...are expressed in the currency of treaty principles – which principles are applicable to the particular case, and how the Crown breached those principles, if at all".

In order to apply the Treaty of Waitangi in a way that is relevant to the Crown and Māori in the present day, the Waitangi Tribunal and the courts must consider the broad sentiments, the intentions and the goals of the treaty, and then identify the relevant principles of the treaty on a case-by-case basis. Each Tribunal is required to determine the principles of each claim on a case-by-case basis.

The "Principles of the Treaty" have become a common topic in contemporary New Zealand politics. In 1989, the Fourth Labour Government published a report "Principles for Crown Action on the Treaty of Waitangi" a similar list of principles to that established in a 1987 court case. During the early 1990s, the government began to negotiate settlements of historical (pre-1992) claims. By 2021, the Treaty of Waitangi or its principles are referred to in over thirty five principal Acts. The ACT party has proposed a referendum on redefining the Principles of the Treaty of Waitangi.

==== Bill of Rights ====
Geoffrey Palmer argued that the treaty should be further incorporated as a part of the New Zealand constitution, to help improve relations between the Crown, Māori and other New Zealanders. The Fourth Labour Government's Bill of Rights White Paper proposed that the treaty be entrenched in the New Zealand Bill of Rights Act 1990. This proposal was never carried through to the legislation, with the attitude of many Māori towards it "suspicious, uneasy, doubtful or undecided". Many Māori were concerned that the proposal would relegate the treaty to a lesser position, and enable the electorate (who under the original Bill of Rights would be able to repeal certain sections by referendum) to remove the treaty from the Bill of Rights altogether. Geoffrey Palmer commented in 2013 that:

We were obliged, due to Māori opposition, to drop the Treaty from the Bill of Rights. That was a great pity and it is a step that I advocate be taken still in the context of having a superior law Bill of Rights.

During the 1990s there was broad agreement between major political parties that the settlement of historical claims was appropriate. Some disagreed however, and claims of a "Treaty of Waitangi grievance industry", which profits from making frivolous claims of violations of the Treaty of Waitangi, were made by a number of political figures in the late 1990s and early 2000s, including former National Party leader Don Brash in his 2004 "Orewa Speech". In 2005, New Zealand First MP Doug Woolerton introduced the "Principles of the Treaty of Waitangi Deletion Bill" in the New Zealand Parliament as a private member's bill. Winston Peters, the 13th Deputy Prime Minister of New Zealand, and others supported the bill, which was designed to remove references to the treaty from New Zealand law. The bill failed to pass its second reading in November 2007.

==== Public opinion ====
In terms of public opinion, a study in 2008 found that among the 2,700 voting age New Zealanders surveyed, 37.4% wanted the treaty removed from New Zealand law, 19.7% were neutral, and 36.8% wanted the treaty kept in law; additionally, 39.7% agreed Māori deserved compensation, 15.7% were neutral, and 41.2% disagreed. In 2017, the same study found that among the 3,336 voting age New Zealanders surveyed, 32.99% wanted the treaty removed from New Zealand law, 14.45% were neutral and 42.58% disagreed, and 9.98% didn't know.

Today, the treaty is still not specifically part of New Zealand domestic law, but has been adopted into various Acts of Parliament ad hoc. It is nevertheless regarded as a founding document of New Zealand.

A 2026 RNZ-Reid Research poll, found that 38% said the Treaty of Waitangi has too much influence over government decision making. The Poll also found that 34% said it was about the right amount, 16% said it had too little. 11% said they don't know.

== Commemoration ==
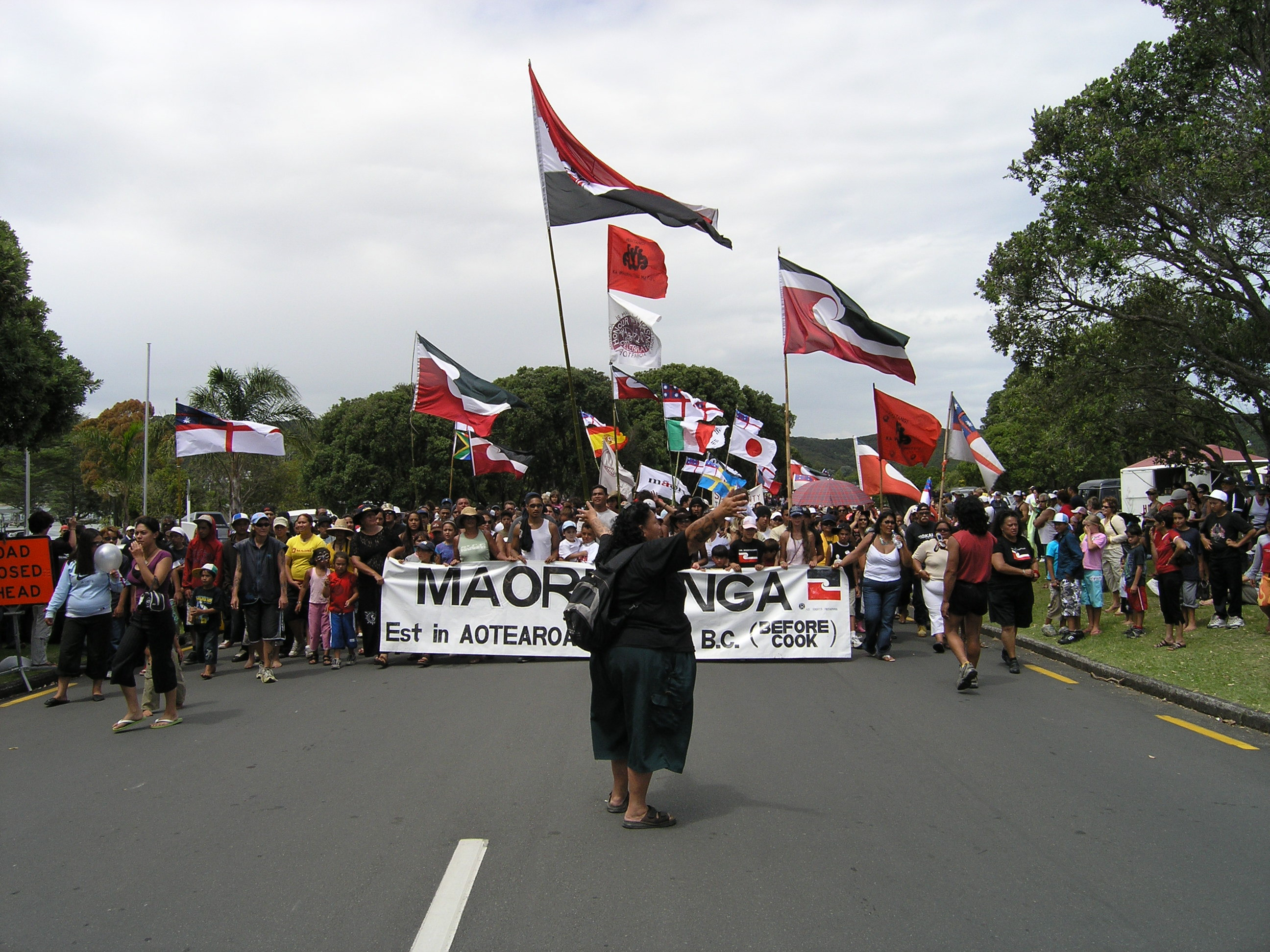
A protest on Waitangi Day 2006

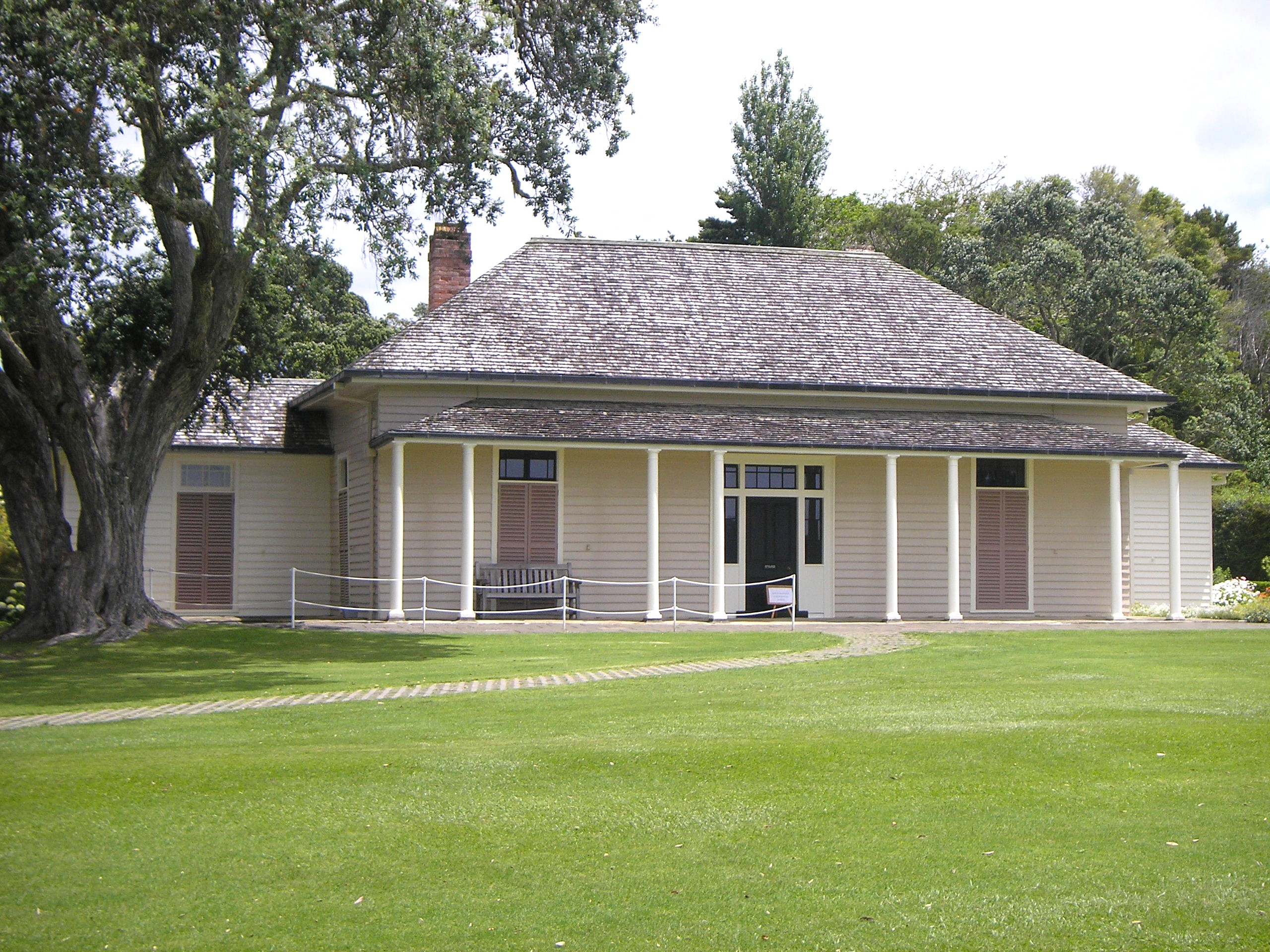
The restored Treaty House

The anniversary of the signing of the treaty—6 February—is the New Zealand national day, Waitangi Day. The day was first commemorated in 1934, when the site of the original signing, Treaty House, was made a public reserve (along with its grounds). However, it was not until 1974 that the date was made a public holiday. Waitangi Day has been the focus of protest by Māori (as was particularly the case from the 1970s through to the 1990s), but today the day is often used as an opportunity to discuss the history and lasting effects of the treaty. The Waitangi crown, a 1935 commemorative coin, was issued in honour of the treaty. The treaty was added to UNESCO's Memory of the World International Register in 1997, becoming one of the first inscriptions from New Zealand. It is also on the national Memory of the World register, Memory of the World Aotearoa New Zealand Ngā Mahara o te Ao.

== See also ==
- Constitution of New Zealand
- Te Ture Whenua Māori Act 1993
- Waitangi Tribunal
- Treaty of Waitangi claims and settlements
- He Whakaputanga, a.k.a. Declaration of the Independence of New Zealand
- Littlewood Treaty Document, an English version of Treaty text rediscovered in 1989
