= Littlewood Treaty Document =

The Littlewood Treaty Document, also known as the Littlewood Document, is an English language version of the text of the Treaty of Waitangi that was rediscovered in 1989. It is dated 4 February 1840, which led to speculation that it is the final English draft of the Treaty that Lieutenant Governor William Hobson gave to Henry Williams on the afternoon of 4 February to translate into the Māori language prior to it being read out to the Māori chiefs on 5 February, and prior to the signing, which took place on 6 February 1840. However, historian Don Loveridge has concluded that it is a translation of the Māori version of the treaty back into English.

The document was rediscovered among Littlewood family papers in 1989 and first appeared publicly in 1992. Phil Parkinson of the Alexander Turnbull Library identified, in 2000, the handwriting as being that of James Busby, the British Resident, who helped draft the Treaty of Waitangi with Hobson. The document ends with, "Done at Waitangi on the 4th Feb 1840". The text is virtually identical to the English text of the Treaty that James Reddy Clendon, the United States Consul to New Zealand, dispatched to the United States on 20 February 1840, except for the date at the end, which Clendon's copy had as 6 February instead of 4 February. Clendon noted that his copy was a translation from the Māori language version of the Treaty; this was supported by Parkinson, who studied several contemporary translations from the Māori version.

As far as is known, the English version of the treaty was completed on 4 February. It was given to Henry Williams at about 4 pm that day for him to translate into Māori ready for a meeting at Waitangi the next day, 5 February. The document handed to Williams for translation is not known to have survived. It has been speculated that the Littlewood document is the one handed to Williams. However, this is contradicted by the fact that it is virtually identical (except for the date) to the document that Clendon said was a translation from the Māori version, which Parkinson supports. Loveridge concluded that the date was probably an error, which Clendon corrected in the copy that he dispatched to the United States.

Loveridge agreed with Parkinson that the Littlewood document "is of historical interest but is of no constitutional significance."
