= Marupō =

Marupō was a Māori leader of the Ngāpuhi iwi (tribe) in northern New Zealand.

At the first signing of the Treaty of Waitangi on 6 February 1840, Marupō gave a concerted physical display and vocal attack against the treaty. He signed the Treaty of Waitangi later that day, and signed it for a second time on 12 February 1840 in his local area of Māngungu, Hokianga.
