= Waitangi Day Acts =

Act of Parliament in New Zealand

Waitangi Day Act 1960

New Zealand Parliament
- Long title: An Act to provide for the commemoration of the signing of the Treaty of Waitangi
- Commenced: Immediate

Legislative history
- Introduced by: Walter Nash
- Passed: 1960

Amended by
- 1963

Related legislation
- New Zealand Day Act 1973, Waitangi Day Act 1976
- Status: Repealed

There have been two Waitangi Day acts passed by the New Zealand Parliament: the Waitangi Day Act 1960 and the Waitangi Day Act 1976. Neither made 6 February (Waitangi Day) a public holiday; this was done by the New Zealand Day Act 1973. The first Waitangi Day act acknowledged the Treaty of Waitangi. The second changed the name of the day from New Zealand Day back to Waitangi Day.

== Waitangi Day Act 1960 ==
For some years before 1960, Māori, especially Ngāpuhi, had campaigned for Waitangi Day to be a public holiday in recognition of the Treaty of Waitangi. The promise of a public holiday was part of Labour's 1957 election manifesto. Labour was subsequently elected as the second Labour government, but decided that New Zealand could not afford another public holiday. The Waitangi Day Act was a compromise which allowed them to claim they had kept their promise, without actually creating a holiday.

The act consisted of three clauses and established that the sixth of February would be known as Waitangi Day and 'shall be observed throughout New Zealand as a national day of thanksgiving in commemoration of the signing of the Treaty of Waitangi.'

It did not make Waitangi Day a public holiday, but allowed the Governor-General to declare it one in any region, in substitute for that region's anniversary public holiday. The act contained the English-language version of the Treaty of Waitangi as a schedule, the first time that the Treaty had appeared anywhere in New Zealand legislation.

Māori were generally disappointed by the act, and continued to press for a public holiday. The National Party opposition spent most of the debate on the act criticising the government for breaking their promise, but also felt that New Zealand could not afford another public holiday.

=== 1963 Amendment ===
In 1963 the second National government amended the act to make Waitangi Day a holiday in Northland, abolishing the Auckland Anniversary Day holiday in that area.

Waitangi Day Act 1976

New Zealand Parliament
- Long title: An Act to make provision for the observance of the 6th day of February in each year as a public holiday to commemorate the signing of the Treaty of Waitangi
- Commenced: Immediate

Legislative history
- Introduced by: Allan Highet
- Passed: 1976

Related legislation
- Holidays Act 1955, Waitangi Day Act 1960, New Zealand Day Act 1973
- Status: Current legislation

== Waitangi Day Act 1976 ==
In 1973 the New Zealand Day Act made the day a public holiday and renamed it New Zealand Day, and also abolished the Waitangi Day Act 1960. Many Māori felt that the new name drew attention away from the Treaty of Waitangi, and campaigned for the name to be changed back. Following a change of government in 1975, the new National government passed the Waitangi Day Act 1976, which changed the name of the day back to Waitangi Day. It also gave Northland its own anniversary day holiday and included the English and Māori language versions of the Treaty of Waitangi as a schedule.

== Debate on the bills ==
- New Zealand Parliamentary Debates, vol. 325 (1960), pp. 2949–3132.
- New Zealand Parliamentary Debates, vol. 404 (1976), pp. 1367–79.
- New Zealand Parliamentary Debates, vol. 405 (1976), pp. 2272–9.
- New Zealand Parliamentary Debates, vol. 407 (1976), pp. 3215, 3424.

== See also ==
- Public holidays in New Zealand
- Waitangi Day
- Treaty of Waitangi
