= Waitangi Day =

National day of New Zealand

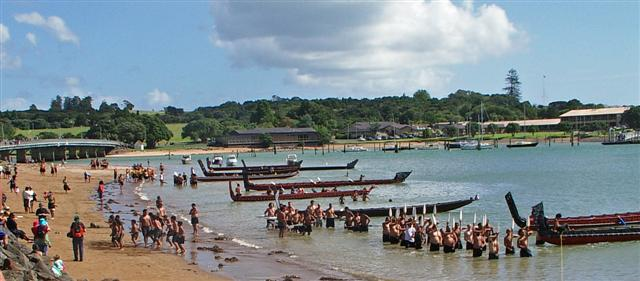
- Traditional celebrations at Waitangi
- Observed by: New Zealanders
- Type: National
- Significance: Commemorates the signing of the Treaty of Waitangi, regarded as the nation's founding document
- Observances: Hui (including at Te Tii marae); Family gatherings; Citizenship ceremonies
- Date: 6 February
- Next time: 6 February 2027
- Frequency: Annual
- First time: 1934

Waitangi Day (Māori: Te Rā o Waitangi), the national day of New Zealand, marks the anniversary of the initial signing of the Treaty of Waitangi on 6 February 1840. The Treaty of Waitangi was an agreement towards British sovereignty by representatives of the Crown and indigenous Māori chiefs, and so is regarded by many as the founding document of the nation.

Waitangi Day was first celebrated in 1934, and it was made a national public holiday in 1974. The anniversary is marked annually on 6 February, and a public holiday is observed on the day, or if the date falls on a Saturday or Sunday then the following Monday is observed.

Ceremonies take place at Waitangi and elsewhere to commemorate the signing of the treaty. A variety of events are held, including parties, Māori hui (social gatherings), reflections on New Zealand history, official awards and citizenship ceremonies. The commemoration has also been the focus of protest by Māori activists, and is occasionally the focus of controversy.

== History ==
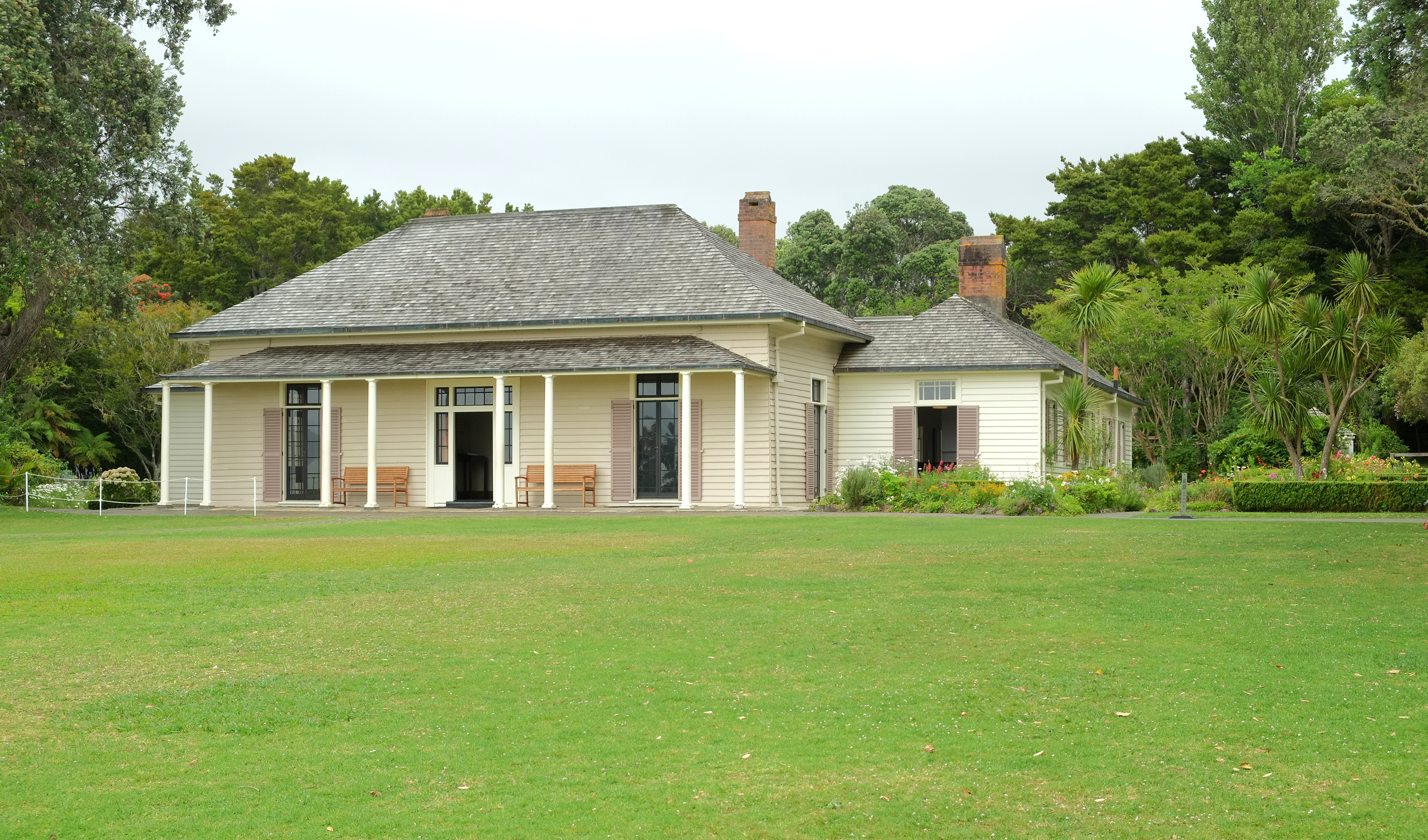
Treaty House and grounds at Waitangi, where the treaty was first signed. The first Waitangi Day was celebrated in the grounds on 6 February 1934.

The Treaty of Waitangi (Māori: Te Tiriti o Waitangi) was first signed on 6 February 1840 on the grounds of James Busby's house—now known as Treaty House—at Waitangi, in the Bay of Islands. The treaty was signed by representatives acting on behalf of the British Crown and, initially, by about 45 Māori chiefs. Over the course of the next seven months, copies of the treaty were toured around the New Zealand archipelago by the British, and eventually around 540 Māori chiefs would sign. The signing had the effect of securing British sovereignty over the islands of New Zealand, which was officially proclaimed by the Lieutenant-Governor of New Zealand, William Hobson, on 21 May 1840.

=== Previous celebrations ===
Prior to 1934, most celebrations of New Zealand's founding as a colony were held on 29 January, the date on which William Hobson arrived in the Bay of Islands to issue the proclamation of his appointment, which had been prepared by colonial office officials in England. Hobson had no draft treaty. From the British perspective the proclamation was the key legal document, "what the treaty said was less important".

In 1932, Governor-General Lord Bledisloe and his wife purchased and presented to the nation the run-down house of James Busby, where the treaty was initially signed. They subsequently donated £500 to restore the building. The Treaty House and grounds were made a public reserve, which was dedicated on 6 February 1934. This event is considered to be the first Waitangi Day.

In 1940, another event was held at the grounds, commemorating the 100th anniversary of the treaty signing. The event was a success and helped raise the profile of the treaty and its day of observance in the national consciousness.

=== Annual commemorations ===
Annual commemorations of the treaty signing began in 1947. The 1947 event was a Royal New Zealand Navy ceremony centring on a flagpole which the Navy had paid to erect in the grounds. The ceremony was brief and featured no Māori. The following year, a Māori speaker was added to the line-up, and subsequent additions to the ceremony were made nearly every year. From 1952, the governor-general attended, and from 1958 the prime minister also attended, although not every year. From the mid-1950s, a Māori cultural performance was usually given as part of the ceremony. Many of these early features remain a part of Waitangi Day ceremonies, including a naval salute, the Māori cultural performance (now usually a pōwhiri, a ceremonial welcome), and speeches from a range of Māori and Pākehā (non-Māori) dignitaries.

=== Proposed as public holiday ===
The Labour Party stated in its 1957 election manifesto that it would make Waitangi Day a public holiday. After winning that year's election, the party said that the country could not afford another public holiday (see the Black Budget). The Waitangi Day Act of 1960 allowed localities to transfer the holiday from their existing regional public holiday to Waitangi Day.

In 1963, after a change of government, the passing of the Waitangi Day Amendment Act transferred the holiday observed in Northland on Auckland Anniversary Day (the Monday closest to 29 January) to Waitangi Day, 6 February. This made Waitangi Day a holiday in Northland only.

=== Transition to public holiday ===
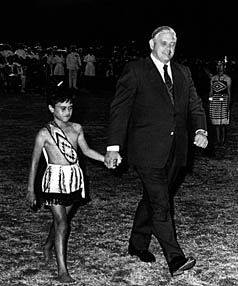
Norman Kirk and a Māori boy on Waitangi Day, 1973

Waitangi Day became a nationwide public holiday on its observance in 1974 by first undergoing a name change. In 1971 the Labour shadow minister of Māori Affairs, Matiu Rata, introduced a private member's bill to make Waitangi Day a national holiday, to be called New Zealand Day. This was not passed into law.

After the 1972 election of the third Labour government under Prime Minister Norman Kirk, it was announced that from 1974, Waitangi Day would be a national holiday known as New Zealand Day. The New Zealand Day Act legislation was passed in 1973. For Kirk, the change was simply an acceptance that New Zealand was ready to move towards a broader concept of nationhood. Diplomatic posts had for some years marked the day, and it seemed timely in view of the country's increasing role on the international stage that the national day be known as New Zealand Day. At the 1974 commemorations, the Flag of New Zealand was flown for the first time at the top of the flagstaff at Waitangi, rather than the Union Jack, and a replica of the flag of the United Tribes of New Zealand was also flown.

The election of the third National government in 1975 led to the day being renamed Waitangi Day because the new prime minister, Robert Muldoon, did not like the name "New Zealand Day" and many Māori felt that it debased the treaty. Another Waitangi Day Act was passed in 1976 to change the name back to Waitangi Day and restore Northland's anniversary day holiday to that of Auckland.

Waitangi Day underwent 'Mondayisation' in legislation enacted in 2013, meaning the public holiday is observed on the following Monday if 6 February falls on a Saturday or Sunday.

== Commemorations ==
=== At Waitangi ===
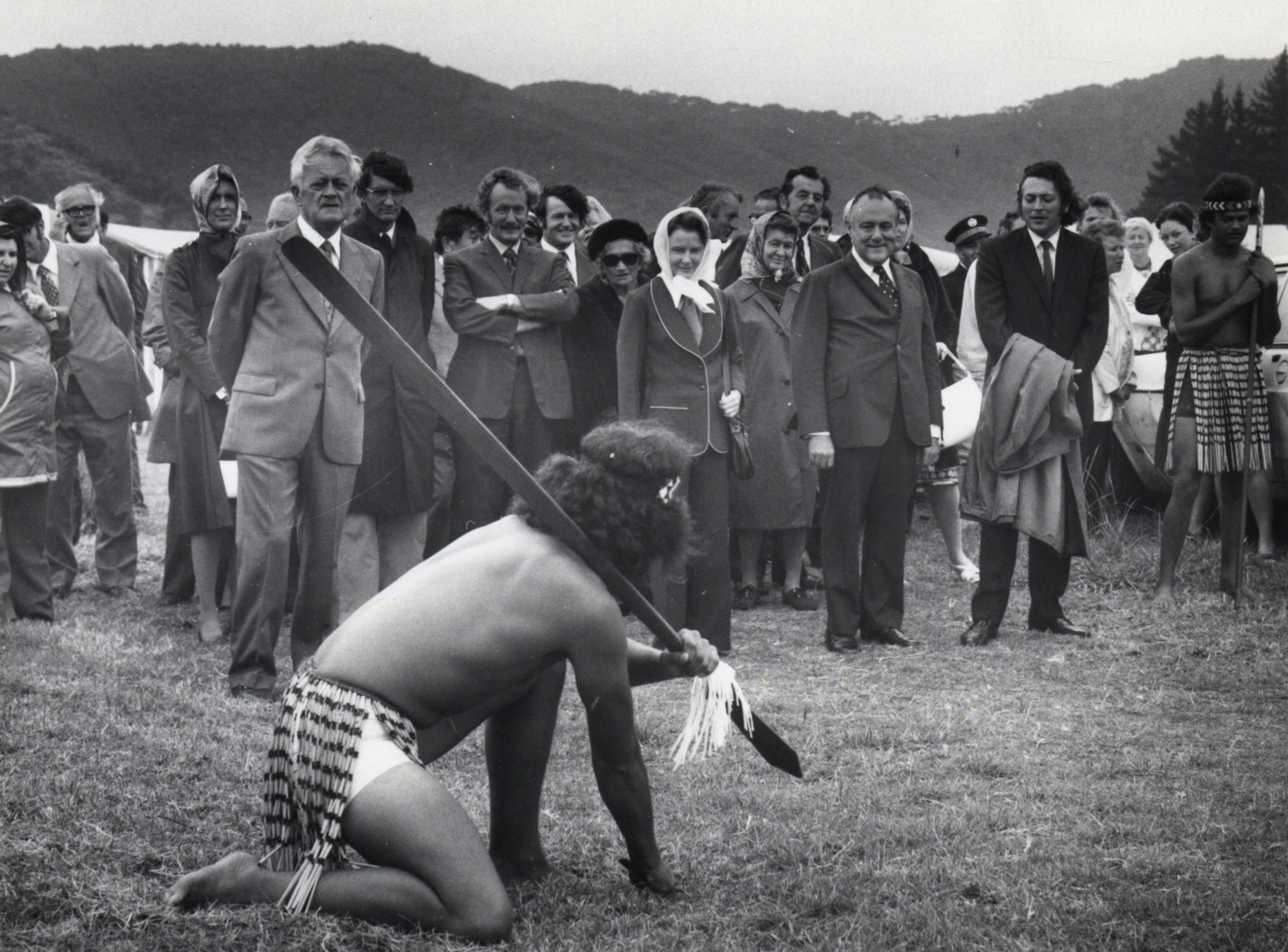
The challenge at Waitangi Day, 1976, with Prime Minister Robert Muldoon present

Commemorations at Waitangi usually commence two or three days before Waitangi Day. At Te Tii Waitangi marae, on the southern side of the Waitangi River, political dignitaries are welcomed onto the marae and hear speeches from the local iwi. These speeches often deal with the issues of the day, and vigorous and robust debate occurs. Politicians are usually granted speaking rights, but on occasion, the privilege has been withdrawn, as with Leader of the Opposition Helen Clark in 1999, Prime Ministers John Key in 2016, and Bill English in 2017. In recent years, the official pōwhiri, or welcome ceremony, for members of parliament has moved from Te Tii Waitangi (sometimes referred to as the "lower marae") to Te Whare Rūnanga (sometimes referred to as the "upper marae", even though it is not a true marae) at the treaty grounds, which are north of the Waitangi River. In 2018, Jacinda Ardern was the first Prime Minister to attend the commemorations in three years. According to The Guardian, "Under Ardern the celebration has taken on a more conciliatory tone, with the prime minister usually spending several days at the treaty grounds listening to Māori leaders and in 2018 memorably asking those gathered to hold her government to account."

On Waitangi Day, a public service is held at dawn, organised by the Waitangi National Trust, attended by Māori elders and leaders, religious leaders, politicians, members of the diplomatic corps, and defence force personnel. In 2021, this included hīmene (hymns), religious readings, and prayers in many languages. The Royal New Zealand Navy raised flags on the flagstaff in the treaty grounds. Since 2018, members of the government, including the prime minister and members of parliament and their families have served a barbeque breakfast to members of the public following the dawn service. Throughout the day, cultural displays such as kapa haka (Māori dance and song), wānanga (educational discussions), and other entertainment take place on stages throughout the treaty grounds. Several waka and sometimes a navy ship also take part in demonstrations in the harbour. The day closes with the flags being lowered by the Navy in a traditional ceremony.

=== Elsewhere in New Zealand ===
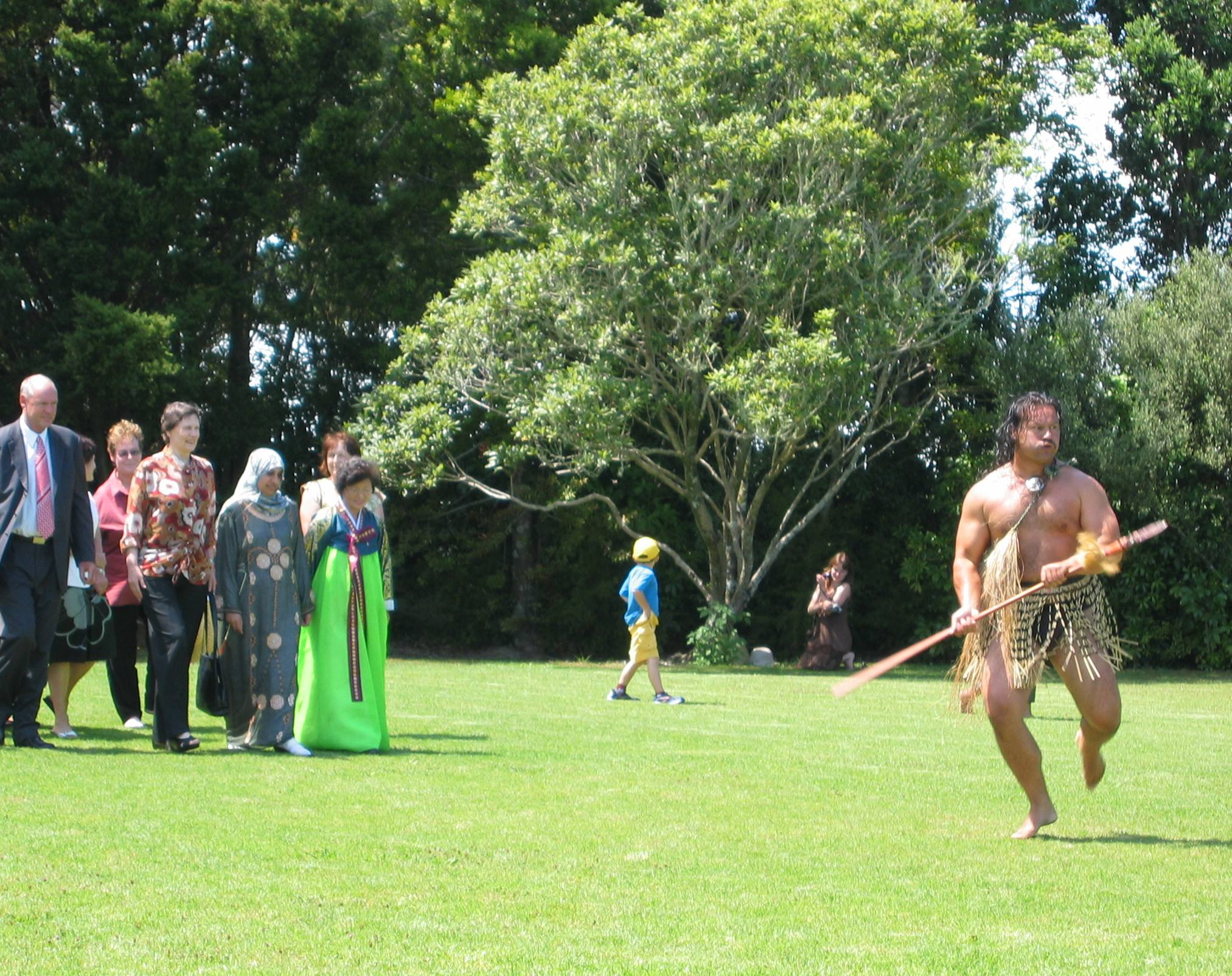
Prime Minister Helen Clark being welcomed onto Hoani Waititi Marae, in West Auckland, Waitangi Day 2006

Some marae use the day as an open day and an educational experience for their local communities, giving them the opportunity to experience Māori culture and protocol, or as an opportunity to explain where they see Māori are and the way forward for Māori in New Zealand. Commemorations are largely muted in comparison to those seen on the national days of most countries. There are no mass parades or firework displays, nor truly widespread commemorations.

City councils, museums, libraries and galleries across New Zealand put on free programmes of public events commemorating Waitangi Day for example in 2023 Waikato Museum had Māori weaving demonstrations with Te Roopu Aroha Ki Te Raranga, live music and a film screening of the movie Whina. In Wellington there was a concert at Waitangi Park called Te Rā o Waitangi, an outdoor film event, waka salutes at Whairepo Lagoon, and bilingual tours of the exhibition Te Tohu at the National Library to see the original 1840 Te Tiriti o Waitangi document.

The governor-general hosts an annual garden party for invited guests at Government House in Wellington. At Government House in Auckland, citizenship ceremonies are usually held. As the day is a public holiday, and coincides with the warmest part of the New Zealand summer, many people take the opportunity to spend the day at the beach—an important part of New Zealand culture.

Since 2014, the New Zealand Society of Authors awards the Waitangi Day Literary Honours on Waitangi Day.

=== In Australia ===
At the Kingston Butter Factory in Kingston, Queensland, the Te Korowai Aroha (Cloak of Love) Association held a multicultural festival to mark Waitangi Day annually from 2002. In Sydney, an estimated 8,000 people attended the 2013 Waitangi Day Festival at Holroyd Gardens. The festival featured displays of artefacts, performance of a haka, and Māori culture (cuisine, tattooing and wood carving). 6 February 2015 saw the inaugural Waitangi Day Commemoration held at Nurragingy Reserve, where the focus is more on the document itself, the treaty process and the significance to Māori and Pākehā today. It was co-hosted by the Blacktown City Council and the New South Wales Māori Wardens.

=== In the United Kingdom ===
In London, England, which has one of the largest New Zealand expatriate populations, the national day is commemorated by the Waitangi Day Charitable Ball, held by the New Zealand Society. The ball also hosts the annual UK New Zealander of the Year awards, cultural entertainment from London-based Māori group Ngāti Rānana, and fine wine and cuisine from New Zealand. Additionally, a service is held by the society at the church of St Lawrence Jewry.

A tradition, observed for more than 30 years as of 2016, takes place on the closest Saturday to 6 February: New Zealanders, predominately Pākehā, participate in a pub crawl using the London Underground's Circle Line. Some controversy has arisen over the respectfulness of the drunken performance of an unpracticed haka.

=== Elsewhere in the world ===
In many other countries with a New Zealand expatriate population, Waitangi Day is commemorated privately. The day is officially commemorated by all New Zealand embassies and high commissions.

For Waitangi Day 2007, Air New Zealand commissioned a number of New Zealanders living in Los Angeles and Southern California to create a sand sculpture of a silver fern on the Santa Monica Beach, creating a stir in the surrounding area.

== Controversy and protest ==
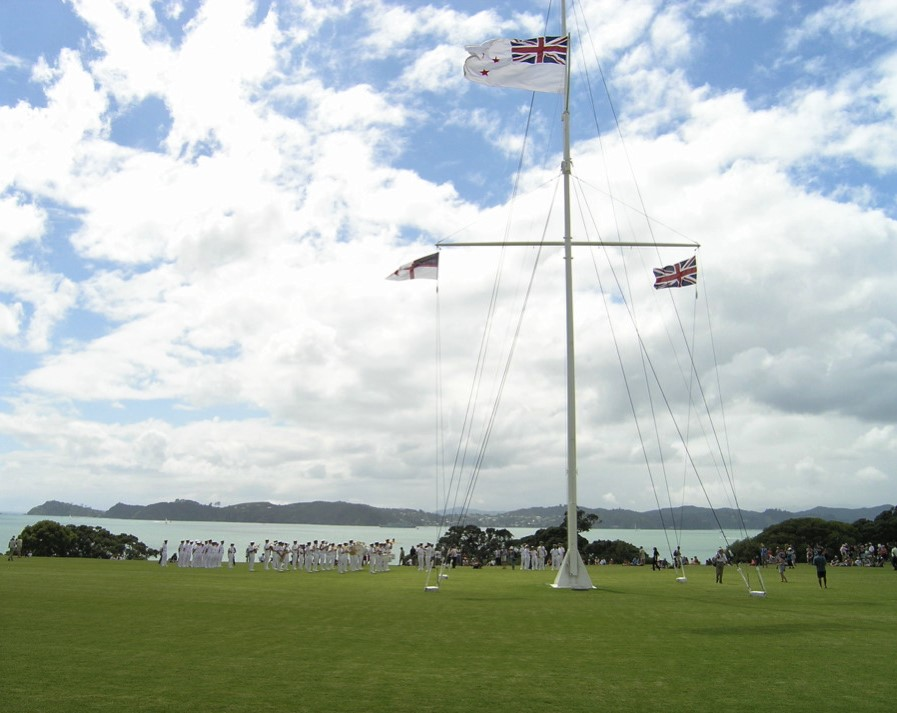
The flagstaff at Waitangi, the focus of significant protest. On the flagstaff is flown, from left, the Flag of the United Tribes of New Zealand; the Ensign of the Royal New Zealand Navy, and the Union Flag.

By 1971, Waitangi and Waitangi Day had become a focus of protest concerning treaty injustices, with Ngā Tamatoa leading early protests. After a walkout from the ceremony in 1972, Governor General Arthur Porritt responded saying "I just do not believe that racism or discrimination exists in this country," demonstrating the gap in mutual understanding. Activists initially called for greater recognition of the treaty, but by the early 1980s, they were also arguing that it was a fraud and the means by which Pākehā had conned Māori out of their land. Attempts were made by groups, including the Waitangi Action Committee, to halt the commemorations. A hīkoi travelled from Tūrangawaewae Marae to the treaty grounds in 1984, in protest of Waitangi Day celebrations. With support from the Waitangi Action Committee, the New Zealand Māori Council, the Māori Women's Welfare League and the Kīngitanga, the number of marchers grew to 2000 people. Growing protests led to confrontations between police and protesters, sometimes resulting in dozens of arrests.

When the treaty gained greater official recognition in the mid-1980s, emphasis switched back to calls to honour it, and protesters generally returned to the aim of raising awareness of it and what they saw as its neglect by the state. In 1990, a young Māori woman threw a wet black t-shirt at Queen Elizabeth II during her visit to Waitangi, in an effort to "galvanize the country’s attention toward Maori problems" and "get justice under the Treaty of Waitangi." In 1995, the threat of protests was so intense that security could not be assured and the ceremony was preempted.

Some New Zealand politicians and commentators, such as Paul Holmes, have felt that Waitangi Day is too controversial to be a national day and have sought to replace it with Anzac Day. Others, for example the United Future Party's Peter Dunne, have suggested that the name be changed back to New Zealand Day.

=== Recent activism ===
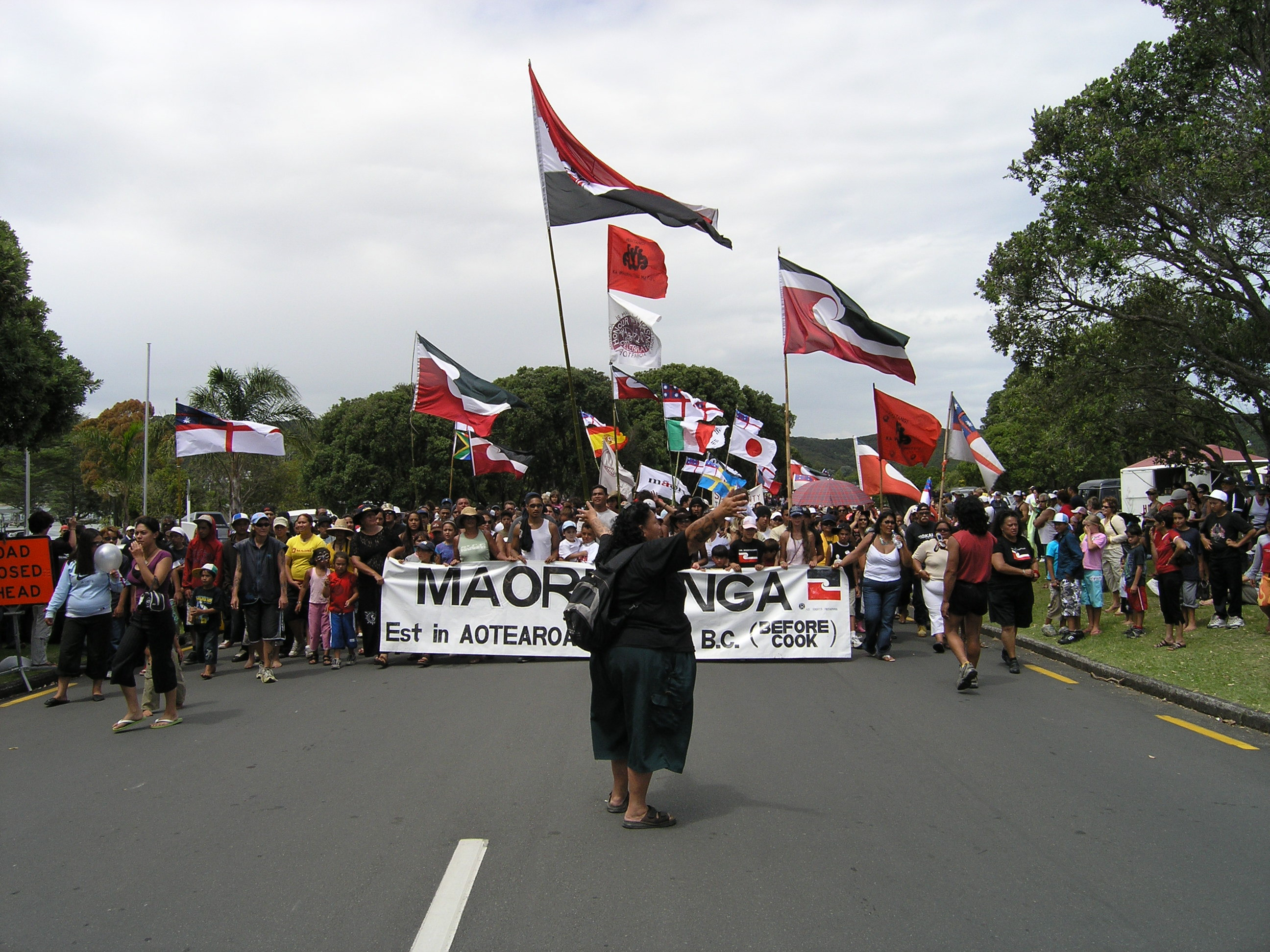
Māori protestors in 2006

Waitangi Day celebrations have long been an opportunity for Māori to highlight issues important to Māori, including breaches of the treaty, persistent inequality, high Māori incarceration rates, and advocating for constitutional change which entrench the Treaty of Waitangi. In the past, attempts to vandalise the flagstaff have been an objective of these protests, carrying on a tradition that dates from the 19th century when Hōne Heke chopped down the British flagstaff in nearby Russell. In 2004, protesters succeeded in flying the national Māori flag (known as the tino rangatiratanga flag, referring to Māori sovereignty) above the other flags on the flagstaff by flying it from the top of a nearby tree.

Because of the level of protest activity that had previously occurred at Waitangi, Prime Minister Helen Clark did not attend in 2000. The official commemorations were shifted from Waitangi to Wellington for 2001. Some Māori felt that this was an insult to them and to the treaty. In 2003 and 2004, the anniversary was again officially commemorated at the treaty grounds at Waitangi. In 2004, Leader of the Opposition Don Brash was hit with mud as he entered Te Tii Waitangi marae as a response to his controversial Orewa Speech that year.

On 5 February 2009, the day before Waitangi Day, as Prime Minister John Key was being escorted onto the marae, he was challenged and jostled by two nephews of Māori Party MP Hone Harawira. Both admitted to assault and were sentenced to 100 hours of community service. In 2011, the pair again heckled Key as he entered the marae. A wet T-shirt thrown at Queen Elizabeth II and other attacks on various prime ministers at Waitangi on 6 February have resulted in a large police presence and a large contingent of the armed forces on some years. In 2016 a nurse protesting against the proposed signing of the TPPA trade agreement threw a rubber dildo at Steven Joyce, the MP representing Prime Minister John Key, who had refused to attend, having been denied normal speaking rights. The woman was arrested but later released.

In 2018, Prime Minister Jacinda Ardern visited Waitangi for five days, the longest any prime minister has stayed. Titewhai Harawira, a Māori activist, greeted Ardern and escorted her onto the treaty grounds holding hands—a significant change from Harawira's response to Helen Clark's visit in 1998, which brought Clark to tears. Ardern is also the first female prime minister to be given speaking rights on the marae by Ngāpuhi, who also offered to bury her child's placenta on the treaty grounds. Ardern was praised for her speech during her visit where she said "one day I want to be able to tell my child that I earned the right to stand here, and only you can tell me when I have done that".

== See also ==
- New Zealand Day Act 1973
- Waitangi Day Acts
