= Fireworks in New Zealand =

In New Zealand, fireworks are used on Guy Fawkes Night, an annual tradition originating in England that celebrates the failure of Guy Fawkes, a member of the Gunpowder Plot, to blow up the House of Lords. Many New Zealanders, however, are unaware of the origins of this tradition. Other uses of fireworks take place at New Year, as well as during Māori new year festival, Matariki. As New Zealand has become more multicultural, the use of fireworks for Diwali, a Hindu festival of lights, and Chinese New Year has increased.

Fireworks can only be sold to people aged 18 and over, and only for four days a year, from 2 November to 5 November (before and during Guy Fawkes Night). Fireworks can, however, be used throughout the year. Since 1994, skyrockets and firecrackers have been banned. In a 2023 poll conducted by AA Insurance, 53% of respondents said that they wanted fireworks banned for private recreational use and 20% of respondents said that they wanted an outright ban on fireworks in New Zealand.

== Usage ==
=== Events ===
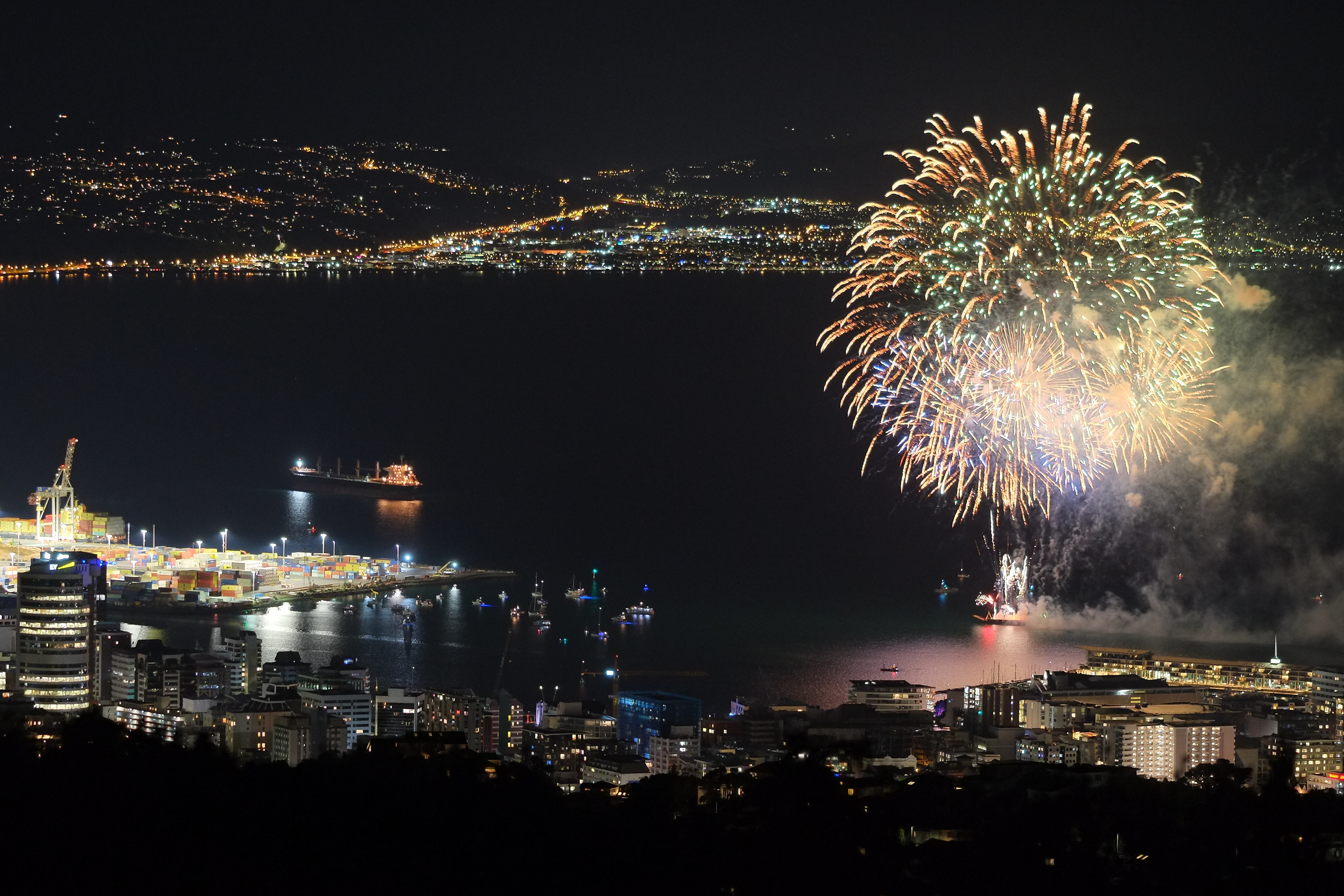
Fireworks over Wellington Harbour for Matariki in 2022, the first year it was a public holiday

Fireworks in New Zealand are set off annually on Guy Fawkes Night, on 5 November. The tradition, which originated in England, celebrates the failure of Guy Fawkes in 1605 O.S. to blow up the House of Lords as part of the Gunpowder Plot which also intended to assassinate King James VI of Scotland and I of England. Many New Zealanders however are unaware of the origins of the event and simply see it as a time to set off fireworks. This tradition was brought to New Zealand by British settlers in the 19th century, and so was setting off fireworks on the New Year. Fireworks are also used for Matariki, the Māori new year festival. In 1903 for Empire Day, the scientist Alexander William Bickerton created a firework display at Lancaster Park.

Chinese immigrants brought fireworks to the country in the 19th century and set them off for Chinese New Year. Fireworks are also used by some Indians for Diwali, a Hindu festival of lights. The use of fireworks for more international events like these has been growing as New Zealand has become more multicultural.

=== Statistics ===
In 2024 the Ministry for the Environment released a report that stated that in 2023, 575,544 kilograms (1,268,857 lb) of fireworks were imported, an increase since 2022 of 52 per cent. The report also found that in 2023, 106 fires caused by fireworks were reported, 341 Accident Compensation Corporation (ACC) claims were lodged and that the New Zealand Police received 1572 calls relating to fireworks. While it found that the amount of injuries had increased since 2022, the number of accidents since the year 2000 had been in decline.

== Regulation ==
Fireworks can only be sold from 2 November to 5 November (before and during Guy Fawkes Night) and can only be sold to people aged 18 and over. The fireworks must be tested and have been proved that they comply with the Hazardous Substances (Fireworks) Regulations 2001. Sparklers can only be sold if they are packaged with other fireworks. In most places in the country, fireworks can be set off on private property throughout the year but are banned in beaches and public parks.

=== History ===
The use of fireworks was first restricted in New Zealand in the 19th century, with the maximum fine in 1850 for illegally using fireworks in a public place being £5, equivalent to several hundred dollars in 2019 terms.

In the 1960s several groups, including fire authorities, the SPCA and women's groups began advocating for the public sale of fireworks to be restricted, citing property damage and injuries to children and animals. In 1969 a bill that proposed restricting the sale to two weeks before Guy Fawkes Night was rejected by Parliament. Around this time Beverly Pentland, a solo mother from Petone, started advocating for the restriction of fireworks and began visiting hundreds of schools to educate children about the dangers of fireworks. She became known as the "Fireworks Lady" to children and used pamphlets in the style of comics to engage youth. With encouragement from Pentland, The Explosives Amendment Bill was passed in 1973, which, when it came into effect in 1974, banned the sale of fireworks until 10 days before Guy Fawkes. She continued her education programme and advocated for the sale of fireworks to be restricted to those at or above the age of 16. In 1985 the Explosives (Fireworks Safety) Amendment Bill was passed which led to this age restriction coming into effect, but Pentland had died the year prior. She was appointed a Member of the Most Excellent Order of the British Empire (MBE) in the 1975 New Year Honours list.

In both 1994 and 1996 Parliament debated whether the public sale of fireworks should be banned. They decided that the irresponsible use of fireworks by a minority of the population should not remove the right for most residents to responsibly use fireworks. In 1994 skyrockets and firecrackers were banned.

Starting in 2001, fireworks could be sold for 10 days a year and to people aged 14 and over. In 2006, the amount of days that fireworks could be sold per year was reduced to four: from 2 November to 5 November (before and during Guy Fawkes Night). Also in 2006 the minimum age that purchasers of fireworks could be was increased to 18.

Since 2014, the use of fireworks in Auckland's forests, conservation areas and roads has been prohibited. Since 2020, the Auckland Council has closed access to the ancestral mountains (Tūpuna Maunga o Tāmaki Makaurau) on Guy Fawkes Night due to previous vegetation fires. In 2019, Countdown (now named Woolworths) stopped selling fireworks, and so did The Warehouse in 2021. Both of these are amongst New Zealand's largest retailers.

In a 2023 poll conducted by AA Insurance, 53% of respondents said that they wanted fireworks banned for private recreational use and 20% of respondents said that they wanted an outright ban on fireworks in New Zealand. In June 2025 a petition with 90,000 signatures in support of a ban on the public sale of fireworks was presented to Parliament. The petition also included 80,000 animal paw prints.

In November 2025 the political party New Zealand First proposed the Fireworks Prohibition Legislation Bill which would ban the sale, importation and manufacture of fireworks to consumers. It would still allow the use of fireworks for public events. Winston Peters, the leader of the party, cited injuries to animals and the irresponsible use of fireworks by consumers as the reason for the proposal. NZ First reiterated its intent on banning the sale of fireworks in the lead up to the 2026 New Zealand general election, which was supported by the Green Party.
