= Public holidays in New Zealand =

- Also called: Statutory holidays, stat holidays
- Observed by: New Zealanders
- Type: National, regional
- Frequency: Twelve days a year (from 2022)

Public holidays in New Zealand (also known as statutory holidays) consist of a variety of cultural, national, and religious holidays that are legislated in New Zealand. Workers can get a maximum of 12 public holidays (eleven national holidays plus one provincial holiday) and a minimum of 20 annual leave days a year.

== History ==
Bank holidays in New Zealand originated with a celebration of St Andrew's Day in 1857. Nationwide public holidays began with the Bank Holidays Act 1873, which was based on the UK Bank Holidays Act 1871. Initially there was some resistance to it.

Anniversary days celebrated, from as early as 1843, the first arrivals of settlers in each province. By 1846 the Wellington Anniversary Day was described as having the appearance of an English Fair.

Half-holidays, or early closing days, were widespread from the 1900s to 1970s. They allowed 6 day weeks in shops and offices to include a half day off from 1 pm, on a day set by the local council. From the late 1840s the practice spread from Wellington and Christchurch. In the 1870s many towns adopted shopping half holidays, usually a Wednesday Thursday, or Saturday. From 1873 female factory workers had a half-holiday from 2 pm on Saturdays, from 1881 under-18s got it and, after 1891, the holiday started from 1 pm. The Shops and Shop Assistants Act 1892 gave shop assistants half-holidays starting at 1 pm, the shops themselves also being closed from 1894. From 1907 electors could set the day in local elections.

=== Matariki ===
In 2006, Māori Language Commissioner Haami Piripi proposed to make Matariki an official holiday. After public discussion, in 2009 a bill was introduced to make Matariki a public holiday; however, the bill was voted down at its first reading. Prime Minister Jacinda Ardern announced on 7 September 2020 that her government would create a new public holiday to celebrate Matariki should the Labour Party win the 2020 general election. Labour won the election, and in February 2021 Ardern announced that Matariki would become an annual public holiday with a variable date (June or July). The Matariki Public Holiday Bill received royal assent on 11 April 2022. The first Matariki public holiday was observed on 24 June 2022.

== National public holidays ==
Statutory holidays are legislated by the Holidays Act 2003.

| Date | Holiday | Trading restriction |
|---|---|---|
| 1 January (Note: Or the following Monday if it falls on a Saturday or Sunday.) | New Year's Day | No |
| 2 January (Note: Or the following Monday if it falls on a Saturday, or the following Tuesday if it falls on a Sunday.) | The Day after New Year's Day | No |
| 6 February | Waitangi Day | No |
| The Friday before Easter Sunday | Good Friday | Yes |
| The day after Easter Sunday | Easter Monday | No |
| 25 April | Anzac Day | Yes (until 1 pm) |
| The first Monday in June | King's Birthday | No |
| The closest Friday to the Tangaroa lunar calendar period of the correct lunar calendar month. | Matariki | No |
| The fourth Monday in October | Labour Day | No |
| 25 December | Christmas Day | Yes |
| 26 December | Boxing Day | No |

=== Mondayised ===
The holidays that fall on Saturday or Sunday are "Mondayised". Those that fall on a Monday through to Friday are commemorated on their proper date.

If the holiday falls on a weekend, and an employee does not work on the weekends, then the holiday is transferred to the following Monday or Tuesday. If the employee works on the weekends, then the holiday is taken on that day.

Christmas Day and New Years' Day have always been Mondayised holidays, and from 2013 Waitangi Day and Anzac Day are also Mondayised.

Waitangi Day and Anzac Day are always commemorated on the exact date, as they remember specific historical events. The statutory holidays, however, are Mondayised.

=== Pay ===
All workers who work on a public holiday must be paid time-and-a-half, and if it would otherwise be a normal working day for them, be given an alternative holiday (known as a day in lieu). Payment for the alternative holiday is equivalent relevant daily pay for the particular alternative day taken, had they have worked it.

=== Restricted trading days ===
There are special trading restrictions on Christmas Day, Good Friday, Easter Sunday (not a public holiday) and before 1 pm on Anzac Day. On those days, generally only dairies, petrol stations, pharmacies, restaurants, cafés, and shops within an airport or train station may open. All other shops including supermarkets must close.

Some shops open each year despite the law and are fined.

Certain areas have exemptions allowing them to trade one or more of the restricted days. These areas include Parnell Road in Parnell, Auckland, Paihia, Picton, and Queenstown. The Shop Trading Hours Commission decided where exemptions were to apply but it was shut down in 1990, leaving the existing exemptions in place but no longer having a mechanism for other places to apply. In 2016, regional councils were given the power to set Easter Sunday trading rules in their area. Around 44 councils, covering around one-third of the population, have set policy allowing trading on Easter Sunday.

Shops that can open on the restricted days are still subject to conditions and subject to any other law to the contrary. For example, alcohol can only be sold with a meal or to people staying on the premises overnight.

== Provincial anniversary days ==
In addition to the eleven national public holidays, section 44 of the Holidays Act 2003 specifies as public holidays the anniversary days of each province (or the day locally observed as that day) to celebrate the founding days or landing days of the first colonists of the various colonial provinces. These are only celebrated within each province, not nationwide. Exact dates of the various provinces' anniversary days are not specifically stated in the act, and are instead determined by historical convention and local custom. The regions covered are set by provincial district (as they stood when abolished in 1876), plus Southland, the Chatham Islands, South Canterbury, and Northland. The actual observance days can vary even within each province and is due to local custom, convenience or the proximity of seasonal events or other holidays and may differ from the official observance day.

| Provincial District | includes | Actual Day | Observance Day |
|---|---|---|---|
| Wellington Province | Wellington, Manawatū, Whanganui | 22 January | Monday nearest to the actual day |
| Auckland Province | Waikato, King Country, Coromandel, Bay of Plenty, Gisborne/East Coast | 29 January | Monday nearest to the actual day |
| Northland | Whangārei | 29 January | Monday nearest to the actual day |
| Nelson | Nelson, Tasman, Buller and parts of North Canterbury | 1 February | Monday nearest to the actual day |
| Otago Province | Dunedin, Queenstown | 23 March | Monday nearest to the actual day (this can vary if it would otherwise coincide with Easter Monday) |
| Southland | Invercargill, Bluff, Milford Sound, Fiordland | 25 March | Easter Tuesday |
| Taranaki (New Plymouth) | New Plymouth | 31 March | Second Monday in March – to avoid Easter |
| South Canterbury | Timaru | 25 September | Fourth Monday in September — Dominion Day |
| Hawke's Bay | Napier, Hastings | 1 November | Friday before Labour Day |
| Marlborough | Blenheim, Picton | 1 November | First Monday after Labour Day |
| Canterbury | Christchurch, Ashburton | 11 November | Christchurch Show Day (North Canterbury) |
| Canterbury | Christchurch, Ashburton | 11 November | Christchurch Show Day (Central Canterbury) |
| Canterbury | Christchurch, Ashburton | 11 November | Second Friday after the first Tuesday in November (Christchurch City) — to coincide with the Canterbury A&P Show. |
| Chatham Islands | Waitangi | 30 November | Monday nearest to the actual day |
| Westland | Hokitika, Greymouth | 1 December | Monday nearest to the actual day (Greymouth) |
| Westland | Hokitika, Greymouth | 1 December | Varies (outside Greymouth) |

== Annual leave and non-working days ==
In addition to the above holidays, from 1 April 2007 all workers must be given four weeks annual leave, often taken in the summer Christmas – New Year period. In many industries there is a Christmas – New Year shutdown of business. With only three working days between Christmas and New Year, many workers take this time off, as they can have a ten-day summer break for only three days leave. Many retail outlets also hold sales at this time to stimulate business while others close down due to low demand for services. The days from 25 December to 15 January are not considered to be working days for official government purposes. The public counters of most government departments do open on weekdays during this period, though often only a limited service may be available.

== School holidays ==
State schools have a 4-term year, of about ten weeks each and usually with a two-week holiday between terms. Although standard term dates are set by the Ministry of Education each year, schools can vary these to account for local holidays and school closures due to weather. The first term commences in late January or early February. Occasionally, Easter holidays and/or Anzac Day may fall within these holidays. The holiday between terms two and three is generally known as the midwinter break and occurs in July, while that between terms 3 and 4 occurs in late September, early October. Term four ends in mid December, generally a week or two before Christmas, though for many senior students this term ends after their final NCEA examination in late November or early December. From time to time, state schools are entitled to schedule a "teacher only" day for teacher training and administration. These days count as a public holiday for the students of that particular school -- who do not attend on that day -- but not for the teachers or the broader non-student population.

== One-off public holidays ==
A "one off" national public holiday, known as Queen Elizabeth II Memorial Day, was declared by the Prime Minister for 26 September 2022 to allow people to pay their respects for the passing of Queen Elizabeth II, the longest-reigning monarch of New Zealand. South Canterbury Anniversary Day, which was due to be observed on 26 September, was moved to be observed on Friday 11 November.

== Proposals for new holidays ==
Following the death of Sir Edmund Hillary in 2008, the Green Party proposed a public holiday in his honour. There is also support in some quarters for the old Dominion Day holiday to be revived as "New Zealand Day".

== Proposals for abolition of holidays ==
From the 1950s to the 1970s it was frequently suggested that the Provincial Anniversary holidays be abolished, as the Provinces ceased to exist in 1876.

Before Waitangi Day was made a national public holiday it was sometimes suggested that a Waitangi Day holiday should replace the anniversary days, and the Waitangi Day Act 1960 made provision for this. Waitangi Day was eventually made an additional holiday and the provincial holidays lived on, primarily because most regions had long established events on those weekends.

== See also ==
- List of unofficial observances in New Zealand
- Christmas in New Zealand
- Fireworks in New Zealand
