= Fleming v Beevers =

Cited case in New Zealand law

- Court: Court of Appeal of New Zealand
- Full case name: Fleming v Beevers
- Decided: 4 November 1993
- Citation: [1994] 1 NZLR 385

Court membership
- Judges sitting: Cooke P, Gault J, Tipping J

Fleming v Beevers [1994] 1 NZLR 385 is a cited case in New Zealand law regarding the doctrine of part performance.

== Background ==
Fleming and Beevers were in a de facto relationship for over 20 years. In 1989, the couple purchased a house in Queenstown, with Beevers financing his half by cashing in his superannuation policy, and Fleming borrowing the money for her half, which needed a guarantee from Beevers to secure the loan.

During the conveyancing process, both parties promised to leave their share in the house to the other partner in their will.

Beevers died a few months after buying the house and without drafting a new will. Without a new will, his share of the house would have been disposed under his last will, which left everything to his three children from his previous marriage, with nothing left to Fleming.

Fleming sued the estate for Beevers' half share in the house, as well as for a piano that he had promised to leave her.

== Held ==
The court awarded Fleming the share in the house, but not the piano.

== See also ==
- Part performance in New Zealand law
