= Trespass to land =

Use of land prevented by local property laws

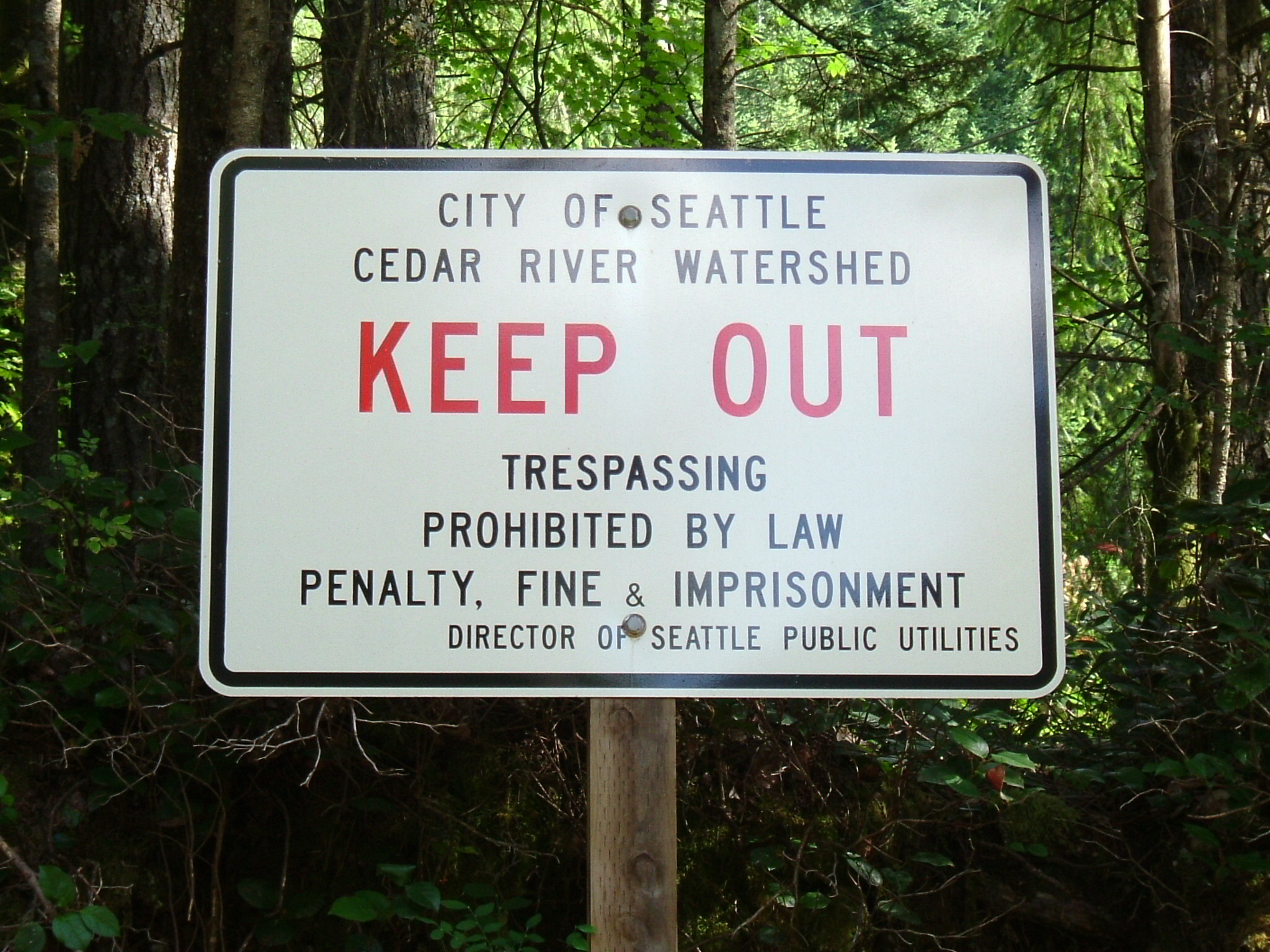
A sign in Seattle, warning that trespassing beyond it is prohibited by law

Trespass to land is the unauthorised entry onto, remaining on, or interference with land in another person's possession. In common-law jurisdictions it may give rise to civil liability as a tort, while legislation may also make certain forms of trespass a crime. Civil trespass is concerned with possession of land and can extend beyond its surface to the subsoil and airspace. Remedies may include damages and an injunction.

The law varies by jurisdiction. In England and Wales, trespass to land is actionable per se, so a claimant does not need to prove actual damage. Ireland criminalises certain forms of trespass that cause or are likely to cause fear, while New Zealand law allows an occupier to warn a person to leave or stay off property and makes subsequent trespass a criminal offence. In Scotland, statutory access rights apply to most land and inland water but are subject to specified exceptions. In the United States, criminal trespass varies by state, but is generally defined by statute, while the civil tort can, depnding on the state, include intentionally entering or remaining on another person's land or failing to remove something from it when under a duty to do so.

== Ireland ==
Trespass in Republic of Ireland law is similar to trespass in English law. The Criminal Justice (Public Order) Act 1994 made it an offence "for a person, without reasonable excuse, to trespass on any building or the curtilage thereof in such a manner as causes or is likely to cause fear in another person". The Criminal Law (Defence and the Dwelling) Act 2011 allows use of reasonable force against someone entering a dwelling "as a trespasser for the purpose of committing a criminal act".

== New Zealand ==
In New Zealand law, the Trespass Act 1980 provides that the occupier of a property or premises, or their agent, can deliver to an individual a "warning to leave" or "warning to stay off" the place; if the recipient trespasses thereafter, they are guilty of a crime rather than merely liable for a tort. If X delivers such a trespass notice to Y, in New Zealand English one may say that "X trespasses Y".

== United Kingdom ==
In Great Britain, the Firearms Act 1968 makes it an offence for a person, without reasonable excuse, to enter or be on land as a trespasser while carrying a firearm or imitation firearm.

=== England and Wales ===
In English law, trespass to land involves the "unjustifiable interference with land which is in the immediate and exclusive possession of another". Land is defined as the surface, subsoil, airspace and anything permanently attached to the land, such as houses. It is not necessary to prove that harm was suffered to bring a claim, and is instead actionable per se. While most trespasses to land are intentional, it can also be committed negligently. Accidental trespass also incurs liability, with an exception for entering land adjoining a road unintentionally (such as in a car accident). Although previously a pure tort, the Criminal Justice and Public Order Act 1994 created some circumstances in which trespass to land can also be a crime.

=== Scotland ===
Trespass is an offence under Scots Law; however, the legislation was amended under the Land Reform (Scotland) Act 2003 which established universal access rights to most land and inland water. These reforms do not apply (hence trespass remains an offence) to:

- Houses and gardens, and non-residential buildings and associated land;
- Land in which crops are growing;
- Land next to a school and used by the school;
- Sports or playing fields when these are in use and where the exercise of access rights would interfere with such use;
- Land developed and in use for recreation and where the exercise of access rights would interfere with such use;
- Golf courses (although a golf course may be crossed provided no games of golf are interfered with);
- Places like airfields, railways, telecommunication sites, military bases and installations, working quarries and construction sites; and
- Visitor attractions or other places which charge for entry.

== United States ==
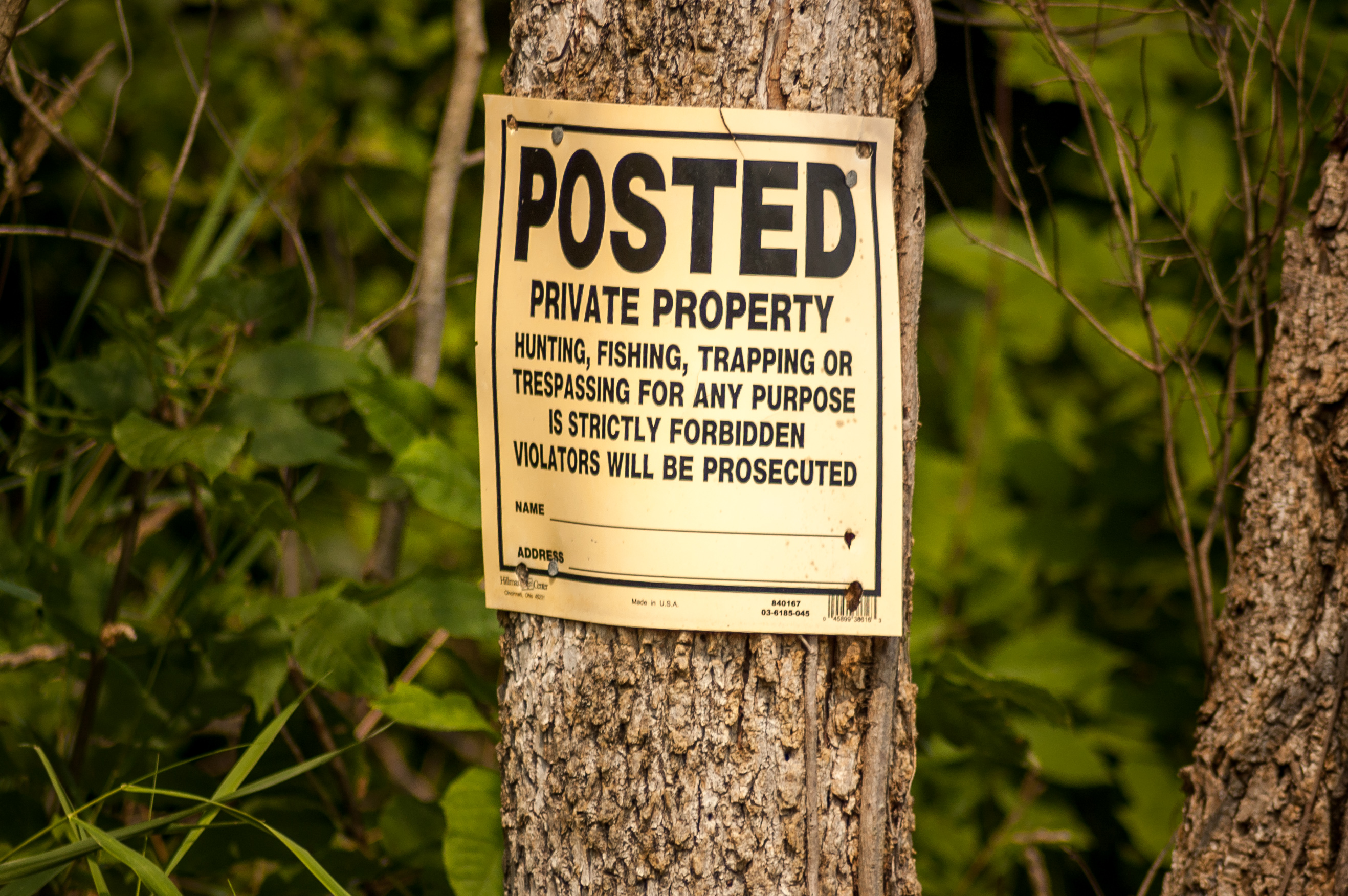
Posted sign in the United States, prohibiting any form of trespass be it for hunting, fishing, trapping or any other purpose

=== Criminal trespass ===
In most states, a criminal trespass to land is defined by statute and is a misdemeanor. In some states, it may be a felony under certain circumstances (e.g., trespassing on a research facility or school property). The federal criminal trespass statute primarily prohibits knowingly entering or remaining in any restricted federal building or grounds without lawful authority to do so.

=== Tortious trespass ===
When referring to the tort of trespass to land, though the exact elements vary by state, under the Restatement (Second) of Torts, a trespass to land is committed when, irrespective of whether a person causes harm to any legally protected interest of the other, that person intentionally:

1. enters land in the possession of the other, or causes a thing or a third person to do so;
2. remains on the land; or
3. fails to remove from the land a thing which he is under a duty to remove.

Trespass may be committed on the surface or subsurface of land, or even the space above land, but flight by aircraft in legally navigable airspace which does not unreasonably interfere with the possessor's use and enjoyment of the land is not trespass. A trespass is also committed when a person initially has permission to place an item of personal property on the land of another, but subsequently fails to remove the property once that permission is revoked. A person who intentionally enters land is not relieved from liability for trespass even if the person mistakenly believes they have the right to enter someone else's property or that the property is theirs.

Remedies for the tort include compensatory damages, punitive damages, and injunctions for continuing trespass.

== See also ==
- Intrusion
- Invasion
- Trespass
- Right of way
- Adverse possession
- Public nuisance
- Freedom to roam
