= Horsburgh v NZ Meat Processors Industrial Union of Workers =

Legal case in New Zealand

- Court: Court of Appeal of New Zealand
- Full case name: Joseph Robert John Horsburgh v NZ Meat Processors, Packers, Preservers, Freezing Works and Related Trades Industrial Union of Workers
- Decided: 21 June 1988
- Citation: CA102/86 [1988] NZCA 75; [1988] 1 NZLR 698; (1988) 2 NZELC 96,397; (1988) ERNZ Sel Cas 193 (21 June 1988)
- Transcript: copy of judgment

Court membership
- Judges sitting: Cooke P, Somers J, Hardie Boys J

Horsburgh v NZ Meat Processors Industrial Union of Workers CA102/86 [1988] NZCA 75; [1988] 1 NZLR 698; (1988) 2 NZELC 96,397; (1988) ERNZ Sel Cas 193 is a cited case in New Zealand law allowing (albeit through the backdoor) compensation for non financial loss, for example for distress. It effectively overruled Addis v Gramophone Co Ltd [1909] AC 488 in NZ case law.

== Background ==
Horsburgh was a member of the local meat workers union. In order to support its striking members at a nearby plant, the union required all its members to contribute to a $10 a week strike fund. Horsburgh refused to make these payments, resulting in his expulsion from the union, and due to compulsory unionism at the time, he then lost his job. It was later discovered that the strike levy was illegal to collect, due to it not being first subject to a secret ballot.

He sued the union for loss of income, as well as for the distress for losing his job.

== Held ==
The court of appeal awarded him $8,000 for the distress of losing his job. This was on the basis that this case involved not an employment issue, but for wrongly being expelled from the union, a tenuous basis, considering the loss of his union membership did result in him losing his job.
