= Francis Cooke (judge) =

New Zealand lawyer and judge (born 1965)

The Honourable Francis Cooke KC

Justice of the Supreme Court of New Zealand
- Incumbent
- Assumed office 9 February 2026

Justice of the Court of Appeal of New Zealand
- In office 19 March 2024 – 8 February 2026

Justice of the High Court
- In office 24 April 2018 – 18 March 2024

Personal details
- Born: 1965 (age 60–61)
- Parent: Lord Cooke of Thorndon (father)
- Education: Victoria University of Wellington; University of Cambridge

Francis Morland Robin Cooke, KC (born 1965) is a New Zealand lawyer and judge.

He has been a judge of the Supreme Court since 2026, having been a judge of the High Court from 2018 to 2024, and a judge of the Court of Appeal from March 2024 to February 2026.

Cooke graduated with an LLB (Hons) from Victoria University of Wellington in 1989 and an LLM from the University of Cambridge in 1990.

He is the son of the former Law Lord and President of the Court of Appeals Lord Cooke of Thorndon ONZ KBE PC QC. His grandfather Philip Cooke MC QC, was also a judge of what was then the Supreme Court, now the High Court of New Zealand.
