= Frank Cooke (barrister) =

New Zealand cricketer and lawyer (1862–1933)

Personal information
- Full name: Frank Herbert Cooke
- Born: 22 September 1862; Northcote, Victoria, Australia
- Died: 10 June 1933 (aged 70); Palmerston North, New Zealand
- Bowling: Slow left-arm orthodox
- Relatives: Philip Cooke (son); Robin Cooke (grandson)

Domestic team information
- Years: Team
- 1879/80–1884/85: Otago
- 1885/86–1888/89: Nelson

Career statistics
Competition	First-class
Matches	11
Runs scored	106
Batting average	6.23
100s/50s	0/0
Top score	34
Balls bowled	2,240
Wickets	83
Bowling average	9.43
5 wickets in innings	7
10 wickets in match	3
Best bowling	9/73
Catches/stumpings	8/–
- Source: CricketArchive, 1 January 2016

Frank Herbert Cooke (22 September 1862 – 10 June 1933) was a New Zealand cricketer who played first-class cricket for Otago and Nelson in the 1880s. He became a barrister and held the office of crown solicitor in Palmerston North.

== Early life and career ==
Cooke was born in Melbourne, Australia, but educated at Tonbridge School in Kent, England. He went to New Zealand in 1879, where he was articled in the law firm of Stewart and Denniston in Dunedin. He was admitted as a barrister in 1884.

== Cricket career ==
A slow left-arm spinner who usually opened the bowling, Cooke began playing for Otago soon after he arrived in Dunedin, appearing in the annual match against Canterbury in January 1880 at the age of 17. In the match against Canterbury in 1882–83 he "completely fogged the majority of the batsmen", taking 15 wickets (8 for 61 and 7 for 33), but Canterbury still won by four runs. In his three first-class matches in 1883–84, two against the touring Tasmanian team and one against Canterbury, he took 29 wickets at an average of 9.41.

In the match against Canterbury in 1884–85 Cooke took the first nine wickets in Canterbury's first innings; the last batsman was run out, and he finished with 9 for 73. It was Cooke's last match for Otago, as he moved to Nelson a few days later.

In Cooke's first match for Nelson, against Wellington in 1885–86, he bowled unchanged through both innings, taking six wickets as Nelson dismissed Wellington for 36 and 19 and won by an innings. In Nelson's next match, in 1886–87, he took 5 for 27 and 4 for 50 and made his highest first-class score of 34, but this time Wellington won. In 1887–88 he took six wickets when Nelson beat Wellington by nine wickets in a single day, a rare occurrence in a first-class match. In a one-day game played on what would have been the second day of that match, he took 8 for 26 and 2 for 17. In the two matches in two days he took 16 wickets for 74.

When the cricket historian Tom Reese compiled his history of early New Zealand cricket, New Zealand Cricket, 1841–1914, in 1927, he selected a 14-man team of the best New Zealand cricketers of the period from 1860 to 1914. Cooke was one of those selected.

== Later life and career ==
Cooke began his own law practice in Nelson at the start of 1885. He was one of the founders of the Nelson Athletic Ground Company, which was formed in 1885 to construct the sporting complex at Trafalgar Park in Nelson. In 1890 he moved to Palmerston North, where he joined a law firm. He was one of the group that acquired the land and developed Palmerston North's major cricket ground, now known as Fitzherbert Park. He was appointed Crown Solicitor at Palmerston North in April 1923.

He married Alice Monckton, of Feilding, in Feilding in February 1892. They had two sons, both of whom pursued careers in the law. Their son Philip (1893–1956) became a judge. Frank Cooke died at his home in Palmerston North in June 1933, aged 70.
