= T A Dellaca v PDL Industries Ltd =

Cited case in New Zealand law

T A Dellaca Ltd v PDL Industries Ltd
- Court: High Court of New Zealand
- Full case name: T A Dellaca Ltd v PDL Industries Ltd
- Decided: 20 November 1991
- Citation: [1992] 3 NZLR 88

Court membership
- Judge sitting: Tipping J

T A Dellaca Ltd v PDL Industries Ltd [1992] 3 NZLR 88 is a cited case in New Zealand law regarding the requirement of some form of signature on a document required under the Contracts Enforcement Act 1956.

== See also ==
- Part performance in New Zealand law
