= Pat Downey (barrister) =

New Zealand barrister and solicitor (1927–2017)

Patrick James Downey OBE (1 May 1927 – 23 January 2017) was a New Zealand barrister and solicitor. He served as the Chief Human Rights Commissioner, and was chairman of the Human Rights Commission from 1978 to 1984. He was director of legal publishers Butterworths of New Zealand between 1983 and 1993, editor of the New Zealand Law Journal from 1983 to 1996, and general editor of The Laws of New Zealand from 1991 to 1995.

== Early life and education ==
Downey was born in Timaru and spent his childhood in Auckland. He was a first-day pupil at St Peter's College, before completing his secondary education at Sacred Heart College in Ponsonby. He graduated Master of Arts with second-class honours from Auckland University College in 1950, and Bachelor of Laws from Victoria University College in 1959.

In 1968, Downey married Krystyna Danuta Kolodynska.

== Career ==
Downey was a practising lawyer with many other interests. At various times he was a university tutor and a civil servant. He was appointed as Chief Human Rights Commissioner in 1977 on the coming into effect of the New Zealand Human Rights Commission Act 1977. As the Chief Commissioner, Downey was influential in preventing 'sexual orientation' from being added under the non-discrimination grounds of the 1977 Act, rejecting persistent campaigning from the National Gay Rights Coalition and other supportive groups.

He was also involved with New Zealand broadcasting, being appointed to the board of the New Zealand Broadcasting Corporation in 1973. He was subsequently chairman of Radio New Zealand and a member of the Broadcasting Council. He was for a time chairman of the committee responsible to the corporation for the New Zealand Symphony Orchestra. Subsequently he was on the boards of the Royal New Zealand Ballet and the New Zealand School of Dance. He was also a contributor to and reviewer for the New Zealand Listener and Landfall. He was editor of the New Zealand Law Journal for 13 years until 1996. During much of this time he was also legal publishing director of Butterworths until retiring from that position in 1992 by which time he was engaged as the founding general editor of The Laws of New Zealand.

Downey died in Wellington on 23 January 2017.

== Honours and awards ==
In 1977, Downey was awarded the Queen Elizabeth II Silver Jubilee Medal. In the 1991 New Year Honours, he was appointed an Officer of the Order of the British Empire, for services to the community.
