= Huntley School, New Zealand =

Huntley School

Location
- Wanganui Road, Marton, New Zealand; 40.0647°S 175.3611°E

Information
- Type: Independent Preparatory, with Boarding (Years 1–8)
- Motto: Honos Per Ardua - Honour through hard work
- Established: 1896
- Ministry of Education Institution no.: 4111
- Headmaster: Sam Edwards
- Enrolment: 164 July 2026
- Website: www.huntley.school.nz

Huntley School is an Anglican independent boarding preparatory school in Marton, New Zealand. It is the oldest preparatory school in the country. As of 2014 it is currently co-educational, after being a boys-only school for 117 years.

It was founded in 1896 by Charles Mather and Basil Wilson on Calico Line as a small school for children of the farmers in Marton. The school is now located on Wanganui Road. The school moved in 1900. The building has been rebuilt since the move. A nail from the original building is kept ceremonially by the headmaster.

The school grounds are 10 hectares, including several sports fields, a chapel (which celebrated its Centennial in 2009), and a gymnasium.

Huntley's roll generally has around 150 students in 5 squads, which are named after the previous headmasters- Mather, Wilson, Rix-Trott, Strombom and Sherriff. They compete in various challenges such as swimming, sports and cross country running. About 100 are full-time boarders (3 week intervals between exeats), while the remaining 50 are day students. A school meal for lunch is provided for all students every day.

The school participates academically in ICAS examinations, Otago Problem Solving and Mathex (a regional mathematics competition). Culturally, the Huntley Jazz Band often competes locally and there are also annual public speaking and debating competitions. Every student is expected to do a sport and the school competes in sporting fixtures with other independent schools such as Lindisfarne preparatory. Some students are national representatives or champions in their sport.

In the spiritual aspect, the Chapel of St. Barnabas had its centennial in 2009. There is a service in the chapel every Monday, Thursday and Friday morning, and Sunday evening. Social opportunities are also found, as there is a social with Carncot in Term 2 and Term 4.

== Headmasters ==
From 1896 to 1954, the successive headmasters owned the school. In 1954, a Trust Board was established to purchase and run the school.

- 1896-1902 Basil Holt Wilson (jointly with Mather)
- 1896-1919 Charles Percival Mather(jointly with Wilson to 1902)
- 1919-1930 Frederick Duncombe Strombom
- 1930-1952 Royes Page Sherriff
- 1953-1969 Noel Vincent Rix-Trott
- 1970-1987 Bret M. Butler (then became headmaster of King's School, Auckland 1988-2000)
- 1988-2000 James H. Allan
- 2000-2004 Greg Thomson
- 2004-2014 Bradden Gay
- 2015- Sam Edwards

== Notable students ==
- Philip Cooke (1893–1956), judge
- Tama Potaka (born 1976), member of parliament
- Sam Strahan (born 1944), All Black 1967-1973 (number 657)
