= Taylor v New Zealand Poultry Board =

- Court: Court of Appeal of New Zealand
- Decided: 18 April 1984
- Citation: [1984] 1 NZLR 394

Court membership
- Judges sitting: Cooke, McMullin and Somers JJ

Keywords
- Judicial Review, Self-incrimination, Parliamentary sovereignty, Right to silence, Eggs

Taylor v New Zealand Poultry Board was a decision of the Court of Appeal of New Zealand concerning the right to silence and implied statutory repeal of the common law privilege against self-incrimination. The decision, about "constitutional principles as well as eggs", is important because of an obiter dictum by New Zealand's pre-eminent judge, Justice Cooke, later Lord Cooke, on the relationship between the judiciary and Parliament. Cooke forcefully states that there may be some parts of the common law so fundamental that courts will not enforce laws of Parliament that seek to abrogate them.

== Background ==
Mr Taylor was a poultry farmer from Greytown who went into the Wellington area in a van to deliver eggs. At the time the poultry market was heavily regulated; farmers were required to sell eggs in certain areas through the Poultry Board and the regulations were policed by the Board's agents.

On three occasions, Mr Taylor was stopped and questioned by the New Zealand Poultry Board's Wellington manager, who in the District Court, testified that Mr Taylor's vehicle contained thousands of eggs. The Poultry Board's manager asked Taylor where the eggs were produced and to whom they belonged. Taylor's replies to these questions were described in Court as "evasive" and "childish", "such as pretending that the eggs were potatoes".

Regulation 57, subclause (3) allowed for agents of the Poultry Board to require people with eggs and poultry in their possession and intended for sale to, "answer any inquiries relative to the source of production of the eggs or poultry, or their ownership or their intended destination". Subclause (4) of Regulation 57 made it an offence if a person "refuses or fails to answer any inquiries put to him in accordance with this regulation, or who gives any false or misleading information in relation thereto". These regulations had been made by the Governor-General by Order in Council, under section 24(1) of the Poultry Board Act 1980, which allowed for: regulations requiring the provision of information to the board; and the creation of offences aimed at those failing to comply with the Act or regulations made under it.

Taylor was convicted in the District Court on three charges of having "failed to answer inquiries relative to the source of production and ownership (in one information production only) of eggs in his possession which were intended for sale, such inquiries being put to him in accordance with reg 57 by an officer of the New Zealand Poultry Board". Taylor was fined a total of $700.

Taylor appealed his convictions unsuccessfully in the High Court. Justice Cooke summarised that Justice Jeffries in the High Court had declined the appeal because, "The Act and the regulations place the Board at the centre of a system designed, as the Judge put it, to replace a free market with extensive, but not complete, control over production, marketing and disposal of surplus. He thought that the intention of the legislature should not be frustrated for anything but the most compelling reasons in law; and that a reasonable authorisation to question must be part of the policing of the statutory scheme."

Justice Jeffries granted Taylor leave to appeal to the Court of Appeal. The leave to appeal was granted on the following point of law, "Whether the Poultry Board Act 1980 authorises by sufficiently clear words the creation (contrary to the common law principle that a person cannot be forced to answer questions under threat of sanction) by reg 57 of the Poultry Board Regulations 1980 of an offence of refusing or failing to answer inquiries put to a person by the Board, its employees or agents in accordance with the regulation."

== Judgments ==
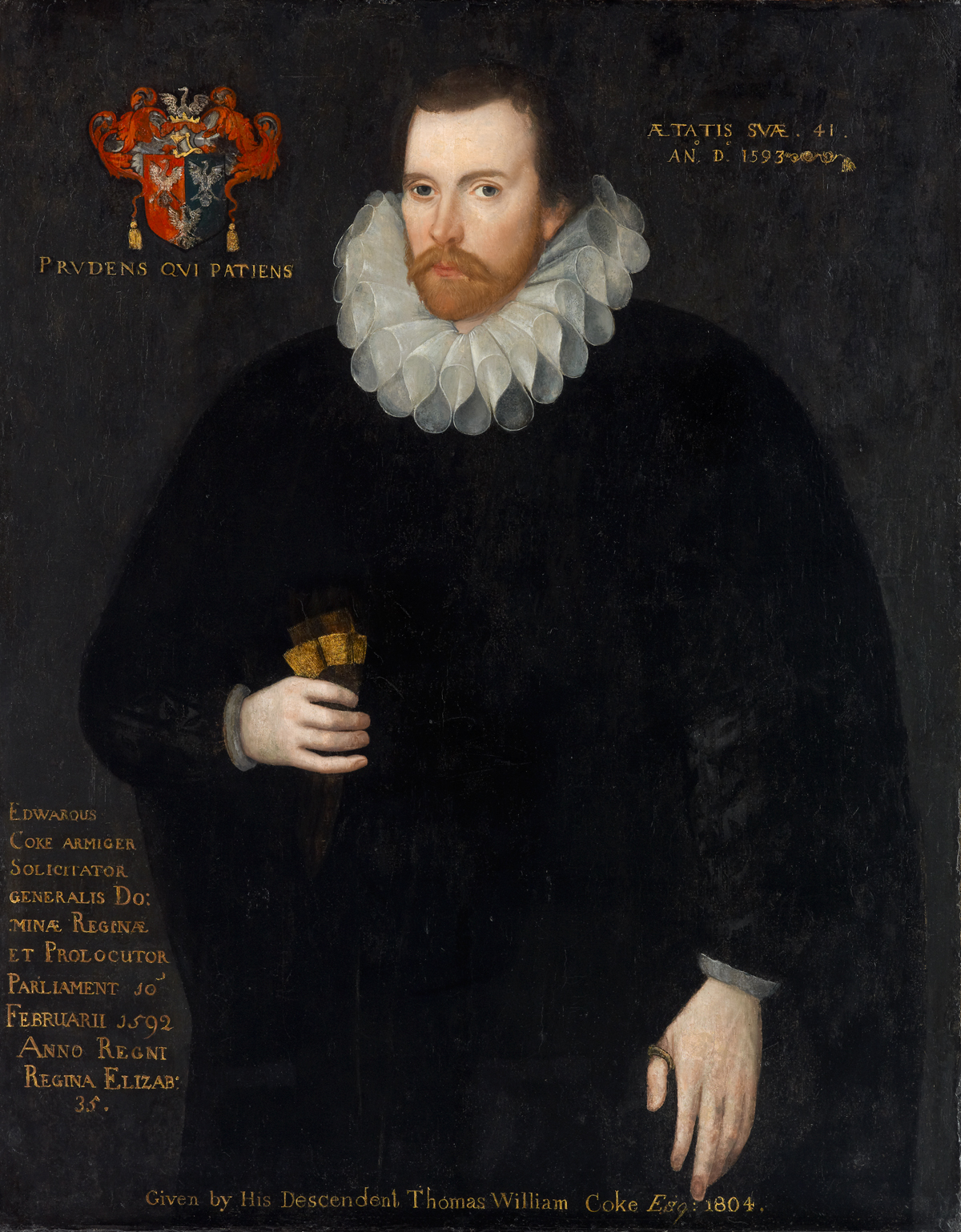
In Bonham's Case, decided in 1610 by the Court of Common Pleas in England, Sir Edward Coke, the court's Chief Justice, said that "in many cases, the common law will control Acts of Parliament".

By a majority, with Justice McMullin dissenting, Taylor's appeal was dismissed and his convictions upheld.

=== Cooke J ===
Justice Cooke noted on the right to silence, "The starting point for any attempt to explore a little deeper must be the principle that, unless an Act of Parliament imposes or authorises the imposition of a duty to the contrary, every citizen has in general a right to refuse to answer questions from anyone, including an official."

Cooke then said, "Nor is it in dispute that, if the meaning of the statutory language is sufficiently clear, the New Zealand Parliament can make a person compellable to answer questions on certain subjects from an official - again in the sense that a refusal to answer may result in penalties." It was at this point, Cooke went on to make one of his most famous judicial comments,

I do not think that literal compulsion, by torture for instance, would be within the lawful powers of Parliament. Some common law rights presumably lie so deep that even Parliament could not override them.

— Cooke J, Taylor v New Zealand Poultry Board

Cooke considers leading common law decisions from the High Court of Australia and the House of Lords on "whether the privilege against self-incrimination applies outside Court proceedings"; and concludes

"I see the principles in this way. I respectfully agree with the majority view now prevailing in Australia that the privilege against self-incrimination is capable of applying outside Court proceedings. The common law favours the liberty of the citizen, and, if a Court is not satisfied that a statutory power of questioning was meant to exclude the privilege, it is in accordance with the spirit of the common law to allow the privilege."

Cooke explicitly and immediately limits these principles:

"But, as to the scope of the privilege, it is necessary to keep a sense of proportion... In the end the true intent of the particular authorising statute must prevail. Only where it is not reasonably discoverable can there be a presumption in favour of the right to silence. Marketing schemes, introduced largely to protect and at the wish of the primary producers, have long been a feature of the New Zealand economy. As Jeffries J said, policing is needed to make them work. Considerable bureaucratic powers are a necessary consequence - however, distasteful to those who in principle would prefer free enterprise."

The Poultry Board Act 1980 is, aimed at industry self-governance by a democratically elected board, and as such Cooke J holds, "it would be quite wrong for this Court to approach the interpretation of the Poultry Board Act with any sense of hostility to the power to ask reasonable questions."

Cooke dismissed Taylor's appeal, "A main purpose of requiring such returns would normally be to ensure that the marketing system was working properly and, if not, to take the necessary action. It would stultify the purpose if a recipient of a requirement could refuse to comply because there was a real risk that a transgression would come to light. In my opinion, reg 57(3) so far as here relevant was within the authority conferred by Parliament and the defendant was rightly held to have committed offences by failing to answer the inquiries."

=== McMullin J ===
Justice McMullin gave a short dissent, based on his view that the Poultry Board Act at no point indicates an intent by Parliament to make such a major alteration to the law:

"While recognising that there are two sides to the argument, I have no confidence that in enacting s 24(1)(n) and (o) Parliament intended to provide the bureaucracy with the power to make punishable with a fine of $2000 the mere failure of a producer or retailer of eggs to supply information as to the source of eggs in his possession. And it is noteworthy that if reg 57(3) is validly made, an inspector could require any person not necessarily connected with the poultry industry to answer any inquiries relative to the source of production, ownership and intended destination of a single fowl. One imagines that he might well ignore the case of the broody hen taken to a friend for hatching purposes. Such considerations bring me to the view that reg 57, in so far as it seeks to impose the obligation which it is claimed it did on the appellant, is ultra vires."

=== Somers J ===
Justice Somers agreed with Cooke J that the appeal should be dismissed:

"the privilege against self-incrimination which is capable of applying to non-judicial proceedings of which this is one has been impliedly excluded by the terms of the regulation. If it were not so the right to inquire and the duty to answer would be largely illusory.... [and] I consider it clear that the purposes of the Board mentioned in para (n) [of s 24(1) of the Poultry Board Act] include securing the observance and the policing of regulations which set out the mode by which its functions are carried out.

== Significance ==
The Taylor decision is specifically important because it is, "the leading case on how to determine whether a particular statutory power implicitly removes or preserves the privilege against [self-incrimination]".

More generally, the case is important because of Cooke's dictum on common law rights. Cooke's dictum in Taylor is the last and strongest of a series of comments he made in judicial decisions invoking inviolable common law rights.

They came at a time in New Zealand history when many people feared that the Third National Government of Robert Muldoon was becoming increasingly authoritarian. The Springbok Tour protests in 1981 and the 1982 bombing of the National Law Enforcement System computer were other examples of liberal reactions to Muldoon's extension of state power. In this context, Cooke's comments were groundbreaking and borderline subversive. Cooke was also challenging long held views that Parliament had unquestionable supreme power to make laws.

Beverley McLachlin, Chief Justice of the Canadian Supreme Court has written about Cooke's dictum,

"In his prescient way, Lord Cooke put his finger on a question that would come to more and more preoccupy the common law world in the years that followed: do judges have the right to invoke fundamental norms to trump written laws? And in his usual forthright way, he staked out his turf on the issue in no uncertain terms. He argued that an independent judiciary is the safeguard of parliamentary democracy, and urged courts not to be afraid to assume their role in protecting certain fundamental principles as essential to the rule of law and the expression of democratic will, even if these “deep rights” were not in written form."

Former Australian High Court Justice Michael Kirby has noted that Cooke's comments reinvigorated the natural law theory that holds certain human rights to be fundamental and inalienable. Kirby has criticised Cooke's comments because, "By challenging the power of Parliament with notions of "deep rights" the judge challenges the democratic character of the system of which the judiciary is part and which sustains the judiciary's own legitimacy." Kirby, was one of the judges in the New South Wales Court of Appeal in 1986 who rejected an argument by the Builders' Labourers Federation relying on Cooke's dictum, that a law deregistering the union and infringing on judicial power, should not be followed as it abrogated the common law right of access to justice.
