= Flickinger v Crown Colony of Hong Kong =

- Court: Court of Appeal of New Zealand
- Decided: 16 November 1990
- Citation: [1991] 1 NZLR 439

Case history
- Prior action: High Court [1990] 3 NZLR 372

Court membership
- Judges sitting: Cooke P, Richardson, Casey, Bisson and Jeffries JJ

Keywords
- Habeas corpus, New Zealand Bill of Rights Act 1990

Flickinger v Crown Colony of Hong Kong was the first Bill of Rights case to reach the Court of Appeal. It concerned whether detained persons should be granted the right to appeal unsuccessful applications for Habeas corpus and how statutes should be interpreted in light of the Bill of Rights Act 1990.

== Background ==
Robert Lee Flickinger was an American fraudster on the run from Hong Kong authorities after being charged with 37 counts related to commercial fraud. Flickinger had been imprisoned in Mount Eden Prison to await rendition to Hong Kong to stand trial following an eight-week hearing in the District Court. Flickinger subsequently sought an order under the Fugitive Offenders Act 1881 (UK) that the court discharge him and also a writ of habeas corpus in the High Court. The High Court declined these applications in October 1990. Flickinger appealed the High Court's decision to the Court of Appeal.

The legal problem facing the Court of Appeal was as President Cooke noted,

Before the coming into force of the New Zealand Bill of Rights Act 1990 it had been held in a long line of cases in this country, culminating in R v Clarke [1985] 2 NZLR 212, that s 66 of the Judicature Act 1908 did not confer a right of appeal in criminal matters. Considered alone the words of that section would be apt to do so, but their statutory context and history led to a different conclusion, as explained in Clarke. It has been established since Ex parte Bouvy (No 3) (1900) 18 NZLR 608 that a habeas corpus application or an application to prevent extradition in respect of pending criminal proceedings is a criminal matter.

However as Cooke noted, s 6 of the Bill of Rights Act required courts to interpret legislation to have meanings consistent with the rights and freedoms contained in the Bill of Rights and s 23(1)(c) of BoRA provided that everyone arrested or detained, "shall have the right to have the validity of the arrest or detention determined without delay by way of habeas corpus and to be released if the arrest or detention is not lawful".

== Judgment ==
President Cooke gave the judgment of the Court, noting,

[W]e see force in the argument that, to give full measure to the rights specified in s 23(1)(c), s 66 of the Judicature Act should now receive a wider interpretation than has prevailed hitherto. That may be supported by noting that, in democracies other than New Zealand, rights of appeal in habeas corpus and extradition and rendition matters appear to be conferred. Certainly the Court has been referred to no democratic country in which they do not exist.

But we need not decide the point and refrain from doing so, as an urgent decision of this case is necessary. An urgent fixture was granted at the instance of the applicant for habeas corpus; and we deal with the case in the spirit of the Bill of Rights and habeas corpus law, both of which protect the liberty of persons unless lawfully restrained.

Assuming without deciding that the right of appeal conferred by s 66 of the Judicature Act should now be treated as embracing habeas corpus and the like in criminal matters, we are satisfied that there are no grounds for disturbing the judgment of Thorp J, following as it did the no less careful and thorough judgment of Morris DCJ.

Michael Taggart, in an influential article on the operation of the Bill of Rights Act, reasoned that the judgment, by inferring that BoRA allows appeals on habeas corpus applications when s 23(1)(c) of BoRA only calls for a right to challenge a detention, was so generous, "the right's cup runneth over".

== Habeas Corpus Act 2001 ==
Section 16 of the Habeas Corpus Act 2001 now provides for rights of appeal in habeas corpus applications. Thus as the Court of Appeal observed in 2003, "Since the enactment of the New Zealand Bill of Rights Act 1990 with its guarantee of the availability of habeas corpus, the question has arisen whether appeal rights in habeas corpus cases might now be seen differently... That question is now hypothetical since the legislature had answered it by conferring rights of appeal."
