= Taupo Borough Council v Birnie =

- Court: Court of Appeal of New Zealand
- Full case name: Taupo Borough Council v J W Birnie Limited, T.A. Heath Limited, and James Watson Birnie and Eunice Mabel Birnie
- Decided: 23 September 1977
- Citation: [1978] 2 NZLR 397
- Transcript: Court of Appeal judgment

Court membership
- Judges sitting: Richmond P, Woodhouse J, Cooke J

Keywords
- negligence

Taupo Borough Council v Birnie [1978] 2 NZLR 397 is a cited case in New Zealand regarding liability for loss of profits due to negligence.

== Background ==
The Birnies owned a motel in Taupō. As a result of repeated floodings at the motel, there was a substantial loss of income, which ultimately led to the motel later being sold at a mortgagee sale.

The flooding was the result of works by the local council, which resulted in the culverts not being able to handle the water, causing the flooding at the motel.

== Held ==
The Court awarded damages against the council.
