= Part performance in New Zealand law =

Part performance is an equitable doctrine in New Zealand law.

Cases relevant to this doctrine include:

- Young v Anderson and Others; Anderson and Others v Young and Others
- Boviard v Brown
- Boutique Balmoral Ltd v Retail Holdings Ltd
- Ward v Metcalfe
- T A Dellaca Ltd v PDL Industries Ltd
- Fleming v Beevers
- Mahoe Buildings Ltd v Fair Investments Ltd

== Mahoe Buildings Ltd v Fair Investments Ltd ==
Mahoe Buildings Ltd v Fair Investments Ltd
- Court: Court of Appeal of New Zealand
- Full case name: Mahoe Buildings Ltd v Fair Investments Ltd
- Decided: 20 July 1993
- Citation: [1994] 1 NZLR 281

Court membership
- Judges sitting: Richardson J, Hardie Boys J, Robertson J

Mahoe Buildings Ltd v Fair Investments Ltd [1994] 1 NZLR 281 is a cited case in New Zealand regarding the doctrine of part performance.

Mahoe leased a building from Fair Investments. At the end of the four-year lease, both parties agreed orally to renew the lease. However, as such leases to be legally enforceable under the Contracts Enforcement Act 1956, they must be in writing, and not merely agreed orally. Later, one of the parties tried to get out of the lease, on the basis that it was not legally enforceable as the lease renewal was not put in writing. The other party claimed, that even though it was not put in writing, the lease was still legally enforceable due to the doctrine of part performance.

The court ruled that the doctrine of part performance applied here, making the renewal of the lease legally enforceable.
