= Law of New Zealand =

The law of New Zealand uses the English common law system, inherited from being a part of the British Empire.

There are several sources of law, the primary ones being acts enacted by the New Zealand Parliament and case law made by decisions of the courts of New Zealand. At a more fundamental level, the law of New Zealand is based on three related principles: parliamentary sovereignty; the rule of law; and the separation of powers.

== History ==
=== Pre-European law ===
Before colonisation by the British, Māori customary law (tikanga) would have served as rule of law for most tribes.

The first mention of New Zealand in British statutes is in the Murders Abroad Act 1817, which clarified that New Zealand was not a British colony (despite being claimed by Captain Cook) and "not within His Majesty's dominions".

=== Treaty of Waitangi ===
The Treaty of Waitangi was signed in 1840. Although the treaty had never been incorporated into New Zealand municipal law, its provisions were first incorporated into legislation as early as the Land Claims Ordinance 1841 and the Native Rights Act 1865. However, in the 1877 Wi Parata v Bishop of Wellington judgment, Judge Prendergast argued that the treaty was a "simple nullity" in terms of transferring sovereignty from Māori to the United Kingdom. This remained the legal orthodoxy until at least the 1970s. Māori have since argued that Prendergast's decision and laws later based on it were a politically convenient and deliberate ploy to legitimise the seizure of Māori land and other resources.

The Treaty of Waitangi Act 1975 established the Waitangi Tribunal, which had authority to investigate post-1975 Māori claims of actions that are inconsistent with the principles of the Treaty of Waitangi, to make findings of fact, and to make non-binding recommendations. The act was amended in 1985 to enable the tribunal to consider claims back to 1840.

The treaty was incorporated in a limited way into New Zealand law by the State Owned Enterprises Act 1986. Section 9 of the act states "Nothing in this Act shall permit the Crown to act in a manner that is inconsistent with the Principles of the Treaty of Waitangi". The government had proposed a transfer of assets from former Government departments to state-owned enterprises, but because the state-owned enterprises were essentially private firms owned by the government, there was an argument that they would prevent assets that had been given by Māori for use by the state from being returned to Māori by the Waitangi Tribunal and through treaty settlements. The act was challenged in court in 1987, and the judgement of New Zealand Maori Council v Attorney-General defined the principles of the Treaty of Waitangi in the context of that case and the proposed sale of government assets was found to be in breach of this proviso. This allowed the courts to consider the Crown's actions in terms of consistence with the treaty and established the principle that if the Treaty is mentioned in strong terms in a piece of legislation it takes precedence over other parts of that legislation, should they come into conflict. The "principles of the treaty" became a common topic in contemporary New Zealand politics, and in 1989 the Fourth Labour Government responded by adopting the Principles for Crown Action on the Treaty of Waitangi, a list of principles similar to that established in the 1987 court case.

=== Court system ===
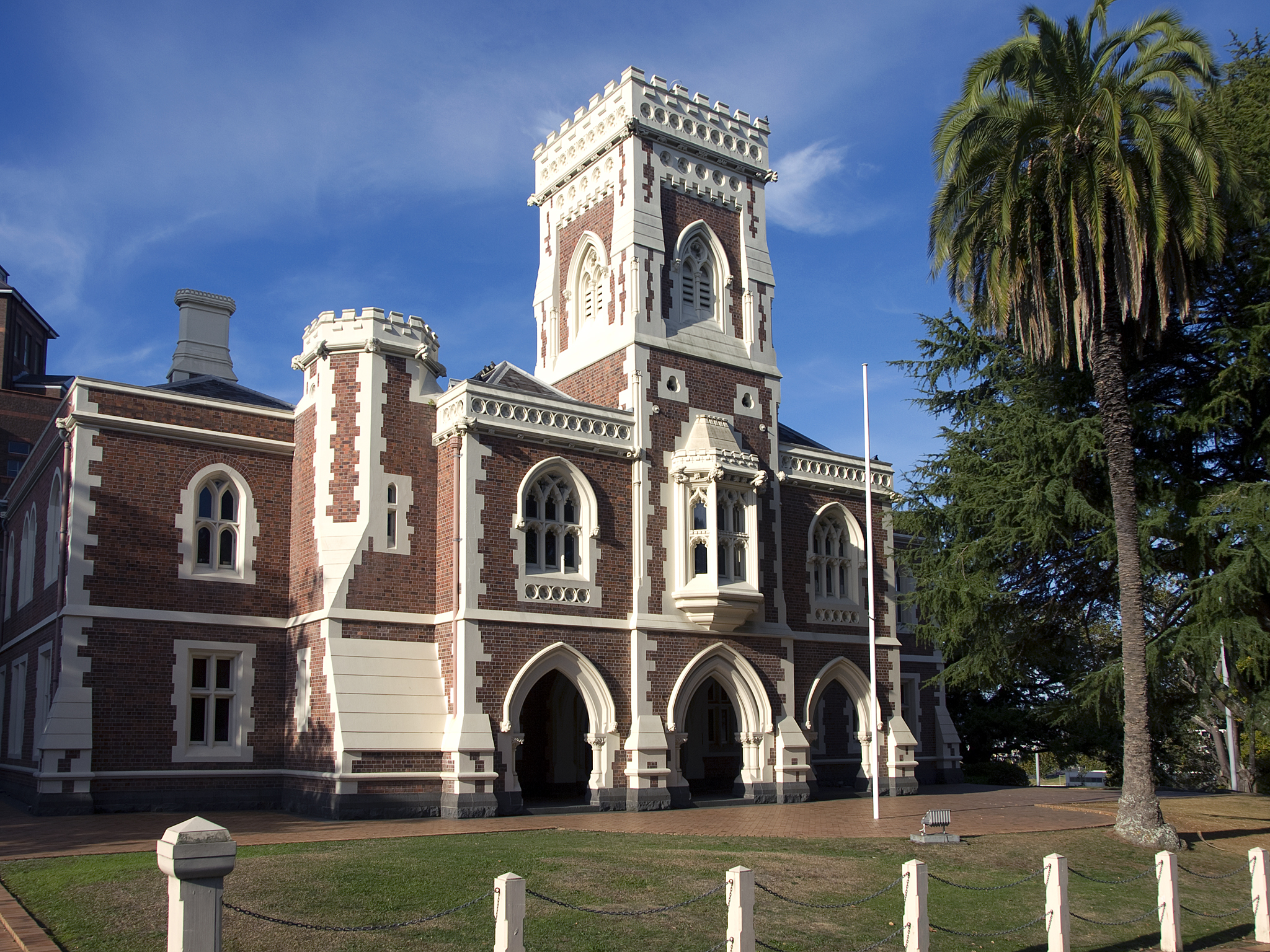
Auckland High Court, built in 1865–1868 for the Supreme Court in New Zealand

A Supreme Court was first established in 1841 (it was renamed the High Court in 1980, and is different from the current Supreme Court), and various lower courts subsequently established. Its establishment followed the arrival in New Zealand of the first chief justice, William Martin, and it heard its first case in January 1842. The magistrates' courts came into being in 1846 (replaced by district courts in 1980). The Court of Appeal was set up in 1862 and originally consisted of panels of judges from the Supreme Court. The Court of Appeal was the highest court in New Zealand, although appeals could be taken from this to the Judicial Committee of the Privy Council in London. In 1957 the Court of Appeal was reconstituted to become separate from the Supreme Court, having its own judges. In 2004 a new Supreme Court was established, becoming New Zealand's court of last resort following the simultaneous abolition of the right to appeal to the Privy Council.

In 1865 a Native Land Court was established to "define the land rights of Māori people under Māori custom and to translate those rights or customary titles into land titles recognisable under European law". It has since been heavily criticised for acting as a device for removing Māori from their land. Some of the problems were with the court itself – holding proceedings in English and in cities far from Māori settlements, judges with inadequate knowledge of Māori custom – while others were more to do with the laws it enforced. For example, for many decades land law did not recognise that an entire hapū owned its land, and land ownership was put in the hands of a few people. In 1954 it was renamed the Māori Land Court, and has been substantially reformed since the nineteenth century. Until the mid-twentieth century it also dealt with Māori adoptions.

The New Zealand judiciary have generally been seen as independent and non-corrupt, although not always non-biased. Until recent years they have played a very minor role in developing the law, and as late as 1966 it was said that they "usually follow English decisions scrupulously". In the 1980s the judiciary played a major role in redefining the constitutional position of the Treaty of Waitangi.

=== New Zealand Bill of Rights Act ===
The New Zealand Bill of Rights Act was enacted in 1990 to affirm fundamental rights and freedoms set out in the International Covenant on Civil and Political Rights. While the Bill of Rights Act is not a superior law to which all other laws are subject, judges are required to interpret other statutes to be consistent with it if at all possible. If there is an inconsistency, the attorney-general must inform Parliament.

== Legal tradition ==
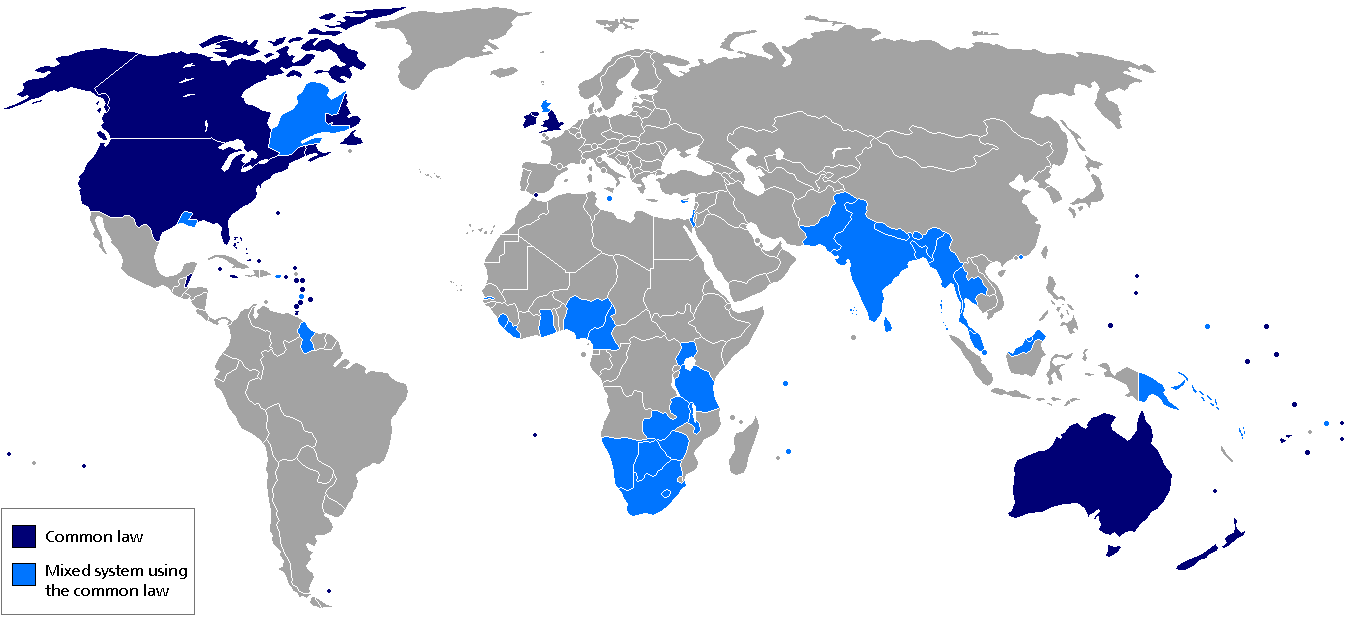
Common law legal systems

The New Zealand legal system is heavily based on the English law, and remains similar in many respects. As with all common law countries, English law is organised around the doctrines of precedent (like cases should be decided alike) and stare decisis. These principles dictate that lower courts must follow the decisions of the more senior courts in the judicial hierarchy. This encourages consistency of decision-making.

== Contract law ==
New Zealand contract law was initially derived from the English model. Since 1969, however, a series of Acts of Parliament, the "Contract Statutes", has altered this, and New Zealand contract law is now "largely ... distinct from other jurisdictions". The main distinction of New Zealand contract law is the wide discretionary power given to courts in granting relief. Although these changes were initially opposed due to fears that they would make the remediation of contractual disputes unpredictable and increase levels of litigation, it is generally agreed that this has not happened, and that the laws are working satisfactorily.

== Trusts ==
The Trusts Act 2019 (No 38) came into force on 30 January 2021, so far as it was not already in force. It repealed the Trustee Act 1956 (No 61).

As to charitable trusts, see the Charitable Trusts Act 1957.

== See also ==
- Constitution of New Zealand
- The Laws of New Zealand, an encyclopaedia of law
- List of national legal systems
