= Fusion of powers =

Feature of some forms of government

Fusion of powers is a feature of some forms of government, where some branches of government are integrated or in a hierarchical relationship, instead of separated. In particular, the term is used to describe the relationship of the legislative and executive branches in parliamentary system, especially the Westminster system.

In the Westminster system, members of the executive must also come from the legislature, meaning fusion is not only found in the institutional relationships, but also personal overlap. The system first arose as a result of political evolution in the United Kingdom over many centuries, as the powers of the monarch became constrained by Parliament, removing the separation of powers between the two branches. By the time Bagehot coined the term, fusion of the political branches was near complete, which he described as the "efficient secret" of the Westminster model. Fusion of powers also used to be present between the judiciary and the legislature (with parliamentary supremacy), as the House of Lords acted as final court of appeal, until the establishment of the Supreme Court.

Fusion of legislative and executive branches exists in parliamentary democracies by design. For Sartori, "parliamentary systems do not permit a separation of power between parliament and government [executive]", but are based on executive-legislative power sharing. In modern democratic polities the judiciary is not fused with either the legislative, or the executive branch. (Note: However, the independence of a judicial organ is not absolute, nor is there any guarantee that a judicial organ of a state will remain, or has the right to be, independent, as in many states with a sovereign legislature the legislature has the right to alter or abolish any of the judicial organs of that state. See Judicial functions of the House of Lords as an example.)

Fusion is contrasted with the separation of powers found in presidential and assembly independent systems and to some degree in semi-presidential and semi-parliamentary governments.

== Meaning ==
The term fusion of powers itself is believed to have been coined by the British constitutional expert Walter Bagehot. In the English Constitution, he writes:

"The English system, therefore, is not an absorption of the executive power by the legislative power; it is a fusion of the two. Either the Cabinet legislates and acts, or else it can dissolve. It is a creature, but it has the power of destroying its creators. It is an executive which can annihilate the legislature, as well as an executive which is the nominee of the legislature. It was made, but it can unmake; it was derivative in its origin, but it is destructive in its action. This fusion of the legislative and executive functions may, to those who have not much considered it, seem but a dry and small matter to be the latent essence and effectual secret of the English Constitution; but we can only judge of its real importance by looking at a few of its principal effects, and contrasting it very shortly with its great competitor, which seems likely, unless care be taken, to outstrip it in the progress of the world. That competitor is the Presidential system. The characteristic of it is that the President is elected from the people by one process, and the House of Representatives by another. The independence of the legislative and executive powers is the specific quality of Presidential government, just as their fusion and combination is the precise principle of Cabinet government."

By fusion Bagehot identifies the following markers:

- There is a distinction made for executive and legislative power, the parliament does not "absorb" executive power.
- The cabinet (executive) is dependent on the confidence of parliament (legislature), the two may not be in conflict for more than brief transitional periods (responsible government)
- An element of mutual destruction, whereby the executive may dissolve the legislature, but thereby also dissolving it's principal, at which point new elections are held.
- The executive can be considered a (special, most important) committee of the legislature
- The prime minister is de facto leader of the legislature and the cabinet "legislates" indirectly through parliament.
- It's conceptual opposite, with "full separation of powers" is the presidential system, where not only is the executive independent of the assembly, but it has a separate channel of democratic legitimacy (whether direct or indirect election)

Shugart highlights two dimensions of fusion (and separation): origin and survival. Origin described the choosing of the executive and survival is the possibility of removal of the executive. Parliamentary systems are fusion systems on both dimensions, presidential systems on neither, while directly elected prime ministers and assembly independent executives are "pure hybrids". Semi-presidential systems are more complex hybrids, having both elements of fusion and separation. He also notes that an "informal fusion of powers" may arise in separation of powers system as well.

=== Choosing the executive ===
Under fusion of powers systems, the executive is chosen directly or indirectly by the legislature. In negative parliamentary systems (where confidence is assumed or linked to legislation), the executive is either still nominally appointed by the (non-executive) head of state, but by convention or explicit rule has to be one that may bear the confidence of the parliamentary majority. The Westminster system follows the "indirect" rule of negative parliamentarism:

"as a rule, the nominal Prime Minister is chosen by the legislature, and the real Prime Minister for most purposes—the leader of the House of Commons—almost without exception is so. There is nearly always some one man plainly selected by the voice of the predominant party in the predominant house of the legislature to head that party, and consequently to rule the nation."

Under positive parliamentarism (where there is a investiture vote to install the executive), the prime minister or cabinet is confirmed by an explicit vote of confidence in parliament and must have a majority of members in favour.

== Examples for legislature and executive ==
=== Austria ===
Austria has a nominally semi-presidential constitution of the president-parliamentary type, where the president is directly elected has much power de iure, however today, it operates as a de facto parliamentary country where "the separation of powers of Parliament and the Government no longer exists in the classical sense".

=== Canada ===
Canada, like other parliamentary countries using the Westminster system, has a fusion between the executive and the legislative branches, following the principle of responsible government. The Prime Minister and other Cabinet ministers are members of Parliament. Senator Eugene Forsey remarked that "in Canada, the Government and the House of Commons cannot be at odds for more than a few weeks at a time. If they differ on any matter of importance, then, promptly, there is either a new government or a new House of Commons."

However, the two branches have distinct roles, and in certain instances can come into conflict with each other. For example, in June 2021, the Speaker of the House of Commons directed a member of the public service to comply with an order of the House of Commons to share certain documents with the Commons, and the public servant refused to do so. The federal government announced that it would challenge the Speaker's ruling in the Federal Court, but dropped the lawsuit in August when Parliament was dissolved for a federal election.

=== Denmark ===
The Danish government relies on the confidence of the parliament, Folketinget, to stay in power. If there is a successful motion of no confidence against the government, it collapses and either a new government is formed or new elections are called. The executive branch thus relies on the legislative branch, similarly to the Westminster system.

=== India ===
India operates under a parliamentary system derived from the Westminster model, which features a partial fusion of powers between the executive and legislative branches. Under the Constitution of India, the executive branch is drawn directly from the legislature. According to Article 75, the Prime Minister and the Council of Ministers must be members of Parliament (either the Lok Sabha or the Rajya Sabha); if a minister is not a member of Parliament upon appointment, they must be elected to either house within six months.

Despite this executive-legislative fusion, India maintains a strict separation of powers regarding its judiciary. Unlike the parliamentary sovereignty found in the United Kingdom, India follows constitutional supremacy. The Supreme Court of India exercises robust powers of judicial review and has established in landmark rulings, such as Kesavananda Bharati v. State of Kerala, that the separation of powers among the executive, legislature, and judiciary is a fundamental component of the "basic structure" of the Constitution, which cannot be amended or abolished by Parliament.

=== Israel ===
Israel has a Westminster-derived parliamentary system, in which the Government is generally made up of members of the Knesset, Israel's parliament. It is legally possible in Israel to appoint ministers who are not members of Knesset, but that is usually not done. By law, the Prime Minister (and, in an alternation government, also the Alternate Prime Minister) must be members of the Knesset.

=== Netherlands ===
The Netherlands, being a parliamentary system has fusion of powers, however it is not a Westminster type system. There is an element of separation called dualism, whereby ministers may not be members of the legislature.

=== Sweden ===
The parliamentary system in Sweden has since its new constitution in 1974 instituted a fusion of powers whereby the principle of "popular sovereignty" serves as the guiding light of principle of government and forms the first line of the constitution. Although the system is seen as a form of negative parliamentarism, there is a direct investiture vote for the prime minister.

There is a "minor element" of institutional separation in that the Swedish system cabinet ministers cannot act as MPs (dualism).

=== United Kingdom ===
The United Kingdom is generally considered the country with the strongest fusion of powers. Government ministers are even required to be members of parliament under the principle of monism.

Until 2005, the Lord Chancellor was a full fusion of all branches, being speaker in the House of Lords, a government minister heading the Lord Chancellor's Department, and head of the judiciary.

== Hybrids of fusion and separation ==
Some forms of government combine fusion and separation of executive powers in different ways.

In an assembly-independent republic, the executive is elected by the legislature (fusion) but, once in office, is not politically accountable to it and cannot be removed through a vote of no confidence (separation). In comparative politics, this institutional arrangement is commonly described as assembly-independent government, referring to systems that combine legislative election of the executive with its independence from parliamentary dismissal. They may or may not also hold a seat in the legislature.

In a semi-presidential republic a president exists alongside a prime minister and a cabinet, with the latter two being responsible to the legislature (fusion). It differs from a parliamentary system in that it has an executive president independent from the legislature (separation); and from the presidential system in that the cabinet, although named by the president, is responsible to the legislature, which may force the cabinet to resign through a motion of no confidence.

A semi-parliamentary system is a system of government in which the legislature is split into two parts that are both directly elected – the first chamber has the power to select and remove the members of the executive by a vote of no confidence (fusion), while the second chamber does not (separation).

Under dualistic parliamentary forms of government, where the membership of the legislative and executive powers cannot overlap, however, as part of the parliamentary structure, fusion is still the dominant relation between the two branches.

=== Australia ===
Australia has a partially Westminster-derived variation on the parliamentary system in which the executive branch is entirely composed of members of the legislative branch (monism). Government ministers are required to be members of parliament, which is an element of fusion — but the federal judiciary strictly guards its independence from the other two branches. However, the system can be described as semi-parliamentary in that only the House of Representatives has confidence powers (fusion), while the Senate represents an aspect of separation of powers. The system has also been named a "Washminster" variation for this reason.

=== France ===
The current French Fifth Republic provides an example of the fusion of powers from a country that does not follow the Westminster system. Rather France follows a model known alternatively as a semi-presidential system or 'mixed presidential-parliamentary' system, which is a variation on parliamentary democracy and with a significant role played by the president in the executive branch.

=== Japan ===
Under the Constitution of Japan, a majority of cabinet ministers, including the prime minister, must be members of the National Diet. The system can be described as semi-parliamentary in that only the House of Representatives has confidence powers (fusion), while the House of Councillors represents an aspect of separation of powers.

== Criticisms ==
Bagehot praises fusion of powers as the "efficient secret" of the Westminster system:

"The efficient secret of the English Constitution may be described as the close union, the nearly complete fusion, of the executive and legislative powers. No doubt by the traditional theory, as it exists in all the books, the goodness of our constitution consists in the entire separation of the legislative and executive authorities, but in truth its merit consists in their singular approximation. The connecting link is the Cabinet. By that new word we mean a committee of the legislative body selected to be the executive body. The legislature has many committees, but this is its greatest."

Proponents of separation of powers criticise fusion as concentrating too much power in the executive, as through the combination of fusion, one-party majorities and strict party discipline, the executive can too easily force through legislation.

== See also ==
- Parliamentary sovereignty
- Unified state power – similar principle in communist states
- Responsible government
- Constitutionalism
- Constitutional economics
- Mixed government
- Rule according to higher law
- Elective dictatorship
