= Principles of the Treaty of Waitangi =

Aspect of New Zealand law and politics

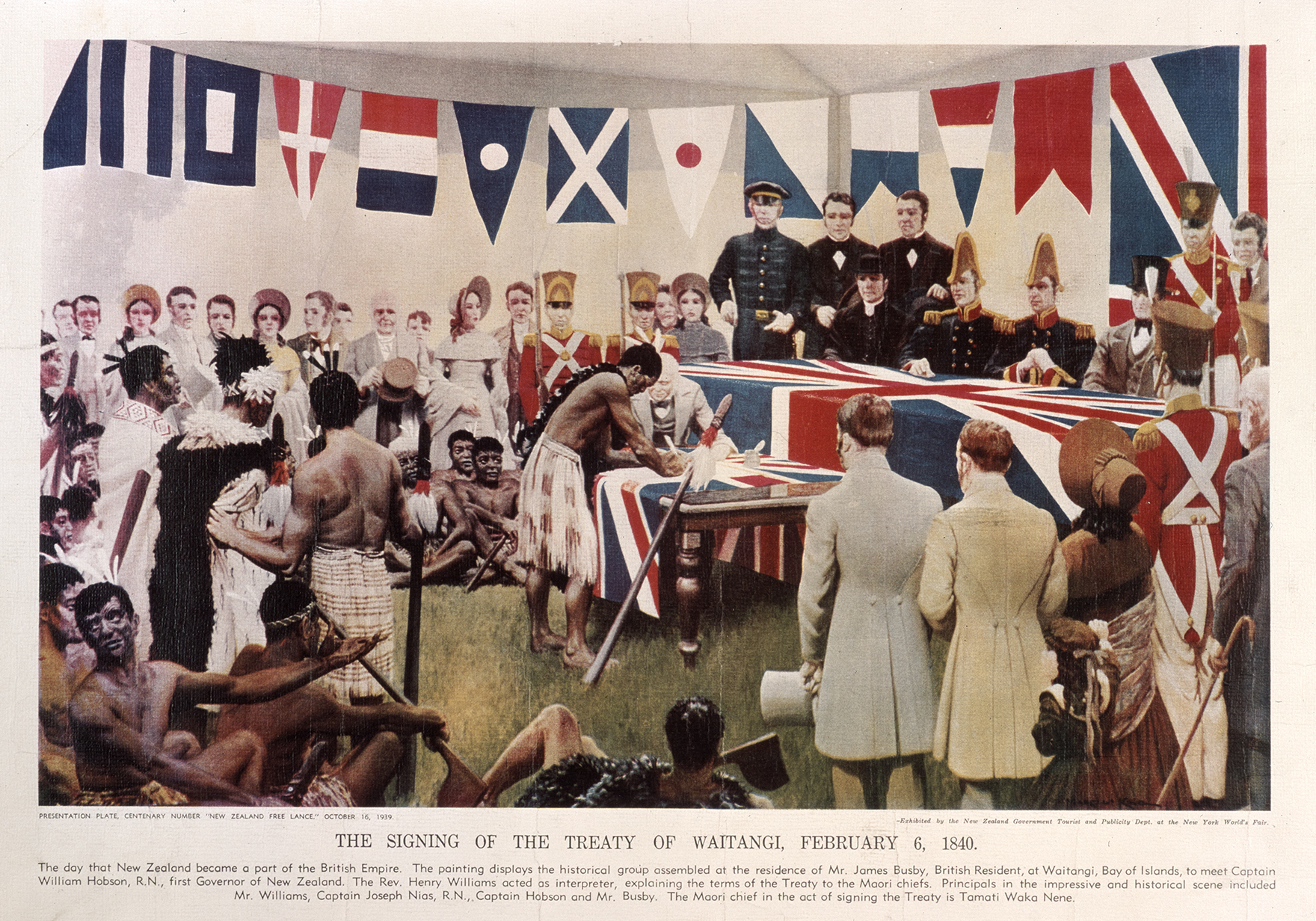
Depiction of the signing of the treaty on 6 February 1840

The principles of the Treaty of Waitangi (Māori: ngā mātāpono o te tiriti) are principles derived from both language versions of Treaty of Waitangi, signed in New Zealand in 1840. The phrase "principles of the Treaty of Waitangi" was first used in the Treaty of Waitangi Act 1975, and the principles were first expressed in mainstream law (but not codified) in 1987 after nearly a decade of development by the Waitangi Tribunal. The Tribunal was established by the Treaty of Waitangi Act, and their articulation of principles in accordance with the Tribunal's statutory role has been remarkably consistent, and principles continue to emerge and evolve rather than being static, or a code. In this way they represent a normative body of jurisprudence on western law.

== Treaty of Waitangi Act 1975 ==
The Treaty of Waitangi Act 1975 introduced the phrase "the principles of the Treaty of Waitangi". Reference to the principles occurred in the long title, the preamble, and sections 6(1) and 8(1), as it was enacted. Section 6(1) provides for the Waitangi Tribunal to inquire into claims by Māori that they are prejudicially affected by Crown acts (or omissions) that are inconsistent with the principles of the treaty. The long title of the act states:

An Act to provide for the observance, and confirmation, of the principles of the Treaty of Waitangi by establishing a Tribunal to make recommendations on claims relating to the practical application of the Treaty and to determine whether certain matters are inconsistent with the principles of the Treaty.

== Emergence of the treaty principles as principles of law ==
The text of neither te Tiriti nor the Treaty have been expressed directly in law. The texts do not have the same meaning, and while some consider that the 1840 texts "focus(es) on the issues relevant at the time it was (they were) signed", in reality the Treaty of Waitangi - the English language text - was not signed at all on 6 February 1840, and issues of Sovereignty and Governance and whenua and taonga are clearly as much issues today as they were in 1840. In the Treaty of Waitangi Act 1975 Parliament created a framework for the introduction of te Tiriti into law in a way that provided for the judiciary, rather than Parliament, to grapple with the meaning of the two texts and how those meanings might apply to real world and increasingly political circumstances. The Act requires the Waitangi Tribunal to adjudicate on whether matters brought before them were inconsistent with the principles of the Treaty. As such the principles have been developed by the Tribunal, and later by the courts. The jurisprudence of treaty principles leapt into the mainstream courts when Parliament began passing Acts referring to the principles of te Tiriti/the Treaty. Understanding and articulating those principles then became a normal matter of statutory interpretation for our courts, which is the basis of our legal system. According to some sources the principles are based loosely on these legal determinations of what were the treaty's original intentions and goals.

It is primarily elected representatitves in decision making roles and agencies of the State that are legally bound by the principles of te Tiriti/the Treaty, and the way in which the principles are applied varies in the face of the differing dimensions of the activity in question. Often, decisions and activities of State agencies are not carried in ways that reflect a compliance with te Tiriti, and these instances give rise to breaches of the principles and in some cases claims to the Tribunal. Relying on the courts to interpret te Tiriti and the treaty, and the space between them, in developing the principles has been celebrated as a legal and jurisprudential innovation unique to Aotearoa, although it is also criticised by some. The Waitangi Tribunal's key function is to evaluate Crown actions against the intentions of the parties that signed the Treaty. The Tribunal also has the specific authority to articulate the meaning of the two texts of the Treaty, within the context of Parliament's legislative scheme which requires the Tibunal to develop 'principles'. Hayward (2004) states:

The Tribunal's findings ... are expressed in the currency of treaty principles – which principles are applicable to the particular case, and how the Crown breached those principles, if at all.

In order to apply the Treaty of Waitangi in a way that is relevant both to the Crown and to Māori today, the Waitangi Tribunal and the courts must consider the broad sentiments, the intentions and the goals of the treaty, and then identify the relevant principles of the treaty on a case-by-case basis. Hayward (2004) concludes that: "... each Tribunal is required to determine the principles of each claim on a case by case basis".

== New Zealand Maori Council v Attorney-General 1987 case law ==
Where there are issues of statutory interpretation or judicial review proceedings, the courts of New Zealand follow the case law on the principles of the Treaty originating from New Zealand Maori Council v Attorney-General. This case was brought in the High Court by the New Zealand Māori Council in 1987. There was great concern at that time about the ongoing restructuring of the New Zealand economy by the Fourth Labour Government, specifically the transfer of assets from former government departments to state-owned enterprises. Because the state-owned enterprises were essentially private firms owned by the government, there was an argument that they would prevent assets that had been given by Māori for use by the state from being returned to Māori by the Waitangi Tribunal and through treaty settlements. The Māori Council sought enforcement of section 9 of the State-Owned Enterprises Act 1986, which reads: "Nothing in this Act shall permit the Crown to act in a manner that is inconsistent with the principles of the Treaty of Waitangi". The Court of Appeal, in a judgment of its president Sir Robin Cooke, decided upon the following treaty principles:

- The acquisition of sovereignty in exchange for the protection of rangatiratanga.
- The treaty established a partnership and imposed on the partners the duty to act reasonably and in good faith.
- The freedom of the Crown to govern.
- The Crown's duty of active protection.
- The duty of the Crown to remedy past breaches.
- Māori to retain rangatiratanga over their resources and taonga and have all citizenship privileges.
- Duty to consult.

== Fourth Labour Government's principles ==
In 1989, the Fourth Labour Government adopted the Principles for Crown Action on the Treaty of Waitangi. Therese Crocker has argued that Labour's publication of the principles "comprised one of a number of Crown responses to what is generally known as the 'Maori Renaissance'." Prime Minister David Lange, in an introduction to the document said of the principles that:

They [the principles] are not an attempt to rewrite the Treaty of Waitangi. These Crown principles are to help the Government make decisions about matters related to the Treaty. For instance, when the Government is considering recommendations from the Waitangi Tribunal.
I have said that the Treaty of Waitangi has the potential to be our nation's most powerful unifying symbol. I trust that these principles demonstrate that there is a place for all New Zealanders within the Treaty of Waitangi.

The principles in the 1989 publication are as follow:

The Kawanatanga Principle – The Principle of Government

The first Article of the Treaty gives expression to the right of the Crown to make laws and its obligation to govern in accordance with constitutional process. This sovereignty is qualified by the promise to accord the Maori interests specified in the second Article an appropriate priority.

This principle describes the balance between articles 1 and 2: the exchange of sovereignty by the Māori people for the protection of the Crown. It was emphasised in the context of this principle that "the Government has the right to govern and make laws". In a 1989 presentation about how the principles of The Treaty of Waitangi were intended to guide Crown action, Geoffrey Palmer noted: "The First and Second Articles of the Treaty are both strong statements which necessarily qualify one another. Kawanatanga is subject to a promise to protect rangatiratanga. Rangatiratanga is subject to an acknowledgement of kawanatanga."

The Rangatiratanga Principle – The Principle of Self Management

The second Article of the Treaty guarantees to iwi Maori the control and enjoyment of those resources and taonga that it is their wish to retain. The preservation of a resource base, restoration of iwi self-management, and the active protection of taonga, both material and cultural, are necessary elements of the Crown's policy of recognising rangatiratanga.

The Government also recognised the Court of Appeal's description of active protection, but identified the key concept of this principle as a right for iwi to organise as iwi and, under the law, to control the resources they own.

The Principle of Equality

The third Article of the Treaty constitutes a guarantee of legal equality between Maori and other citizens of New Zealand. This means that all New Zealand citizens are equal before the law. Furthermore, the common law system is selected by the Treaty as the basis for that equality although human rights accepted under international law are incorporated also.
The third Article also has an important social significance in the implicit assurance that social rights would be enjoyed equally by Maori with all New Zealand citizens of whatever origin. Special measures to attain that equal enjoyment of social benefits are allowed by international law.

The Principle of Cooperation

The Treaty is regarded by the Crown as establishing a fair basis for two peoples in one country. Duality and unity are both significant. Duality implies distinctive cultural development and unity implies common purpose and community. The relationship between community and distinctive development is governed by the requirement of cooperation which is an obligation placed on both parties by the Treaty.
Reasonable cooperation can only take place if there is consultation on major issues of common concern and if good faith, balance, and common sense are shown on all sides. The outcome of reasonable cooperation will be partnership.

The Principle of Redress

The Crown accepts a responsibility to provide a process for the resolution of grievances arising from the Treaty. This process may involve courts, the Waitangi Tribunal, or direct negotiation. The provision of redress, where entitlement is established, must take account of its practical impact and of the need to avoid the creation of fresh injustice. If the Crown demonstrates commitment to this process of redress then it will expect reconciliation to result.

== Principles in legislation ==
The Treaty of Waitangi principles have been widely incorporated into legislation, thus allowing them to influence New Zealand law. The legislation includes:

- Fisheries Act 1983
- Environment Act 1986
- State Owned Enterprises Act 1986
- Conservation Act 1987
- Resource Management Act 1991
- Crown Minerals Act 1991
- Marine and Coastal Area (Takutai Moana) Act 2011

By 2021, the Treaty of Waitangi or its principles were referred to in over thirty-five Acts.

In addition, principles have been incorporated into other government work and publications. For example, the Department of Conservation's Tongariro National Park Management Plan (2006) listed nine principles:

1. Kāwanatanga (Article I of the Treaty) The authority to make laws for the good order and security of the country.

2. Tino Rangatiratanga (Article II of the Treaty, Māori version) The right of Māori to exercise traditional authority and control over their land, resources, and taonga.

3. Exclusive and Undisturbed Possession (Article II of the Treaty, English version) The right of Māori to exclusive and undisturbed possession of their land, forests, estates, and fisheries.

4. Ōritetanga (Article III of the Treaty, both versions) The right of Māori and non-Māori alike to equality of treatment, and the privileges and responsibilities of citizenship.

5. Kaitiakitanga The right of Māori to undertake their duty of guardianship/custodianship/ stewardship of their land and resources, and taonga of significance to them.

6. Whakawhanaungatanga The Treaty provides for a partnership between Māori and the Crown, which requires the parties to afford each other reasonable co-operation and utmost good faith, in accordance with their Treaty obligations.

7. Tautiaki Ngangahau The duty of the Crown to ensure the active protection of taonga for as long as Māori so wish it.

8. He Here Kia Mōhio The duty of the Crown to make informed decisions.

9. Whakatika i te Mea He The duty of the Crown to remedy past breaches of the Treaty and to prevent further breaches.

As of 2025, the Ministry of Health lists five principles applicable to the wider health and disability system:

Tino rangatiratanga: Māori self-determination and mana motuhake in the design, delivery, and monitoring of health and disability services.

Equity: the Crown must commit to achieving equitable health outcomes for Māori.

Active protection: the Crown must act, as far as possible, to achieve equitable health outcomes for Māori.

Options: the Crown must provide for and resource kaupapa Māori health and disability services and ensure that all services are provided in a culturally appropriate way that recognises hauora Māori models of care.

Partnership: the Crown and Māori must work in partnership in the governance, design, delivery, and monitoring of health and disability services. Māori must be co-designers of the primary health system for Māori.

== Opposition to the principles ==
The "Principles of the Treaty of Waitangi Deletion Bill" was introduced to the New Zealand Parliament in 2005 as a member's bill by New Zealand First MP Doug Woolerton. "This bill eliminates all references to the expressions 'the principles of the Treaty', 'the principles of the Treaty of Waitangi' and the 'Treaty of Waitangi and its principles' from all New Zealand Statutes including all preambles, interpretations, schedules, regulations and other provisos included in or arising from each and every such Statute".

At the first reading of the bill, New Zealand First leader Winston Peters said:

this is not an attack on the treaty itself, but on the insertion of the term "the principles of the Treaty" into legislation.
...
This bill seeks to do three fundamental things. First, as the bill's title implies, it seeks to remove all references to the undefined and divisive term "the principles of the Treaty of Waitangi" from legislation. Second, it seeks to reverse the insidious culture of division that has grown up around the existence of these principles. It has seen Māori pitted against Māori and non-Māori, seen family members pitted against each other, and gone right to the heart of our social fabric. Finally, the bill aims to put an end to the expensive and never-ending litigious programme that has sprung up around these principles. This programme has diverted hundreds of millions of dollars into dead-end paths and away from the enlightened programmes that are the true pathway to success.

After failing to pass its first reading, the bill was reintroduced after the 2005 election, with the Labour Party promising to support the bill to select committee as part of its confidence and supply agreement with New Zealand First. This time, the Bill passed first reading 111 votes in favour (Labour, National, New Zealand First, United Future, ACT New Zealand, and Progressive), 10 votes against (Green Party, Māori Party).

That bill failed to pass its second reading in November 2007.

In a legal analysis of the bill for Chapman Tripp, David Cochrane argued that without the principles it would probably be an "impossible task" for the Waitangi Tribunal to carry out its role.

== Treaty Principles Bill ==
The ACT party has proposed a referendum on the Principles of the Treaty of Waitangi, something that gained media attention during the 2023 New Zealand general election campaign. There has been opposition to the proposed referendum by those who view it as unnecessary or divisive.

In November 2023, the National Party promised to support a Treaty Principles Bill to select committee as part of its coalition agreement with ACT.

ACT embarked on a public information campaign in early February 2024 to promote its Treaty Principles Bill. This campaign included the creation of a new website called "treaty.nz," that has a video featuring ACT's leader, David Seymour. The campaign also referred to a leaked Justice Ministry memo about the bill.

On 14 November 2024, the Treaty Principles Bill was first debated in the House. Some Māori party MPs were named by the Speaker for disruptive behavior. The Bill passed its first reading despite opposition from the Labour, Māori and Green parties. Support from the National Party and NZ First was guaranteed under the coalition agreement, but only up to the second reading.

== See also ==
- Co-governance
