= Carncot Independent School for Girls and Boys =

Carncot Independent School
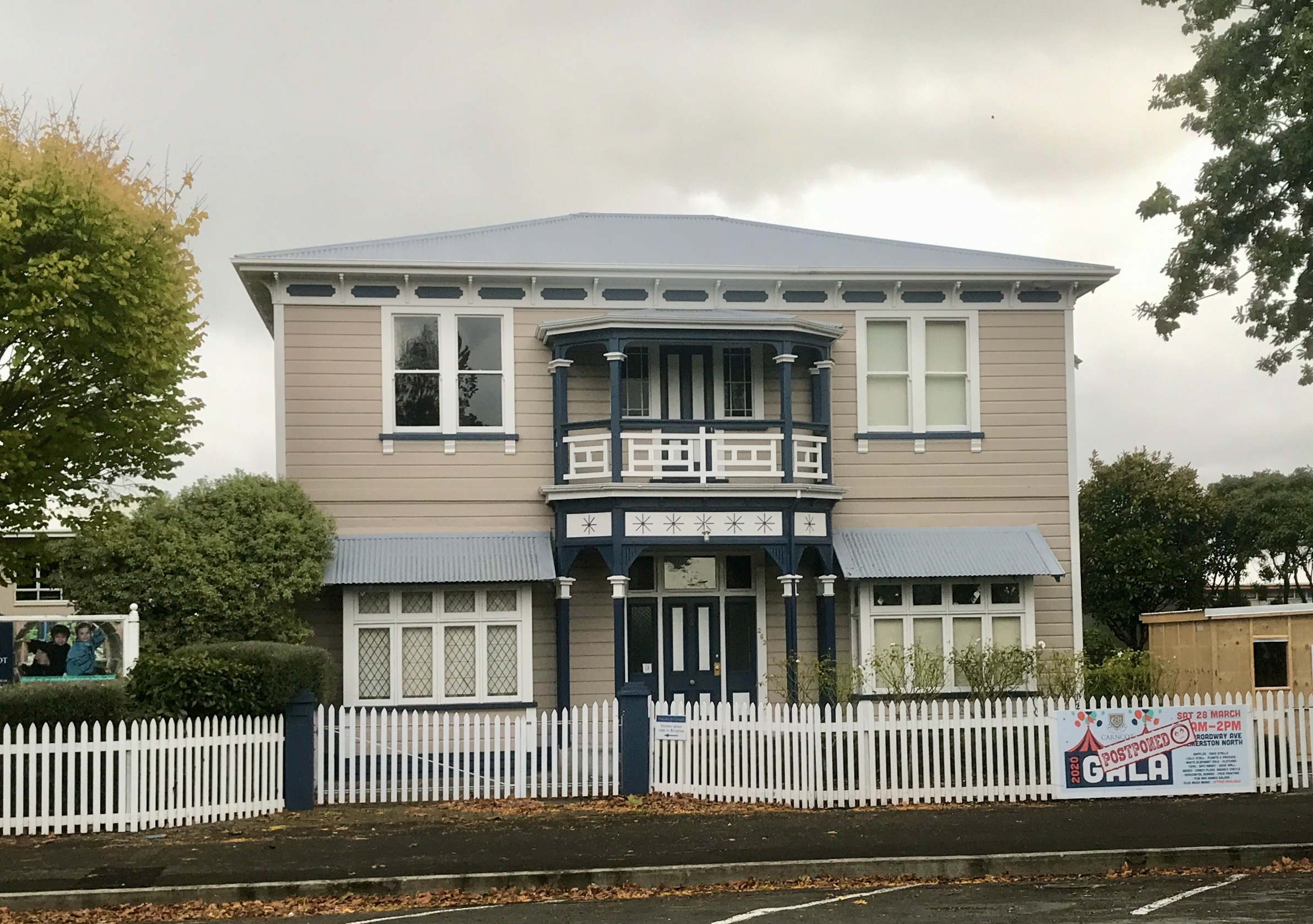

Location
- 263 Broadway Avenue, Palmerston North; 40.349770°S 175.621691°E

Information
- Type: Coeducational Independent day school Years 1–8
- Motto: Veritas omnia vincit - Truth conquers all
- Established: Circa 1903
- Ministry of Education Institution no.: 4101
- Principal: Shelley Driver
- Enrolment: 129 (July 2026)
- Website: www.carncot.school.nz

Carncot Independent School is a coeducational independent day school serving Years 1 to 8. It is located close to the centre of the city of Palmerston North, in the Manawatū District, New Zealand. Europeans make up 70% of the roll, with Māori, Pacific Island, European, South African, Middle, and Far Eastern families also represented. The school accepts international students.

== History ==
About 1903, Constance Stanford began taking students for her school, which was located in rooms above William Park's stationery shop on Broadway. The school moved to several different locations until taking up residence in the Fitzherbert homestead on its present site at 263 Broadway Avenue in 1955. In 1998, the house was moved forward and a new school was built at the back to accommodate an increasing role. In 2003, a new gymnasium was added. The old school hall was converted into a music suite and the art gallery was opened in 2009.

Both boys and girls have attended junior school since the early days, but no boys were enrolled in the last quarter of a century. Until 2013, Carncot was one of a handful of schools offering primary education in a girls-only context.

In late 2012, it was announced that for the first time in 30 years, boys between years 1 and 6 would be able to enrol at the school from 2013. The school is now fully co-educational from Years 1 to 8.

The school is governed by the Carncot Trust Board.

The staff is composed of a principal, an associate principal, nine classroom teachers, and an administration team of seven staff.

== See also ==
- List of schools in New Zealand
