= Treaty of Waitangi Act 1975 =

Act of New Zealand Parliament

New Zealand Parliament
- Long title: An Act to provide for the observance, and confirmation, of the principles of the Treaty of Waitangi by establishing a Tribunal to make recommendations on claims relating to the practical application of the Treaty and to determine whether certain matters are inconsistent with the principles of the Treaty.
- Royal assent: 10 October 1975
- Commenced: Immediate

Legislative history
- Introduced by: Matiu Rata
- Passed: 1975

Amended by
- 1985, 1988 (twice), 1993, 2006

Related legislation
- State-Owned Enterprises Act 1986
- Status: Current legislation

The Treaty of Waitangi Act 1975 gave the Treaty of Waitangi recognition in New Zealand law for the first time and established the Waitangi Tribunal. The tribunal is empowered to investigate possible breaches of the principles of the Treaty of Waitangi by the New Zealand Government or any state-controlled body, occurring after 1975. It was also empowered to recommend, but not enforce, remedies.

The treaty had been a focus of Māori activism for several years, but many Māori were disappointed in the efficacy of the Waitangi Tribunal. Most of the significant breaches of the treaty, such as land confiscation in the New Zealand Wars, had occurred in the nineteenth century, and the tribunal was initially in 1975 powerless to investigate these. The act was amended in 1985 to enable it to consider claims dating back to 1840.

== Purpose ==
On 8 November 1974, Matiu Rata introduced the Treaty of Waitangi Bill in Parliament and stated:

Its purpose is to provide for the observation and confirmation of the principles of the Treaty of Waitangi and to determine claims about certain matters which are inconsistent with those principles.

The long title of the Treaty of Waitangi Act 1975 states that it is:

An Act to provide for the observance, and confirmation, of the principles of the Treaty of Waitangi by establishing a Tribunal to make recommendations on claims relating to the practical application of the Treaty and to determine whether certain matters are inconsistent with the principles of the Treaty.

The preamble to the Treaty of Waitangi Act 1975 states:

Whereas on the 6th day of February 1840 a Treaty was entered into at Waitangi between Her late Majesty Queen Victoria and the Maori people of New Zealand:

And whereas the text of the Treaty in the English language differs from the text of the Treaty in the Maori language:

And whereas it is desirable that a Tribunal be established to make recommendations on claims relating to the practical application of the principles of the Treaty and, for that purpose, to determine its meaning and effect and whether certain matters are inconsistent with those principles.

== Amendments ==
=== 1985 jurisdiction extended to 1840 ===
In 1985 the act was amended to give the Waitangi Tribunal the authority to consider claims dating back to 1840, when the Treaty of Waitangi was signed. It also enlarged the tribunal's membership to enable it to handle the increased number of claims. It also required the tribunal to have a Māori majority, although this requirement was removed in 1988.

The 1985 amendment considerably broadened the scope of the tribunal's inquiries and led to ongoing debate over the appropriate response by the Crown to the findings and recommendations of the tribunal (see Treaty of Waitangi claims and settlements). It was part of the Fourth Labour government's policy of giving greater acknowledgment to the treaty, as was the inclusion of references to the principles of the Treaty of Waitangi in other legislation, such as the State-Owned Enterprises Act 1986. This amendment was one of the most important steps towards making the treaty relevant in New Zealand law and society.

=== 1988 tribunal membership and hearings ===
This amendment further expanded the tribunal's membership and abolished the requirement for a Māori majority. It also enabled different groups of tribunal members to investigate different claims simultaneously.

=== 1988 covenants on claimed State owned enterprise land ===
This amendment came about following a court case in which the government was found to be ignoring the principles of the Treaty of Waitangi by attempting to sell state-owned land which might be subject to treaty claims. The amendment enabled covenants to be placed on such land stating that it might be claimed back by the tribunal, even if in private hands. It also gave the tribunal the power to compulsorily acquire such land. This is the only instance in which the tribunal is able to issue legally binding orders.

=== 1993 prohibition on recommendations over private land ===
This amendment came about following the controversial recommendation in the Waitangi Tribunal's Te Roroa Report that the Crown purchase an area of private land for return to claimants in a settlement. The owners of the land argued that the recommendation devalued their properties. The amendment prohibits the tribunal from recommending the return or purchase by the Crown of any private land, other than that covered by the covenants noted above.

=== 2006 all historical claims to be lodged by September 2008 ===
This amends section 6 of the Treaty of Waitangi Act to set a closing date of 1 September 2008 for submitting historical treaty claims, defined as those relating to acts or omissions of the Crown prior to 21 September 1992. It allows existing claims to be amended and does not affect the settlement of historical claims that have already been lodged, or the ability to lodge claims relating to grievances relating to acts or omissions after September 1992.

=== Other amendments ===
Legislation implementing various historical treaty settlements amends section 6 of the Treaty of Waitangi Act to exclude the jurisdiction of the Waitangi Tribunal from further considering the historical claims of the group receiving the settlement.

== 2014 Waitangi Tribunal findings ==
In response to the Te Paparahi o Te Raki (Wai 1040) inquiry, the Waitangi Tribunal concluded in 2014 that Māori never conceded their sovereignty in the 1840 treaty as part of Stage One of their inquiry. Stage Two of the inquiry will consider events after 1840.

== 2025 review ==
In early May 2025, Minister of Māori Development Tama Potaka announced that an "independent technical advisory group" would review the Treaty of Waitangi Act 1975, focusing on the scope of the Waitangi Tribunal. The Sixth National Government had committed to reviewing the scope of the Waitangi Tribunal as part of its coalition agreements with the ACT and New Zealand First parties.

== Parliamentary debates ==
- New Zealand Parliamentary Debates vol.395 (1974), pp. 5725–9.
- New Zealand Parliamentary Debates vol.401 (1975), pp. 4342–6, 4495-500.
- New Zealand Parliamentary Debates vol.402 (1975), pp. 5406–8.
- New Zealand Parliamentary Debates vol.460 (1984–85), pp. 2702–13, 6059-83, 8626-31.
- New Zealand Parliamentary Debates vol.485 (1987), pp. 1715–34.
- New Zealand Parliamentary Debates vol.488 (1988), pp. 3970–81, 4017-28.
- New Zealand Parliamentary Debates vol.489 (1988), pp. 4560–86, 4775-91.
- New Zealand Parliamentary Debates vol.492 (1988), pp. 6611–16.
- New Zealand Parliamentary Debates vol.494 (1988), pp. 7927–33, 8217-24.
- New Zealand Parliamentary Debates vol.495 (1988), pp. 8525–35, 8861-72.
- New Zealand Parliamentary Debates vol.632 (2006), pp. 3951–69.
- New Zealand Parliamentary Debates vol.636 (2006), pp. 6965–84, 7021-33.
