= Continuing trespass =

A continuing trespass is:

- a wrongful act involving a course of action which is a direct invasion of the rights of another.
- a trespass in the taking of goods, although without intent to appropriate them, followed by an appropriation, the original trespass being deemed to continue to the time of the appropriation, so that the subsequent appropriation is larceny.
