= The Laws of New Zealand =

Encyclopedia of New Zealand law

The Laws of New Zealand is an encyclopedia that is intended to provide a reliable statement of the whole law of New Zealand – statutory, regulatory, and judicial. Publication commenced in 1992. It is published by LexisNexis and is the only current encyclopaedia of New Zealand law. It is the New Zealand equivalent of Halsbury's Laws of England. Each title includes extensive cross-referencing to other titles as well as to Halsbury’s Laws of England and Halsbury's Laws of Australia.

Authors, who include Judges, academics, and senior members of the New Zealand legal profession, were appointed by the founding Editor-in-Chief, Lord Cooke of Thorndon. After October 2007, he was succeeded by Justice John McGrath of the Supreme Court of New Zealand. Justice McGrath died in 2018. The authors gave the publication its authority through their specialist and practical knowledge of New Zealand law. It was accordingly intended to be recognised as a work of extremely high quality.

The printed work consists of approximately 150 titles distributed in approximately 40 ring binders with other binders providing for the service updates which are produced quarterly. The work is also available online and on CD, with the service updates in those media being consolidated into the titles. Several individual titles are reissued each year.
