= Philip Cooke (judge) =

New Zealand judge

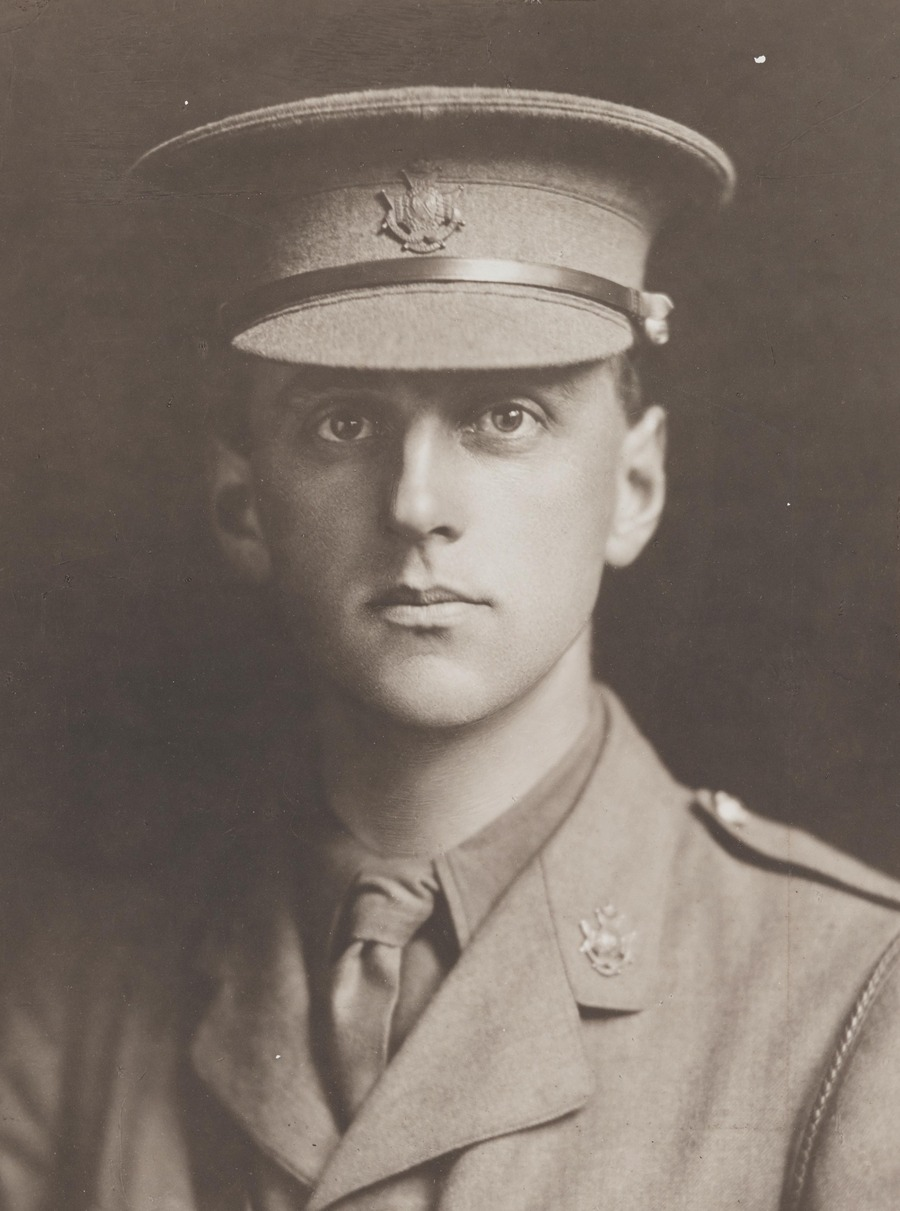
Cooke in WWI uniform

Philip Brunskill Cooke MC QC (3 January 1893 – 11 November 1956) was a New Zealand judge and decorated WWI veteran.

== Early life ==
Cooke was born on 3 January 1893 in Palmerston North, New Zealand. His father, Frank Cooke, was the town's Crown Prosecutor. His maternal grandfather was Dr Francis Alexander Monckton, a doctor and entrepreneur from Southland who was later mayor of Feilding.

Cooke received his education at Huntley School in Marton, Wanganui Collegiate School and at Victoria University College. In 1910, Cooke had placed 18th in the Senior National Scholarships. He graduated with LL.B. in June 1913.

== War service and professional life ==
During his studies, Cooke was an associate to the Chief Justice, Robert Stout. When he graduated, he joined of office of Chapman, Skerrett, Tripp, and Blair (now known as Chapman Tripp), although he was initially too young to be admitted as a barrister. At the firm, he was Charles Skerrett's principal assistant. At the outbreak of World War I, he enlisted and became 2nd lieutenant with the Divisional Signalling Corps. In the 1918 Birthday Honours, he received a Military Cross.

Aged 36, Cooke had the opportunity to be appointed the country's youngest ever judge, but he declined for a variety of reasons. When he was appointed King's Counsel on 30 January 1936, he was at age 43 the youngest appointee in New Zealand up to that point. He was succeeded in the honour of being the youngest appointee by his son, Robin Cooke, who was aged 38 when he received his appointment in 1964.

Cooke volunteered at Army Headquarters during World War II for a year before he gave up his practice completely. He was Director of Personal Services for the army for two years. In 1946, he was elected President of the New Zealand Law Society, a role he held for four years. Cooke was appointed as a judge at the Supreme Court on 31 March 1950, and served as a judge of that Court until illness forced him to retire.

== Family and death ==
On 23 April 1924, Cooke married Valmai Gore at St Pauls Pro Cathedral, Wellington. Her grandfather, Richard Benjamin Gore, had been one of the Wellington pioneers. The reception was held at the Wellington Art Gallery.

The Cookes had one son and one daughter. Their son, Robin (1926–2006), became one of New Zealand's most influential jurists. Their daughter was born in 1929.

Cooke died on 11 November 1956 in his home town Wellington from an illness.

== See also ==
- List of King's and Queen's Counsel in New Zealand
