= Parliamentary sovereignty =

Constitutional legal doctrine

Parliamentary sovereignty, also called parliamentary supremacy or legislative supremacy, is a concept in the constitutional law of some parliamentary democracies. It holds that the legislative body has absolute sovereignty and is supreme over all other government institutions, including executive or judicial bodies. It also holds that the legislative body may change or repeal any previous legislation and so it is not bound by written law (in some cases, not even a constitution) or by precedent.

In some countries, parliamentary sovereignty may be contrasted with separation of powers and constitutionalism, which limits the legislature's scope often to general law-making and makes it subject to external judicial review, where laws passed by the legislature may be declared invalid in certain circumstances.

States that have sovereign legislatures include: the United Kingdom, New Zealand, the Netherlands, Sweden, Finland, Jamaica, Israel.

== Australia ==
Under the federal system, neither the states nor the federal parliament in Australia have true parliamentary sovereignty. The Commonwealth Parliament is created by the federal constitution, and only has enumerated powers. Each state's legislative power is inherent but restrained by the federal constitution, the relevant state constitution, and Commonwealth powers. Nevertheless, in the Australian context, "parliamentary supremacy" is used contextually as a term and has two meanings: one is that parliament (the legislature) can make and unmake any law; another meaning is that as long as a parliament (legislature) has the power to make laws regarding a subject matter, the exercise of that power cannot be challenged or reviewed by the judiciary. The second meaning is more consistent with the federal system and the practice of judicial review, as the judiciary cannot review on the merits of the parliament (legislature)'s exercise of power.

Blackshield & Williams (2010) explain that "[i]n Australia, the idea of Parliamentary Sovereignty must be understood in the context of the rigid limits and boundaries imposed by the federal Constitution, and to some extent by the State Constitutions as well." Goss (2021) goes further and argues that the ideas of parliamentary sovereignty and parliamentary supremacy are "inaccurate, inadequate, or unnecessary" usages in Australian law.

The constitution confers the power to make laws in the Commonwealth Parliament, however, this is limited to particular subjects. Section 128 of the federal constitution prescribes the mode to alter the constitution, which further restricts the power of the Commonwealth Parliament.

The supremacy clause (section 109 of the constitution) gives Commonwealth laws precedence over state laws. The state law-making power is therefore constrained where the Commonwealth has concurrent law-making power. Furthermore, regarding the subject matters which Commonwealth has concurrent legislative power, the Commonwealth Parliament can "cover the field", which means the Commonwealth can, by express words or by implication, exclude the operations of state laws. The Commonwealth Parliament has exclusive legislative power over the subject matters listed in sections 52 and 92 of the constitution, which means that the states cannot make laws in these areas. Also, under section 96 of the constitution, the Commonwealth can use financial assistance to entice states to refrain from exercising their legislative powers, such as refraining from collecting income tax.

Each state parliament power is subject to procedural limitation, which is the entrenchment of restrictive legislative procedure. Section 6 of the Australia Act states that laws concerning the "constitution, power or procedure of the parliament" are invalid unless passed in the manner and form prescribed by the legislation made by the parliament.

== Belgium ==
Over the last forty years or so, a change has been observed in Belgium in the relationships between the judiciary and Parliament. The "dogma of absolute inviolability of the parliamentary assemblies" used to exist but has been "breached". The parliamentary assemblies are now accountable not just to the electors but also to the courts.

A first breach opened up by the Le Ski judgement of 27 May 1971, in which the Belgian Court of Cassation upheld the supremacy of the norm of self-executing international law. Then in 1980, Article 142 of the Constitution (former Article 107 ter) established a Court of Arbitration in Belgium, nowadays the Constitutional Court, charged with hearing actions for annulment of laws. It would hand down its first judgement on 5 April 1985.

A second breach was opened in the dogma of inviolability of the assemblies was by the Constitutional Court, in its judgement no. 31/96 of 15 May 1996. The Council of State, the highest administrative Court in Belgium, which had previously always insisted it had no jurisdiction to hear annulment applications against the administrative acts by the Houses of Parliament, declared that the absence of any possibility to apply for the annulment of such acts was contrary to the constitutional principles of equality and non-discrimination, opened up a new avenue for judicial review of Parliament's acts: the laws of 25 May 1999 and of 15 May 2007, adopted in the wake of the Court's judgement, extended the jurisdiction of the Supreme Administrative Court to the acts and Rules of Procedure of the legislative assemblies or their organs with regard to public procurement and personnel.

Third and finally, concerning the decisions taken by the assemblies with regard to MPs or political groups, the civil courts have not hesitated to sanction them when subjective rights were at stake. MPs "enjoy the protection of their subjective rights by the law courts. This principle applies both for rights deriving from the law in the broad sense and for rights which have a regulatory basis".

== Finland ==
According to the constitution of Finland sovereign power lies with the people, represented by the parliament. As the highest organ of government the parliament holds supreme legislative power and can override a presidential veto and alter the constitution. There is no constitutional court and the supreme court does not have an explicit right to declare a law unconstitutional.

By principle, the constitutionality of laws in Finland is verified by a simple vote in the parliament. However, the Constitutional Law Committee of the parliament reviews any doubtful bills and recommends changes, if needed. In practice, the Constitutional Law Committee fulfills the duties of a constitutional court. In addition to preview by the Constitutional Law Committee, all Finnish courts of law have the obligation to give precedence to the constitution when there is an obvious conflict between the Constitution and a regular law.

The power to alter and amend the constitution is vested with the parliament, requiring approval either by a two-thirds vote in a single parliament if the proposed alteration is first declared to be urgent by a five-sixths vote of the same parliament, or by a slower procedure of first passing the amendment by a majority in the then current parliament and then passing the amendment by a two-thirds vote in the following parliament that convenes after a general election. A Finnish peculiarity is that the parliament can make exceptions to the constitution in ordinary laws that are enacted in the same procedure as constitutional amendments. An example of such a law is the State of Preparedness Act which gives the Council of State certain exceptional powers in cases of national emergency. As these powers, which correspond to U.S. executive orders, affect constitutional basic rights, the law was enacted in the same manner as a constitutional amendment. However, it can be repealed in the same manner as an ordinary law.

Executive power is shared by the President of the Republic and the cabinet. The latter must rely on the confidence of parliament. From the independence of Finland in 1917 up to the constitutional reform of 1999, the president held considerable executive powers, and in particular was able to call a re-election of the parliament at will. In order to strengthen the role of the parliament as the highest organ of government, the constitutional reform constrained most of the presidential powers to be exercised only on the advice of the cabinet.

== Israel ==
Israel's political system has many features of parliamentary sovereignty, including fusion of powers, a unicameral legislature, and a constitutional framework that can be amended by the legislature with an ordinary majority (Basic Laws of Israel); however, it also has judicial review of primary legislation, which was first exercised in 1969 to strike down a law which was passed in violation of an entrenched provision. In Israel, issues surrounding the Knesset's liability to judicial review have been contested by the courts over the last 30 years. In 2024, the Israeli Supreme Court, in an 8 to 7 decision, struck down a bill passed in the Knesset which aimed to restrict the courts from exercising judicial review on government actions as unreasonable.

== Italy ==
The sovereignty of Parliament in Italy is born from parliamentary privilege, but, in one of the most comprehensive and compelling "systemic" judgments, the Constitutional Court (rapporteur Carlo Mezzanotte) had opened the justiciability of interna corporis. Traces of the old theories are expressed in autodichia, which involves subtracting the ordinary courts of all acts performed within the Chambers. The choice to set off some acts to the Presidents of the Parliament has been criticized as an attempt to exclude them from judicial review, even when pertaining to individual rights: this has given rise to some conflicts between the judiciary and Parliament, brought to the Constitutional Court, who gave useful elements to restrict the legal definition, compelling the legal doctrine through the modern evolution of the sovereignty of Parliament.

== New Zealand ==
The concept in New Zealand is derived from that in the United Kingdom. The parliament, which consists of the monarch (represented by the governor-general of New Zealand) and the New Zealand House of Representatives, exercises sovereignty.

The constitutional position in New Zealand [...] is clear and unambiguous. Parliament is supreme and the function of the courts is to interpret the law as laid down by Parliament. The courts do not have a power to consider the validity of properly enacted laws.

Some legal experts such as Robin Cooke in Taylor v New Zealand Poultry Board [1984] have questioned how far parliamentary sovereignty goes. There are several laws and conventions that limit the exercise of parliamentary sovereignty. For example, the maximum term of Parliament and some other matters relating to the electoral system may only be altered by a parliamentary supermajority or by a majority in a popular referendum. However, these requirements may be themselves altered by a parliamentary majority.

== Norway ==
The principle of separation of powers laid out by the constitution of 1814, was challenged in 1884 when a parliamentary majority led by the (Liberal party (Venstre)) impeached the government appointed by King Oscar II.

== United Kingdom ==
=== History ===
In Medieval England, legislative power was exercised by the Sovereign acting on the advice of the Curia regis, or Royal Council, in which important magnates and clerics participated and which evolved into parliament. In 1265, the Earl of Leicester irregularly called a full parliament without royal authorisation. Membership of the so-called Model Parliament, established in 1295 under Edward I, eventually came to be divided into two branches: bishops, abbots, earls, and barons formed the House of Lords, while the two knights from each shire and two burgesses from each borough led the House of Commons. The king would seek the advice and consent of both houses before making any law. During Henry VI's reign, it became regular practice for the two houses to originate legislation in the form of bills, which would not become law unless the sovereign's assent was obtained, as the sovereign was, and still remains, the enactor of laws. Hence, all Acts include the clause "Be it enacted by the King's (Queen's) most Excellent Majesty, by and with the advice and consent of the Lords Spiritual and Temporal, and Commons, in this present Parliament assembled, and by the authority of the same, as follows...". The Parliament Acts 1911 and 1949 provide a second potential preamble if the House of Lords were to be excluded from the process.

During the 17th century in England, a notion developed that Parliament (made up of the House of Lords and House of Commons) shared in sovereignty with the king, based on an entirely erroneous notion of the history of Parliament. It was not until the changing of the coronation oath in the Coronation Oath Act 1688 as part of the Glorious Revolution that Parliament was recognised as part of the constitutional structure, with laws being considered to emanate from Parliament and not just the King. The Bill of Rights 1689 and Claim of Right Act 1689 were passed the following year which asserted certain rights of the parliaments of England (which at the time included Wales) and Scotland and limited the powers of the monarch. Furthermore, in 1698 Parliament created the Civil List, a financial arrangement that left the monarch reliant on Parliament for income.

Parliament means, in the mouth of a lawyer (though the word has often a different sense in conversation) the King, the House of Lords, and the House of Commons: these three bodies acting together may be aptly described as the "King in Parliament", and constitute Parliament. The principle of Parliamentary sovereignty means neither more nor less than this, namely that Parliament thus defined has, under the English constitution, the right to make or unmake any law whatever: and, further, that no person or body is recognised by the law of England as having a right to override or set aside the legislation of Parliament.

— A. V. Dicey Introduction to the Study of the Law of the Constitution (1885)

After 1689 English parliamentary supremacy became evident in the relation of the English parliament to those of Scotland and Ireland. The Act of Settlement 1701 made a presumption upon Scotland: the Scots retaliated with the Act of Security 1704, which was countered by the Alien Act 1705: the issue was settled by the Union of the parliaments of England and Scotland in 1707 which created a new British parliament, though "in essence it was just an extension of the English parliament". However the truth of that comment historically, legally under the Treaty of Union as implemented by the Acts of Union of 1706/7, the English and Scottish parliaments had given up their rights and sovereignty to the new, Union Parliament. Perhaps it is more correct to say that they had "pooled" their sovereignty. It is arguable whether the concept of parliamentary supremacy arose from the Acts of Union 1707 or was a doctrine that evolved thereafter. The autonomy of the Parliament of Ireland also came under attack and the Declaratory Act 1720 made the Irish parliament a dependency. The so-called Constitution of 1782 removed British parliamentary supremacy over Ireland for a short period but then the Irish parliament was merged with Britain's in the Acts of Union 1800.

The doctrine of parliamentary supremacy may be summarised in three points:

- Parliament can make laws concerning anything.
- No parliament can bind a future parliament (that is, it cannot pass a law that cannot be changed or reversed by a future parliament).
- A valid Act of Parliament cannot be questioned by the court. Parliament is the supreme lawmaker.

Some scholars and judges have questioned the traditional view that Parliament cannot bind itself, arguing that it can impose procedural (or "manner and form") restrictions on itself, since the legislature must be constituted and regulated by legal rules.

The notion of parliamentary sovereignty began to be challenged with the Parliament Act 1911 which changed the nature of what was meant by Parliament, as Dicey regretfully noted in the Introduction to the 8th edition of his Introduction to the Study of the Law of the Constitution (1915), but that while the reality was now Cabinet and political party were supreme (pp lxxii–lxxiv), in law Parliament was still sovereign albeit that "the share of sovereignty" of the Commons had increased (p xlii).

=== England and the UK generally ===
Parliamentary supremacy is cited by contemporary American legal historians as the reason English law did not develop due process in the American sense. It is also argued to be integral to the way in which England's approach to rights and liberties evolved.

The doctrine of parliamentary supremacy was demonstrated in, for example, the War Damage Act 1965. In English Law, it was upheld in 2005 by Lord Bingham in the case of R (Jackson) v Attorney General:

The bedrock of the British Constitution is ... the Supremacy of the Crown in Parliament.

However, there is a distinction to be made between legal sovereignty and political sovereignty. Parliament is not politically sovereign, which means that if Parliament passes unpopular or oppressive legislation, then it may not be applied in practice; for example, the various civil servants who administer laws within government departments may be relied upon to use any loopholes and vague language which exists in a Bill to get around unwanted areas, and the judiciary is likely to purposefully interpret and create precedent for said laws in a similar manner. However this does not necessarily mean that Parliament is not legally sovereign. It is argued that nonetheless Parliament can legally pass any legislation it wishes. This point is made clearly by Lord Reid in Madzimbamuto v Lardner-Burke [1969] 1 AC 645:

It is often said that it would be unconstitutional for the United Kingdom Parliament to do certain things, meaning that the moral, political and other reasons against doing them are so strong that most people would regard it as highly improper if Parliament did these things. But that does not mean that it is beyond the power of Parliament to do such things. If Parliament chose to do any of them, the courts would not hold the Act of Parliament invalid.

=== Scotland and the Acts of Union ===
It is not necessarily the case that parliamentary sovereignty extends to changing the Act of Union at will.

=== Recent developments ===
In recent years some judges and scholars in Britain and New Zealand have questioned the traditional view that parliament is sovereign. Others, however, have rejected these arguments. Various constitutional changes in the United Kingdom have influenced the renewed debate about parliamentary sovereignty, discussed in the below subsections.

However, Parliament may theoretically withdraw from commitments it has made or repeal any of the constraints it has imposed on its ability to legislate.

==== Devolution ====
With the devolution of power to local legislatures in Scotland (Scottish Parliament), Wales (Senedd) and Northern Ireland (Northern Ireland Assembly), all three bodies can pass primary legislation within the areas that have been devolved to them, but their powers nevertheless all stem from the UK Parliament and can be withdrawn unilaterally.

Particularly, in Northern Ireland, devolution dates back over a century but has been suspended multiple times due to political deadlocks and sectarian conflicts. Parliament retains the power to legislate for these three nations in any area, seen in the Northern Ireland (Executive Formation etc) Act 2019 which altered abortion law in Northern Ireland, which had been devolved to the Northern Ireland Assembly.

==== Former EU membership ====
The UK's membership of the European Communities, later the European Union, from 1973 until 2020, also influenced the debate around the sovereignty of Parliament.

The EU represents, as the European Court of Justice ruled in 1963 in the case Van Gend en Loos, a "new legal order of international law for the benefit of which the [Member] States have limited their sovereign rights, albeit within limited fields". The UK became part of that legal order, though as UK membership of the EU has been brought about through Acts of Parliament – principally the European Communities Act 1972 – Parliament could, as a matter of UK law, have passed further legislation unilaterally withdrawing the UK from the Union, or selectively barring the application of European law within the UK.

The repealed European Union Act 2011 reaffirmed that sovereignty lay with the British Parliament, with section 18 stating: "Directly applicable or directly effective EU law (that is, the rights, powers, liabilities, obligations, restrictions, remedies and procedures referred to in section 2(1) of the European Communities Act 1972) falls to be recognized and available in law in the United Kingdom only by virtue of that Act or where it is required to be recognised and available in law by virtue of any other Act." The Act also required that a referendum be held when more powers are transferred to the European Union (though this could be repealed with another Act of Parliament).

Alternatively, as prescribed by the 2016 Brexit referendum, an Act to withdraw from the European Union could be passed in parallel with the withdrawal procedure laid down in Article 50 of the Lisbon Treaty, whereby a member state would notify the European Council of its intention to withdraw from the union and a withdrawal agreement would be negotiated between the union and the state. The treaties would cease to be applicable to that state from the date of the agreement or, failing that, within two years of the notification.

==== Protection of particular statutes as constitutional in nature ====
Following the case of Thoburn v Sunderland City Council certain statutes are perceived to be protected as constitutional statutes. The case involved amendments to the Weights and Measures Act 1985 by the Weights and Measures Act 1985 (Metrication) (Amendment) Order 1994 pursuant to Directive 80/181/EEC. This stated that Imperial measurements could be displayed so long as the metric measurements were displayed in larger type beside them. Thoburn was convicted for only displaying Imperial measurements. In his defence he argued that allowing even limited use of Imperial measurements was inconsistent with the European directive and therefore in contravention of Section 2(2) of the European Communities Act 1972, and that the relevant section of the 1972 Act had therefore been implicitly repealed. However, the judgment by Lord Justice Laws held that certain statutes of constitutional importance, including Magna Carta and the European Communities Act 1972, could not be repealed by implied repeal. The case also introduces the concept of a "hierarchy of acts", which is used in other European countries, to English constitutional law. However, if Parliament did make its intention to overrule any statute express then any statute can be repealed, and so sovereignty is preserved.

==== Human Rights Act ====
The enactment of the Human Rights Act 1998 which incorporates part of the European Convention on Human Rights into domestic law. The Act gives UK courts the power to issue a declaration of incompatibility where they believe that the terms of an Act of Parliament are in contravention of the rights guaranteed by the Human Rights Act. The effect of the declaration is not to annul the contravening Act but to send a signal to Parliament which may then choose to amend the offending provision. This does not endanger parliamentary sovereignty because Parliament may choose not to amend the offending provisions. As with the UK's former membership of the European Union, the principle of parliamentary supremacy means that Parliament can at any time vote to repeal the Human Rights Act, and indeed the UK's ratification of the convention itself.

== See also ==
- Factortame case
- Fusion of powers
- Kompetenz-kompetenz
- Parliament of the United Kingdom and Constitution of the United Kingdom; also Parliament in the Making
- Political legitimacy
- Royal prerogative in the United Kingdom
- Section 33 of the Canadian Charter of Rights and Freedoms
- Types of democracy
- Unitary executive theory
- Westminster system
