= New Zealand Māori Council =

Māori representative body in New Zealand

The New Zealand Māori Council (Māori: Te Kaunihera Maori o Aoteaora) is a body that represents and consults the Māori people of New Zealand. As one of the oldest Māori representative groups, the council exerts pressure on New Zealand governments to protect Treaty of Waitangi rights.

== Structure ==
In 1962, the council was created by the Maori Welfare Act. The act was renamed to the Maori Community Development Act by the 1979 Maori Purposes Act. The council often acts as the legal entity representing groups of iwi and hapū, and offers a forum for them to act collectively.

The council is formed of representatives from 16 District Māori Councils. As of June 2021, the council is co-chaired by Harvey Ruru, chair of the Te Tau Ihu District Māori Council, and George Ngatai, chair of the Tamaki ki Te Tonga District Māori Council.

== Actions ==
=== Land ===
==== 1987 "Lands" case ====
The council's opposition to the 1986 State Owned Enterprises Act helped create Section 9 of the act: "Nothing in this Act shall permit the Crown to act in a manner that is inconsistent with the principles of the Treaty of Waitangi." It also resulted in the first written version of the treaty principles that outline the doctrine of partnership, protection, consultation, and compensation for Māori. In 1987, the council was the plaintiff in the historic New Zealand Māori Council v Attorney-General case. As a result of the case, the Labour Government was blocked from alienating land in transfers to state-owned enterprises (SOEs) when the resources would be subject to Waitangi Tribunal.

==== 1993 Te Ture Whenua Act ====
The council led the 1993 reform of Māori land which resulted in the Te Ture Whenua Māori Act. The council was also identified as a key stakeholder in the 2016 Te Ture Whenua Bill.

==== 2012 court action ====
In 2012, the council filed an application in the High Court for a judicial review of various government decisions in an attempt to postpone the government's mixed-ownership model policy of partial privatization. In December 2012, the High Court ruled against the Māori Council, saying that selling the assets to private investors would not prevent future Treaty of Waitangi claims. Council lawyer Donna Hall said the decision was not unexpected, but spokesperson Rahui Katene said it was disappointing. Prime Minister John Key described the government's court victory as "crushing".

==== 2013 review claim ====
In September 2013, the council filed a claim with the Waitangi Tribunal over the government's review of the Māori Community Development Act 1962. The review of the act was announced in August 2013 by Minister of Māori Affairs Pita Sharples, and the council claimed that the consultation on the review was inconsistent with the principles of the Treaty of Waitangi. The council argued that the review of the act had been Crown-led, which was inappropriate for a Māori body, and that there should have been direct Crown–Māori negotiations from the beginning. On 8 December 2014, the Waitangi Tribunal released "Whaia te Mana Motuhake / In Pursuit of Mana Motuhake: Report on the Māori Community Development Act Claim", including a series of recommendations for the council and Te Puni Kōkiri (Ministry of Māori Development).

=== Natural resources ===
When the Crown intended to sell forestry assets in the country, the council intervened. The council established the Crown Forestry Rental Trust to assist claimants with research. This protective mechanism prevented the sale of the forests and has resulted in claimants receiving funds.

The council was party to negotiations that led to the 1989 Māori Fisheries Act and the 1992 Sealord settlement, together valued at $700m.

Political representation

The council took the Crown to the Waitangi Tribunal for not upholding the tino rangatiratanga ("self-determination") of Māori. As a result, funds were made available for Māori organisations to enroll Māori ("Māori electoral option"), thereby increasing Māori seats from four to seven.

=== Broadcasting ===
The council held the Crown accountable to its 1993 promise to establish a Māori Television channel. The Māori Television Service now broadcasts over two channels. In 1992, the council took the Crown to the Court of Appeal and then to the Privy Council to appeal the transfer of broadcasting assets. As a result, Te Māngai Pāho (the Māori Broadcast Funding Agency) was created to fund Māori-language programming, including 21 Māori radio stations. Te Māngai Pāho now spends $55 million per year to support Māori-language programming.

=== COVID-19 ===
In 2021, the council criticised the government for its handling of the COVID-19 pandemic.
