= Robin Cooke, Baron Cooke of Thorndon =

New Zealand judge (1926–2006)

The Right Honourable The Lord Cooke of Thorndon ONZ KBE PC QC

President of the Court of Appeal
- In office 1986–1996
- Preceded by: Sir Owen Woodhouse
- Succeeded by: Sir Ivor Richardson

Member of the House of Lords
- Lord Temporal
- Life peerage 3 April 1996 – 30 August 2006

Personal details
- Born: 9 May 1926 Wellington, New Zealand
- Died: 30 August 2006 (aged 80) Wellington, New Zealand
- Spouse: Annette Miller (m. 1952)
- Children: 3 including Francis Cooke
- Parent: Philip Cooke (father)

Robin Brunskill Cooke, Baron Cooke of Thorndon, ONZ, KBE, PC, QC (9 May 1926 – 30 August 2006) was a New Zealand judge and later a British Law Lord and member of the Judicial Committee of the Privy Council. He is widely considered one of New Zealand's most influential jurists, and is the only New Zealand judge to have sat in the House of Lords. He was a Non-Permanent Judge of the Court of Final Appeal of Hong Kong from 1997 to 2006.

== Early life and education ==
The son of the Supreme Court judge Justice Philip Brunskill Cooke MC QC and his wife, Valmai, Lord Cooke was born in Wellington and attended Wanganui Collegiate School. He graduated with an LL.M. from Victoria University College, and subsequently studied at Clare College, Cambridge as a Research Fellow. While on a travelling scholarship, Lord Cooke was awarded an MA in 1954 from Gonville and Caius College, Cambridge and subsequently a PhD in 1955.

In 1952, he married Annette Miller, with whom he had three sons. One of their sons, Francis, was appointed to the High Court in 2018 and the Court of Appeal in 2024.

== Legal career ==
Cooke was admitted to the New Zealand bar in 1950, and was also admitted to the English bar as a barrister of Inner Temple in 1954. He practised law in New Zealand as a barrister for almost twenty years, and was appointed as a Queen's Counsel in 1964. At age 38, that was the youngest appointment of a QC in New Zealand; the young age record had previously been held by his father, who had been appointed aged 43.

In 1972, he was appointed as a Judge of the (former) New Zealand Supreme Court (now High Court). He held this position until 1976 when he was elevated to the New Zealand Court of Appeal (at that time the country's highest local court). In 1986, he was appointed as President of that Court – a position he was to hold for the next 10 years. On his retirement from the Court of Appeal in 1996 Cook was granted a British life peerage as Baron Cooke of Thorndon, (a suburb of Wellington) in New Zealand and of Cambridge in the County of Cambridgeshire, becoming a member of the Appellate Committee of the House of Lords where he sat as a Lord of Appeal (Law Lord) until his retirement in 2001.

He also sat (from time to time) as President in the Courts of Appeal of Samoa, the Cook Islands and Kiribati; as well as being a Non-Permanent Judge on the Hong Kong Court of Final Appeal and a Judge of the Supreme Court of Fiji.

Cooke was the only Commonwealth judge in the past century to sit in the Appellate Committee of the House of Lords on United Kingdom appeals. He adjudicated on nearly a hundred cases in the House of Lords and the Privy Council; his final case before retirement was Delaware v City of Westminster, in October 2001.

Cooke died in Wellington on 30 August 2006. His wife, Annette, Lady Cooke, died in 2024.

== Legal philosophy and influence on the law ==
Cooke is New Zealand's best known jurist, and is regarded as perhaps the finest judge which the country has produced. He is most widely known for his contribution to the development of administrative law (both in New Zealand and internationally) and his influence in the development of legal recognition for the Treaty of Waitangi.

Cooke was a champion of the need to develop independent jurisprudence for New Zealand. In 1956, having recently returned from the United Kingdom, he criticised New Zealand's judiciary for its "unquestioning compliance" with English case law. By 1988, Lord Cooke was pleased to be able to report that "in virtually every major field of law New Zealand law is radically, or at least very considerably, different from English law". This change was thanks in part to his own efforts. Yet Lord Cooke did not believe that different jurisdictions had nothing to learn from each other. Rather, he believed that "[c]ommon denominators may be usefully sought, as long as the process is not compelled from outside and the national ethos is allowed its own weight."

=== Administrative law jurisprudence ===
Lord Cooke took what could be considered a natural law approach to public law, often seeking to assert a right for the courts to intervene where none was prescribed in legislation. In Fraser v State Services Commission he famously made the comment that "it is arguable that some common law rights may go so deep that even Parliament cannot be accepted by the Courts to have destroyed them." This view contradicted the dominant parliamentary supremacy theories of A. V. Dicey, which had guided common law courts since the late 19th century. However, Cooke's position recalled a similar opinion expressed by the famous 17th century English jurist, Sir Edward Coke.

In Bulk Gas Users Group v Attorney-General, the then Justice Cooke delivered the leading judgment of the Court of Appeal. Cooke held that a privative clause in the Commerce Act 1975 did not prevent the courts from reviewing a decision made by the Secretary of Energy. He observed that "the Courts of general jurisdiction will be slow to conclude" that they are not permitted to rule on a question of law. This reluctance to accept the ouster of the court's jurisdiction was characteristic of Cooke's views on the importance of the courts' role in upholding the rule of law.

He took a similar approach in 1985, when he delivered the judgment of the Court of Appeal in the case of Finnigan v New Zealand Rugby Football Union allowing the appeal of lawyers seeking an injunction against the NZRFU's proposed tour of South Africa. The proposed tour followed the controversial 1981 Springbok Tour, and was cancelled after the High Court re-heard the case in light of the Court of Appeal's judgment.

Perhaps the most famous public law case which Cooke decided came before him when he was President of the Court of Appeal. In Simpson v Attorney-General (commonly referred to as Baigent's case), the Court held that it is implicit in the New Zealand Bill of Rights Act 1990 that breaches of human rights by public officials could result in a claim for damages — even though there is no such provision in the Act itself. In the case, the Police had mistakenly carried out a search warrant at the wrong address. Because the occupant of the house was not charged with any crime, there was no obvious remedy for the Police's illegal search (exclusion of improperly obtained evidence being the usual remedy applied in Bill of Rights Act cases). In delivering the leading judgment, President Cooke remarked that "we [the Court] would fail in our duty if we did not give an effective remedy to a person whose legislatively affirmed rights have been infringed".

=== Treaty of Waitangi jurisprudence ===
In 1987, Cooke delivered the judgment of the Court of Appeal in the landmark case of New Zealand Maori Council v Attorney-General, which sought to clarify what Parliament meant by section 9 of the State Owned Enterprises Act 1986. The Act stated "Nothing in this act shall permit the Crown to act in a manner that is inconsistent with the principles of the Treaty of Waitangi", but what those principles might be was left to the courts to decide. The principles elicited by President Cooke gave legal recognition to the special relationship between the Crown and Maori. Cooke held that "the Treaty created an enduring relationship of a fiduciary nature akin to a partnership, each party accepting a positive duty to act in good faith, fairly, reasonably and honourably towards the other". This principle of partnership continues to shape the legal relations between the Crown and Maori to this day.

=== Legal commentary ===
Lord Cooke's often bold views occasionally drew criticism. In one noteworthy example, some of Australia's most senior judges co-wrote the Preface of Meagher, Gummow and Lehane’s Equity, Doctrines and Remedies, where they blamed "Lord Cooke's misguided endeavours" for what they saw as the Court of Appeal's unprincipled decisions concerning the merger of common law and equitable doctrines in New Zealand. The authors went on to remark "[t]hat one man could, in a few years, cause such destruction exposes the fragility of contemporary legal systems and the need for vigilant exposure and rooting out of error". However, not all their colleagues shared such concerns. Justice Kirby (of the High Court of Australia), in his 2008 W A Lee Lecture, noted that Lord Cooke's supposedly "heretical" views had in fact been accepted by many prominent jurists in the United Kingdom, including the House of Lords. He took issue with the tone of the Meagher Preface, remarking that "those familiar with the successive 'rooting out' of heretics in England under the later Tudors will recognise the genre of this denunciatory writing. Burning at the professional stake would seem too kind a fate for such doctrinal rascals."

Cooke himself was described to have a commanding extrajudicial and academic presence. From 1992 until 1996, Cooke was General Editor of The Laws of New Zealand and selected the original authors for the different titles. He was also a continual contributor to legal journals, including the Law Quarterly Review, Cambridge Law Journal and New Zealand Law Journal.

In 1996, Lord Cooke delivered the 47th Hamlyn Lecture Series, entitled Turning Points of the Common Law. In each of his four lectures, he focused on a single major case (covering public law, crime, tort and company law) and the influence of that case on the development of the common law as a whole throughout the Commonwealth.

== Honours and awards ==
- 1955: Yorke Prize
- 1977: Knight Bachelor in the 1977 New Year Honours
- 1977: Appointed to the Privy Council of the United Kingdom
- 1977: Queen Elizabeth II Silver Jubilee Medal
- 1986: Knight Commander of the Order of the British Empire (KBE) in the 1986 Queen's Birthday Honours
- 1982: Honorary Fellow of Gonville and Caius College, Cambridge
- 1985: Honorary Bencher of Inner Temple
- 1989: Honorary Doctorate of Laws (LLD) from the Victoria University of Wellington
- 1990: New Zealand 1990 Commemoration Medal
- 1990: Honorary Doctorate of Laws (LLD) from the University of Cambridge
- 1991: Honorary Doctorate of Civil Law (DCL) from the University of Oxford
- 1993: Appointed to the International Commission of Jurists
- 1996: Created a Life Peer
- 2002: Additional Member of the Order of New Zealand in the 2002 Queen's Birthday and Golden Jubilee Honours

Since 2002 the Law School of Victoria University, Wellington has held an annual lecture in his honour, predominately in the area of constitutional and administrative law.

== Cases, articles and books ==
Notable cases

- Finnigan v New Zealand Rugby Football Union [1985] 2 NZLR 159
- New Zealand Maori Council v Attorney-General [1987] 1 NZLR 641
- R v Baker [1989] 1 NZLR 738
- Trevor Ivory Ltd v Anderson [1992] 2 NZLR 517
- Taylor v New Zealand Poultry Board [1984] 1 NZLR 394
- Flickinger v Crown Colony of Hong Kong [1991] 1 NZLR 439
- Bulk Gas Users Group v Attorney-General [1983] NZLR 129
- Fraser v State Services Commission [1984] 1 NZLR 116
- Horsburgh v NZ Meat Processors Industrial Union of Workers [1988] 1 NZLR 698
- Taupo Borough Council v Birnie [1978] 2 NZLR 397

Notable articles

- Cooke, Robin "An Impossible Distinction" (1991) 107 Law Quarterly Review 46
- Cooke, Robin "The Supreme Tribunal of the British Commonwealth?" (1956) 32 NZLJ 233
- Cooke, Robin "Fundamentals" [1988] NZLJ 158
- Cooke, Robin "The Struggle for Simplicity in Administrative Law" in Michael Taggart (ed) Judicial Review of Administrative Action in the 1980s: Problems and Prospects (Oxford University Press, Auckland, 1986)
- Cooke, Robin "Fairness" (1989) VUWLR 421
- Cooke, Robin "Divergences – England, Australia and New Zealand" [1983] NZLJ 297
- Lord Cooke "The Dream of an International Common Law" in Cheryl Saunders (ed) Courts of Final Jurisdiction: The Mason Court in Australia (Federation Press, Sydney, 1996)
- Lord Cooke "The Common Law Through Commonwealth Eyes" (1998) 2 Inter Alia 45
- Cooke, Robin "The New Zealand National Legal Identity" (1987) 3 Canta LR 171
- Cooke, Robin "The Changing Face of Administrative Law" [1960] NZLJ 128
- Cooke, Robin "The Harkness Henry Lecture: the Challenge of Treaty of Waitangi Jurisprudence" (1994) 2 Waikato L Rev 1

Books

- Cooke, Robin (1969). Portrait of a Profession: The Centennial Book of the New Zealand Law Society. Wellington: Reed Publishing.
- Cooke, Robin (1997). The Hamlyn Lectures: Turning Points of the Common Law. London: Sweet and Maxwell.

== Coat of arms ==
Coat of arms of Robin Cooke, Baron Cooke of Thorndon
Crest In front of a black robin counter statant a black robin statant Proper. Torse Sable and Argent Escutcheon Sable on a cross engrailed Or between four volcanoes Argent inflamed Or a cross Ermine. Supporters On the dexter a mid-nineteenth century Captain in the Royal Navy Proper and on the sinister a Maori warrior Proper cloaked skirted and holding in the exterior hand a spear Or and adorned with two head feathers Argent."The Arms of Baron Cooke of Thorndon". The New Zealand Armorist: The Journal of the Heraldry Society of New Zealand. 64 (Spring 1997): 16–17. 1997. Motto Pro Aequitate Dicere (To speak in favour of equity)

== See also ==
- List of King's and Queen's Counsel in New Zealand

Legal offices
Preceded by Sir Owen Woodhouse	President of the Court of Appeal of New Zealand; 1976–1996	Succeeded by Sir Ivor Richardson
New creation	Justice of the Court of Final Appeal of Hong Kong; 1997–2006	Unknown
