= New Zealand foreshore and seabed controversy =

Indigenous rights controversy

The New Zealand foreshore and seabed controversy is a debate about ownership of the country's foreshore and seabed, with many Māori groups claiming that Māori have a rightful claim to title (indigenous title). These claims are based around historical possession and the Treaty of Waitangi. The Foreshore and Seabed Act 2004 deemed the title to be held by the Crown. Some sections of the act came into force on 17 January 2005. It was repealed and replaced by the Marine and Coastal Area (Takutai Moana) Act 2011.

== Origins ==
=== Ngati Apa v Attorney-General ===
In 1997, an application was made to the Māori Land Court requesting, amongst other matters, that "the foreshore and seabed of the Marlborough Sounds, extending the limits of New Zealand's territorial sea" be defined as Māori customary land under the Te Ture Whenua Māori Act 1993. The Māori Land Court determined that it could consider the issue, but was overruled by the High Court. On 19 June 2003, New Zealand's Court of Appeal ruled in Ngati Apa v Attorney-General, amongst other matters, that:

1. "The definition of 'land' in Te Ture Whenua Maori Act 1993 did not necessarily exclude foreshore and seabed";
2. "The title vested in the Crown was radical title which was not inconsistent with native title";
3. Various Acts had influence over but did not extinguish property rights;
4. The Maori Land Court had jurisdiction to determine "an investigation of the title to the land ... under s 132 and an order determining the relative interests of the owners of the land".

=== In Re the Ninety-Mile Beach ===
The Court of Appeal overturned a line of precedent dating back to the 1877 decision in Wi Parata v Bishop of Wellington, and affirmed by the New Zealand Court of Appeal in the 1963 In Re the Ninety-Mile Beach decision. These early decisions held that because of circumstances unique to New Zealand, Māori land ties were so weak that they could be extinguished through such indirect routes as unrelated phrases in legislation or through the Māori Land Court's investigation of dry land adjoining the foreshore.

In its ruling, the Court of Appeal found that "native property rights are not to be extinguished by a side wind.... The need for 'clear and plain' extinguishment is well established and is not met in this case. In the Ninety-Mile Beach case, the Court did not recognise that principle of interpretation". The ruling was foreshadowed by academic work during the late 1980s and 1990s, which argued that the Ninety Mile Beach case was wrongly decided.

=== Initial responses ===
The ruling granted only the right to pursue establishing an interest. Experts such as Paul McHugh of Cambridge University stated that this was unlikely to result in full exclusive ownership, but these assurances were not strong enough to counter the perception that the door was now open for Māori to claim title to the entire coastline of New Zealand through the Māori Land Court. The prospect of a successful claim was reported as having created considerable hostility in many sectors of society as New Zealand has a strong tradition of public access to beaches and waterways and this was perceived as being under threat. The prime minister, Helen Clark of the Labour Party, announced that the government would legislate to ensure public ownership of the foreshore and seabed.

At the same time, however, the government was strongly attacked by the opposition National Party, led by Don Brash. In sharp contrast to Te Ope Mana a Tai, the National Party claimed that the government's proposals were too favourable towards Māori. While the government's plan did indeed vest ownership in the state, they also incorporated provision for Māori to be consulted over matters relating to the foreshore and seabed. The National Party claimed that Māori were to be given too much control, and that the government was giving rights to Māori over and above those possessed by other New Zealanders.

Once the Government's policy framework was released, the Waitangi Tribunal held an urgent inquiry into the government policy. The hearing took place over six days in late January 2004, and a report was issued four weeks later. The tribunal issued a report that was highly critical of the Crown's approach. The Government response was equally sharp and critical, accusing the tribunal of 'implicitly' rejecting the principle of parliamentary sovereignty. The Attorney-General, taking a more middle ground, conceded that the policy was prima facie discriminatory, but concluded that this infringement was "demonstrably justifiable in a free and democratic society" under section 5 of the New Zealand Bill of Rights Act 1990. The Human Rights Commission took another view, arguing that the legislation was discriminatory and not justified by section 5.

== 2004 debate ==
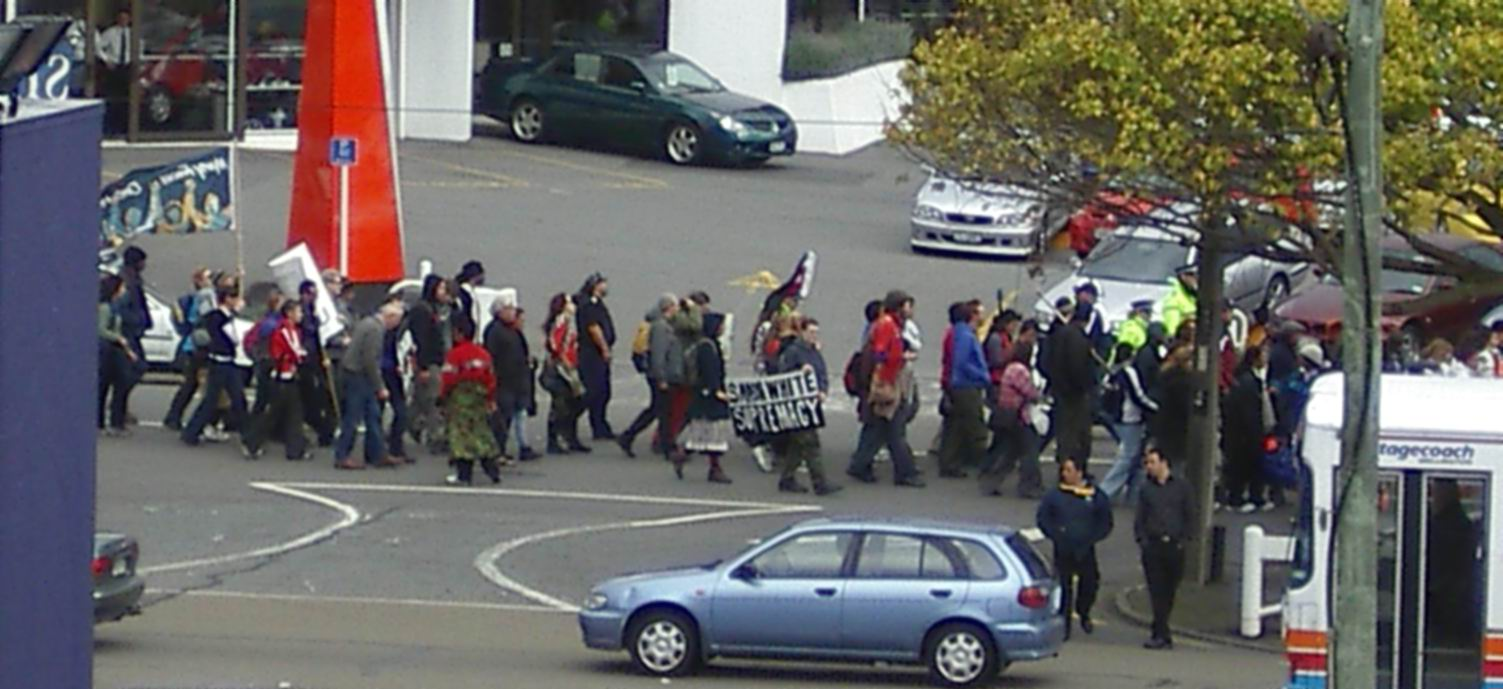
The hīkoi on Cambridge Terrace, heading to Parliament

Although under attack from both sides, the government chose to press forward with its legislation, asserting that what it called its "middle way" was the only means of satisfactorily resolving the controversy. Criticism of the government, both from Māori and from opposition parties, continued to intensify, and the government began to lose ground in opinion polls.

On 27 January 2004, Brash delivered a speech at Orewa that was highly critical of the government's policy towards Māori. Brash said that the government was showing strong favouritism to Māori, both in the foreshore and seabed debate and in many other areas of government policy. Brash's speech was condemned both by the government and by many Māori groups, but met with widespread approval from many other sectors of New Zealand society. This support was boosted by the successful 'iwi/Kiwi' billboard campaign which followed Brash's speech. These billboards framed the foreshore debate as the Labour Party's attempt to restrict public access to beaches, while the National Party would protect this aspect of the 'Kiwi way of life'. The speech resulted in a surge in support for the National Party. From 28% in the polls a month before the speech, the party jumped to 45% two weeks after it: ten points ahead of the Labour Party.

The government was also facing serious internal debate over its proposed legislation. Many of the party's Māori MPs were deeply unhappy with the government's plans, and raised the possibility of breaking ranks to oppose the legislation in Parliament. This left the government unsure of whether it had a sufficient number of votes to pass its legislation through Parliament. In theory, the government had a narrow majority willing to support its proposed bill, with Labour, the Progressives, and United Future all prepared to vote in favour. If two of Labour's Māori MPs were to vote against the bill, however, it would fail. Moreover, any attempt to make the bill more favourable to these MPs would risk losing the support of United Future.

On 8 April 2004, it was announced that the centrist-nationalist New Zealand First party would give its support to the legislation. New Zealand First's price for this support was that ownership of the seabed and foreshore would be vested solely in the Crown, ending the concept of "public domain" (vesting ownership in the public at large rather than in the state) that United Future had promoted. United Future withdrew its support for the legislation, but New Zealand First provided sufficient votes to make this irrelevant. It is believed that Helen Clark preferred United Future's "public domain", and this was acknowledged by United Future leader Peter Dunne, but United Future could not provide enough votes to guarantee the bill's passage, forcing Labour to seek support elsewhere.

One of the strongest critics of the bill within the Labour Party was Tariana Turia, a junior minister. Turia indicated on a number of occasions that she might vote against the government's bill, but for a considerable time refused to give a final decision. It was made clear that voting against a government bill was "incompatible" with serving as a minister, and that doing so would result in Turia's dismissal from that role. Turia was encouraged to either abstain or simply be absent when the vote was taken. On 30 April, however, Turia announced that she would vote against the legislation, and would resign (effective 17 May 2004) from the Labour Party to contest a by-election in her electorate. She was dismissed from her ministerial post by the Prime Minister the same day. Another Labour MP, Nanaia Mahuta, eventually decided that she would also vote against the bill, but chose not to leave the Labour Party. Mahuta had no ministerial post to be dismissed from.

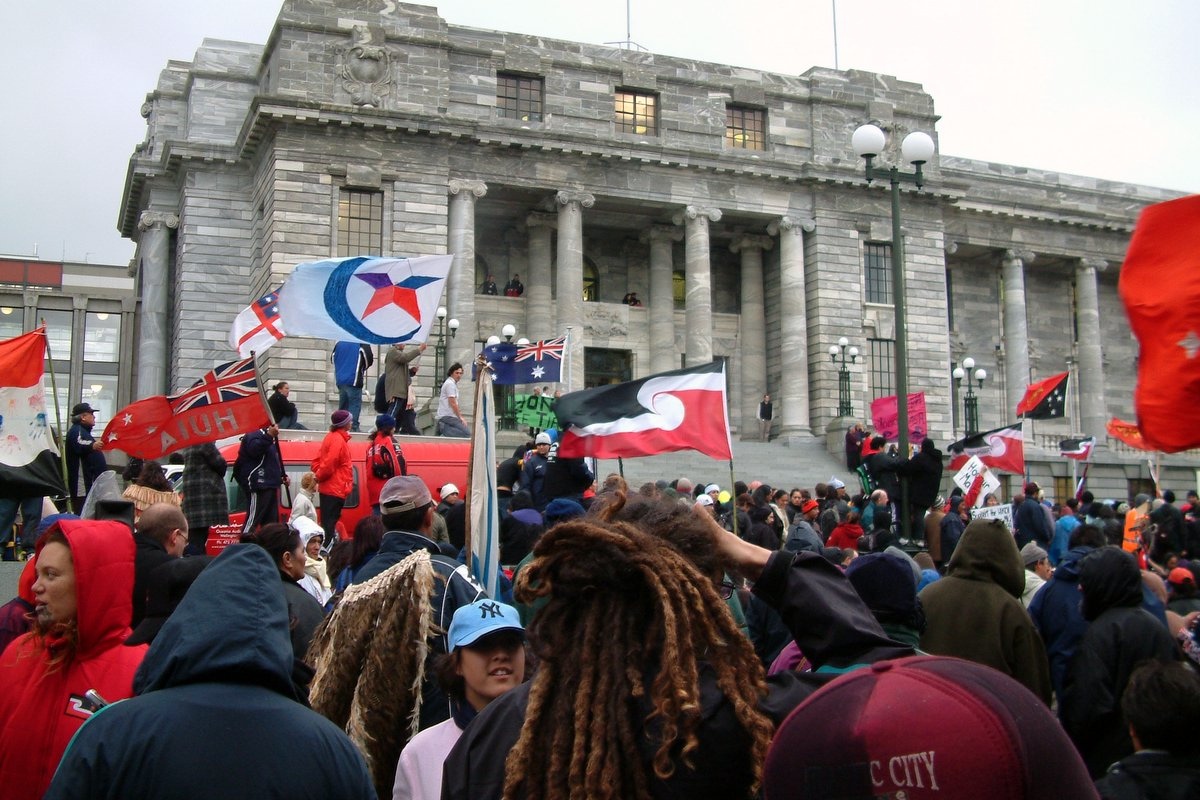
The hīkoi outside Parliament House

On 5 May 2004, a hīkoi (a long walk or march – in this case, a protest march) arrived in Wellington. It had begun in Northland thirteen days earlier, picking up supporters as they drove to the capital. The hīkoi, which some estimated to contain fifteen thousand people by the time it reached Parliament, strongly opposed the government's plans, and was highly supportive of Turia's decision.

Turia and her allies, believing that the time was right for an independent Māori political vehicle, established a new Māori Party. Many of Turia's supporters, such as Mana Motuhake leader Willie Jackson and Māori academic Pita Sharples, claimed that Māori who formerly supported Labour would flock to the new party en masse. On the other hand, other commentators pointed to a poor track record for Māori parties in the past, and said that it would be difficult to unite diverse Māori opinion into a single group.

On 18 November 2004, Tim Selwyn put an axe through a window of the electorate office of Helen Clark, an act he described as a protest against Helen Clark's handling of the issue. On 18 July 2006, he was sentenced to two months imprisonment for the axe attack.

== Foreshore and Seabed Act 2004 ==
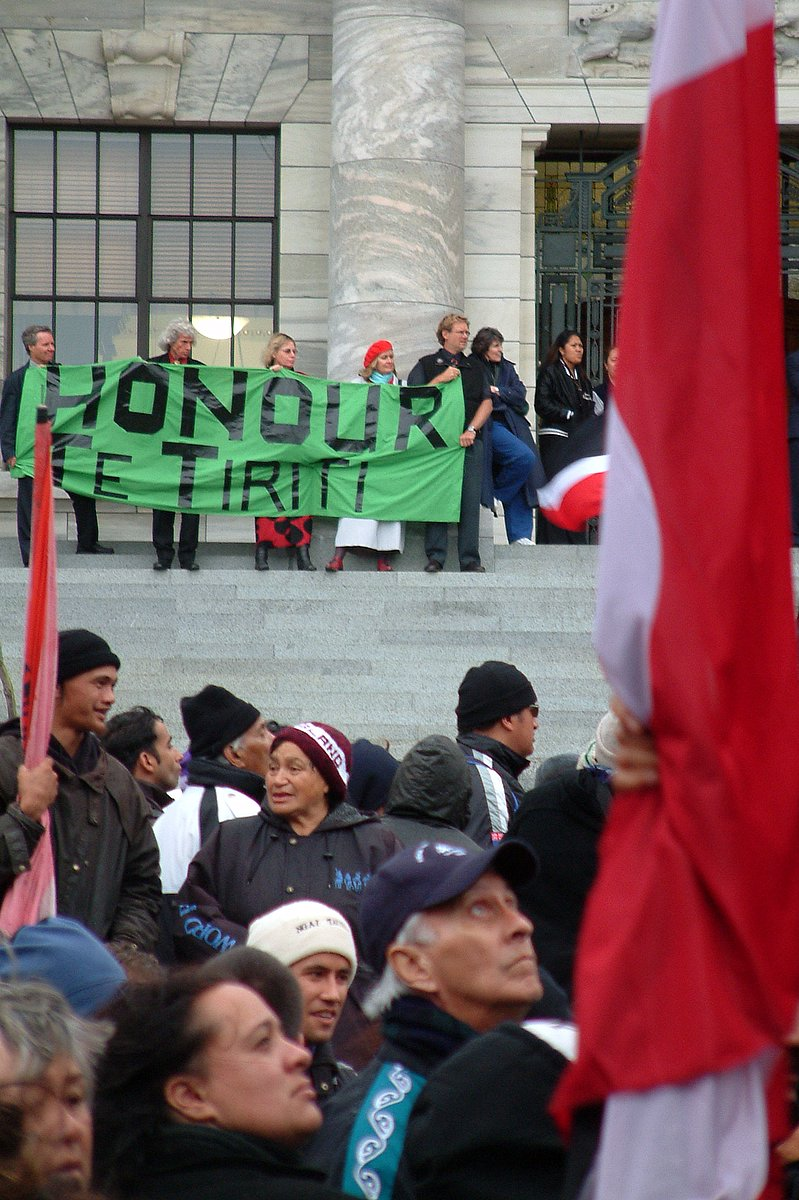
Green Party MPs at the hīkoi/protest with a banner reading "Honour Te Tiriti".

On 18 November 2004, the Labour–Progressive government passed the Foreshore and Seabed Act 2004, which declared that the land in question was owned by the Crown. Māori could, however, apply for "guardianship" of certain areas. The act was highly contentious.

The government's foreshore and seabed bill passed its first vote in Parliament on 7 May 2004, backed by Labour, the Progressives, and New Zealand First. The National Party opposed the bill, saying that it gave too much control to Māori, United Future opposed it due to the removal of the public domain concept and ACT opposed it on the grounds of the legislation being retrospective, that it was a denial of property rights (in this case Māori property rights), and that it was an unwarranted incursion by the Crown into areas that were specifically tikanga Māori. The Greens, another party in Parliament to take a position similar to that of the Māori protesters, also voted against the bill, saying that it overrode Māori rights and offered no guarantee that the land would not later be sold. Turia and Mahuta both voted against the bill. The first vote tally was 65 in favour and 55 against. Deputy Prime Minister Michael Cullen, told Parliament that the bill "safeguards the seabed and foreshore for everyone", protecting the rights of both Māori and non-Māori. Opposition to the bill remained strong, however, and protests and criticism continued as the government's legislation progressed.

The bill's passage through its first vote meant that it was then considered by a special select committee of Parliament, which heard public submissions on the matter. The select committee having allowed six months for submissions, reported back to the parliament in November that they had been unable to agree on a position and were therefore reporting back the bill with no recommendations whatsoever. The bill, slightly amended by the Government itself, passed its second vote on 17 November 2004 by the same margin as in the first vote. It was then considered by a Committee of the House (with Parliament sitting under urgency). It finally received its third vote on 18 November 2004. The final vote tally was 66 in favour and 54 against – Mahuta, who had previously voted against, this time voted in favour.

On 15 December, the legislation was modified slightly after it was realised that as it was written, the act nationalised all council-owned land reclaimed from the sea. This included areas such as Auckland's Britomart and Wellington's waterfront. This was not part of the intention of the act.

The United Nations Committee on the Elimination of Racial Discrimination, after being asked by Te Runanga o Ngāi Tahu to consider the legislation, issued a report on 12 March 2005 stating that the foreshore and seabed legislation discriminates against Māori by extinguishing the possibility of establishing Māori customary title over the foreshore and seabed, and by not providing a means of redress. Turia and the Māori Party claimed this as a significant victory, although the report did not prompt any change in government policy.

== Aftermath ==
The foreshore and seabed issue, as part of the larger race relations debate, was one of the most significant points of contention in New Zealand politics at the time, and remains a significant issue for many people. The Labour government's popularity was severely damaged by the affair, although subsequent polls showed that it recovered its support and Labour was re-elected for a third term in the 2005 election.

While the act was widely criticised by Māori, some iwi chose to negotiate agreement within the bounds of the act. The first agreement made through the act was ratified by Ngāti Porou and the Crown in October 2008 (see below).

=== United Nations special rapporteur ===
In November 2005, following government criticism of the report issued by the UN Committee on the Elimination of Racial Discrimination (UNCERD), special rapporteur Professor Stavenhagen, a Mexican researcher who reports to UNCERD, arrived in New Zealand at the invitation of the Government. He attended four hui and heard severe criticism of the government. He also met with Deputy Prime Minister Michael Cullen who crafted the foreshore law. While the foreshore and seabed issue was central to his visit, discussions also related to Treaty of Waitangi settlements, and economic, social and cultural rights generally. On 25 November 2005 he issued a statement which noted that "[w]hile the standard of living of the Māori of New Zealand has improved and is better than that of indigenous peoples in poorer countries, there is widespread concern that the gap in social and economic conditions is actually growing larger and an increasing proportion of Māori are being left behind". His final report was completed in March 2006. It was highly critical of the Government in a number of areas, including the Foreshore and Seabed Act, which it recommended should be repealed or significantly amended. The Government response to this further criticism was again negative describing Professor Stavenhagen's report as "disappointing, unbalanced and narrow".

=== Member's bill ===
In October 2006, Turia introduced a member's bill designed to repeal the Foreshore and Seabed Act. In recreating the legal status before the Foreshore and Seabed Act was passed, however, the bill was reported to vest ownership of the foreshore and seabed in the Crown. Turia denied that her bill would do anything but repeal the Foreshore and Seabed Act 2004 in its entirety and described Labour's descriptions as "scaremongering".

=== First foreshore and seabed agreement signed ===
The first foreshore and seabed agreement was ratified on 31 October 2008. The agreement was negotiated between people of the Ngāti Porou area on the East Cape and the Crown (effectively the New Zealand government). About 200 people representing Ngāti Porou were present to witness the signing of the deed. The deed protects customary rights of local iwi and retains wider public access to Ngāti Porou coastal areas.

== Repeal and replacement ==
Following the formation of the Fifth National Government in November 2008, the Green Party continued to call for repeal of the Foreshore and Seabed Act 2004. National front bencher Christopher Finlayson, sworn in as Minister for Treaty of Waitangi Negotiations in November 2008, described the act as "discriminatory and unfair". Commentary at the time of his appointment suggested the Foreshore and Seabed Act would be reviewed under a National government.

On 14 June 2010, Prime Minister John Key announced that he would be repeal the Foreshore and Seabed Act. The proposed replacement law in turn created opposition from both sides. Some Māori argued that the bill was a fraud as essentially no Māori groups would meet the test for increased rights to the foreshore, while others, such as the Coastal Coalition, felt that the bill risks free access to coastal areas for a large part of New Zealanders.

In 2011, Parliament passed the Marine and Coastal Area (Takutai Moana) Act 2011, which replaced Crown ownership of the foreshore and seabed with a "no ownership" regime. The MACA Act also allowed Māori to apply to the courts or Crown for customary rights and ownership over certain areas provided they did not interfere with existing rights and activities such as fishing, aquaculture and public access.

== 2024–2025 customary marine title controversy ==
On 21 May 2024, Treaty Negotiations Minister Paul Goldsmith and Oceans Fisheries Minister Shane Jones met with seafood industry representatives to discuss customary marine titles. According to meeting notes, both ministers were sympathetic to industry concerns about the Marine and Coastal Area (Takutai Moana) Act 2011 and supported proposed law changes to reduce the 100% of coastline subject to customary title to 5%, which would make it harder for Māori to claim foreshore and sea customary title. Following the meeting, the Government announced changes to foreshore and seabed legislation covering Māori customary titles. The meeting was also attended by Te Arawhiti (Office for Māori Crown Relations) deputy secretary Tui Marsh and officials from the Ministry for Primary Industries.

In late July 2024, Goldsmith confirmed that the National-led coalition government would disregard a 2023 New Zealand Court of Appeal ruling that lowered the threshold for proving Māori customary marine title claims. Goldsmith announce that the Government would amend section 58 of the Marine and Coastal Area (Takutai Moana) Act 2011 to require marine title claimants to prove they had continual exclusive use and ownership of the area since 1840. This law change was part of National's coalition agreement with NZ First. In response, Te Pāti Māori MP Tākuta Ferris accused the Government of taking away Māori rights and warned that the Government should expect protests.

On 26 August 2024, the Waitangi Tribunal began holding an urgent inquiry into the Government's plans to change the law to tighten the threshold for Māori customary marine title claims. On the first two days, the Tribunal heard testimony from Treaty of Waitangi lawyer Tom Bennion and Te Arawhiti deputy secretary Tui Marsh. On 13 September, the Tribunal released its initial report into the proposed changes to the Marine and Coastal Area (Takutai Moana) Act 2011. It criticised the Government for ignoring official advice, failing to consult Māori and for breaching several principles including active protection and good governance.

On 24 September 2024, the Government's Marine and Coastal Area (Takutai Moana) (Customary Marine Title) Amendment Bill passed its first reading on 24 September 2024 and was referred to the justice select committee. Despite dissent from the Labour and Green parties, the committee recommended that the bill proceed through the legislative process on 3 December 2024.

In October 2024, the Attorney-General Judith Collins appealed the Court of Appeal's 2023 decision to lower the threshold for proving Māori customary foreshore and seabed claims to the Supreme Court of New Zealand. On 2 December, the Supreme Court upheld the Attorney-General's appeal, ruling that the lower court had erred in its approach to interpreting the threshold within the framework of the Marine and Coastal Area (Takutai Moana) Act 2011.

On 5 August 2025, Goldsmith confirmed that the Government would proceed with the MACA Amendment Bill despite a Supreme Court ruling questioning the necessity of the law. The Māori tribe Ngai Tahu and the opposition Labour Party criticised the proposed bill, saying that it would make it harder for Māori to argue for their customary rights in court. On 22 October, the Government's Marine and Coastal Area (Takutai Moana) (Customary Marine Title) Amendment Act 2025 passed its third reading, becoming law. The bill was supported by the governing National, ACT and New Zealand First parties but was opposed by the opposition Labour, Green parties and Te Pāti Māori, which vowed to repeal the legislation if they formed the next government. In response, Te Pāti Māori MPs Debbie Ngarewa-Packer and Ferris burnt a copy of the MACA bill in protest.

== See also ==
- Coastline of New Zealand
- Māori protest movement
- Coastal Coalition
- Tidelands
