= Aboriginal title =

Concept in common law of indigenous land rights persisting after colonization

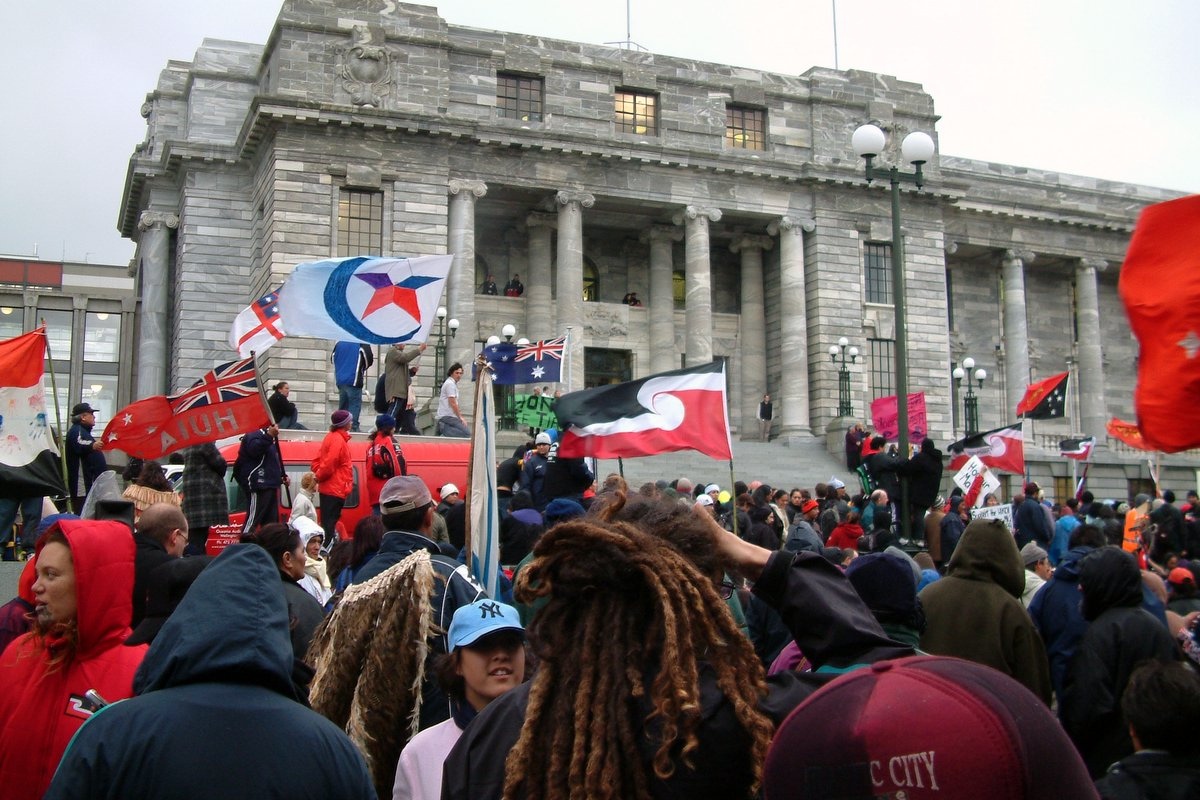
Protests against the Foreshore and Seabed Act 2004, which extinguished claims to aboriginal title to the foreshore and seabeds in New Zealand

Aboriginal title is a common law doctrine that the land rights of indigenous peoples to customary tenure persist after the assumption of sovereignty to that land by another colonising state. The requirements of proof for the recognition of aboriginal title, the content of aboriginal title, the methods of extinguishing aboriginal title, and the availability of compensation in the case of extinguishment vary significantly by jurisdiction. Nearly all jurisdictions are in agreement that aboriginal title is inalienable, and that it may be held either individually or collectively.

Aboriginal title is also referred to as indigenous title, native title (in Australia), original Indian title (in the United States), and customary title (in New Zealand). Aboriginal title jurisprudence is related to indigenous rights, influencing and influenced by non-land issues, such as whether the government owes a fiduciary duty to indigenous peoples. While the judge-made doctrine arises from customary international law, it has been codified nationally by legislation, treaties, and constitutions.

Aboriginal title was first acknowledged in the early 19th century, in decisions in which indigenous peoples were not a party. Significant aboriginal title litigation resulting in victories for indigenous peoples did not arise until recent decades. The majority of court cases have been litigated in Australia, Canada, Malaysia, New Zealand, and the United States. Aboriginal title is an important area of comparative law, with many cases being cited as persuasive authority across jurisdictions. Legislated Indigenous land rights often follow from the recognition of native title.

== British colonial legacy ==
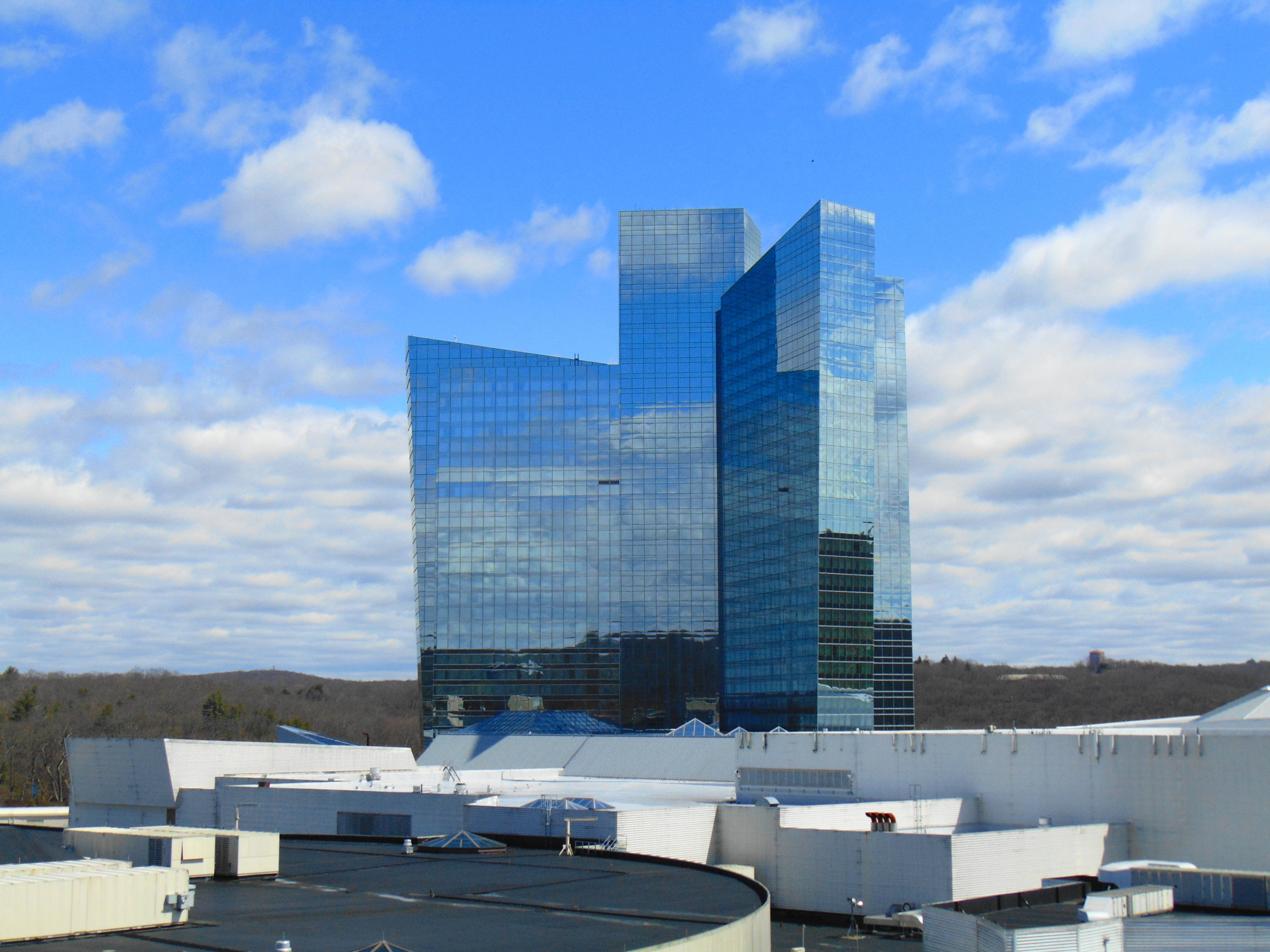
The Mohegan Sun casino commemorates the site of the world's first common-law indigenous land rights case, decided in 1773.

Aboriginal title arose at the intersection of three common law doctrines articulated by the Judicial Committee of the Privy Council: the Act of State doctrine, the Doctrine of Continuity, and the Recognition Doctrine. The Act of State doctrine held that the Crown could confiscate or extinguish real or personal property rights in the process of conquering, without scrutiny from any British court, but could not perpetrate an Act of State against its own subjects. The Doctrine of Continuity presumed that the Crown did not intend to extinguish private property upon acquiring sovereignty, and thus that pre-existing interests were enforceable under British law. Its mirror was the Recognition Doctrine, which held that private property rights were presumed to be extinguished in the absence of explicit recognition.

In 1608, the same year in which the Doctrine of Continuity emerged, Edward Coke delivered a famous dictum in Calvin's Case (1608) that the laws of all non-Christians would be abrogated upon their conquest. Coke's view was not put into practice, but was rejected by Lord Mansfield in 1774. The two doctrines were reconciled, with the Doctrine of Continuity prevailing in nearly all situations (except, for example, public property of the predecessor state) in Oyekan v Adele (1957).

The first Indigenous land rights case under the common law, Mohegan Indians v. Connecticut, was litigated from 1705 to 1773, with the Privy Council affirming without opinion the judgement of a non-judicial tribunal. (Note: For modern litigation over the same land, see Mohegan Tribe v. Connecticut, 483 F. Supp. 597 (D. Conn. 1980), aff'd, 638 F.2d 612 (2d Cir. 1980), cert. denied 452 U.S. 968, on remand, 528 F. Supp. 1359 (D. Conn. 1982).) Other important Privy Council decisions include In re Southern Rhodesia (1919) rejected a claim for aboriginal title, writing that:

Some tribes are so low in the scale of social organization that their usages and conceptions of rights and duties are not to be reconciled with the institutions or the legal ideas of civilized society. Such a gulf cannot be bridged.

Amodu Tijani v. Southern Nigeria (Secretary) (1921). laid the basis for several elements of the modern aboriginal title doctrine, upholding a customary land claim and urging the need to "study of the history of the particular community and its usages in each case." Subsequently, the Privy Council issued many opinions confirming the existence of aboriginal title, and upholding customary land claims; many of these arose in African colonies. Modern decisions have heaped criticism upon the views expressed in Southern Rhodesia.

== Doctrinal overview ==
=== Recognition ===
The requirements for establishing an aboriginal title to the land vary across countries, but generally speaking, the aboriginal claimant must establish (exclusive) occupation (or possession) from a long time ago, generally before the assertion of sovereignty, and continuity to the present day.

=== Content ===
Aboriginal title does not constitute allodial title or radical title in any jurisdiction. Instead, its content is generally described as a usufruct, i.e. a right to use, although in practice this may mean anything from a right to use land for specific, enumerated purposes, or a general right to use which approximates fee simple.

It is common ground among the relevant jurisdictions that aboriginal title is inalienable, in the sense that it cannot be transferred except to the general government (known, in many of the relevant jurisdictions, as "the Crown")—although Malaysia allows aboriginal title to be sold between indigenous peoples, unless contrary to customary law. Especially in Australia, the content of aboriginal title varies with the degree to which claimants are able to satisfy the standard of proof for recognition. In particular, the content of aboriginal title may be tied to the traditions and customs of the indigenous peoples, and only accommodate growth and change to a limited extent.

=== Extinguishment ===
Aboriginal title can be extinguished by the general government, but again, the requirement to do this varies by country. Some require the legislature to be explicit when it does this, others hold that extinguishment can be inferred from the government's treatment of the land. In Canada, the Crown cannot extinguish aboriginal title without the explicit prior informed consent of the proper aboriginal title holders. New Zealand formerly required consent, but today requires only a justification, akin to a public purpose requirement.

Jurisdictions differ on whether the state is required to pay compensation upon extinguishing aboriginal title. Theories for the payment of compensation include the right to property, as protected by constitutional or common law, and the breach of a fiduciary duty.

== Percentage of land ==
- Native title in Australia - 8,099,264 square kilometres (3,127,143 sq mi) (50.2% of the area of the country's land and waters) as of 2023
- Indian reserves in Canada - 28,000 square kilometres (11,000 sq mi) (0.2804% of the country's land area)
- Native Community Lands in Bolivia - 168,000 square kilometres (65,000 sq mi) (15% of the country's land area)
- Indigenous territories in Brazil - 1,105,258 square kilometres (426,742 sq mi) (13% of the country's land area)
- Indigenous territories in Colombia - 1,141,748 square kilometres (440,831 sq mi) (31.5% of the country's land area)
- Indian reservations in the United States - 227,000 square kilometres (88,000 sq mi) (2.308% of the country's land area)

== History by jurisdiction ==
=== Australia ===
Australia did not experience native title litigation until the 1970s, when Indigenous Australians (both Aboriginal and Torres Strait Islander people) became more politically active, after being included in the Australian citizenry as a result of the 1967 referendum. (Note: Several earlier cases tangentially involved issues of native title: Attorney-General v Brown (1847) 1 Legge 312; 2 SCR (NSW) App 30; Cooper v Stuart [1889] UKLawRpAC 7, (1889) 14 App Cas 286 (3 April 1889), Privy Council (on appeal from NSW); Williams v Attorney General (NSW) [1913] HCA 33, (1913) 16 CLR 404, High Court (Australia); Randwick Corporation v Rutledge [1959] HCA 63, (1959) 102 CLR 54, High Court (Australia); Wade v New South Wales Rutile Mining Co Pty Ltd [1969] HCA 28, (1969) 121 CLR 177, High Court (Australia).) In 1971, Blackburn J of the Supreme Court of the Northern Territory rejected the concept in Milirrpum v Nabalco Pty Ltd (the "Gove land rights case"). The Aboriginal Land Rights Commission was established in 1973 in the wake of Milirrpum. Paul Coe, in Coe v Commonwealth (1979), attempted (unsuccessfully) to bring a class action on behalf of all Aborigines claiming all of Australia. The Aboriginal Land Rights Act 1976, established a statutory procedure that returned approximately 40% of the Northern Territory to Aboriginal ownership; the Anangu Pitjantjatjara Yankunytjatjara Land Rights Act 1981, had a similar effect in South Australia.

The High Court of Australia, after paving the way in Mabo No 1 by striking down a State statute under the Racial Discrimination Act 1975, overruled Milirrpum in Mabo v Queensland (No 2) (1992). Mabo No 2, rejecting terra nullius, held that native title exists (6–1) and is extinguishable by the sovereign (7–0), without compensation (4–3). In the wake of the decision, the Australian Parliament passed the Native Title Act 1993 (NTA), codifying the doctrine and establishing the National Native Title Tribunal (NNTT). Western Australia v Commonwealth upheld the NTA and struck down a conflicting Western Australia statute.

In 1996, the High Court held that pastoral leases, which cover nearly half of Australia, do not extinguish native title in Wik Peoples v Queensland. In response, Parliament passed the Native Title Amendment Act 1998 (the "Ten Point Plan"), extinguishing a variety of Aboriginal land rights and giving state governments the ability to follow suit.

Western Australia v Ward (2002) held that native title is a bundle of rights, which may be extinguished one by one, for example, by a mining lease. Yorta Yorta v Victoria (2002), an appeal from the first native title claim to go to trial since the Native Title Act, adopted strict requirements of continuity of traditional laws and customs for native title claims to succeed.

=== Belize ===
In A-G for British Honduras v Bristowe (1880), the Privy Council held that the property rights of British subjects who had been living in Belize under Spanish rule with limited property rights, were enforceable against the Crown, and had been upgraded to fee simple during the gap between Spanish and British sovereignty. This decision did not involve indigenous peoples, but was an important example of the key doctrines that underlie aboriginal title.

In 1996, the Toledo Maya Cultural Council (TMCC) and the Toledo Alcaldes Association (TAA) filed a claim against the government of Belize in the Belize Supreme Court, but the Court failed to act on the claim. The Maya peoples of the Toledo District filed a complaint with the Inter-American Commission on Human Rights (IACHR), which sided with the Maya in 2004 and stated that the failure of the government of Belize to demarcate and title the Maya cultural lands was a violation of the right to property in Article XXIII of the American Declaration. In 2007, Chief Justice Abdulai Conteh ruled in favor of the Maya communities of Conejo and Santa Cruz, citing the IACHR judgement and key precedents from other common law jurisdictions. The government entered into negotiations with the Maya communities, but ultimately refused to enforce the judgement.

In 2008, The TMCC and TAA, and many individual alcaldes, filed a representative action on behalf of all the Maya communities of the Toledo District, and on 28 June 2010, CJ Conteh ruled in favor of the claimants, declaring that Maya customary land tenure exists in all the Maya villages of the Toledo District, and gives rise to collective and individual property rights under sections 3(d) and 17 of the Belize Constitution.

=== Botswana ===
A Botswana High Court recognized aboriginal title in Sesana and Others v Attorney General (2006), a case brought by named plaintiff Roy Sesana, which held that the San have the right to reside in the Central Kalahari Game Reserve (CKGR), which was violated by their 2001 eviction. The decision quoted Mabo and other international case law, and based the right on the San's occupation of their traditional lands from time immemorial. The court described the right as a "right to use and occupy the lands" rather than a right of ownership. The government has interpreted the ruling very narrowly and has allowed only a small number of San to re-enter the CKGR.

=== Canada ===
Aboriginal title has been recognized in Common Law in Canada since the Privy Council, in St. Catharines Milling v. The Queen (1888), characterized it as a personal usufruct at the pleasure of the Queen. This case did not involve indigenous parties, but rather was a lumber dispute between the provincial government of Ontario and the federal government of Canada. St. Catharines was decided in the wake of the Indian Act (1876), which laid out an assimilationist policy towards the Aboriginal peoples in Canada (First Nations, Inuit, and Métis). It allowed provinces to abrogate treaties (until 1951), and, from 1927, made it a federal crime to prosecute First Nation claims in court, raise money, or organize to pursue such claims.

St. Catharines was more or less the prevailing law until Calder v. British Columbia (Attorney General) (1973). All seven of the judges in Calder agreed that the claimed Aboriginal title existed, and did not solely depend upon the Royal Proclamation of 1763. Six of the judges split 3–3 on the question of whether Aboriginal title had been extinguished. The Nisga'a did not prevail because the seventh justice, Pigeon J, found that the Court did not have jurisdiction to make a declaration in favour of the Nisga'a in the absence of a fiat of the Lieutenant-Governor of B.C. permitting suit against the provincial government.

Section 91(24) of the Constitution Act, 1867 ("British North America Act 1867") gives the federal government exclusive jurisdiction over First Nations, and thus the exclusive ability to extinguish Aboriginal title. Section Thirty-five of the Constitution Act, 1982 explicitly recognized and preserved aboriginal rights. R. v. Guerin (1982), the first Supreme Court of Canada decision handed down after the Constitution Act 1982, declared that Aboriginal title was sui generis and that the federal government has a fiduciary duty to preserve it. R. v. Simon (1985) overruled R. v. Syliboy (1929) which had held that Aboriginal peoples had no capacity to enter into treaties, and thus that the Numbered Treaties were void. A variety of non-land rights cases, anchored on the Constitution Act 1982, have also been influential.

Delgamuukw v. British Columbia (1997) laid down the essentials of the current test to prove Aboriginal title: "in order to make out a claim for [A]boriginal title, the [A]boriginal group asserting title must satisfy the following criteria: (i) the land must have been occupied prior to sovereignty, (ii) if present occupation is relied on as proof of occupation pre-sovereignty, there must be a continuity between present and pre-sovereignty occupation, and (iii) at sovereignty, that occupation must have been exclusive."

Subsequent decisions have drawn on the fiduciary duty to limit the ways in which the Crown can extinguish Aboriginal title, and to require prior consultation where the government has knowledge of a credible, but yet unproven, claim to Aboriginal title.

In 2014 the Supreme Court ruled unanimously for the plaintiff in Tsilhqot'in Nation v. British Columbia. Rejecting the government's claim that Aboriginal title applied only to villages and fishing sites, it instead agreed with the First Nation that Aboriginal title extends to the entire traditional territory of an indigenous group, even if that group was semi-nomadic and did not create settlements on that territory. It also stated that governments must have consent from First Nations which hold Aboriginal title in order to approve developments on that land, and governments can override the First Nation's wishes only in exceptional circumstances. The court reaffirmed, however, that areas under Aboriginal title are not outside the jurisdiction of the provinces, and provincial law still applies.

=== Japan ===
In 2008, Japan gave partial recognition to the Ainu people. However, land rights were not given for another eleven years.

In 2019, Japan fully recognised the Ainu people as the indigenous people of Japan and gave them some land rights if requested.

=== Malaysia ===
Malaysia recognised various statutory rights related to native customary laws (adat) before its courts acknowledged the independent existence of common law aboriginal title. Native Customary Rights (NCR) and Native Customary Land (NCL) are provided for under section 4(2) of the National Land Code 1965, the Sarawak Land Code 1957, the respective provisions of the National Land Code (Penang and Malacca Titles) Act 1963, and the Customary Tenure Enactment (FMS). Rajah's Order IX of 1875 recognized aboriginal title by providing for its extinguishment where cleared land was abandoned. Rajah's Order VIII of 1920 ("Land Order 1920") divided "State Lands" into four categories, one of them being "native holdings", and provided for the registration of customary holdings. The Aboriginal People's Act 1954 creates aboriginal areas and reserves, also providing for state acquisition of land without compensation. Article 160 of the Federal Constitution declares that custom has the force of law.

Malaysian court decisions from the 1950s on have held that customary lands were inalienable. In the 1970s, aboriginal rights were declared to be property rights, as protected by the Federal Constitution. Decisions in the 1970s and 1980s blocked state-sanctioned logging on customary land.

In 1997, Mokhtar Sidin JCA of the Jahore High Court became the first Malaysian judge to acknowledge common law aboriginal title in Adong bin Kuwau v. Kerajaan Negeri Johor. The High Court cited the Federal Constitution and the Aboriginal Peoples Act, as well as decisions from the Privy Council, Australia, Canada, New Zealand, and the United States. That case was the first time where Orang Asli directly and expressly challenged a state taking of their land. The opinion held that: "the aborigines' common law rights include, inter alia, the right to live on their land as their forefathers had lived." The case was upheld on appeal, but the Federal Court did not write an opinion.

Later High Court and Court of Appeal decisions built upon the foundation of Adong bin Kuwau. However, the ability for indigenous peoples to bring such suits was seriously limited by a 2005 ruling that claims must be brought under O. 53 RHC, rather than the representative action provision.

In 2007, the Federal Court of Malaysia wrote an opinion endorsing common law aboriginal title for the first time in Superintendent of Lands v. Madeli bin Salleh. The Federal Court endorsed Mabo and Calder, stating that "the proposition of law as enunciated in these two cases reflected the common law position with regard to native titles throughout the Commonwealth." The High Court of Kuching held in 2010, for the first time, that NCL may be transferred for consideration between members of the same community, as long as such transfers are not contrary to customary law.

=== New Zealand ===
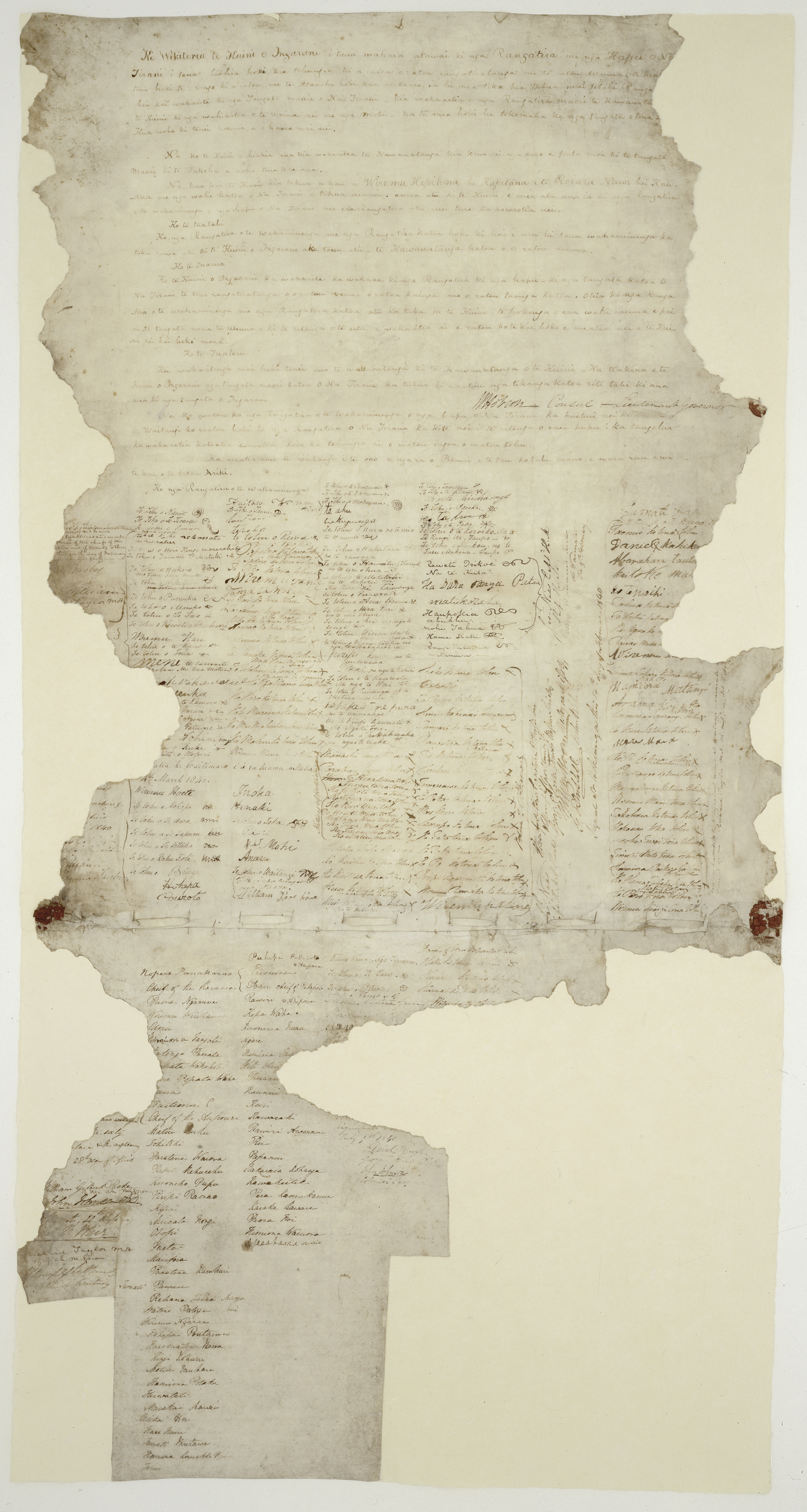
The Treaty of Waitangi (1840)

New Zealand was the second jurisdiction in the world to recognize aboriginal title, but a slew of extinguishing legislation (beginning with the New Zealand land confiscations) has left the Māori with little to claim except for river beds, lake beds, and the foreshore and seabed. In 1847, in a decision that was not appealed to the Privy Council, the Supreme Court of the colony of New Zealand recognized aboriginal title in R v Symonds. The decision was based on common law and the Treaty of Waitangi (1840). Chapman J went farther than any judge—before or since—in declaring that aboriginal title "cannot be extinguished (at least in times of peace) otherwise than by the free consent of the Native occupiers".

The New Zealand Parliament responded with the Native Lands Act 1862, the Native Rights Act 1865 and the Native Lands Act 1865 which established the Native Land Court (today the Māori Land Court) to hear aboriginal title claims, and—if proven—convert them into freehold interests that could be sold to Pākehā (New Zealanders of European descent). That court created the "1840 rule", which converted Māori interests into fee simple if they were sufficiently in existence in 1840, or else disregarded them. Symonds remained the guiding principle, until Wi Parata v the Bishop of Wellington (1877). Wi Parata undid Symonds, advocating the doctrine of terra nullius and declaring the Treaty of Waitangi unenforceable.

The Privy Council disagreed in Nireaha Tamaki v Baker, and other rulings, but courts in New Zealand continued to hand down decisions materially similar to Wi Parata. The Coal Mines Amendment Act 1903 (Note: Currently, section 261 of the Coal Mines Act 1979.) and the Native Land Act 1909 declared aboriginal title unenforceable against the Crown. Eventually, the Privy Council acquiesced to the view that the Treaty was non-justiciable.

Land was also lost under other legislation. The Counties Act 1886 s.245 said that tracks, "over any Crown lands or Native lands, and generally used without obstruction as roads, shall, for the purposes of this section, be deemed to be public roads, not exceeding sixty-six feet in width, and under the control of the Council". Opposition to such confiscation was met by force, as at Opuatia in 1894. A series of Acts, beginning a year after the Treaty of Waitangi with the Land Claims Ordinance 1841, allowed the government to take and sell 'Waste Lands'.

Favorable court decisions turned aboriginal title litigation towards the lake beds, but the Māori were unsuccessful in claiming the rivers the beaches, and customary fishing rights on the foreshore. The Limitation Act 1950 established a 12-year statute of limitations for aboriginal title claims (6 years for damages), and the Maori Affairs Act 1953 prevented the enforcement of customary tenure against the Crown. The Treaty of Waitangi Act 1975 created the Waitangi Tribunal to issue non-binding decisions, concerning alleged breaches of the Treaty, and facilitate settlements.

Te Weehi v Regional Fisheries Office (1986) was the first modern case to recognize an aboriginal title claim in a New Zealand court since Wi Parata, granting non-exclusive customary fishing rights. The Court cited the writings of Dr Paul McHugh and indicated that whilst the Treaty of Waitangi confirmed those property rights, their legal foundation was the common law principle of continuity. The Crown did not appeal Te Weehi which was regarded as the motivation for Crown settlement of the sea fisheries claims (1992). Subsequent cases began meanwhile—and apart from the common law doctrine—to rehabilitate the Treaty of Waitangi, declaring it the "fabric of New Zealand society" and thus relevant even to legislation of general applicability. New Zealand Maori Council v Attorney-General held that the government owed a duty analogous to a fiduciary duty toward the Māori. This cleared the way for a variety of Treaty-based non-land Māori customary rights. By this time the Waitangi Tribunal in its Muriwhenua Fishing Report (1988) was describing Treaty-based and common law aboriginal title derived rights as complementary and having an 'aura' of their own.

Circa the Te Ture Whenua Māori Act 1993, less than 5% of New Zealand was held as Māori customary land. In 2002, the Privy Council confirmed that the Maori Land Court, which does not have judicial review jurisdiction, was the exclusive forum for territorial aboriginal title claims (i.e. those equivalent to a customary title claim) In 2003, Ngati Apa v Attorney-General overruled In Re the Ninety-Mile Beach and Wi Parata, declaring that Māori could bring claims to the foreshore in Land Court. The Court also indicated that customary aboriginal title interests (non-territorial) might also remain around the coastline. The Foreshore and Seabed Act 2004 extinguished those rights before any lower court could hear a claim to either territorial customary title (the Maori Land Court) or non-territorial customary rights (the High Court's inherent common law jurisdiction). That legislation has been condemned by the Committee on the Elimination of Racial Discrimination. The 2004 Act was repealed with the passage of the Marine and Coastal Area (Takutai Moana) Act 2011.

=== Papua New Guinea ===
The High Court of Australia, which had appellate jurisdiction before 1975, recognized aboriginal title in Papua New Guinea—decades before it did so in Australia—in Geita Sebea v Territory of Papua (1941), Administration of Papua and New Guinea v Daera Guba (1973) (the "Newtown case"), and other cases. The Supreme Court of Papua New Guinea followed suit.

Schedule 2 of the Constitution of Papua New Guinea recognizes customary land tenure, and 97% of the land in the country remains unalienated.

=== South Africa ===
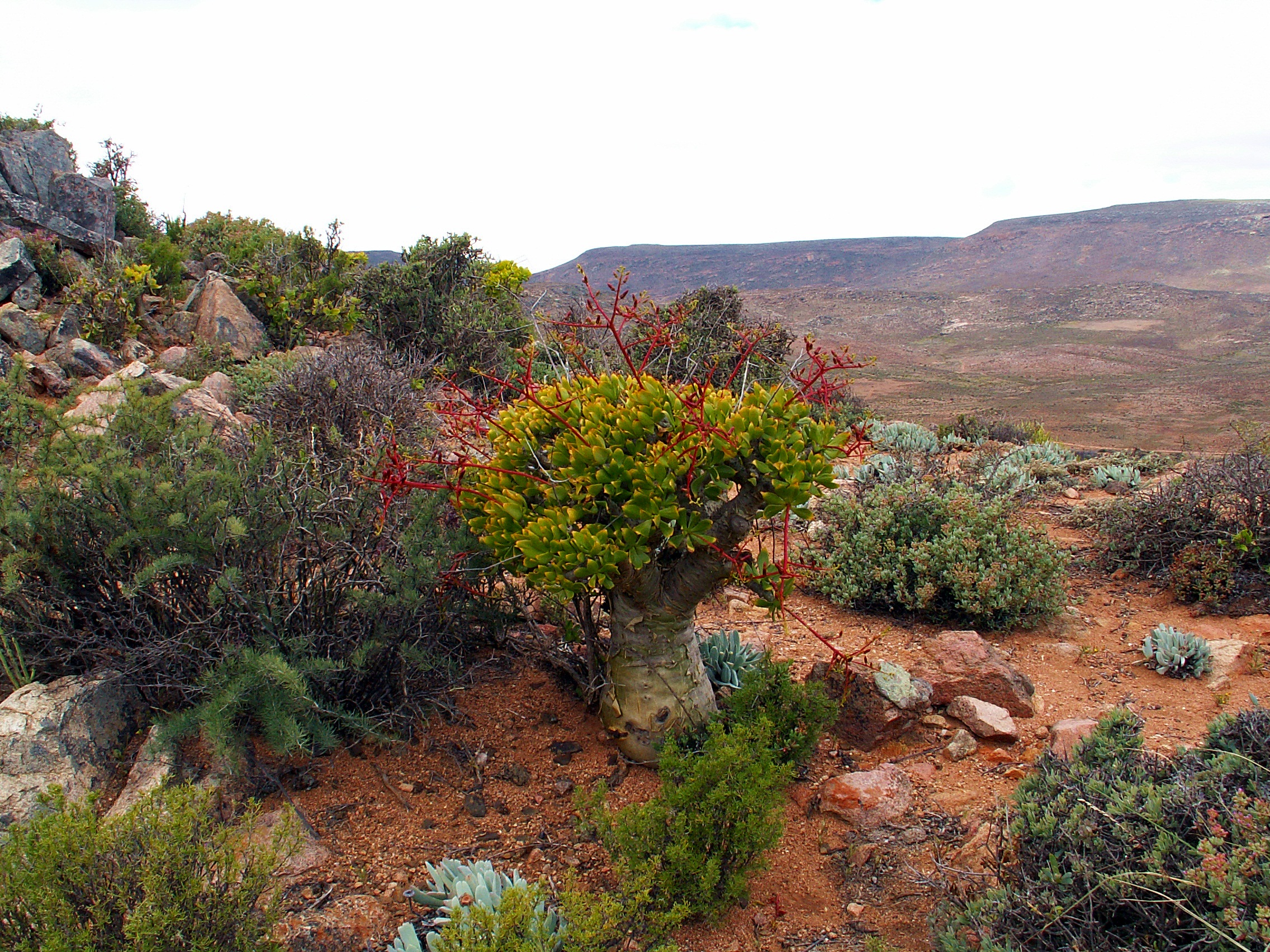
The Richtersveld desert

In Alexkor v Richtersveld Community (2003), a suit under the Restitution of Land Rights Act 1994, lawyers gathered case law from settler jurisdictions around the world, and judges of the Constitutional Court of South Africa talked frankly about Aboriginal title. The Land Claims Court had dismissed the complaint of the Richtersveld peoples, whose land was seized by a government owned diamond mining operation. The Supreme Court of Appeal disagreed, citing Mabo and Yorta Yorta, but held that the aboriginal title had been extinguished. Whether the precedent will be the start of further land rights claims by indigenous peoples is an open question, given the cut-off date of 1913 in the Restitution Act.

The case ultimately did not lead to the inclusion of the Aboriginal title in South African doctrine. Legal scholars allege that this is because the application of terms like 'indigenous' and 'Aboriginal' in a South African context would lead to a number of contradictions.

The identity of the indigenous groups in South Africa is not self-evident. The adoption of a strict definition, including only communities descended from San and Khoekhoe people, would entail the exclusion of black African communities, an approach deemed detrimental to the spirit of national unity. The legacy of the Natives Land Act also means that few communities retain relationships with the land of which they held before 1913.

=== Taiwan ===
Clickable imagemap of Taiwan showing traditional territories of indigenous highland peoples. Alternate spellings or names: Pazih (Pazeh); Taroko (Truku, Seediq); Yami (Tao).

Taiwanese indigenous peoples are Austronesian peoples, making up a little over 2% of Taiwan's population; the rest of the population is composed of ethnic Chinese who colonised the island from the 17th century onward.

From 1895 Taiwan was under Japanese rule and indigenous rights to land were extinguished. In 1945, the Republic of China (ROC) took control of Taiwan from the Empire of Japan; a rump Republic of China was established on Taiwan in 1949 after the Communists won the Chinese Civil War. From then, indigenous people's access to traditional lands was limited, as the ROC built cities, railroads, national parks, mines and tourist attractions. In 2005 the Basic Law for Indigenous Peoples was passed.

In 2017 the Council of Indigenous Peoples declared 18,000 square kilometres (6,900 sq mi), about half of Taiwan's land area (mostly in the east of the island), to be "traditional territory"; about 90 percent is public land that indigenous people can claim, and to whose development they can consent or not; the rest is privately owned.

=== Tanzania ===
In 1976, the Barabaig people challenged their eviction from the Hanang District of the Manyara Region, due to the government's decision to grow wheat in the region, funded by the Canadian Food Aid Programme. The wheat program would later become the National Agricultural and Food Corporation (NAFCO). NAFCO would lose a different suit to the Mulbadaw Village Council in 1981, which upheld customary land rights. The Court of Appeal of Tanzania overturned the judgement in 1985, without reversing the doctrine of aboriginal title, holding that the specific claimants had not proved that they were native. The Extinction of Customary Land Right Order 1987, which purported to extinguish Barabaig customary rights, was declared null and void that year.

The Court of Appeal delivered a decision in 1994 that sided with the aboriginal title claimant on nearly all issues, but ultimately ruled against them, holding that the Constitution (Consequential, Transitional and Temporary Provisions) Act, 1984—which rendered the constitutional right to property enforceable in court—was not retroactive. In 1999, the Maasai were awarded monetary compensation and alternative land by the Court of Appeal due to their eviction from the Mkomazi Game Reserve when a foreign investor started a rhino farm. The government has yet to comply with the ruling.

=== United States ===
The United States, under the tenure of Chief Justice John Marshall, became the first jurisdiction in the world to judicially acknowledge (in dicta) the existence of aboriginal title in series of key decisions. Marshall envisioned a usufruct, whose content was limited only by "their own discretion", inalienable except to the federal government, and extinguishable only by the federal government. Early state court decisions also presumed the existence of some form of aboriginal title.

Later cases established that aboriginal title could be terminated only by the "clear and plain intention" of the federal government, a test that has been adopted by most other jurisdictions. The federal government was found to owe a fiduciary duty to the holders of aboriginal title, but such duty did not become enforceable until the late-20th century.

Although the property right itself is not created by statute, sovereign immunity barred the enforcement of aboriginal title until the passage of the Indian Claims Commission Act of 1946, which created the Indian Claims Commission (succeeded by the United States Court of Claims in 1978, and later the United States Court of Federal Claims in 1982). These bodies have no authority to title land, only to pay compensation. United States v. Alcea Band of Tillamooks (1946) was the first ever judicial compensation for a taking of Indian lands unrecognized by a specific treaty obligation. Tee-Hit-Ton Indians v. United States (1955) established that the extinguishment of aboriginal title was not a "taking" within the meaning of the Fifth Amendment. On the strength of this precedent, claimants in the Court of Federal Claims have been denied interest—which otherwise would be payable under Fifth Amendment jurisprudence—totalling billions of dollars ($9 billion alone, as estimated by a footnote in Tee-Hit-Ton, in interest for claims then pending based on existing jurisdictional statutes).

Unlike Australia, Canada, and New Zealand, the United States allows aboriginal title to be created post-sovereignty; rather than existing since pre-sovereignty, aboriginal title need only have existed for a "long time" (as little as 30 years) to be compensable.

== Jurisdiction rejecting the doctrine ==
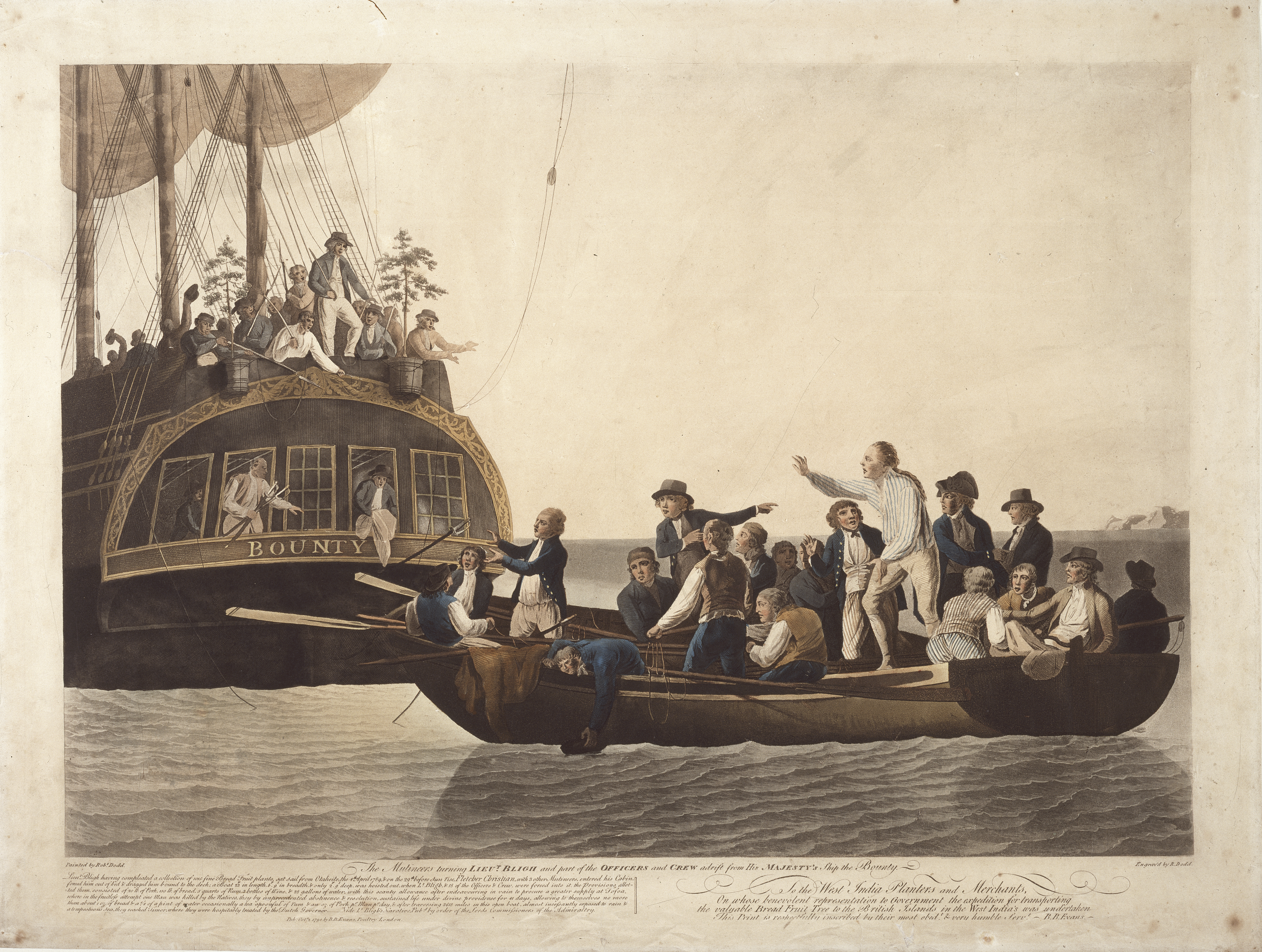
Some of the Bounty mutineers landed on the Pitcairn Islands and later on Norfolk Island, hundreds of years after archaeologists estimate the original Polynesian inhabitants departed these islands.

There is no possibility for aboriginal title litigation in some Commonwealth jurisdictions; for instance, Barbados and the Pitcairn Islands were uninhabited for hundreds of years prior to colonization, although they had previously been inhabited by the Arawak and Carib, and Polynesian peoples, respectively.

=== India ===
Unlike most jurisdictions, the doctrine that aboriginal title is inalienable never took hold in India. Sales of land from indigenous persons to both British subjects and aliens were widely upheld. The Pratt–Yorke opinion (1757), a joint opinion of England's Attorney-General and Solicitor-General, declared that land purchases by the British East India Company from the Princely states were valid even without a Crown patent authorizing the purchase.

In a 1924 appeal from India, the Privy Council issued an opinion that largely corresponded to the Continuity Doctrine: Vaje Singji Jorava Ssingji v Secretary of State for India. This line of reasoning was adopted by the Supreme Court of India in a line of decisions, originating with the proprietary claims of the former rulers of the Princely states, as well as their heirs and assigns. Adivasi land rights litigation has yielded little result. Most Adivasi live in state-owned forests.

== See also ==
- Ancestral domain
- Native Tongue Title
