= Coastal Coalition =

Political group in New Zealand

The Coastal Coalition is a political group in New Zealand that opposes the removal of coastal and marine land from Crown ownership. It was created to fight what it considers the risk of coastal land and marine areas coming under the control of local Māori under the proposed Marine and Coastal Area (Takutai Moana) Bill of 2010, which is intended to replace the Foreshore and Seabed Act 2004. The group has run a large number of advertisements opposing the Bill.

The group has been called 'clowns' and 'profoundly sickening' by Chris Finlayson, the New Zealand attorney-general responsible for bringing in the new Bill, because of alleged untruths in their arguments. The group in turn called for Finlayson to be taken off his duties in respect to the Bill, arguing that he lacked the openness for discourse about the Bill that should have to be expected of his position.
