= R v Symonds =

1847 New Zealand Supreme Court case

- Court: Auckland Supreme Court
- Full case name: The Queen at the suit of Charles Hunter McIntosh v John Jeremyn Symonds
- Decided: 9 June 1847
- Citation: (1847) NZPCC 388
- Transcript: Available here

Court membership
- Judges sitting: Martin CJ and Chapman J

Keywords
- Aboriginal title, Treaty of Waitangi, Scire facias

R v Symonds (The Queen v Symonds) was an 1847 New Zealand Supreme Court (Note: Until 1980, the Supreme Court of New Zealand was the name used for what is now the High Court of New Zealand.) case that incorporated the concept of aboriginal title into New Zealand law and upheld the government's pre-emptive right of purchase to Māori land deriving from the common law and expressed in the Treaty of Waitangi.

Although the Native Lands Act 1862 waived Crown pre-emption, the notion of aboriginal title has been revived in the 20th century to deal with Māori property rights.

== Background ==
Faced with a "virtually bankrupt colonial administration" Governor Robert FitzRoy had in 1843 waived the Crown's right of pre-emption to purchase Māori land, allowing settlers to directly buy land from Māori if they held certificates waiving the Crown's right. Under what became known as the "penny-an-acre" proclamation, 90,000 acres were bought by settlers.

When Governor George Grey took office in 1845, he decided to take a test case, with a claimant seeking a writ of scire facias to "justify his refusal to award Crown grants over land to persons whose claims were based on those certificates." The Attorney-General, William Swainson, appeared for Jermyn Symonds, and Thomas Bartley appeared for Charles Hunter McIntosh. The case involved an island in the Firth of Thames that McIntosh had bought from Māori, which he claimed extinguished all title that the Crown had. The same island was then conveyed by Grey as a Crown grant to Symonds.

The argument for the plaintiff was that the Māori language text of the Treaty of Waitangi only gave the Crown the right of first refusal and not pre-emption over Māori land.

As David Williams has noted, "The essential political issue at stake in the Gipps/Wentworth debates and in The Queen v Symonds related to the extent of Crown control over the profits to be made in the process of extinguishing Māori title and making land available to incoming settlers."

== Judgment ==
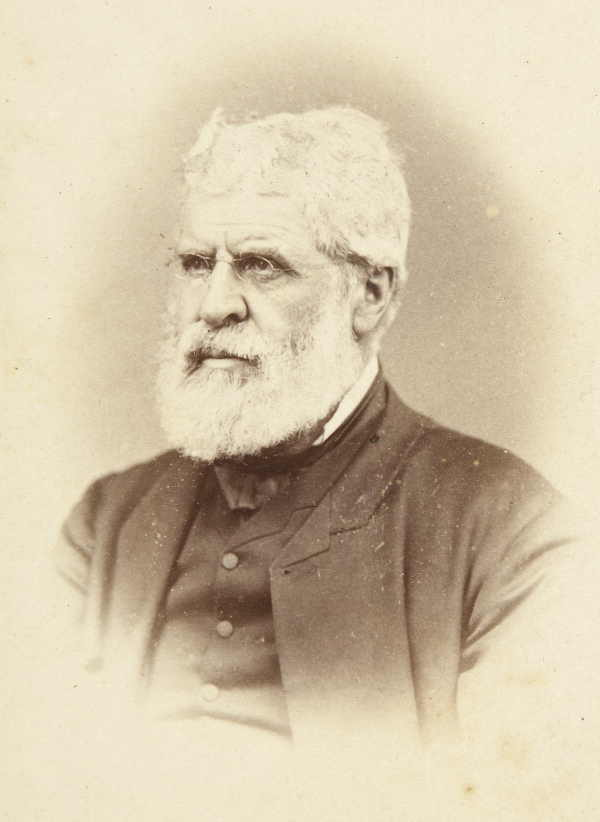
Justice Chapman, was an Australian and New Zealand judge and politician.

The judges of the Supreme Court asserted the "paramount importance of the Crown's pre-emptive monopoly right to purchase lands from Māori".

In addition, Justice Chapman held,

"Whatever may be the opinion of jurists as to the strength or weakness of the Native title, whatsoever may have been the past vague notions of the Natives of their country, whatever may be their present clearer and still growing conception of their dominion over land, it cannot be too solemnly asserted that it is entitled to be respected, that it cannot be extinguished (at least in times of peace) otherwise than by the free consent of the native occupiers."

Chief Justice William Martin considered whether there was any authority for the Governor-General to issue the certificates and concluded that there was no express authority and that no authority could be implied as,

"The 2nd section of the Land Claims Ordinance of June 1841 (Sess. 1, No.2,) declares and enacts that "the sole and absolute right of pre-emption from the aboriginal inhabitants vest in and can only be exercised by her Majesty, her Heirs and Successors, and that all titles to land in the said colony which are held or claimed by virtue of purchases or gifts.... either mediately or immediately from the chiefs or other individuals ...shall be, absolutely null and void."

== Significance ==
As a result of the case, one contemporary newspaper, The Southern Cross, estimated that three quarters of titles to land in the new colony were invalidated. Governor Grey introduced a new system of land acquisition for settlement whereby a government commission negotiated purchases from iwi and hapu at tribal meetings. However settlers who had bought land under waiver of pre-emption were allowed to obtain a Crown grant to their land if their purchase was in accord with FitzRoy's proclamation; or could seek a grant of the land they had purchased under the Land Claims Compensation Ordinance 1846; or could seek to have the land they purchased granted to them after investigation by a commissioner under a new set of regulations. As a Waitangi Tribunal report put it, "Despite the fact that FitzRoy had exceeded his 'lawful authority', settlers had been able to rely on the Government's clemency, or be taken to have a strict legal right as long as they had complied with the proclamations."

Tom Bennion, in New Zealand Land Law has noted that the ratio of the case, "that Māori customary interests were to be solemnly respected and were not to be extinguished without the free consent of Māori", "remains one of the strongest assertions of aboriginal title in any of the jurisdictions in which it has been recognised". David Williams, has however been critical of the effect of the decision on the historical trajectory of colonisation, noting that for the colonial government, "Crown pre-emption was now seen more as a device to maintain Crown control over colonisation than to protect Māori interests."

The effect of the decision was undone in 1877 by the ruling of Justice Prendergast in Wi Parata v Bishop of Wellington that the Treaty of Waitangi, "could not transform the natives’ right of occupation into one of legal character since, so far as it purported to cede the sovereignty of New Zealand, it was a simple nullity for no body politic existed capable of making cession of sovereignty". However in the late nineteenth and early twentieth centuries courts frequently, "appealed to this case as the authority for holding that municipal Courts had no jurisdiction over any matter involving native title. They did so on the basis of isolated passages within The Queen v Symonds (1847) where Chapman J. had stated that municipal Courts could only recognise land titles deriving from the Crown."

The concept of aboriginal title has been resurrected within the common law in the wake of Māori protest in the 1970s and statutory recognition of the treaty. Reconciling the concept of aboriginal title, and the radical title of the Crown, was critical to the decision of the Court of Appeal in Ngati Apa v Attorney-General, and as such R v Symonds provided a precedent for the Ngati Apa decision.
