= Lake Opuatia =

- Lake Opuatia is in the Waikato region of the North Island.
- Location: Waikato District, Waikato region, North Island
- Coordinates: 37°26′7.2″S 175°03′48.3″E
- Lake type: peat lake
- Basin countries: New Zealand
- Surface area: 7 ha (17 acres)
- Surface elevation: 5 m (16 ft)

Lake Opuatia is a small lake in the much larger Opuatia wetland, which drains from the west into the Waikato River. It lies near the foot of a long valley drained by the Opuatia Stream.

== Geology ==
The lake is a peat lake, probably formed after Taupō pumice blocked the drainage of the valley about 1,800 years ago, when it swept down the Waikato.

== History ==
The lake was in an area occupied by Ngāti Karewa and Ngāti Tipa. Despite their loyalty to the Crown during the Invasion of the Waikato, their land was also confiscated in 1863. 45,500 acres (18,400 ha) were later returned to some members of Ngāti Tipa, though disputes about ownership continued until 1921.

As part of a policy of opening up land for settlement under the deferred payment scheme, the Government built a bridleway from Churchill, a settlement which then stood on the west bank of the river about 4 mi (6.4 km) west of Rangiriri. By 1881, 10 mi (16 km) of the route to the south of the lake had been opened as far as Glen Murray. By 1883 a through track from the Waikato River to the West Coast was in existence. In 1894 a 12 ft (3.7 m) wide road was recommended. Flax was a local industry for a while.

After survey pegs had been pulled up, when the Counties Act 1886 was invoked to build Opuatia Rd on Māori land, the police, with armed support, arrested 10 men and 8 women in 1894, two of whom were sentenced to two months hard labour.

The government bought 27,407 acres (11,091 ha) in 1895.

Roads in the valley were being metalled in the 1920s.

=== Schools ===
Schools used to exist at Churchill, just to the east of the lake, at Orton, 6 km (3.7 mi) to the north, and on Otuiti Rd at Opuatia. Opuatia school was open from 1917 (starting with 20 pupils) to 1973 and is now a community centre. A telephone was connected in 1919. There was also a church in the 1850s.

== Wildlife ==
=== Aquatic vegetation ===
The lake has not been surveyed since 1993, when four species of submerged plants were identified, including fennel leaved pondweed. Potamogeton crispus and P.pectinatus, with occasional charophytes Nitella hookeri and Chara corallina.

=== Fish ===
Longfin eels have been recorded at the lake.

=== Riparian vegetation ===
The lake is in 950 ha (2,300 acres) of wetland, 180 ha (440 acres) of which is peat bog, and the remainder swamp and fen dominated by willow and manuka, with areas of rare restiad bog The understorey has indigenous sedges, Nertera scapanioides, Microtis unifolia, and ferns (matua-rarauhe and kiokio), with raupo at the edges. Weeds include gorse, reed sweet grass and reed canary grass, swamp alder, yellow flag iris, beggarticks and royal fern. Possum and red deer are among the animal pests. Threatened species include orchids and carnivorous bladderworts.

=== Birds ===
Canada goose, fernbirds, yellowhammer, chaffinch, riroriro, swallow, pheasant, pūkeko, mallard, harrier and shag have all been recorded in the area.

The lake has been a venue for duck shooters since at least 1921.

=== Restoration ===
In 2000 Regional Council agreed to mitigate the effect of flood protection works near Mercer by restoring Opuatia Wetland and flooding 60 ha (150 acres) more frequently. Gorse and willow were sprayed with herbicide and cabbage trees, karamu, manuka, mingimingi, poataniwha, Coprosma rhamnoides, pokaka, flax, Astelia grandis, gahnia, Coprosma tenuicaulis, kahikatea and mataī were planted from 2006. A further 10,000 plants have since gone in to reduce nutrients flowing from farmland to wetland.

== Opuatia Stream ==
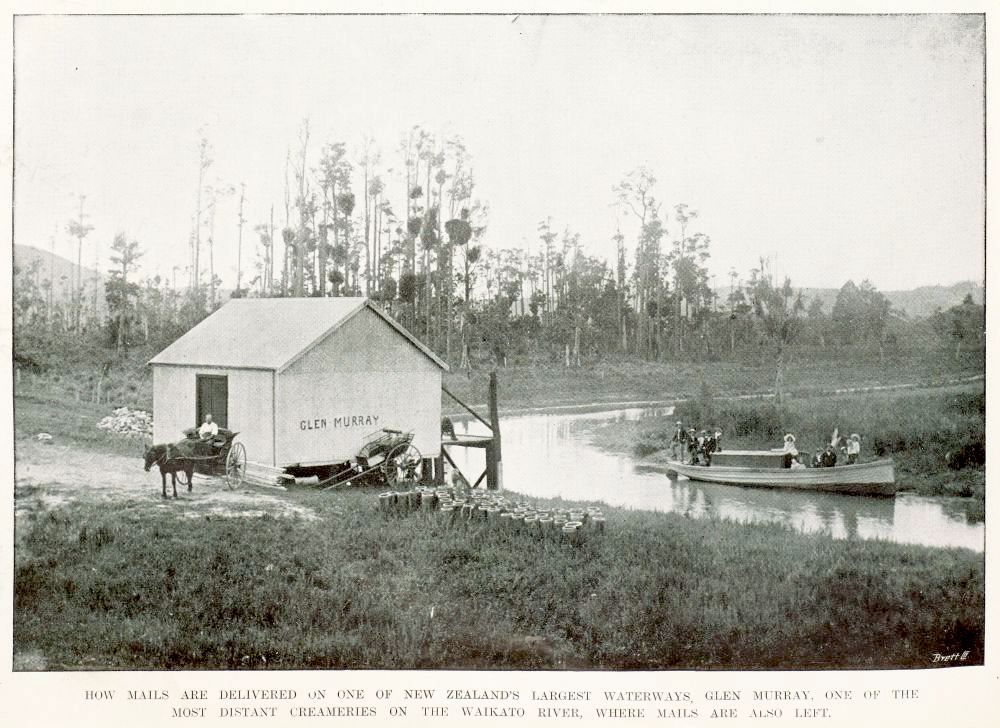
Glen Murray landing in 1905

There is no surface link between the lake and the stream, which flows nearby, and the lake and bog are generally fed by rainwater, except during unusually high floods, when water backs up from the Waikato.

The stream rises near Ponganui Road, about 30 km (19 mi) up from the lake. A water quality monitoring site, about 8 km (5.0 mi) from the headwaters, has water classified as in the worst 25% for like sites in respect of bacteria, clarity and nitrogen. Planting, fencing and goat control have been done in the 18,251 ha (45,100 acres) upper catchment to improve the water quality.

The stream was navigable for about 8 km (5.0 mi) to Glen Murray landing, built about 1895, where Opuatia had a post office in 1911.
