= Mohegan Indians v. Connecticut =

18th-century indigenous land rights case in Great Britain

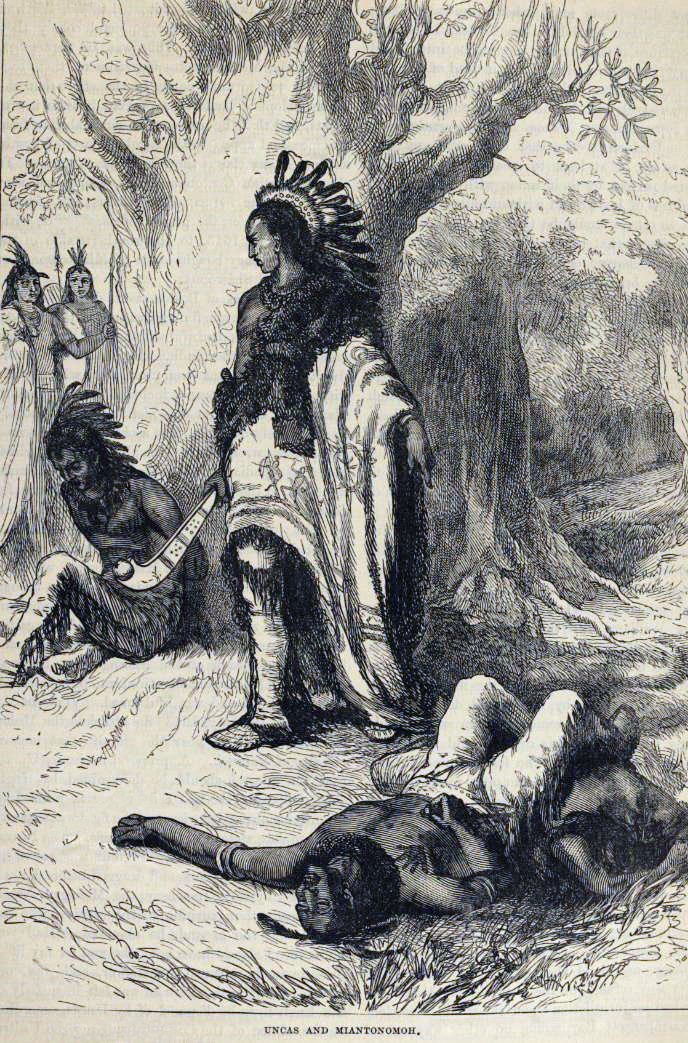
Uncas, portrayed as triumphant over a Narragansett enemy

Mohegan Indians v. Connecticut (1705–1773) was the first Indigenous land rights litigation in history in a common law jurisdiction. James Youngblood Henderson, professor of law, calls the case "the first major legal test of indigenous tenure." Robert Clinton calls it the "first formal litigation of North American Indian rights."

Mark Walters has noted that the case established that "in certain circumstances native nations on reserved lands in British colonies were subject, not to colonial jurisdictions established for settlers, but to their own traditional customs." The Mohegan claim was not a claim to aboriginal title, but a claim that certain lands were held in trust by the descendants of John Mason on behalf of the Mohegan.

In 1979, the Mohegan Indian Tribe filed a suit against the state for possession of lands in Montville, Connecticut. In this re-litigation, the judge held in 1980 that the 1790 Non-Intercourse Act applied to the case, a ruling upheld on appeal. The United States Supreme Court declined to hear the case. In 1994 the tribe gained federal recognition by the Department of Interior; in addition, that year Congress passed the Mohegan Nation (Connecticut) Land Claim Settlement Act, which authorized the US to take 800 acres of land into trust for the tribe for use as its reservation, and allowed it to have gambling operations on the property.

== The dispute ==
English colonists arrived on the coast of Connecticut in the 1630s, coming into contact with the Mohegan people, who had been part of the Pequot. Following the Pequot War of 1637, in which the Mohegan had allied with the colonists against the Pequot, Mohegan sachem Uncas ceded all Mohegan lands to the New England Colonies in 1640, with the exception of a reserve of farms and hunting grounds.

In 1659, the Mohegan conveyed the reserved lands to Major John Mason, the future deputy governor. The conveyance was to Mason and his heirs "as their Protector and Guardian In Trust for the whole Moheagan Tribe." Mason transferred the land to the colonial government in 1660, on the condition that sufficient land be left for the Mohegan to farm. Both the Mohegan and Mason's heirs argued—during the century-long dispute—that this last transfer was invalid, and that his heirs continued to hold the land in trust for the Mohegan.

Connecticut was incorporated by royal charter in 1662, with its boundaries including the disputed lands. A 1681 treaty between the Mohegan and the colony acknowledged a Mohegan interest in the land; it provided that the colony would administer "Equal Justice" to the Mohegan "as our own people" if they "before hand declared their Subjection to our Laws." In 1687, the colony began granting the disputed land to settlers by legislation and orders in council.

== The proceedings ==
=== 1704 Dudley Commission ===
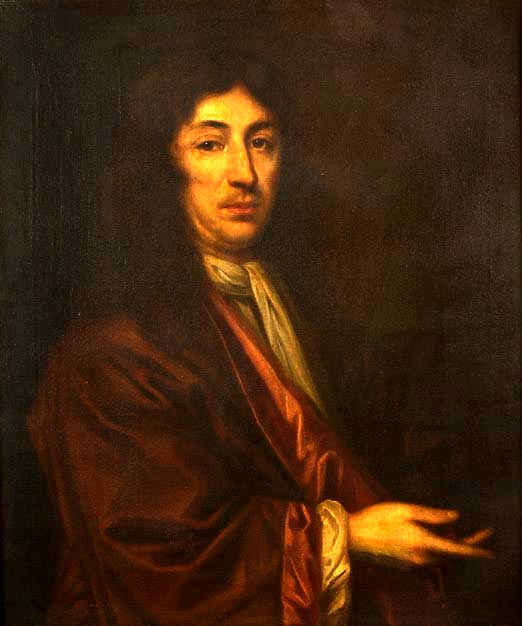
Joseph Dudley, Governor of Massachusetts

In 1704, the Masons petitioned the Crown, on behalf of the Mohegan, arguing that the land grants to colonists violated the treaties with the tribe. In February 1704, Sir Edward Northey, the Attorney General of England and Wales, opined to the English Board of Trade, which administered the colony, that the Crown could establish a court with the authority to hear the dispute, and enforce its decision upon the colony should the Mohegan prevail. Northey also expressed his opinion that the act of Connecticut in granting the land was "illegal and void." In March 1704, the Board of Trade agreed and referred Northey's advice to the Crown. The Board of Trade also recommended that the Crown cover the legal fees of the Mohegan.

The Crown agreed in April 1704. It referred the dispute to Governor Joseph Dudley and the council of Massachusetts, with a Commission empowering them to form a tribunal. The commission's ruling was to be legally binding without subsequent approval by the Crown, but the right of appeal to the Privy Council was reserved.

The court consisted of Joseph Dudley, Edward Palmes, Giles Sylvester, Jr., Jahleel Brenton, Nathaniel Byfield, Thomas Hooker, James Avery, John Avery, John Morgan, and Thomas Leffingwell. They were collectively known as "the Dudley Commission." This was a significant group of men, both in government position and in family connections. Dudley was the Governor of Massachusetts and president of the commission. Palmes lived in New London and was the son-in-law of Governor Winthrop of Connecticut. Brenton was the son of Governor William Brenton of Rhode Island. Sylvester was from New Haven, Connecticut. Byfield was a prominent judge in Rhode Island. Hooker was the son of one of the prime founders of Connecticut, who was also named Thomas Hooker. Morgan had been a captain in King Philip's War, lived in Preston, Connecticut, and had been a delegate to the colonial legislature. James Avery had been in the King Philip's War and in the colonial legislature. Thomas Leffingwell was eighty years old, a long time friend of Mohegan Chief Uncas, a co-founder of Norwich, Connecticut, and a longtime member of the colonial legislature.

Walters argues that the Mohegan must have been considered a "component of the Empire" in order for the Crown to have original jurisdiction over a dispute between them and Connecticut. In refusing to create a similar Commission to mediate a dispute between settlers in New Jersey and the colony of New Jersey over the purchase of Native American lands, the Attorney General later opined that the situations were inapposite because there was "no common Court of Justice" between the Mohegan and Connecticut.

Connecticut contested the jurisdiction of the commission and did not participate further. Dudley and the Commission unanimously sided with the Mohegan in 1705.

=== 1706 Commission of Review ===
On appeal from the colony, the Privy Council appellate committee granted a Commission of Review in 1706. This Commission never met.

=== 1737 Commission of Review ===
A second such Commission was established in 1737. The second Commission consisted of the Governor of Rhode Island, and members from the councils of Rhode Island and New York. That Commission sided with Connecticut in 1738, on the grounds that Ben Uncas—who was embroiled in a sachem succession dispute—was the valid sachem and had recently released Connecticut from the land claim. After the Commission determined that Ben Uncas was the sachem, before reaching the merits, the New York council members (who had dissented on the sachem issue) accused the Rhode Island council members of bias and left. The merits decision was ultimately set aside because of "alleged irregularities." A third Commission was called.

=== 1743 Commission of Review ===
Meeting in 1743, the third Commission sided with Connecticut. The sachem issue was not re-litigated because Connecticut withdrew its objection. Third-party tenants were allowed to raise an objection to the jurisdiction of the original tribunal. The Commission eventually reached the merits and decided that the deeds to the colonial settlers were valid.

=== Privy Council decision ===
The Mohegan appealed to the Privy Council. The appeal began in 1770 and the Privy Council sided with Connecticut in 1772, without a written opinion. The Crown confirmed this decision in 1773.

== Reporting ==
The decision was not reported in a law reporter. No reported judicial decisions from the 17th or 18th century recognized or applied Aboriginal customary law. J.H. Smith provides a detailed history of the legal proceedings of the case, but only sporadically includes quotes from the decision.

== Significance ==
=== Aboriginal title ===
A summary of Mohegan Indians was included by Chief Justice John Marshall in his opinion in Johnson v. McIntosh (1823):

The controversy between the colony of Connecticut and the Mohegan Indians, depended on the nature and extent of a grant made by those Indians to the colony; on the nature and extent of the reservations made by the Indians, in their several deeds and treaties, which were alleged to be recognised by the legitimate authority; and on the violation by the colony of rights thus reserved and secured. We do not perceive, in that case, any assertion of the principle, that individuals might obtain a complete and valid title from the Indians.

This has been considered the first case to rule on indigenous land tenure. In 1995, Robert N. Clinton described it as "the first major eighteenth century challenge to local colonial control of relations with Indian tribes," and "the greatest cause ever heard at the Council Board."

=== Tribal sovereignty ===
Some commentators have suggested that Mogehan Indians demonstrated that British law recognized indigenous tribal nations as having rights of sovereignty. For example, in 1950 J.H. Smith claims that the Mohegan were "juristically regarded as sovereign." Mark Walters, a lecturer at Oxford, disagrees with these claims. Walters agrees that, if true, that interpretation of the decision would "revolutionize the traditional understanding of Aboriginal legal status in Canada."

== Modern relitigation and settlement ==
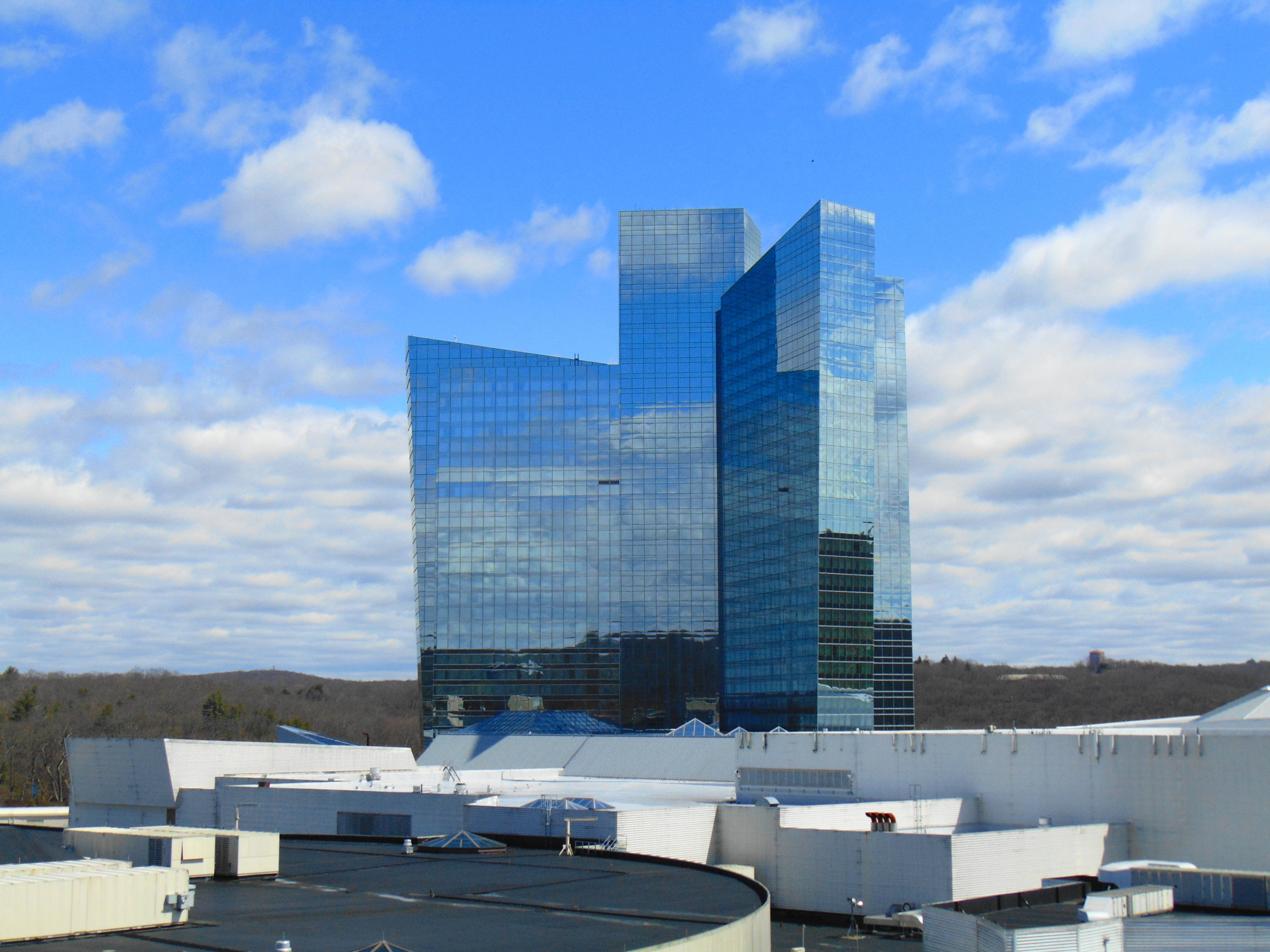
The Mohegan Sun, the second-largest casino in the United States

In 1979, the Mohegan Indian Tribe filed a complaint against the state of Connecticut in the United States District Court for the District of Connecticut for possession of lands in the northeast portion of Montville, Connecticut. In his ruling of 1980, Judge Blumenfeld rejected the state's motion to dismiss, holding that the 1790 Indian Non-intercourse Act applied to the entire country, including the lands in question.

The Second Circuit upheld this ruling on interlocutory appeal. The U.S. Supreme Court denied certiorari and let the Appeals decision stand.

On remand, Blumenfeld granted the Mohegan's motion to strike the state's affirmative defenses, holding that the state's title—acquired from private parties who acquired the land in violation of the Non-intercourse Act—was void, and that the Tenth and Eleventh amendments did not bar the suit. Finally, Blumenfeld struck the state's defense of res judicata based on the 18th-century lawsuit, holding—inter alia—that "the 1743 judgment itself recognizes the Indians' possessory right to the lands at issue in this action."

On March 15, 1994, the Department of the Interior granted the Mohegan Indian Tribe (MITC) federal recognition. On October 19, 1994, the U.S. Congress passed the Mohegan Nation (Connecticut) Land Claim Settlement Act, extinguishing all of the Mohegan aboriginal title in Connecticut and all claims of the Mohegan Nation against the state, in exchange for its approval of Mohegan gaming operations. It authorized the transfer of 800 acres, the remaining Mohegan reservation lands, which had been used as the United Nuclear site (and cleaned up), to the United States in trust for the tribe.

The MITC opened the Mohegan Sun casino on October 12, 1996. It has since expanded the facility to a full resort, including a hotel, conference facility, restaurants and shops.
