= Wi Parata v Bishop of Wellington =

1877 New Zealand Supreme Court case

Wi Parata v Bishop of Wellington was an 1877 Supreme Court (Note: Until 1980, the Supreme Court of New Zealand was the name used for what is now the High Court of New Zealand.) case on the status of native title to land in New Zealand. The court held that native title—ownership of land by Māori prior to 1840—could not be addressed by the municipal courts. The ruling itself explicitly set precedent for ignoring the Treaty of Waitangi, regarding it a "simple nullity" for domestic law. A landmark ruling, Wi Parata would allow for Crown grants to alienate Māori from their land in the following decades.

In 1877, Wi Parata, a wealthy Māori farmer and member of the Executive Council, described by the Dictionary of New Zealand Biography as having been "an astute politician and skilled orator and debater", took Octavius Hadfield, the Bishop of Wellington, to the Supreme Court (renamed in 1980 to the High Court), over a breach of oral contract between the Anglican Church and the Ngāti Toa, and a breach of the principles of the Treaty of Waitangi.

Ngāti Toa had provided land to the church in 1848 in exchange for a promise that a school for young Ngāti Toa people would be built by the church. However no school was built, and in 1850 the church obtained a Crown grant to the land, without the consent of the iwi. The case was a failure for Parata – Chief Justice James Prendergast ruled that the Treaty of Waitangi was a "simple nullity", having been signed by "primitive barbarians". Prendergast regarded the treaty insignificant to domestic law.

The ruling had far-reaching consequences, as it was invoked as precedent during subsequent claims brought for breaches of the treaty, well into the twentieth century.

== See also ==
- Ngati Apa v Attorney-General – 2003 decision
- R v Symonds – 1847 decision

== Bibliography ==
- "The three precedents of Wi Parata", 2004, Canterbury Law Review
- Morris, Grant (2004). "James Prendergast and the Treaty of Waitangi: Judicial Attitudes to the Treaty During the Latter Half of the Nineteenth Century". Victoria University of Wellington Law Review. 35 (1): 117. doi:10.26686/vuwlr.v35i1.5634.
- Untangling the Foreshore
