= Marine and Coastal Area (Takutai Moana) Act 2011 =

Act of Parliament in New Zealand

Marine and Coastal (Takutai Moana) Act 2011

New Zealand Parliament
- Royal assent: 31 March 2011
- Commenced: 1 April 2011

Legislative history
- Third reading: 24 March 2011

Related legislation
- Foreshore and Seabed Act 2004; Marine and Coastal Area (Takutai Moana) (Customary Marine Title) Amendment Act 2025
- Status: Current legislation

The Marine and Coastal Area (Takutai Moana) Act 2011 is an Act of the New Zealand Parliament created to replace the Foreshore and Seabed Act 2004. It was brought in by the fifth National government and creates a sui generis property class for the marine and coastal area, in which it is vested in no one. This is in contrast to the Foreshore and Seabed Act 2004 in which the foreshore and seabed were vested in the Crown.

== Provisions ==
The Marine and Coastal Area Act:

- Guarantees free public access.
- Makes a common space of the public marine and coastal area, ensuring it can never be sold.
- Protects all existing uses, including recreational fishing and navigation rights.
- Addresses two fundamental rights violated by the Foreshore and Seabed Act – the right to access justice through the courts, and property rights. The Act provides for primarily two types of rights: protected customary rights, and customary marine title.
  - In order to establish protected customary rights, the applicant must show that the right has been exercised since 1840, continues to be exercised in accordance with tikanga Maori, and is not extinguished by law. This is not an interest in land, but a protection of certain customary interests in that land.
  - In order to establish customary marine title, the applicant must show that the area is held in accordance with tikanga Maori and has been exclusively used and occupied since 1840 without substantial interruption. This is an interest in land, but it does not include the right of alienation or disposition.
- Protects, and in some cases extends, rights of vital infrastructure such as ports and aquaculture.

Section 58 of the Act requires applicants seek customary title rights over marine resource consents, conservation, consultation rights over marine mammal watching and coastal policy, and ownership of various minerals and protect objects to prove they have "exclusively used and occupied it from 1840 to the present day without substantial interruption". These rights cannot be sold and have no effect on public access, fishing and other recreational activities.

== Legislative history ==
The Marine and Coastal Area Act 2011 replaced the controversial Foreshore and Seabed Act 2004, which was introduced by the Fifth Labour Government. Māori Party co-leader Dame Tariana Turia, who left Labour and established the Māori Party largely as a response to the Foreshore and Seabed Act 2004, began the third reading of the Bill in the House of Representatives on 24 March 2011. In expressing the support of the Māori Party, she noted, "This bill is another step in our collective pursuit of Treaty injustice. ... This bill was never just about the Māori Party; it started with the leadership of the eight iwi who took an application to the Maori Land Court at the top of the South Island",referring to the Ngati Apa case.

On 24 March 2011, the bill was passed at third reading by a vote of 63 to 56. It received royal assent on 31 March and came into force on 1 April. It was supported by the National, the Māori Party, and United Future, while the Labour, the Greens, ACT, the Progressive Party and Hone Harawira voted against it. This Act was the key reason why Harawira left the Māori Party. In a press statement released on 23 February 2011, in which Harawira announced he was leaving the Māori Party, he stated "I did not lead the 2004 Foreshore and Seabed March from Te Rerenga Wairua to Parliament that gave birth to the Māori Party, to see it destroyed by infighting 5 years later".

Green Party co-leader Metiria Turei opposed the legislation and argued that it represented just "how much of a failure the Maori Party-National negotiations have been over trying to resolve the inherent injustices that were put in place by New Zealand First and Labour in 2004. Those injustices remain. The failed principles are still in place in this legislation... just as they were in 2004. It is a great disappointment." The Act Party also opposed the legislation, and unsuccessfully attempted to delay the passage of the bill by lodging hundreds of questions with the Speaker.

== Responses ==
=== 2020 Waitangi Tribunal ruling ===
In late June 2020 the Waitangi Tribunal found the act breached the Treaty of Waitangi. The Tribunal found the Act failed to provide adequate and timely information about the Crown engagement pathway for applicants, and that it had breached its Treaty Duty of active protection by not funding all reasonable costs incurred by the applicant.

=== 2025 customary threshold amendment ===
In late July 2024, Treaty Negotiations Minister Paul Goldsmith announced that the Sixth National Government would disregard a 2023 New Zealand Court of Appeal ruling that lowered the threshold for proving Māori customary marine title claims under the Marine and Coastal Area (Takutai Moana) Act 2011. Goldsmith announce that the Government would amend section 58 of the Act to require marine title claimants to prove they had continual exclusive use and ownership of the area since 1840. This proposed law change was part of National's coalition agreement with the New Zealand First party. This announcement preceded a meeting between Goldsmith, Oceans Fisheries Minister Shane Jones and seafood industry leaders in May 2024 to discuss industry concerns about Māori customary marine titles and claims.

In late August 2024, the Waitangi Tribunal commenced an urgent inquiry into the Government's plans to change the law to tighten the threshold for Māori customary marine title claims. The hearing was heard by Maori Land Court Judge Miharo Armstrong along with Tribunal members Ron Crosby and Pou Temara. On the first day, Treaty of Waitangi lawyer Tom Bennion criticised the Government for its perceived "two-faced" approach towards Māori and seeking to undermine Māori customary marine claims. Northland iwi (tribe) Ngātiwai chairperson Aperahama Kerepeti-Edwards criticised the National Government for not consulting with Māori over customary rights. On the second day, the Tribunal heard testimony from Te Arawhiti (Office for Māori Crown Relations) deputy secretary Tui Marsh, who had attended the 21 May meeting between cabinet ministers and seafood industry representatives.

On 13 September 2024, the Waitangi Tribunal released its initial report into the proposed changes to the legislation. The Tribunal found that the Government had ignored official advice, failed to consult with Māori and breached several principles including active protection and good governance. In October 2024, the Attorney-General Judith Collins appealed the Court of Appeal's 2023 decision to lower the threshold for proving Māori customary foreshore and seabed claims to the Supreme Court of New Zealand. On 2 December, the Supreme Court upheld the Attorney-General's appeal, ruling that the lower court had erred in its approach to interpreting the threshold within the framework of the Marine and Coastal Area (Takutai Moana) Act 2011.

On 24 September 2024, the Government's Marine and Coastal Area (Takutai Moana) (Customary Marine Title) Amendment Bill passed its first reading on 24 September 2024 and was referred to the justice select committee. Despite dissent from the Labour and Green parties, the committee recommended that the bill proceed through the legislative process on 3 December 2024. On 22 October 2025, the MACA amendment bill passed its third reading, becoming law. The bill was supported by the governing National, ACT and New Zealand First parties but was opposed by the opposition Labour, Green parties and Te Pāti Māori, which vowed to repeal the legislation if they formed the next government.

== See also ==
- New Zealand foreshore and seabed controversy
