= Radical title =

Ultimate right by The Crown to deal with land

Radical title is a concept in English common law that refers to the Crown's underlying title to all land held in overseas plantations and colonies. It grants the Crown the power to alienate others from land and to transfer beneficial ownership of the land to itself or others, but by itself does not grant beneficial ownership.

== Australia ==
While not the first time radical title was mentioned, the concept came to prominence in Australian law in the case of Mabo v Queensland (No 2), which recognised the existence of native title under Australian law. Radical title was used to explain how native title rights could co-exist with the doctrine of tenure, under which all rights to land ultimately derive from grants from the Crown and are not absolute. The court declared that on acquisition of sovereignty by the British in 1788, the Crown did not acquire beneficial ownership over all the land the country but a mere radical title to it. This radical title did not extinguish native title, allowing the court to recognise it at the time of the judgment while also recognising the doctrine of tenure. All land grants subsequently made by the Crown were subject to tenure, but native title rights, having existed before acquisition of sovereignty, were not.

== See also ==
- Allodial title
