= Foreshore and Seabed Act 2004 =

Former New Zealand law

New Zealand Parliament
- Royal assent: 24 November 2004

Repeals
- Marine and Coastal Area (Takutai Moana) Act 2011, Section 5
- Status: Repealed

The Foreshore and Seabed Act 2004 was an Act of Parliament in New Zealand that overruled the 2003 decision of the Court of Appeal in Ngati Apa v Attorney-General. Its passage arose out of, and further fueled, the New Zealand foreshore and seabed controversy. It was repealed and replaced by the Marine and Coastal Area (Takutai Moana) Act in 2011.

== Background ==
Since the signing of the Treaty of Waitangi in 1840, Māori and the New Zealand Crown have disagreed over indigenous claims to New Zealand's foreshore and seabed. In 1997, local Māori in the Marlborough Sounds applied to the Māori Land Court for a determination of the local foreshore and seabed as Māori customary land. Their application for a judicial review had been prompted by their long-standing exclusion from the local commercial mussel farming industry. Before the Land Court could release its decision, the High Court of New Zealand ruled that foreshore purchased by the Crown from Māori negated indigenous ownership and that the Crown had always owned the seabed. This decision was subsequently overturned by the Court of Appeal of New Zealand, which ruled in 2002 that the case should be heard at the Māori Land Court.

== The act ==
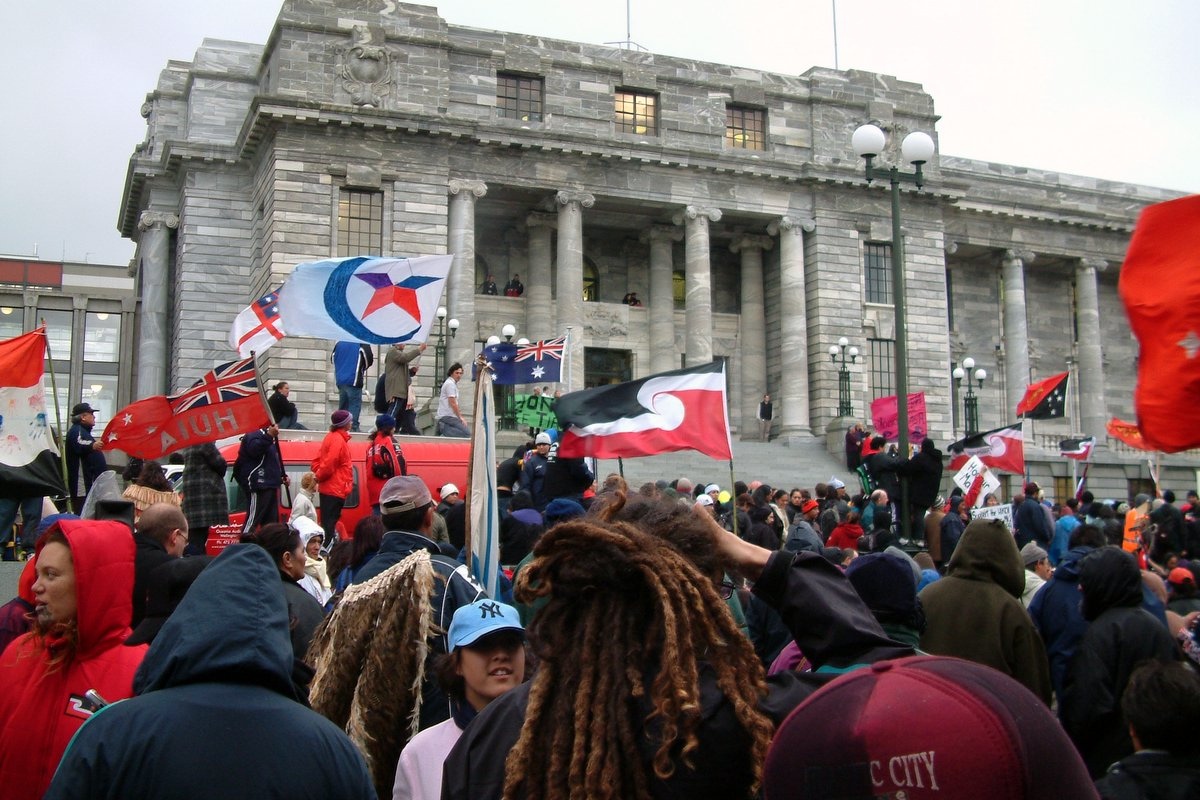
Protest against the Foreshore and Seabed bill in May 2004

The Fifth Labour Government passed the contentious Foreshore and Seabed Act in 2004. Its passage was prompted by pressure from Labour's coalition partner New Zealand First and the opposition National Party, who claimed that the Court of Appeal's ruling would cause non-Māori New Zealanders to lose access to beaches, fishing grounds and harbours.

The act stated that the New Zealand Crown owned public foreshore and seabed including areas owned by local authorities. This law excluded 256 privately owned foreshore and seabed parcels. It codified public access to the foreshore and seabed for recreational and navigational purposes.

It also allowed the Māori Land Court and High Court of New Zealand to protect non-territorial customary rights over public foreshore and seabed that had been exercised since 1840. The law allowed any group to claim customary rights if they had been occupying and using a part of the public foreshore and seabed exclusively since 1840, and had held continuous title to contiguous land. These rights could be established either by the High Court or through a negotiated settlement with the Crown that was established by a High Court ruling. Once these rights had been established, plaintiffs could establish a foreshore and seabed reserve or apply to the New Zealand Crown for redress.

== Opposition and repeal ==
Labour's role in the passage of the act alienated many Māori, including Labour cabinet minister Tariana Turia, who resigned from the party and founded the Māori Party with the help of educationalist Pita Sharples. The Māori Party gained four Māori seats in the House of Representatives in the 2005 general election, and five at the 2008 general election. They formed a confidence and supply agreement with the Fifth National Government in 2008.

In 2011, the Fifth National Government, with the support of the Māori Party, replaced the Foreshore and Seabed Act with the Marine and Coastal Area (Takutai Moana) Act 2011. This new law replaced Crown ownership of the foreshore and seabed with a "no ownership" regime. Crucially, it allowed Māori iwi to apply to the courts or Crown for customary rights and ownership over certain areas of the foreshore and seabed.

== Sources ==
- Belgrave, Michael (2024). Becoming Aotearoa: A New History of New Zealand. Auckland: Massey University Press. ISBN 9780995131866.
