= Ngati Apa v Attorney-General =

Indigenous rights case of New Zealand's Court of Appeal

- Court: Court of Appeal of New Zealand
- Full case name: Ngati Apa & Anor v. Attorney-General & Others
- Decided: 19 June 2003
- Citation: [2003] NZCA 117; [2003] 3 NZLR 643
- Transcript: Available here

Case history
- Prior action: [2002] 2 NZLR 661 (HC)

Court membership
- Judges sitting: Elias CJ, Gault P, Keith, Tipping & Anderson JJ

Keywords
- Foreshore and seabed, Aboriginal title, Te Ture Whenua Maori Act 1993

Ngati Apa v Attorney-General was a landmark legal decision that sparked the New Zealand foreshore and seabed controversy. The case arose from an application by eight northern South Island iwi for orders declaring the foreshore and seabed of the Marlborough Sounds Maori customary land. After lower court decisions and consequent appeals in the Maori Land Court, the Maori Appellate Court and the High Court; the Court of Appeal unanimously held that the Maori Land Court had jurisdiction to determine whether areas of foreshore and seabed were Maori customary land or not. The court also held that, "The transfer of sovereignty did not affect customary property. They are interests preserved by the common law until extinguished in accordance with the law". The effect of the decision was subsequently overturned by the Foreshore and Seabed Act 2004.

== Background ==
Justice Keith succinctly summarised how the case got before the Court of Appeal,

[126] Ngati Apa, Ngati Koata, Ngati Kuia, Ngati Rarua, Ngati Tama, Ngati Toa, Rangitane and Te Atiawa applied to the Maori Land Court for an order that certain land is customary Maori land. The land is the foreshore and seabed of the Marlborough Sounds. The area includes seabed under waters within the Sounds, such as Pelorus Sound and Port Underwood, and under waters on the seaward side of the land such as the west coast of D’Urville Island. [127] Judge Hingston in the Maori Land Court gave an interim decision on a preliminary question favouring the iwi. The Attorney-General and others appealed to the Maori Appellate Court which then stated questions of law for the High Court. Ellis J in the High Court answered the questions favourably to the appellants. The iwi appeal to this Court.

== Judgments ==
The lowest common denominator of the four judgments is “crystal clear”: property rights cannot be extinguished by a “side wind”."

=== Elias CJ ===
Chief Justice Sian Elias addressed four main points in her judgment.

Firstly, Elias CJ addressed the issue of who at common law owned the foreshore and seabed and held,

Any prerogative of the Crown as to property in foreshore and seabed as a matter of English common law in 1840 cannot apply in New Zealand if displaced by local circumstances. Maori custom and usage recognising property in foreshore and seabed lands displaces any English Crown Prerogative and is effective as a matter of New Zealand law, unless such property interests have been lawfully extinguished. The existence and extent of any such customary property interest is determined in application of tikanga. That is a matter for the Maori Land Court to consider on application to it or on reference by the High Court. Whether any such interests have been extinguished is a matter of law.

— Elias CJ, Ngati Apa v Attorney-General

In response to arguments by the Crown that there is a presumption of Crown ownership of the foreshore and seabed, Elias CJ cites a number of examples of nineteenth century legislation and evidence from Chief Justice Fenton acknowledging Maori customary rights below the low water mark.

Secondly, the judgment rejected the argument that the Maori Land Court did not have jurisdiction to determine the status of the foreshore and seabed because this area is not land. Elias CJ notes that, "Both lake beds and river beds have been the subject of claims to the Maori Land Court without jurisdictional impediment [...]. Much legislation concerned with “land” applies to seabed and foreshore".

Thirdly, Elias CJ dismisses suggestions by the Crown that Maori customary interests have been expropriated by the Harbour Acts, Territorial Seas Acts or Resource Management Act.

Finally, the judgment dealt with the precedent created in In Re the Ninety-Mile Beach [1963] NZLR 461 (CA) that, "any Maori customary property in the foreshore had been extinguished once the contiguous land above high water mark had lost the status of Maori customary land". Elias CJ held, "an approach which precludes investigation of the fact of entitlement according to custom because of an assumption that custom is displaced by a change in sovereignty or because the sea was used as a boundary for individual titles on the shore is wrong in law."

=== Gault P ===
The judgment of President Gault is the only dissent from the majority's overruling of In Re the Ninety-Mile Beach. Gault P's argument is that,

Some of the reasoning in the judgments in the Ninety-Mile Beach case is open to criticism and the second of the conclusions stated in the preceding paragraph should be viewed as subject to the facts of particular cases. But I consider that those conclusions are consistent with the intended application of the provisions of the successive Native Lands Acts. Interests in native lands bordering the sea, after investigation by the Native Land Court (which encompassed ascertaining interests of any other complainants), were extinguished and substituted with grants in fee simple. It does not seem open now to find that there could have been strips of land between the claimed land bordering the sea and the sea that were not investigated and in which interests were not identified and extinguished once Crown grants were made.

— Gault P, Ngati Apa v Attorney-General

However Gault P notes that if land investigated by the Native Land Court was described as not bordering the sea, the Maori Land Court would have jurisdiction to rule on the status of the strip between land and sea.

=== Keith and Anderson JJ ===
The decision of Keith and Anderson JJ was delivered by Justice Keith. The judgment of Keith and Anderson JJ concurs with that of Elias CJ that at common law pre-existing native title and rights continues to exist despite the conferring of radical title in the Crown. The judgment also notes that under New Zealand property law, "property in sea areas could be held by individuals and would in general be subject to public rights such as rights of navigation". On In Re the Ninety Mile Beach, their judgment also notes that it is wrongly decided; "Whether the foreshore was also investigated and was determined to be the Crown's in the course of a particular process is a matter of fact, not a matter to be assumed." On the Territorial Sea Acts they additionally observe, "legislative measures claimed to extinguish indigenous property and rights must be clear and plain".

=== Tipping J ===
Justice Tipping joined with the majority of the court in overturning In Re the Ninety Mile Beach, and with the whole of the court in declaring that there was no barrier stopping the Maori Land Court from investigating Maori customary rights in the foreshore and seabed.

Tipping J restates the problem with the reasoning in In Re the Ninety Mile Beach,

[207] The learned Judge proceeded, however, in his next paragraph to say that:“. . . the rights of the Maoris to their tribal lands depended wholly on the grace and favour of Her Majesty Queen Victoria, who had an absolute right to disregard the Native title to any lands in New Zealand, whether above high water mark or below high water mark.”
[208] It is at this point that I consider, with respect, that His Honour's reasoning started to go wrong. Maori customary title was, as I have already discussed, not a matter of grace and favour but of common law. Having become part of the common law of New Zealand, it could not be ignored by the Crown unless and until Parliament had clearly extinguished it, and then only subject to whatever might have been put in its place.

— Tipping J, Ngati Apa v Attorney-General
