= List of unofficial observances in New Zealand =

Apart from the public holidays in New Zealand, usually celebrated by a paid day off work, there are a number of unofficial observances in New Zealand that are celebrated for days, weeks or months. Most of these are international in nature. They range from established traditions of major world religions to spoofs such as Talk Like A Pirate Day.

== Days ==
- Chinese New Year, January/February (varies)
- Valentine's Day, 14 February
- Loud Shirt Day, 24 February
  (2023, No information available for 2022)
- Children's Day, first Sunday in March
- International Women's Day, 8 March
- Walk To Work Day, second Wednesday of March
- World Sleep Day, 15 March
- Saint Patrick's Day, 17 March
- Race Relations Day, 22 March
- World Haemophilia Day, 17 April
- April Fools' Day, 1 April
- World Book Day, 23 April
- Poppy Day, Friday before 25 April (Anzac Day)
- J Day, 3 May
- Sleep Apnea Awareness Day, 5 May
- Mother's Day, second Sunday in May
- Pink Shirt Day, third Friday in May
- World No Tobacco Day, 31 May
- Eid al-Fitr (varies)
- World Refugee Day, 20 June
- Shades for Migraine, 21 June
- National Disco Day, 2 July
- International Day of Indigenous People, 9 August
- World Youth Day, 12 August
- Daffodil Day (Cancer Society Fundraiser), last Friday of August
- Random Acts of Kindness Day, 1 September
- Father's Day, first Sunday in September
- eDay 12 September
- Wig Wednesday 13 September (Child Cancer)
- Māori Language Day 14 September
- Suffrage Day, 19 September
- International Talk Like a Pirate Day, 19 September
- Pink Ribbon Day (Breast Cancer Awareness), 8 October
- World Arthritis Day, 12 October
- Rā Maumahara (New Zealand Wars Remembrance Day), 28 October (also the anniversary of the New Zealand Declaration of Independence)
- World Stroke Day, 29 October
- Halloween, 31 October
- Gumboot Friday, First Friday every November
- Diwali, 3 November
- Melbourne Cup Day, first Tuesday of November
- NZDA National Oral Health Day, first Friday of November
- Guy Fawkes Night, 5 November
- Premature Awareness Day, 17 November
- World day for the Prevention of Abuse and Violence Against Children, 19 November
- White Ribbon Day (for the Elimination of Violence against Women), 25 November
- Red Ribbon Day (AIDS Awareness), 1 December
- Crate Day, first Saturday of December
- International Day of Disabled Persons, 3 December
- World Volunteers Day, 5 December
- World Human Rights Day, 10 December

== Weeks ==
Many of these national weeks change from year to year.

- Sea Week, 27 Feb – 6 March
- Multiples Awareness Week, 28 Feb – 6 March
- Global Public Health Week, 3–7 April 2023
- Perinatal Mental Health Awareness Week, from 1 May
- Rotuman Language Week, 7–13 May
- New Zealand Sign Language Week, from 2 May
- National Organic Week – 1–7 May
- Youth Week, 21–29 May
- Samoan Language Week, 30 May – 5 June
- Coeliac Awareness Week, 18–24 June
- NZ Volunteering Week 19–25 June 2016
- Kiribati Language Week, 9–15 July
- Cook Islands Language Week, 30 July – 5 August
- Rail Safety Week, August
- New Zealand Islam Awareness, from 2 August
- New Zealand Fashion Week 29 August – 2 September
- Tongan language Week, 3–9 September
- Child Safeguarding Week, 7–13 September 2026
- Te Wiki o te Reo Māori (Māori Language Week), in the week which includes 14 September.
- New Zealand Conservation Week, 10–18 September
- National Clean Up Week 17–24 September
- Mental Health Awareness Week, late September
- New Zealand Chinese Language Week, typically the third or fourth week of September
- Tuvalu Language Week, 1–7 October
- Fijian Language Week, 8–14 October
- Niue Language Week, 15–21 October
- Tokelau Language Week, 22–28 October
- Grandparents Week from 27 October – 1 November
- Get Outdoors Week 16–24 November
- Fraud Awareness Week, third week of November
- Sleep Awareness Week
- Cloth Nappy Week April
- Rail Safety Week
- NZ Flowers Week

== Months ==
- Ovarian Cancer Awareness Month 1–28 February
- New Zealand Bike to Work month – February
- Pride Month – February (Auckland), March (Wellington, Christchurch, Dunedin)
- Endometriosis Awareness Month – March
- Brain Injury Awareness Month – March
- Sexual Assault Awareness Month – April
- NZ Music Month – May
- Migraine Awareness Month – June
- NZ Book Month September from 2006 to 2008, October in 2009, March from 2011 to 2013 and August in 2014; not held in 2015
- Sorted Money Month – August
- Gynaecological Cancer Awareness Month 1–30 September
- Movember Month – November
