= Level crossings in New Zealand =

There are over 3,000 level crossings in New Zealand, with about 1,330 being publicly maintained by KiwiRail as of 2013. Of these, 275 level crossings were protected by flashing red lights, bells, and half-arm barriers; and 421 level crossings are protected by flashing red lights and bells only. The remainder are controlled by "Stop & Give Way" signs. Level crossings are the responsibility of rail infrastructure owner KiwiRail Network, the NZ Transport Agency, and if the crossing is on a local road, the local city or district council. Much like Australia, New Zealand employs American-made crossing warning equipment. There were also in 2013 some 110 stand-alone public pedestrian level crossings; and some private level crossings, which are the responsibility of the land owner.

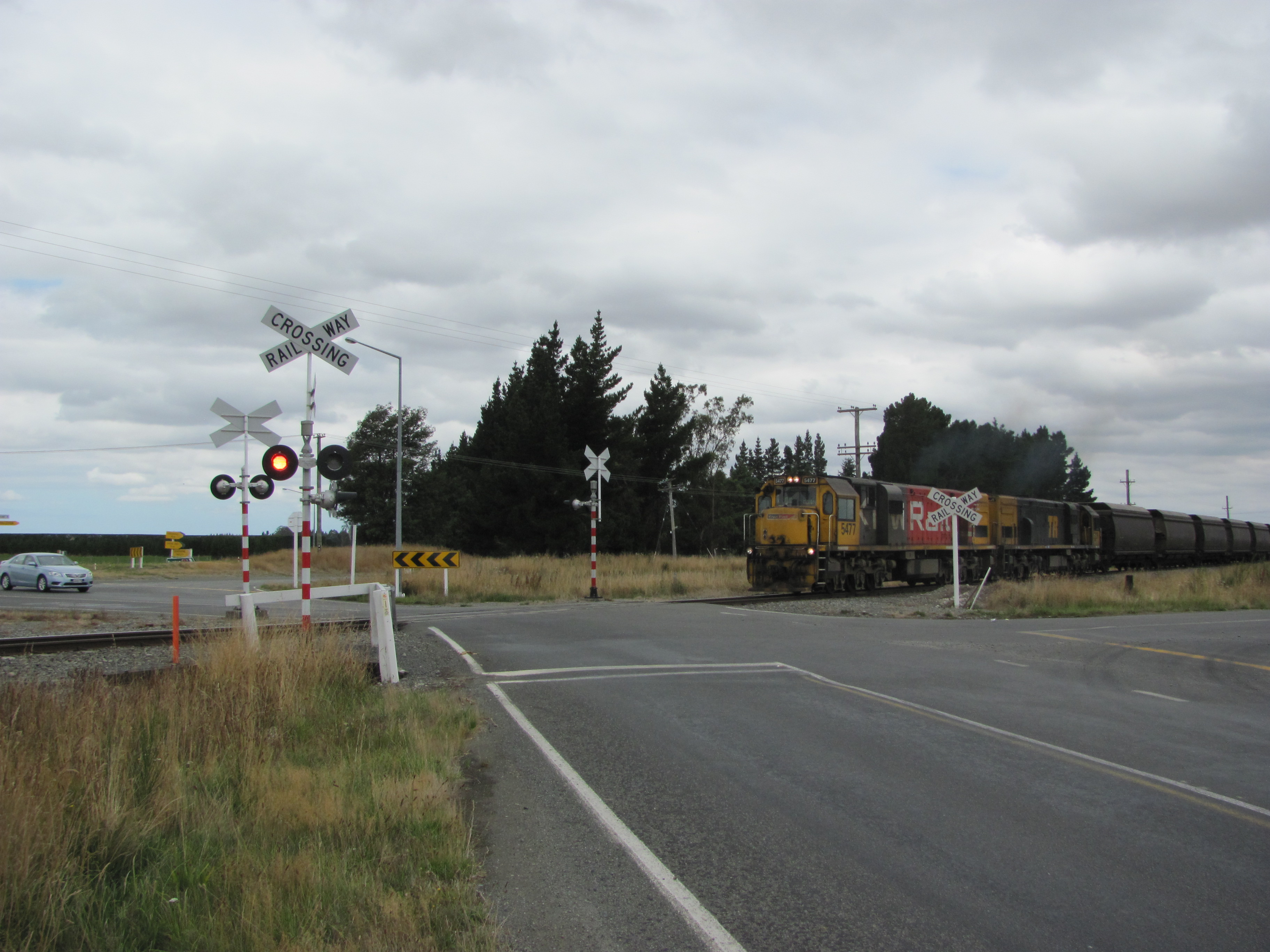
A coal train approaching a controlled level crossing near Aylesbury, New Zealand

In 2010, the government contributed $1 million per year to upgrading level crossings.

In 2023, Auckland Transport said that it proposed to close or upgrade all 45 level crossings in Auckland within 30 years, and with an increase in the frequency of suburban trains some level crossings could be closed for up to 45 minutes per hour in the peak period.

== Private and heritage railways ==
On the Taieri Gorge Railway in rural South Island, roads and railways share the same bridge when crossing a river, with the railway line in the road. Motorists, as well as giving way to oncoming traffic if required (the bridges have one lane) must ensure that the bridge is clear of a train, end to end, before starting to cross the bridge. For safety, trains are limited to 10 km/h (6 mph) while crossing the bridges. There are only two bridges on the Taieri Gorge Railway where this is the case.

== History ==
The first railway in New Zealand was the short Ferrymead Railway from Christchurch in 1863 (see NZ Rail 150), but laying of new lines was slow until the Vogel Era when some thousand miles (1,600 km) of track was laid in seven years from 1874. Lines were initially basic, with improvements made as traffic increased (in the American pattern). Level crossings were preceded by a warning sign only. See photo of Johnsonville railway station c1910 with level crossing in foreground.

When stock droving or moving sheep and cattle on foot was usual, level crossings had a cattle stock (grid) to stop sheep and cattle wandering onto the line, but with increasing use of trucks they began to disappear in the 1960s and the few left will go with track renewal or replacement.

In the early 20th century, warning devices were introduced on trial; wig-wams or flag indicators with bells or gongs (about 38 installed). They were American (from the Union Switch and Signalling Co or Griswold Signal Co), British (Westinghouse Brake and Signal Co, London) and locally designed ones with contra-rotating arms and a gong from Pearson in Wanganui (about 18 installed). Flashing light and bell alarms became standard; American-style K relays then Westinghouse style A. In 1907, a witness to a suburban crossing accident in Kingsland, Auckland described the whistle warning from the engine as too short and not loud enough.

In 1954, there were 2,400 level crossings. The first automatic half-arm barrier had been installed at Māngere, Auckland, with another ten to be installed ‘’in the near future’’. By March 1964, when NZR had about four crossings per ten kilometres, there were red crossing lights at 469 sites and half-arm barriers at 28 sites (all but one multi-track). On single-track lines a 22-second warning period is used (the original 100 second period encouraged motorists to ‘’take risks’’). For multiple-tracks the period is 25 seconds plus 2 seconds for each additional track. Outer approach track circuits 1200m from the crossing are used so that the alarms do not go off and then go on again for a second train on another track. Sometimes a “SECOND TRAIN COMING ” sign also flashes.

In 1924, a motorcyclist in Christchurch was fined for ignoring a crossing-keeper when a shunting engine was approaching the crossing.

In 1955, the Minister of Railways John McAlpine intervened to have barriers installed at a busy Riccarton crossing in Christchurch.

A level crossing near Gisborne, sees the Palmerston North - Gisborne Line cross one of Gisborne Airport's runways. Aircraft landing on sealed 1310-metre runway 14L/32R are signalled with two red flashing lights on either side of the runway and a horizontal bar of flashing red lights to indicate the runway south of the railway line is closed, and may only land on the 866 metres (2,841 ft) section of the runway north of the railway line. When the full length of the runway is open, a vertical bar of green lights signals to the aircraft, with regular railway signals on either side of the runway indicating trains to stop. This crossing is in regular use by the Gisborne City Vintage Railway.

In 2018, KiwiRail decided to cease turning off some warning bells between 10.30 pm and 7 am because of the number of "near misses" with pedestrians.

In 2019, KiwiRail changed the rate of flashing lights at level crossings from 85 fpm (flashes per minute) to the standard laid down by the "American Railway Engineering and Maintenance-of-Way Association" of 50 fpm so that a new order for level crossing equipment did not have non-standard requirements. In 2019 for Rail Safety Week, KiwiRail installed 'near miss memorials' at level crossings, which were half crosses with a QR code on them linking to a video of a real near miss and a story on how it impacted the train driver.

In 2021, there were calls to fast-track upgrades to Wairarapa crossings at Carterton and Featherston after fatal level crossing accidents; the commuter Wairarapa Connection is to run more frequently.

In 2023, Kiwirail said that ten people had died due to train collisions in the last year, with 80% being in level crossing. There were also 40 train collisions with people or vehicles, and 305 near misses.

A KiwiRail proposal to close five level crossings in the Wairarapa regarded as hazardous aroused mass local opposition. At a Wairarapa level crossing where a woman was seriously injured, police ticketed sixteen drivers in one day! Objections were also raised in 2024 to KiwiRail's estimated cost of keeping a Masterton crossing open. In October 2024, Kiwirail confirmed that four crossings in the Wairarapa District would be permanently closed in 2025, with the fate of the Judds Road, Masterton crossing still undecided and deferred until 2026.

In Christchurch a KiwiRail demand to close an adjacent cycleway until the Scruttons Road level crossing in Heathcote is upgraded at a cost to ratepayers of $6.5 million (original estimate $2 million; and still at grade) has also aroused opposition.

== Accidents and incidents ==
Near-misses are common in Auckland and Wellington where there are frequent commuter trains on double-tracks where a train may be followed by another train in the opposite direction (sometimes a non-stop freight train). At some crossings, pedestrian gates have been added, which lock automatically when a train is approaching.

KiwiRail runs a public campaign educating the public on rail safety. It is known as the Rail Safety Week, which runs in the second week of August every year.

Level crossing accidents and incidents fall within the scope of the Transport Accident Investigation Commission (TAIC) as railway accident investigator.

== See also ==
- Boom barrier
- Crossbucks
- Wigwag (railroad)
