= Level crossing signals =

Devices used to warn pedestrians and drivers of incoming trains at level crossings

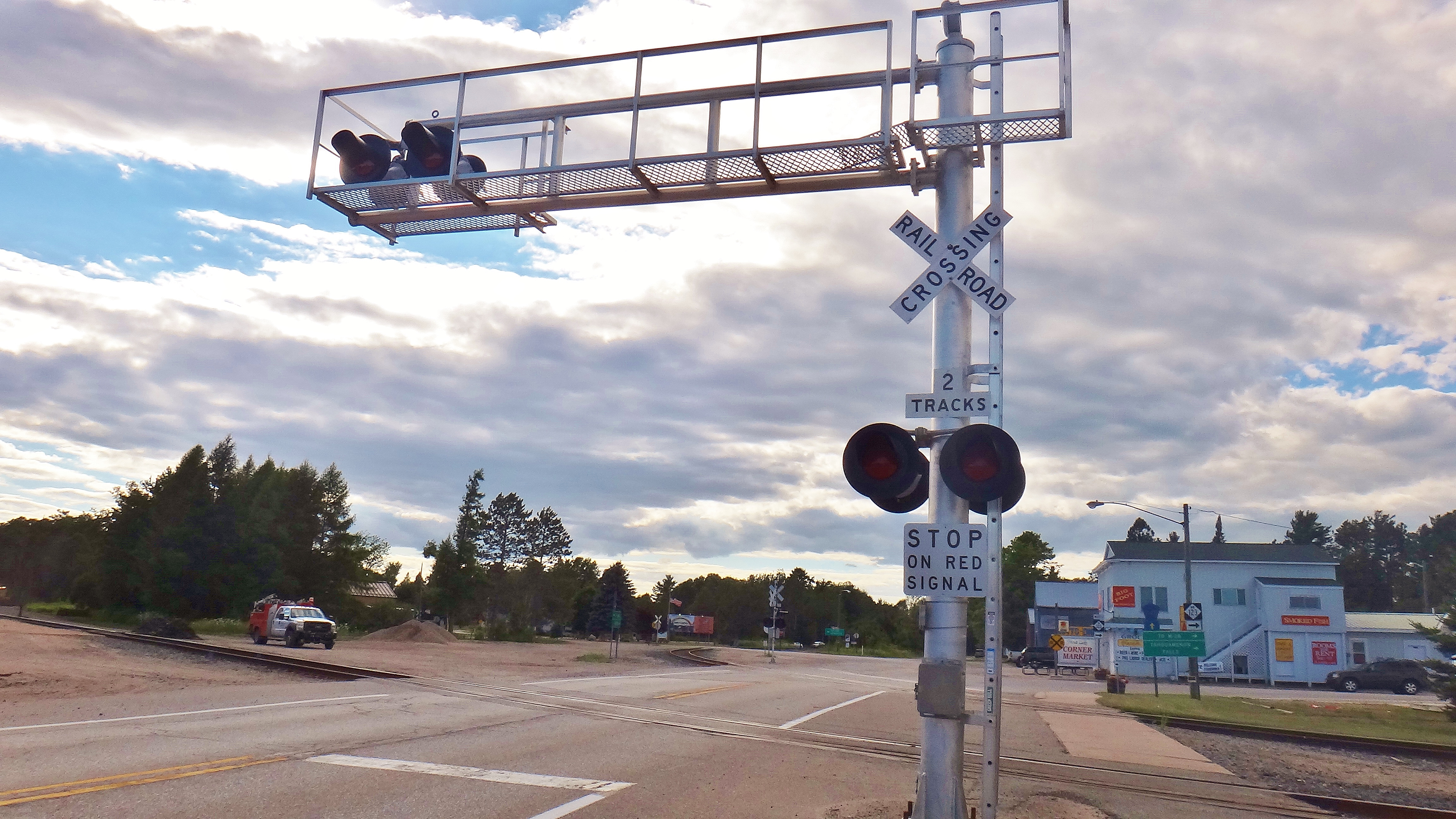
Signal device with flashing lights mounted on a cantilever, on the Soo Line in Trout Lake, Michigan, July 2015

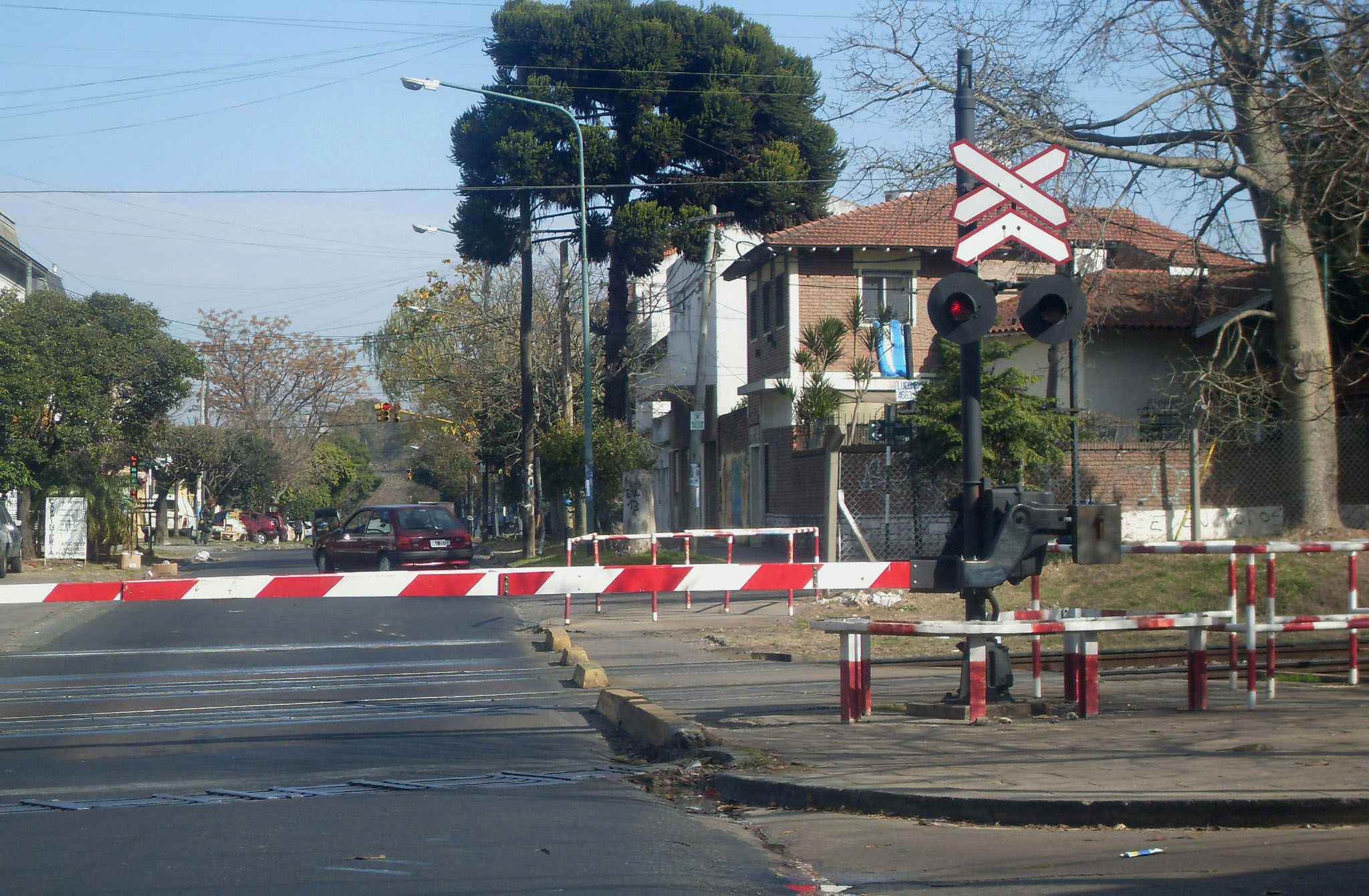
GRS signal and barrier on Argentine Belgrano Norte Line, Florida Oeste, July 2012

Level crossing signals are electronic warning devices for road vehicles at railroad level crossings.

Level crossings can be operated in various ways. In some countries such as the UK, the warning devices are more often than not activated by remote control, i.e. an operator pressing buttons. However, the majority of countries have automated systems.

Automated level crossings are found in most developed nations and vary greatly, but this page in particular is specific to the United States. Such equipment works as follows:

The basic signal consists of flashing red lights, a crossbuck and an alarm (either a bell, a speaker that mimics a bell sound or an electronic siren), attached to a mast. At most crossings, the signals will activate about 30 seconds before the train arrives but there are sensors measuring speed so that the crossing knows when to activate; so, the slower the train is, the longer the delay and the faster the train is, the earlier the crossing activates. In some countries (such as the Czech Republic or Slovakia) there is also a flashing white light, which means that it is possible to pass the level crossing at a higher speed than generally allowed.

At many crossings, there will be a barrier (or "gate" in the US) added to the signal, which descends over the road and blocks entry. The barriers will be fully lowered 15 to 20 seconds before the train arrives (US), and will rise and the signals will shut off once the end of the train clears the island circuit.

Automatic crossings generally have no or half-width barriers to prevent cars and pedestrians from becoming trapped on the tracks with no escape, and manually operated crossings have full-width barriers (either 2 or 4 arms which block the whole road). However, a number of counties automate fully closed crossings anyway despite the obvious dangers; however, many such crossings are accompanied by obstacle detection sensors to ensure the tracks are clear.

The time interval may be controlled by a level crossing predictor, an electronic device which is connected to the rails of a railroad track, and activates the crossing's warning devices (lights, bells, gates, etc.) at a consistent interval prior to the arrival of a train at a level crossing.

Crossbucks also may have legends saying, for example: "RAIL ROAD CROSSING" (United States), "RAIL WAY CROSSING" (Australia and New Zealand), "PELIGRO FERROCARRIL" (Latin America, meaning DANGER RAILWAY), or be wordless (Canada and many other countries).

Many states in the US are now requiring the use of this type of equipment at all newly constructed level crossings.

== History ==
=== First devices ===
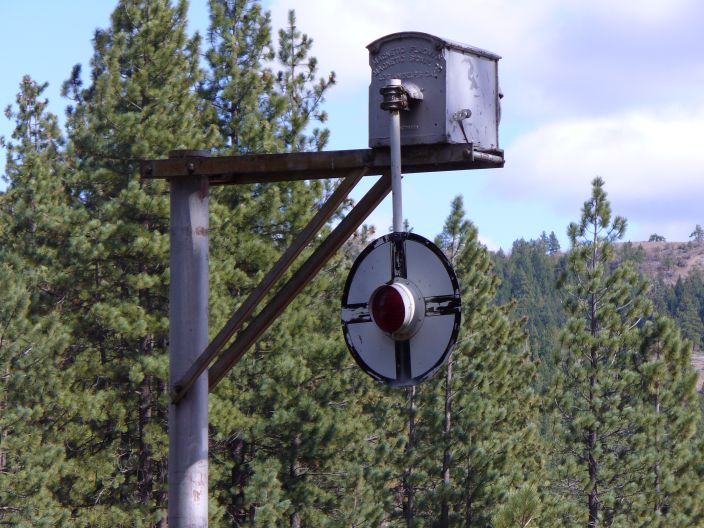
"Wigwag" signal photographed in 2007

"Wigwag" was the nickname given to a type of crossing signals once common in North America, named for the pendulum-like motion it used to signal the approach of a train. Albert Hunt, a mechanical engineer at Southern California's Pacific Electric (PE) interurban streetcar railroad, invented it in 1909 for safer railroad level crossings. He utilized alternating electromagnets pulling on an iron armature. A red steel target disc, slightly less than two feet in diameter, serving as a pendulum was attached. A red light in the center of the target illuminated, and with each swing of the target a mechanical gong sounded.

The new model, combining sight, motion and sound was dubbed the "Magnetic Flagman" and produced by the Magnetic Signal Company.

=== Modern devices ===
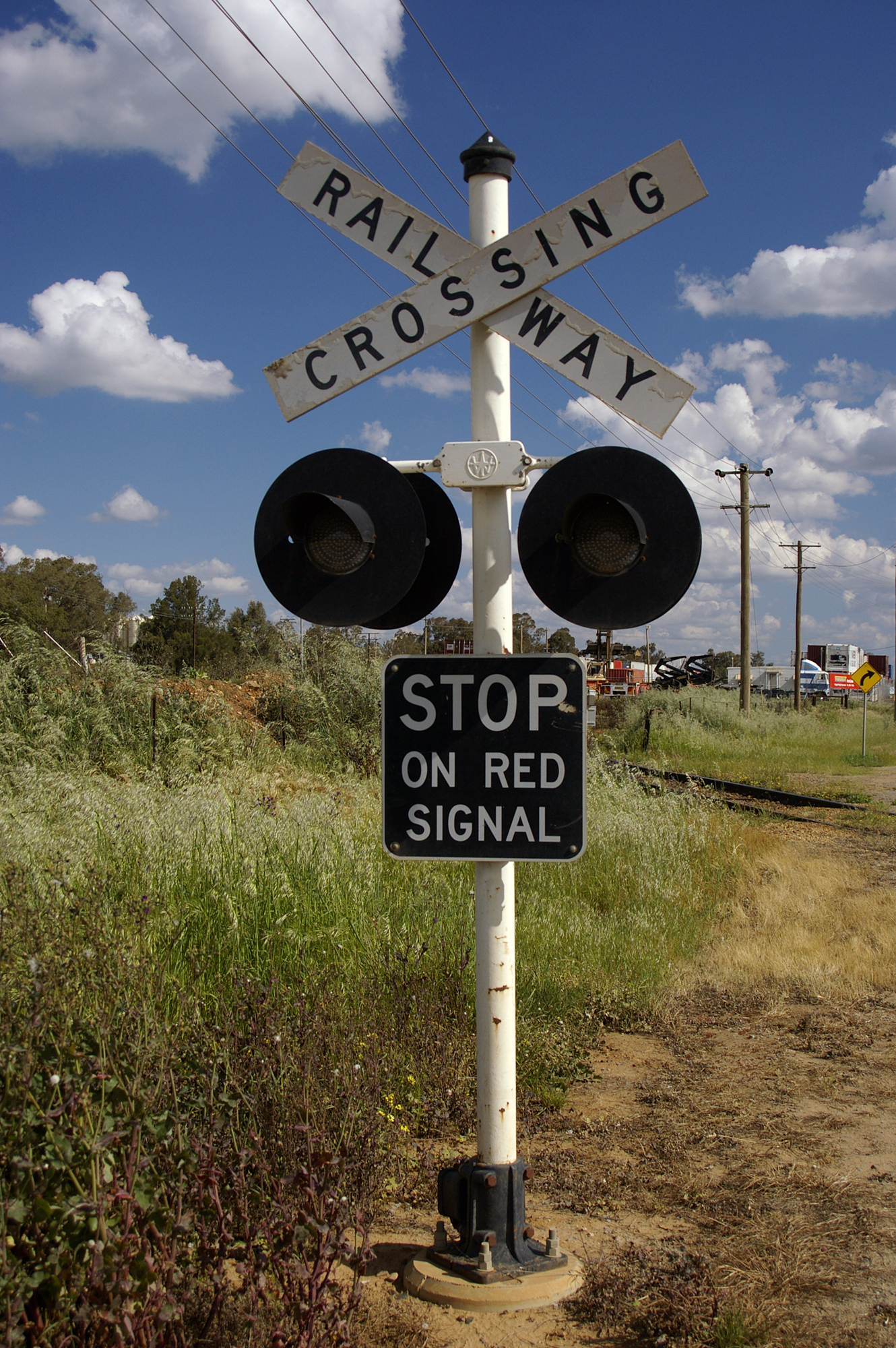
Warning device in Australia, pictured in October 2009

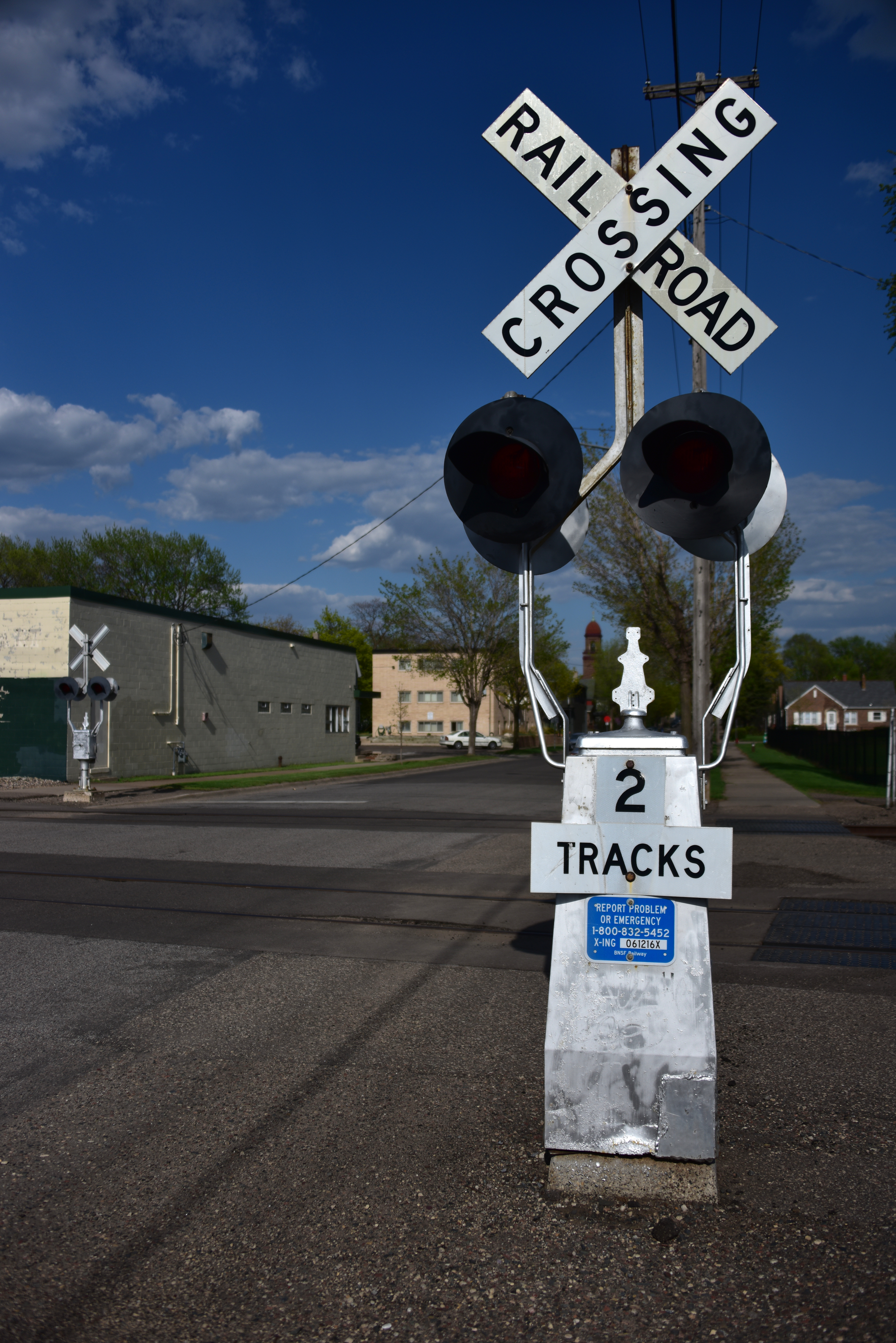
Griswold rail crossing signals in Northeast, Minneapolis. July 2018

First developed in concept by the Stanford Research Institute in the late 1950s at the request of the Southern Pacific Company (the Southern Pacific Railroad, now merged into the Union Pacific Railroad), and patented in 1966, the design goal of the level crossing predictor was to provide a consistent warning time for trains approaching a level crossing.

Before this invention, the circuits used for activating a crossing's warning devices were very simple, activated whenever a train came within a fixed distance (hundreds or thousands of feet) of the crossing. This method required that the crossing be designed to accommodate a train approaching at the track speed limit, which leads to longer warning times for trains approaching the crossing at lower speeds. Very slow trains could have many minutes of warning time, thus delaying highway traffic unnecessarily.

=== Technology ===
All level crossing predictors rely on the changes in the electrical characteristics of the rails that occur as a train approaches the point at which the predictor is connected to the rails (the feedpoint). A railroad track occupied by a train or other electrical shunt can be viewed as a single-turn inductor shaped like a hairpin. As the train approaches the feedpoint, the area enclosed by the inductor diminishes, thus reducing the inductance.

This inductance can be measured by connecting a constant-current alternating current source to the rails, and measuring the voltage which results. By Ohm's law, the voltage measured will be proportional to the impedance. The absolute magnitude of this voltage and its rate of change can then be used to compute the amount of time remaining before the train arrives at the crossing, assuming it is running at a constant speed.

The crossing's warning devices are activated when the computed time for the train to reach the crossing is equal to the programmed threshold time. The earliest level crossing predictors used analog computers to perform this calculation, but modern equipment uses digital microprocessors.

=== Implementation ===
A predictor includes a short "island" track which just covers the width of the level crossing.

A predictor circuit in the middle of nowhere is usually terminated with a dead short across the rails at the outer ends. This assumes that there are no ordinary track circuits for block signalling purposes.

Two predictor circuits may overlap, with tuned circuits used for one predictor to jump over the other. The tuned loops would be a dead short for one predictor, and an open circuit for the other.

== See also ==
- Level crossing
- Boom barrier
- Crossbuck
- E-signal
- Manufacturers
- Wigwag
