= Griswold Signal Company =

Cross road signal company in America

- Formerly: Griswold Safety Signal Company
- Industry: Engineering
- Founded: 1923
- Founder: Franklin W. Griswold
- Defunct: 1964; 62 years ago
- Fate: Merged with Railroad Accessories Corporation (RACO) in 1964
- Headquarters: Minneapolis, U.S.
- Area served: U.S., Canada, Australia, New Zealand
- Products: Railway Signalling, Traffic Signalling

The Griswold Signal Company was an American company focused on railway signalling, based in Minneapolis, Minnesota. Founded by Minnesota native Franklin Wolcott Griswold, the company manufactured traffic signals and railroad level crossing signals.

== History ==
=== Beginning ===
Griswold got his start in 1923 with the invention of the "American Bobby," a traffic sign designed for placement in the middle of an intersection that would collapse if struck by a vehicle. Signs were nicknamed after London traffic control officers with its red and green lights visible in all directions. Many bobby signals were sold to municipalities throughout North America; this led to the development of the rotating banner signal.

=== Development ===
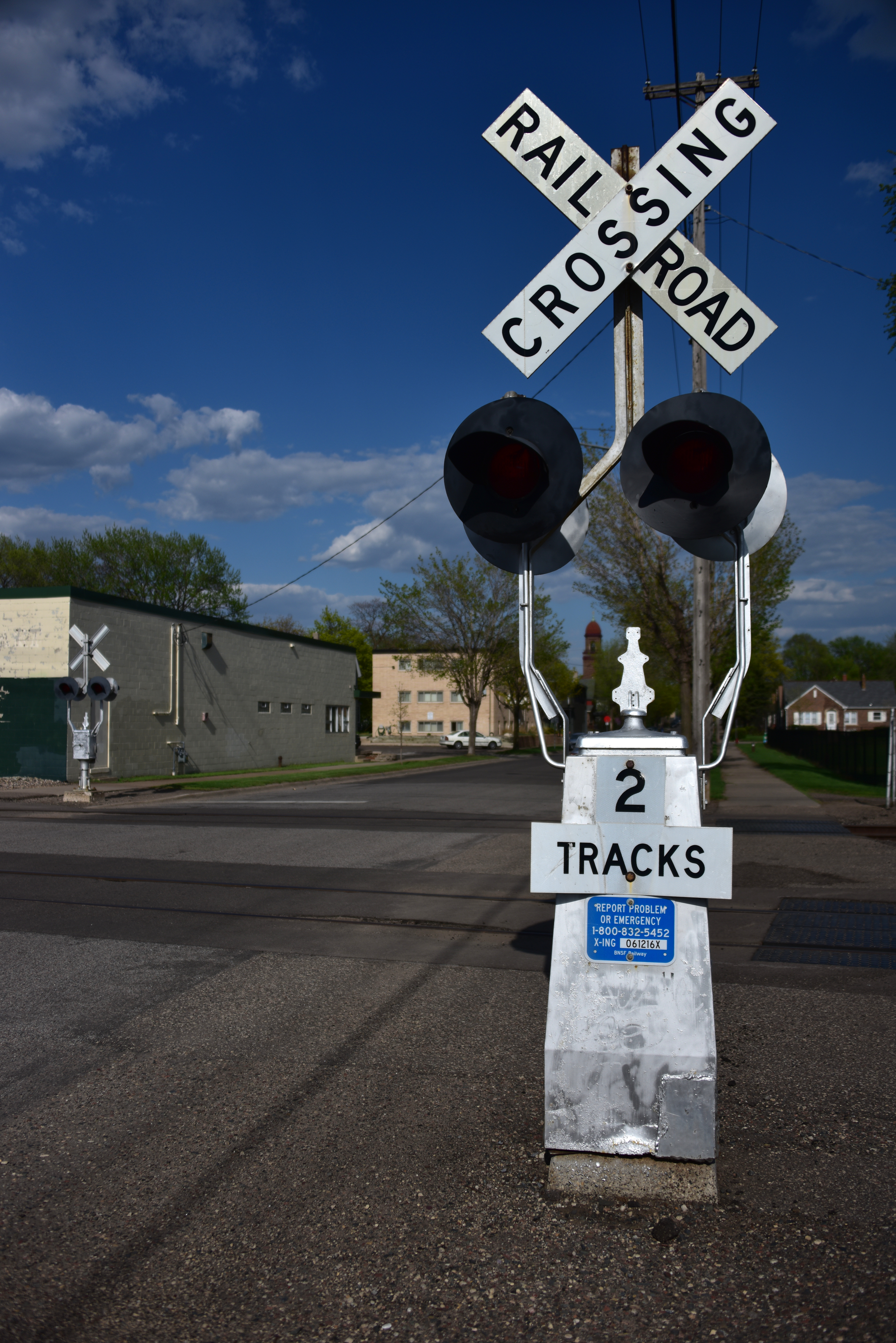
Griswold signals on 22nd Avenue NE, Minneapolis, pictured in 2018

In 1927, Griswold introduced the rotating banner signal. This was a unique combination of highway flasher and rotating stop sign (similar to a school bus stop sign). An approaching train would trigger not just the requisite red flashing lights and bells, but a mechanism that rotated a yellow stop sign ninety degrees to face traffic as well. (The signs eventually changed to red). This type of signal was relatively common throughout the Midwestern United States, where state regulators required use of the design. Some were also installed in the Western United States, especially along the Great Northern, Milwaukee Road, and Southern Pacific.

The firm purchased Los Angeles–based Magnetic Signal Company in the late 1940s and moved production to Minneapolis. Magnetic Signal is the company credited with the invention of the wigwag grade crossing signal once common throughout Southern California.

"Railroad Accessories Corporation" (RACO) merged with Griswold Signal Company in 1964. Manufacturing of crossing signals continued in Minneapolis. In 1971, RACO and Marquardt Industrial Products merged to form Safetran. Management, sales, and manufacture of crossing signals continued in Minneapolis until 2000, when the division moved to Kentucky.

== Surviving signals ==
As of November 2016, there are only half a dozen known Griswold signals still in service along active rail, all in Minnesota, none with rotating stop sign signals. The last pair with an operating banner protected 22nd Ave NE in Minneapolis, Minnesota. The Griswolds in Tacoma, Washington, and San Jose, California, were both removed circa 2010.
