= Wigwag (railroad) =

Railroad grade crossing signal

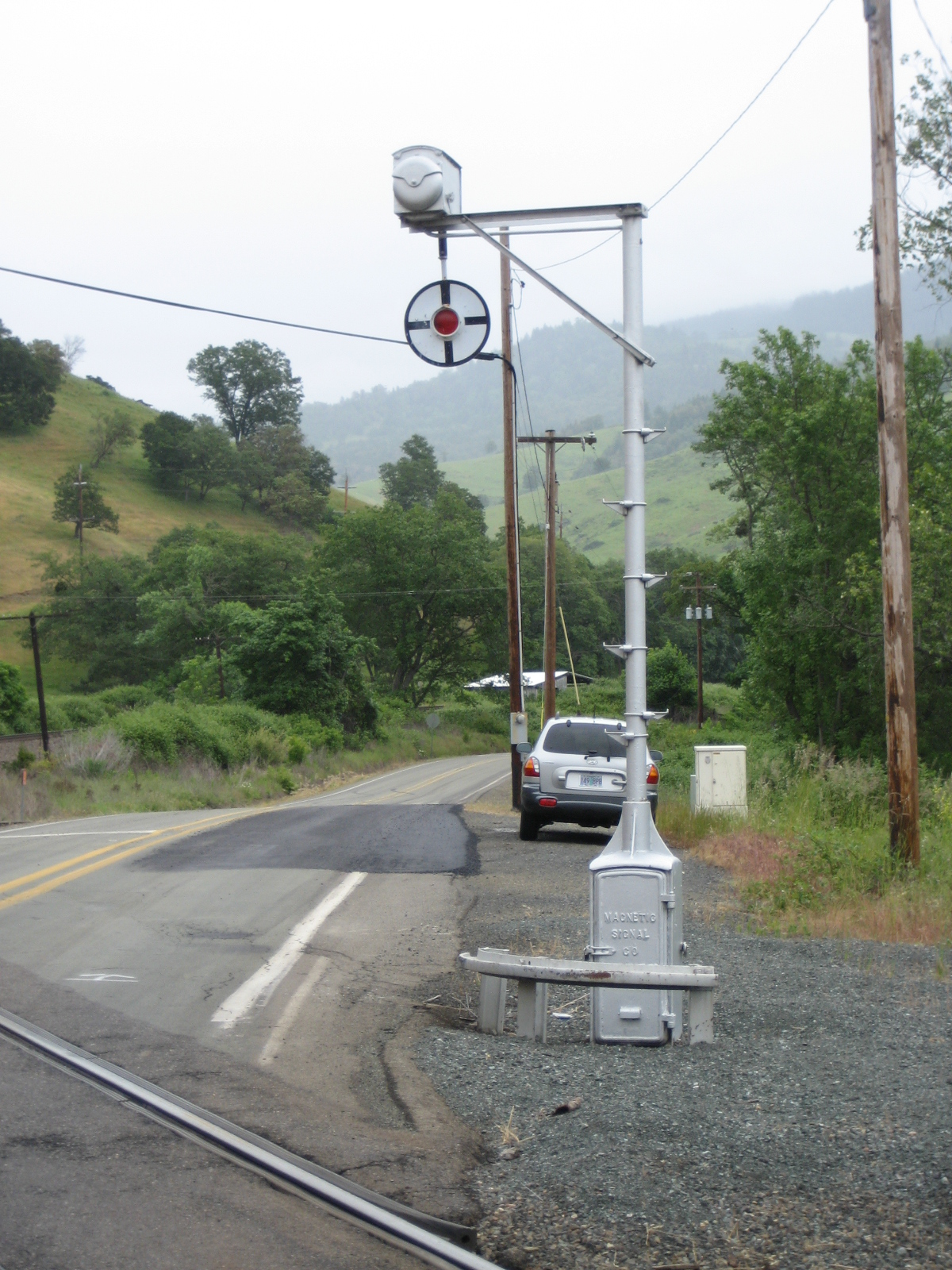
A Magnetic flagman wigwag signal in use in southern Oregon, June 2007

Wigwag is a nickname for a type of railroad grade crossing signal once common in North America, referring to its pendulum-like motion that signaled a train's approach. The device is generally credited to Albert Hunt, a mechanical engineer at Southern California's Pacific Electric (PERy) interurban streetcar railroad, who invented it in 1909 for safer railroad grade crossings. The term should not be confused with its usage in Britain, where "wigwag" generally refers to alternate flashing lights, such as those found at modern level crossings.

== Rationale ==
Soon after the advent of the automobile, travel speeds were increasing and the popularity of enclosed cars made the concept of "stop, look, and listen" at railroad crossings difficult. Fatalities at crossings were increasing. Though the idea of automatic grade crossing protection was not new, no one had invented a fail-safe, universally recognized system. In those days, many crossings were protected by a watchman who warned of an oncoming train by swinging a red lantern in a side-to-side arc, used universally in the United States to signify "stop". This motion is still used today by railroad workers to indicate stop per the General Code of Operating Rules (GCOR) Rule 5.3.1. It was presumed that a mechanical device that mimicked that movement would get the attention of approaching motorists and give an unmistakable warning.

== Design ==
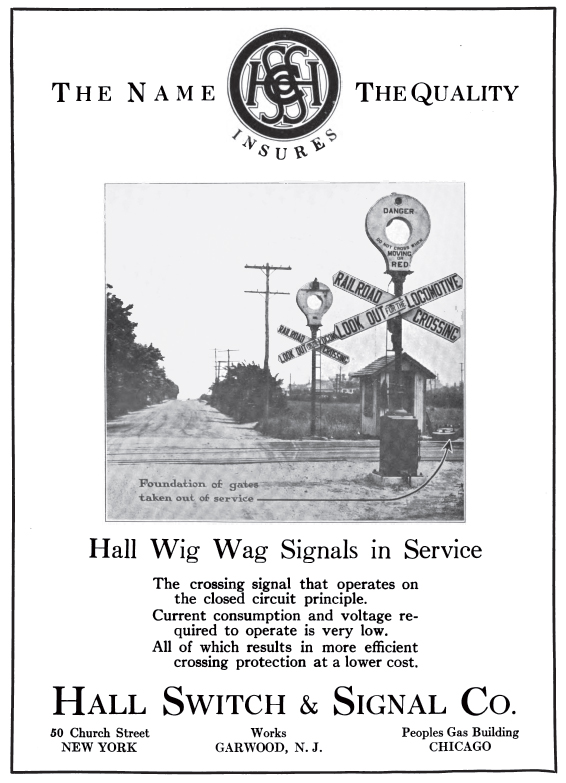
Advertisement for the Hall Signal Company, 1916

The earliest wigwags used by Pacific Electric Railway, built in the railroad's shops, were gear-driven, but proved difficult to maintain. The final design, first installed in 1914 at a busy crossing near Long Beach, California, utilized alternating electromagnets pulling on an iron armature. A red steel target disc, slightly less than two feet (0.61 m) in diameter was attached, which served as a pendulum. There was a red light in the center of the target, and with each swing of the target a mechanical gong sounded.

The new model, combining sight, motion and sound, was dubbed the magnetic flagman, and was manufactured by the Magnetic Signal Company of Los Angeles, California, though it is unclear exactly when production began. After the distinctive signals were installed, train and car collisions decreased at PE grade crossings. The signs became so common throughout the area that they were near-icons of Southern California motoring. Their popularity led to Magnetic Signal wigwags appearing at railroad crossings across the United States—including on Alaska's Copper River and Northwestern Railway and on several Hawaiian railroads—and across Canada, Mexico, Panama, several countries in Europe, briefly in Japan, and as far away as Australia and New Zealand.

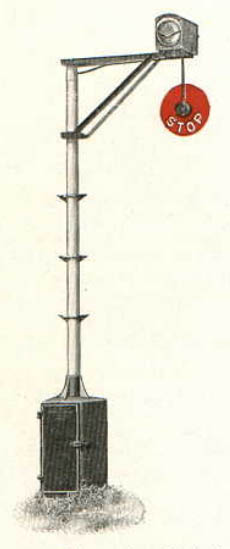
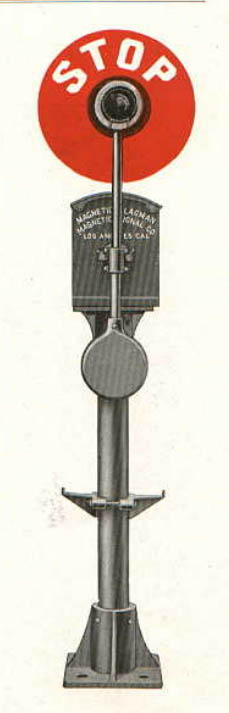
Two types of wigwag by Magnetic Signal Co.: lower quadrant (left) and upper quadrant (right), from a company catalog of 1922

Three mechanically-identical versions were produced. The upper-quadrant model was mounted directly atop a steel pole and waved the target above the motor box. It was intended for use where space was limited. Since the target could not serve as the pendulum, a cast iron counterweight opposite the target was used. Accurate computer-generated animation of that type of signal can be seen in the 2006 movie, Cars. The lower-quadrant version waved the target below the motor box and was intended to be cantilevered from a pole, over road traffic. Some railroads, especially in the north-western US, mounted their lower quadrant versions directly on top of a tall steel pole similar to the upper quadrant signal. They were placed on one side of the road, or on an island in the center of the road, and often had crossbucks fastened on top of the motor box. A lower quadrant signal of that kind is seen in the 2004 film Lemony Snicket's A Series of Unfortunate Events.

Though Magnetic Signal manufactured a steel pole and cast-iron base for the purpose (which served as a cabinet for backup batteries and relays), PE often mounted the cantilevers on the wooden poles that also supported the overhead catenary providing power for streetcars. That rendered batteries unnecessary, since any failure of PE's generators resulted in a shutdown of the railway. It also permitted the relays to be housed in a separate, inexpensive cabinet, reducing the cost of the installation.

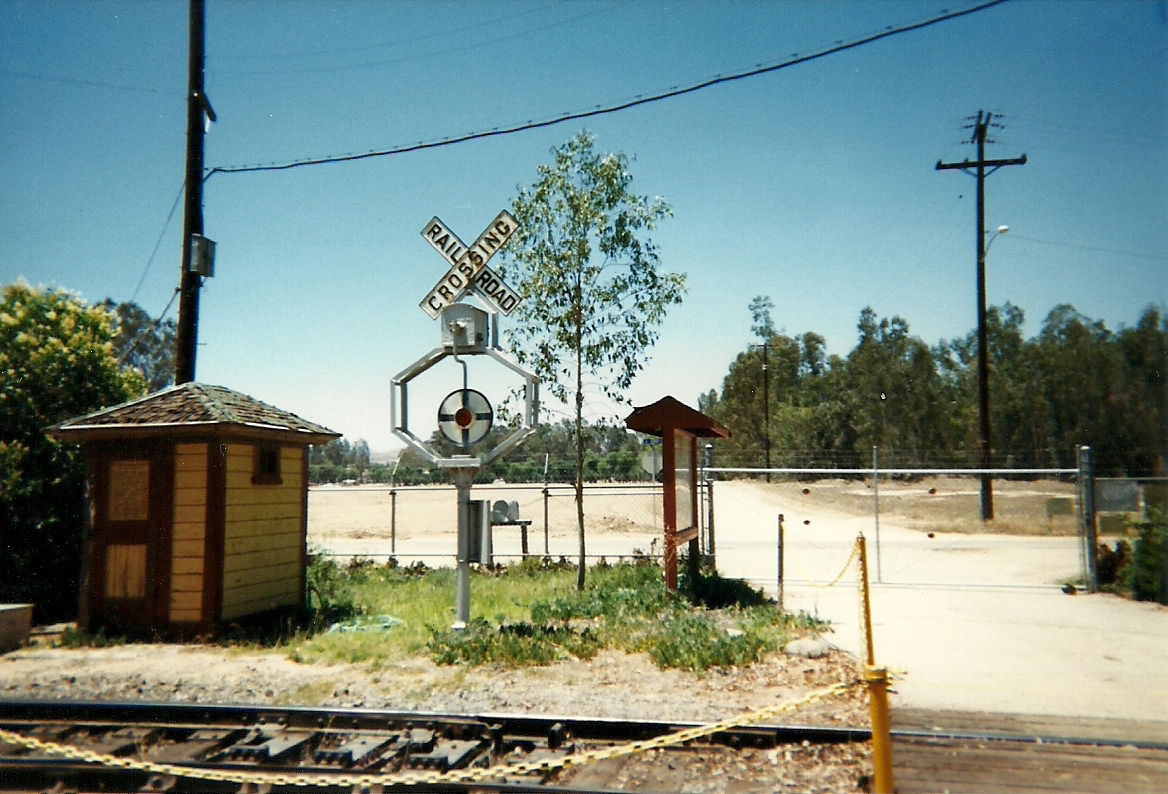
"Peach basket" variation primarily found on the Union Pacific, pictured in August 1999. This particular signal is operational and guards the main crossing of the Orange Empire Railway Museum

The third and least common version was a pole-mounted lower-quadrant signal, with the motor box fixed to the top of an octagonal steel frame that surrounded the target, presumably to protect both banner and motor box from being damaged by road vehicles. Dubbed the "peach basket" because of the protective framework, the apparatus was crowned by another visual warning, the traditional X-shaped "RAILROAD CROSSING" sign, or crossbucks. The majority of peach baskets were used by the Union Pacific Railroad. One version of the signal had the lower stripe on the banner replaced with the word stop that was lighted. When the signal was at rest, the words were hidden behind a screen that was painted to look like the missing stripe. They were either mounted on an island in the center of the road or on the side of the road.

The Magnetic Flagman wigwag waves its target using large, black electromagnets pulling against an iron armature. Sliding contacts switch the current from one magnet to the other. Each Magnetic Flagman includes a builder's plate (bottom center) detailing patent dates and power requirements.

There were a few other models that were either manufactured by Magnetic Signal or customized by the different railroads. Some examples included two signals on the same pole for different traffic approaches, a circular upper quadrant signal in which the target swung in a circular frame, and three-position signals where the target was hidden behind a sign when the signal was inactive. The Norfolk and Western Railway decided to make a change in which the motion-limiting bumpers were placed on the front of the signal instead of inside at the rear, so that the torque on the armature was reduced. They also had unique lights on their banners.

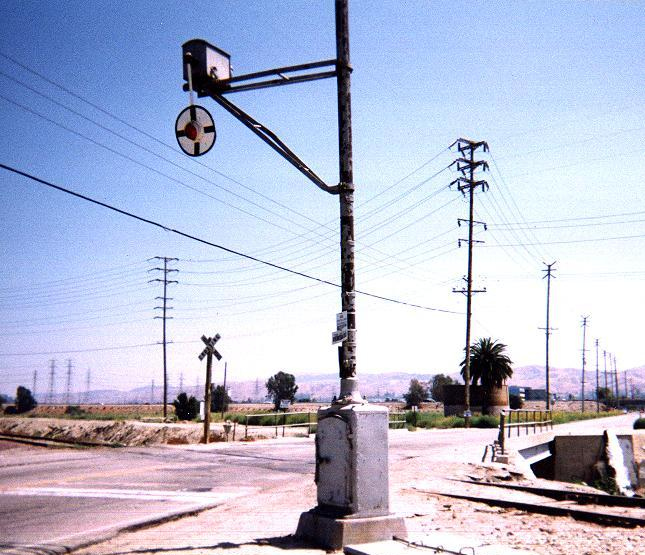
Lower-quadrant magnetic flagman wigwag signal on Mountain Avenue in Redlands, California, photographed in 2004. For economy, railroads occasionally installed signals on existing utility poles. This signal was retired after more than six decades of service atop its Union Switch & Signal base, and replaced by highway gates and flashers as part of construction for the Arrow commuter rail service.

Any version could be ordered to operate using the railroad signal standard of 8 volts DC (VDC) current, or the 600 VDC used to power streetcars and electric locomotives, with little more than a change in the electromagnets. Most, if not all, of the 600 VDC units were used by PE. With the conversion to diesel power after PE sold its passenger operations in 1953, those 600 VDC wigwags were gradually converted to 8 VDC units. There were also some 110 volt AC models of Magnetic Flagman used on several railroads, including Norfolk and Western, Winston-Salem Southbound, and the Milwaukee Road. Since AC power did not generate good torque, a coil cutoff device was installed that utilized all four magnets until full motion of the banner was obtained, then two of the magnets went off line and movement was maintained by the remaining two magnets.

Various options were available. One was a round, counterbalancing "sail" for use in windy areas and which was sometimes painted in the same scheme as the main target. A warning light with adjustable housing was offered, as was an "OUT OF ORDER" warning sign that dropped into view if power to the signal was interrupted. There was a rare adjustable turret-style mount for properly aiming the signal if space did not allow the cantilever to fully extend over the roadway. The last known example of the turret-mounted wigwag was removed from service in Gardena, California in 2000, while the versions with the warning signs were mostly shipped to Australia. One surviving example is on display at the Newport Railway Museum in Melbourne, Victoria, and one has been restored and now operates on the Puffing Billy Railway. An example or two of each signal still survive with collectors.

A ruling by the United States Interstate Commerce Commission mandated a change in the target in the early 1930s. It required a change in the paint scheme from solid red to a black cross and border on a white background, but there was no other change until a ruling that required the alternating red lights in use today. That, along with other rules about grade crossing signaling that the wigwags were unable to meet due to their power requirements, rendered them obsolete for new installations after 1949, but grandfathering laws allowed them to remain until the crossings they protected were upgraded. The Magnetic Signal Company was sold to the Griswold Signal Company of Minneapolis shortly after World War II. Production of new signals continued until 1949, and replacement parts until 1960.

The symbol of a black cross on a white background was adopted in the US as the traffic sign warning drivers about an unprotected grade crossing and was incorporated into the corporate logo of the Santa Fe Railroad. It remains in use today, although with a yellow background and the cross rotated 45 degrees into an "X". Some railroads, among them the Louisville and Nashville Railroad, used a concentric black circle on a white background, resembling a bullseye, but that scheme was rare, partly because the L&N used few wigwags.

== In modern United States ==
Few wigwag signals currently remain in place, and the number dwindles as crossings are upgraded and spare parts become scarce.

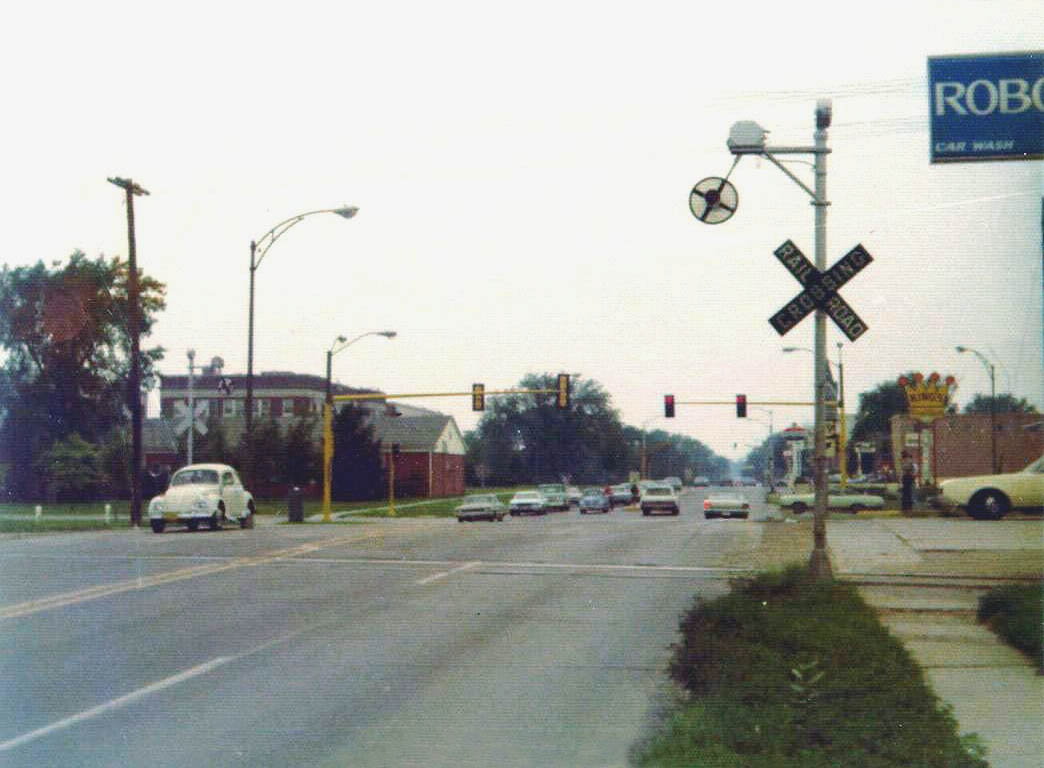
Two WRRS Autoflag #5s on the Ames-Des Moines branch of the Chicago & North Western in downtown Ames, Iowa, September 1971. Signals were replaced by more modern devices in 1973.

Although many wig wags are still used by heritage railroads and railroad museums, there are only 14 railroad crossings with at least one wigwag remaining in use for regular railroads in the United States as of 2022. All 14 are in California. There is also a non-working example located in Pullman, Washington. This is stark contrast from Federal Railroad Administration data from 2004, showing there were 1,098 railroad crossings in the United States having one or more wigwags as their warning device. Of those 1,098 crossings having wigwags, 398 were in California, 117 in Wisconsin, 97 in Illinois, 66 in Texas and 45 in Kansas. The 2004 data showed a total of 44 states have at least one railroad crossing having a wigwag as its warning device. A previous FRA publication from 1983 showed 2,618 crossings equipped with wigwags.

The last wigwag on a main rail line, a Magnetic Flagman upper-quadrant at a rural crossing in Delhi, Colorado on the BNSF Railway, was removed in March 2021 and now resides at the Colorado Railroad Museum. Until destroyed by a truck in April 2004, a lower-quadrant Magnetic Flagman wigwag protected a private crossing of a BNSF line hidden from public view by a sound barrier in Pittsburg, California. The wigwag, the last "Model 10" in active use, was replaced by standard highway flashers. The Model 10 was distinguished by its short, low-hanging cantilever and use of crossbucks mounted higher than the cantilever. They were almost exclusively used by the Santa Fe, although there were also a few of this model on the Southern Pacific. In 2011–12, working replica wigwags were installed at Disney California Adventure Park in Anaheim, California along the Red Car Trolley as well as show wigwags that were placed in Radiator Springs Racers.

Anaheim had a working signal along the Union Pacific Costa Mesa branch at Lemon and Santa Ana Streets before being removed on February 25, 2019. This same signal may have been featured in the 1922 Magnetic Flagman catalog.

Collector and notable film director, Chris M. Allport owns and operates a restored, lower-quadrant Magnetic Flagman (made in Minneapolis) wigwag at his studio in Los Angeles, California.

A single lower-quadrant wigwag in the industrial city of Vernon, California, once protected a crossing on 49th Street with eight separate tracks on the BNSF Harbor Subdivision. A link between downtown Los Angeles and the ports of Los Angeles and Long Beach, this line currently sees less traffic since the completion of the more direct Alameda Corridor between downtown and the harbor. This project eliminated many at-grade crossings along Alameda Street and a number of Southern Pacific wigwags remaining from the PE era. Those remaining protect crossings of lightly used spur lines primarily in California and Wisconsin, the latter state featuring a different signal produced by Bryant-Zinc purchased by the Railroad Supply Company, which later became the Western Railroad Supply Company (WRRS). The signal was removed sometime in late April 2020. Its removal and that of the Anaheim signal the previous year marked the end of Southern California wigwags still in revenue service.

Wigwags manufactured by WRRS and its predecessors were once numerous in the Midwest, with almost every town using them to protect their main crossings. The most common model was called the Autoflag #5. They functioned in much the same way as the Magnetic Flagmen. They utilized alternating electromagnets to swing a shaft with an attached illuminated banner. Bells were not integral to the devices as with the Magnetic Flagmen. They employed standard bells that were used on other types of signals, and mounted either to the mast or to a bracket on the top of the center harp style, as in the Devil's Lake, WI photo.

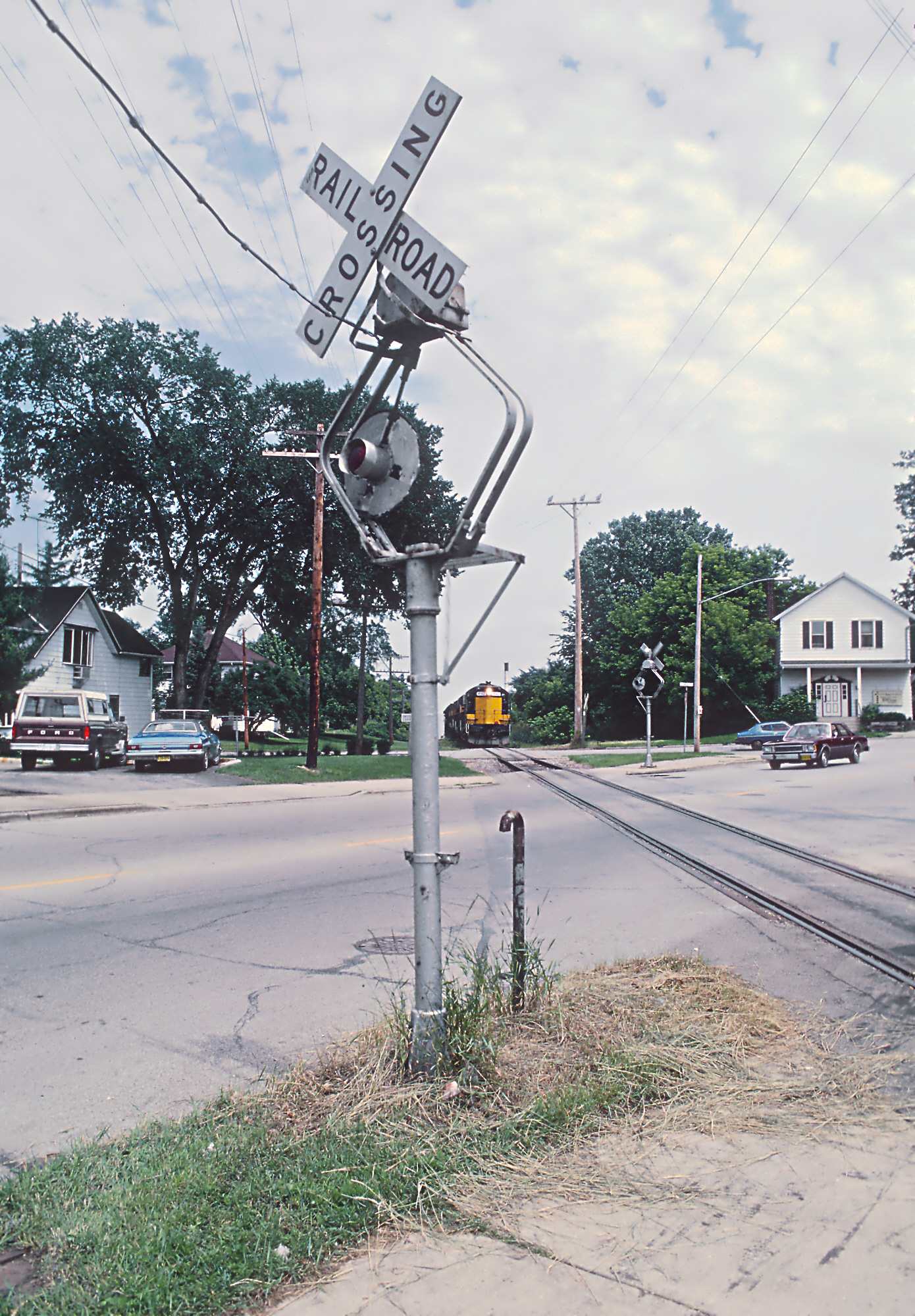
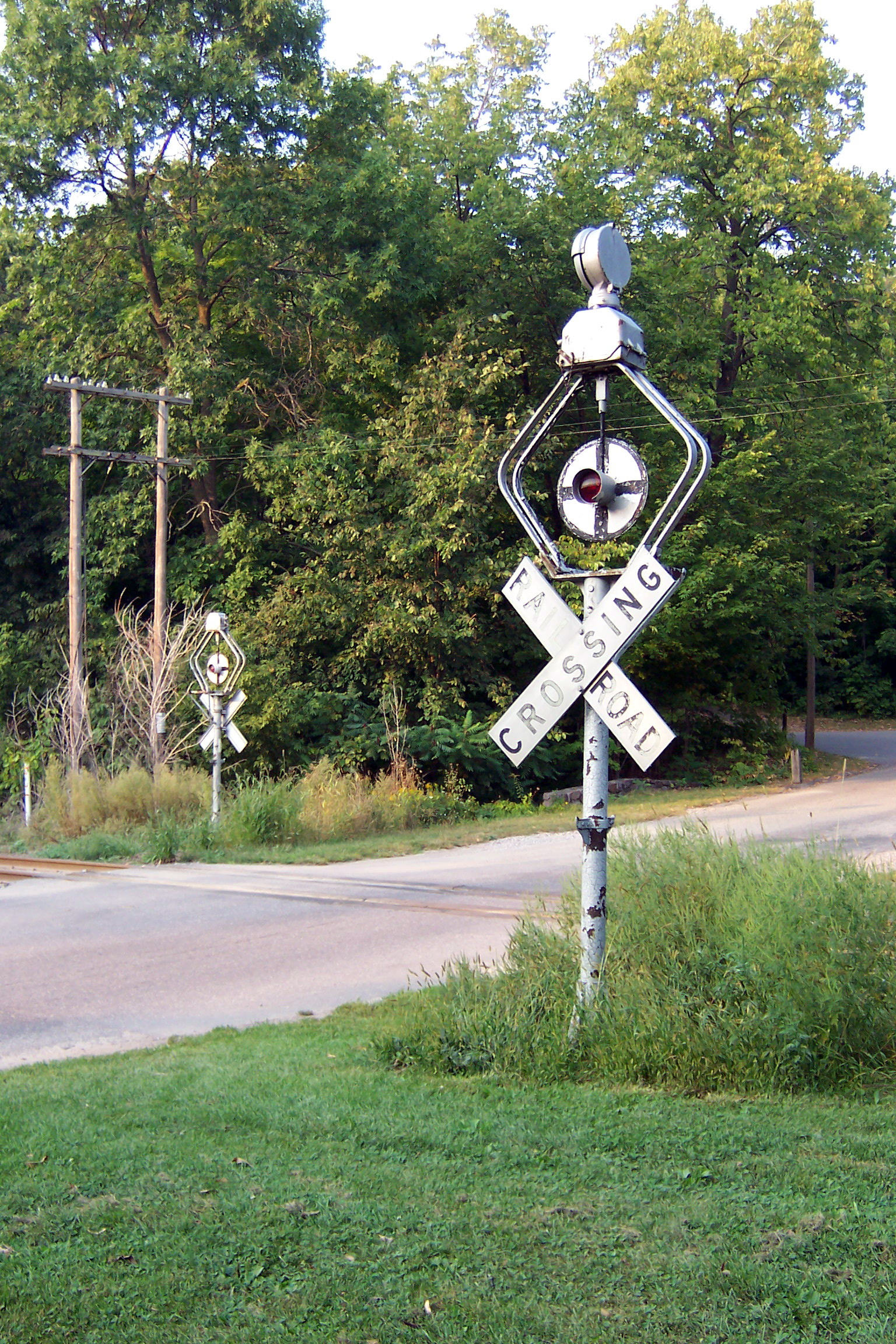
Two examples of WRRS Autoflag #5 "center harp" wigwag signals, (left): on a CN&W crossing in Wisconsin, July 1982. (right): on Devil's Lake, Wisconsin, September 2005. These signals were retired in 2012.

Autoflag #5s were widely used on the Chicago & North Western (C&NW), Chicago, Burlington & Quincy (CB&Q), Illinois Central, Soo Line and the Milwaukee Road Railroads. A few were also used on the Louisville & Nashville and the Gulf, Mobile & Ohio (GM&O) as well as other roads in the US and Canada. Most of these wigwags were removed in the 1970-1980s as crossings were updated. They were made in both a lower quadrant style and a center harp style similar to the Magnetic Flagman's peachbasket style. Early on, there were Autoflag #5s that would hold the banner behind a shield much like the Magnetic Flagman disappearing banner-style. These were replaced as time went on with the standard two-position banner that hung vertically when not energized. Several railroad, such as the GM&O and CB&Q, had a second light below the main light on the banner. This served as a second reserve light in case of failure of both bulbs in the main light and as a signal maintainers' warning of a burned-out bulb without having to climb up and open the main light to check each bulb. If the secondary light was illuminated, there was an issue with burned out bulbs in the main light.

Wigwags were also manufactured by Union Switch and Signal (US&S). They were primarily used in the northeastern US, with a few in Florida, although the Frisco had some in the Great Plains. An example was also pictured in a review of Hawaiian sugar cane railroads from the 1940s. They were manufactured in both a disappearing banner style in the East and standard two-position in the Great Plains. While there are a few examples in museums, the sole surviving US&S wigwag in service in the US is a two-position style in Joplin, MO on an ex-Frisco industrial spur. It was not destroyed in the May, 2011 Joplin tornado, being a few blocks outside the damage path. These were a bit different in design from the Autoflag #5 and the Magnetic Flagman. The swing of the banner was produced through a drive shaft. Some of them, particularly on the Boston & Maine Railroad, had chase lights mounted above the banner that simulated the movement of the banner. There are a number of US&S wigwags that have been preserved and restored by museums.

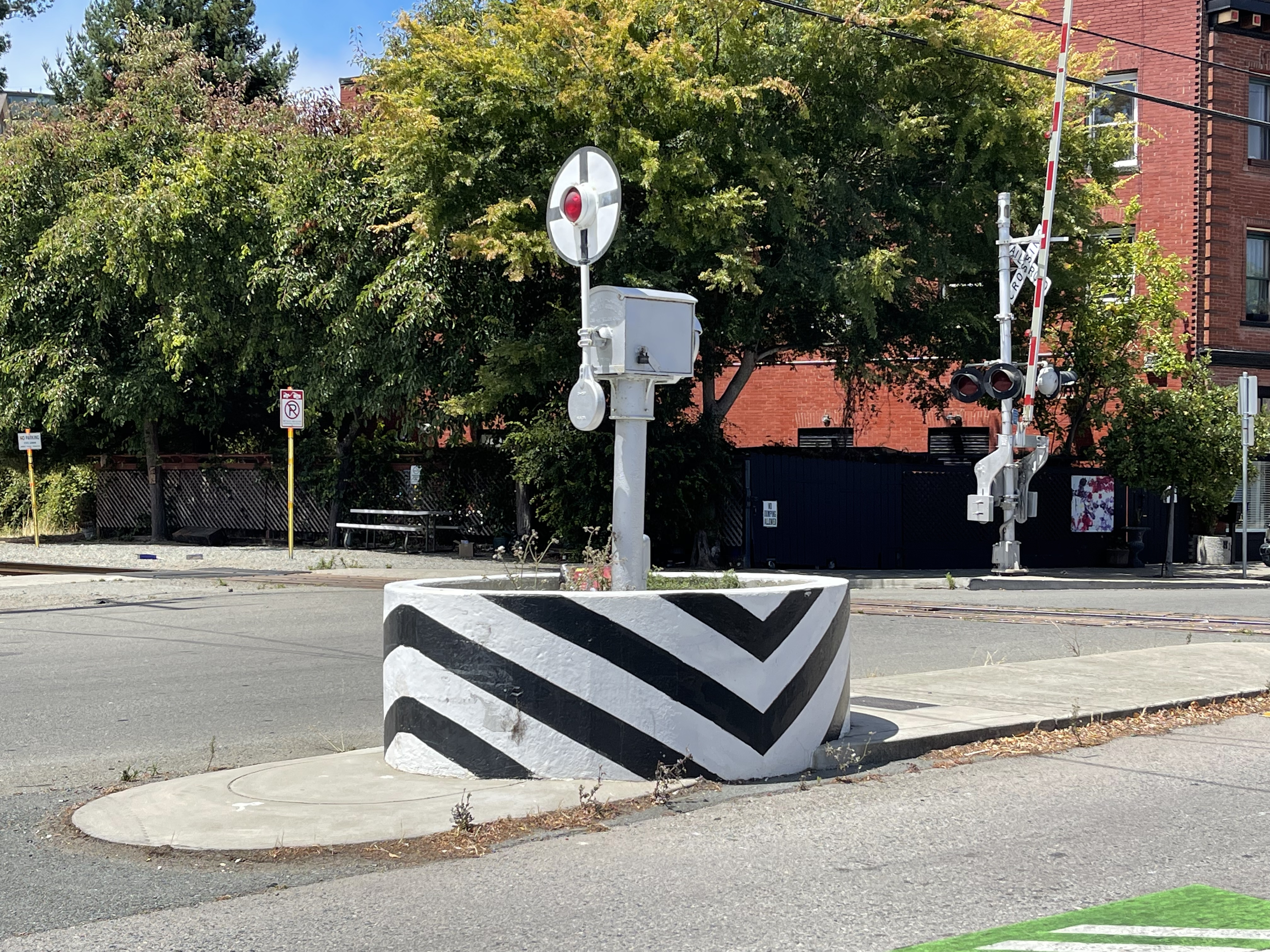
The preserved wigwag along with the modern signal devices at the West Richmond Avenue level crossing in Point Richmond, California, 2022

The wigwags at the crossing that mark the location of the western terminus of the BNSF Railway (successor to the Santa Fe) on West Richmond Avenue in Point Richmond, CA became pawns in a fight over local control in 2001 when BNSF said it was going to remove them once they installed more modern devices, after the state's transportation authority pressured it to upgrade the crossing. Nevertheless, in July 2019 the two upper wig wags were put operative again after the Richmond community raised funds ($2,000) to restore the devices, which had been out of use for 18 years. The two upper-quadrant wigwags are the last of their kind paired together in active use. Both wigwags remain as non-operative decorations at the crossing, coexisting with the modern gates, red lights and bells. In the interest of safety, information signs were posted at the wigwags stating that the wigwags are non-operational. The ability to be activated by trains was retained, but only for special events.

On the episode of American Restoration aired on April 16, 2013, a pair of WRRS Autoflag #5 wigwag signals were restored for the Nevada Northern Railway Museum in Ely, Nevada.

== Wigwags outside of the United States ==
While Wigwags are usually associated with being used exclusively in the United States, there are some wigwag crossings used elsewhere. The most infamous of these are the Tilbury wigwags in Ontario, Canada, but some had also been used in other countries such as Australia and Norway.

=== The Americas ===
In Canada, US&S and WRRS wigwags were used by the Canadian Pacific Railway on its Canadian lines. Among these were two wig-wags located on the Canadian National Railway CASO subdivision near Tilbury, Ontario. Four Wigwags were also used in a crossing nearby Niagara Falls and two were installed in Tower Road near Yarmouth, St. Thomas. All were WRRS Autoflag #5s with disappearing banners, as disappearing banners were the only style of wigwag approved for use in Canada.

There are at least 5 wigwags left in Chile; one in Padre Hurtado, one outside San Felipe, and three in Llaillay. It is unknown if they are in use.

Both Panama (In the Canal Zone), and Mexico also used wigwags.

=== Europe ===
In the Netherlands there were two known wigwags; one at a portal on the Damlaan in Leidschendam (the famous blue tramway line)(1924-1961), and one installed in 1924 on a cantilever over Bentveldweg in Zandvoort. Both were Magnetic Signal Company lower quadrant models.

In France, The Compagnie Générale de Signalisation (General Signalisation Company) imported five Wigwags from Westinghouse Brake & Signal Company in the USA from 1925 to 1928 to be used in Southern Brittany, Meaux, Bourbon-l'Archambault, and La Roizonne. A sixth wigwag was also added on a crossing in the main-line between Ermont and Valmondois in 1930. Eventually in 1935 to 1938, all wigwags in France were removed.

In Norway, as the NSB began phasing out manually operated crossing gates, a lower quadrant wigwag made by the Magnetic Signal Company was imported in 1928, and installed on a crossing in Smørbekk, along the Østford Line. On February 4th, 1956, it was acquired by the Norwegian Railway Museum where it still remains as of 2026.

There were 4 known wigwags in Switzerland, two on the Swiss Southeastern Railroad and two on Swiss Federal Railways (SBB) tracks. The one in Samstagern protected a small road that led to a monastery. It is unknown when these wigwags were installed or retired, but the one in Samstagern was replaced by a simple crossbuck, flashing lights, and a bell sometime after 1941.

There have also been a few Wigwags installed in Italy. One wigwag was known to be installed in Settimo Torinese near Turin on the main line to Milan. Other Wigwag installations have been used before and shortly after World War 2 in Northern Italy, with most of them being in the Northeastern part of Piedmont and Lombardy. However, the exact locations these Wigwags were installed in are unknown.

A wigwag was installed on the Barcelona-Paseo de Gracia train line in Spain. The wigwag appears to be installed with a crossing barrier. Not much is known about whether it’s the only Wigwag or one of multiple Wigwags in Spain, let alone when it was installed and retired, aside from the fact that it was in Spain at least in 1940 during the Franco dictatorship.

=== Oceania ===
In Australia, several wigwags were used in the country, especially Victoria state. A wigwag is left preserved along the abandoned Victor Harbor railway line in Mount Barker, South Australia, and another is preserved on the puffing billy railway.

In New Zealand, Wigwag Signals were used since the mid-1920s, with a specific example being installed at Terrace End in Palmerston North in 1927, and continued being used in New Zealand throughout the 1930s and '40s.

=== Asia ===
In Japan, as train collisions began to increase alongside growing car ownership, The Minister’s Secretariat Research Institute had a US&S model DW Auto-Flagman installed at a crossing on Tokyo station grounds in July of 1923. Tested against it was a prototype designed by the Bureau of Railway Research. both signals were destroyed soon after in the Great Kanto Earthquake. Testing resumed four months later along the Yamanote line near Yoyogi station, using another model DW which was activated automatically by rail contacts. The following year, they would also be installed between Ueno and Akihabara to compare to the Ministry’s newly developed flashing light type. Ultimately, due to requiring constant maintenance and having poor visibility, the latter was adopted instead.

== Preservation ==
Several wig-wag signals have been preserved at heritage railroads and museums, including, but not necessarily limited to the following:

- Arizona Railway Museum
- California State Railroad Museum
- Colfax Railroad Museum
- Colorado Railroad Museum
- Conway Scenic Railroad
- East Troy Electric Railroad Museum
- Edaville Railroad
- Elgin County Railway Museum
- Frisco Heritage Museum
- Heart of Dixie Railroad Museum
- Hoosier Valley Railroad Museum
- Illinois Railway Museum
- Mid-Continent Railway Museum
- Monticello Railway Museum
- Nevada Northern Railway Museum
- North Carolina Transportation Museum
- Orange Empire Railway Museum
- Oregon Electric Railway Museum
- National Railway Museum, Port Adelaide
- Rosenberg Railroad Museum
- San Luis Obispo Railroad Museum
- Tennessee Valley Railroad Museum
- Virginia Museum of Transportation
- Western Pacific Railroad Museum
- Whippany Railway Museum
- Norwegian Railway Museum
- Old Prairie Town
- Texas Transport Museum

== See also ==
- Grade crossing signals
- Crossbuck
