= Magnetic Signal Company =

American railway signalling company

- Company type: Private
- Industry: Electronics
- Founded: c. 1910
- Defunct: c. 1960
- Fate: Acquired by the Griswold Signal after the WWII. Production continued until 1949
- Headquarters: Los Angeles, California, U.S.
- Area served: United States
- Products: Railway signalling

The Magnetic Signal Company (abbreviated as MSC) was an American company based in Los Angeles, California, focused on railway signalling. The company was the manufacturer of the ubiquitous "Magnetic Flagman" wigwag railroad crossing (or level crossing) signal, seen all over California and the western states.

== History ==
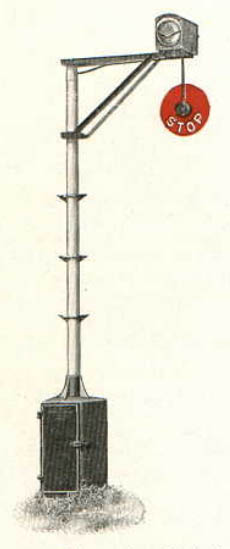
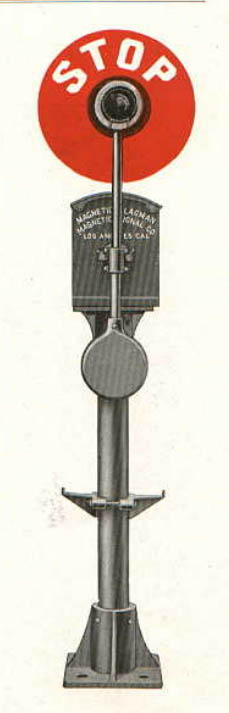
Two types of wigwag by Magnetic Signal Co.: lower quadrant'' (left) and upper quadrant (right), from a company catalog of 1922

The company was established sometime after 1910, and received its first patent, on May 19, 1914. Its general offices and factory were located at 3355 East Slauson Avenue in Vernon, an industrial area just south of downtown Los Angeles. It was an ideal location for a company that would eventually supply over 7,000 wig-wag signals in the US and the world, because it had excellent rail access for not only shipping its products out, but also for bringing in the raw materials needed to manufacture its products. The Union Pacific's old Los Angeles and Salt Lake line to the harbor ran just east of the location, and the main lines of the Southern Pacific and Santa Fe ran by just north of there as well. That probably had a great deal to do with those three railroads being some of Magnetic Signal's biggest customers.

In its heyday, the Magnetic Signal Company not only manufactured wigwag signals, but also the alternating-flasher type railroad signals, reflectorized "Railroad Crossing" signs, button reflectors for highway signs, traffic island beacons, curb beacons, flasher relays, automobile and bicycle reflectors, and even a "Portafount" portable drinking fountain. The company had sales offices in New York, Chicago, St. Louis, Salt Lake City, Seattle and Washington, D.C.

Although it is known that the signal department of the Pacific Electric Railway developed the first wigwags in 1909, under the direction of Albert Hunt, it is not known when the Magnetic Signal Company became a separate entity. What is known is that it soon became a subsidiary of the American Brake Shoe and Foundry Company of Los Angeles, which also owned National Bearing Metals Corporation and the Canadian Ramapo Iron Works. It remained a subsidiary of American Brake Shoe until it was purchased by the Griswold Signal Company of Minneapolis, Minnesota, sometime in the late 1940s. At that time, the offices and factory on Slauson Avenue were closed down and relocated to Minneapolis.

The Magnetic Signal Company was sold to the Griswold Signal Company of Minneapolis shortly after WWII. Production of new signals continued until 1949, and replacement parts until 1960.

== Bibliography ==
- The Life and Times of the Pacific Electric: The World's Greatest Interurban, by Jim Walker, published by the Orange Empire Railway Museum of Perris, California (1983)
