= E-signal =

Swedish private road railway grade crossing signal

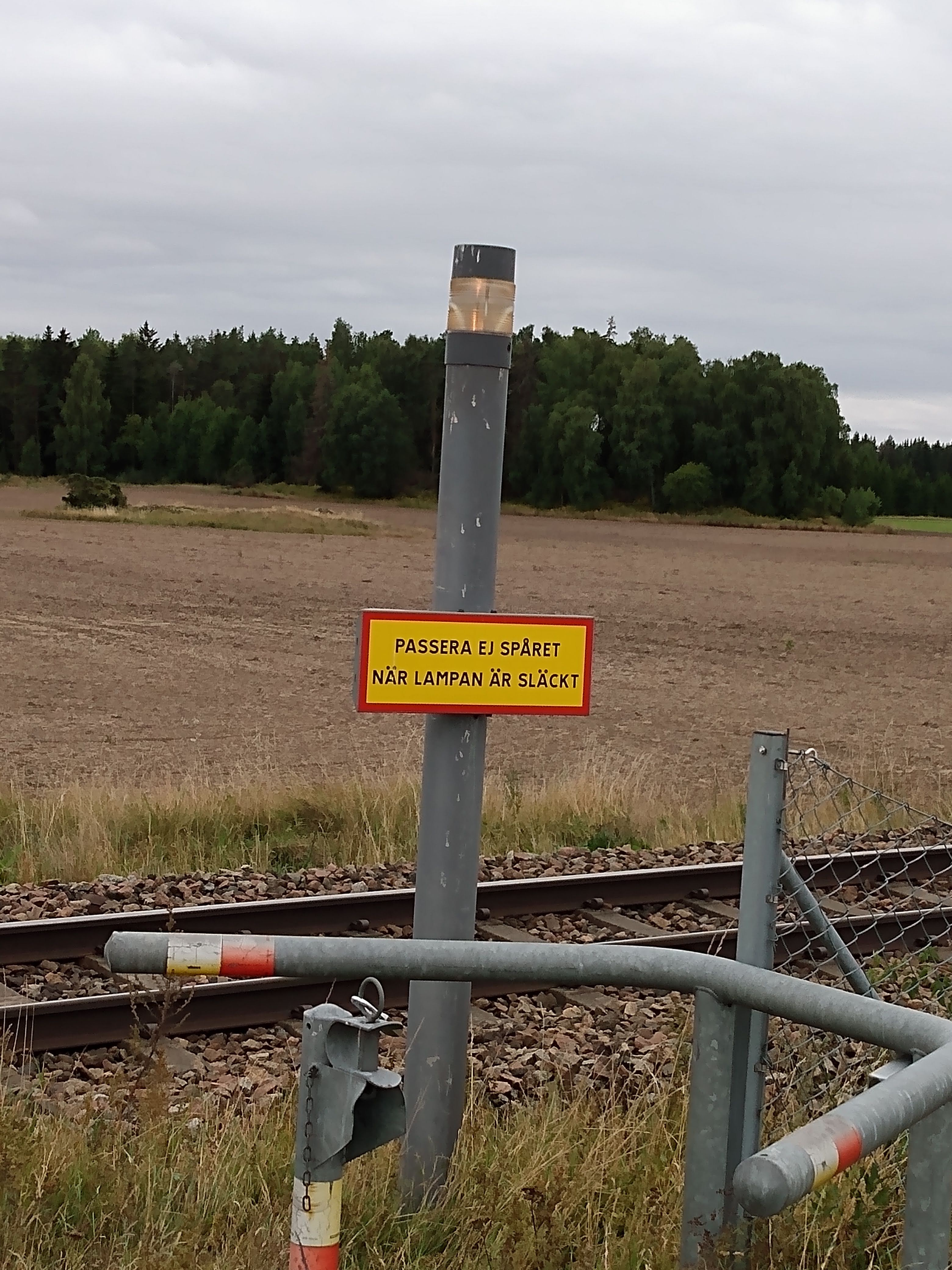
E-signal on Dalabanan, just west of Uppsala. The sign states: "Do not pass the track when light is extinguished."

The E-signal (Swedish: Ägovägssignal, lit. "owner's road signal") is a type of level crossing signals used in Sweden on very low-traffic roads crossing a railroad track, when the same landowner owns the property on both sides of the railway track and only a few residential buildings and no facility of public interest can be reached from the road. An e-signal operates in the opposite fashion of a conventional grade crossing signal: it is lit when no train is approaching the crossing, and when a train approaches, it extinguishes approximately 30-60 seconds before the train's arrival. This is intended to provide a 'fail safe' function, in the event the power has failed or the signal bulb has blown; e-signal mountings are always supplemented with an information plate indicating the function of the signal. It is supplied from the track circuit which supply a voltage to one rail in order to detect trains. When there is a train there can be no voltage difference between the rails. This means that no external uninterruptible power supply is needed and the installation cost is greatly reduced, allowing many more to be installed within limited budgets.

Due to its method of function, the e-signal is considered to be potentially confusing to drivers and is being phased out of service; however, in Sweden there are still approximately 170 E-signals in operation (value from 2010). Also gateless crossings are not allowed to be installed. Full gate installations are now needed when new crossings are built or existing crossings get signalling.

== United States ==
The Monon Railroad used a similar signal on its lines throughout the state of Indiana. The device used a green light, usually made from a standard traffic signal, which always remained lit except when a train was present. The green light would then go dark, telling motorists to stop. A sign below or to the side of the signal read, "STOP When Signal Is Out" or "DANGER when light is out cross at your own risk". This design was fail-safe, in that when the signal bulb was burned out, an approaching vehicle driver would assume a train was coming — until they eventually realized there was no train and just a burned-out signal.
