= Crate Day =

Unofficial holiday in New Zealand

- Observed by: New Zealanders
- Type: Secular
- Significance: Observing the start of summer
- Celebrations: Beer consumption, liquor store discounts
- Date: First Saturday in December
- 2025 date: December 6
- 2026 date: December 5
- 2027 date: December 4
- 2028 date: December 2
- Frequency: Annual
- First time: 2010
- Started by: The Rock

Crate Day is an unofficial celebration in New Zealand, held on the first Saturday of December every year. Participants set themselves the challenge of finishing a crate of twelve 745ml beer bottles between noon and midnight. The total alcohol content of a crate, 300 grams, is close to a lethal dose.

Crate Day was first promoted by radio station The Rock in 2010, and the event has since grown in popularity, leading to a number of disturbances, arrests, and injuries each year. Many alcohol-related businesses have promotions for the event, and numerous local councils enact liquor bans or restrictions over the weekend. The Rock no longer promotes the event.

== History ==
In 2010, mainstream rock radio station The Rock started The Rock National Crate Day, a yearly event promoted on air alongside the sale of Crate Day themed merchandise. Duncan Heyde, The Rock's then-afternoon slot host, has been credited as an early major proponent of the event. The station held a 12-hour broadcast starting from noon, with participants invited to listen in as they consumed a crate of twelve beer bottles in a social setting. The event was ostensibly promoted as a way to mark the start of summer with friends, hence it occurring on the first weekend of the season.

The Rock published a yearly list of 10 "commandments" for participants to follow, including supporting "thy crate of origin", referring to drinking beer from an individual's hometown or region, and "thou only beef that should attend National Crate Day is thy beef for thy BBQ". The event soon grew in popularity and became less connected with The Rock, with the weekend now seeing a rise of injuries and arrests each year. The Rock stopped officially promoting National Crate Day in 2019.

== Controversy ==
The event started receiving media criticism in the early 2010s for promoting binge drinking, with police and hospital staff citing it as a reason for an increase in hospital visits and arrests. A study released in 2023 found that on Crate Day weekends, compared to other weekends, twice as many drunk 20-34 year olds needed treatment at emergency departments in Waikato. Two thirds of the patients hospitalised for alcohol-related reasons were male.

In November 2015, two complaints were laid with SPCA New Zealand after a Taranaki man shared his Crate Day plans on Facebook, including the spit roasting of a miniature horse. He later added "If u wanna bring sum food all gd. Salad that will go with horse." The posts were later removed after the SPCA was contacted.

In 2016, 300 people attended an impromptu Crate Day event held on the Village Green in central Queenstown. The event, organised through social media, resulted in trash and vomit being left behind, with locals calling for a liquor ban over the Crate Day weekend.

In December 2022, a group of 70 four-wheel drive vehicles were observed at the Ashley River / Rakahuri in Canterbury on the river bed where endangered birds were nesting, during an event to mark Crate Day. The endangered species that nest along the river bed from September to February include banded dotterel and black-fronted tern. Despite signs warning of fines and imprisonment for disturbing endangered species, the drivers went ahead and entered the river bed. In December 2023, despite the presence of police, Department of Conservation staff, and Environment Canterbury representatives, a group of around 150 4WD vehicles entered the Ashley River again on Crate Day, causing disruption to the breeding colonies of endangered birds and crushing eggs. In 2024, the Waimakariri District Mayor held meetings with 4WD groups, environmental groups, community boards and councillors about access to the river during the bird breeding season. The original organiser of Crate Day, Ashley Sargeant, also called for 4WD drivers to stay away from the river. Few 4WD vehicles arrived at the river to celebrate Crate Day in 2024, and none entered the breeding colony areas.

== In popular culture ==
Crate Day was the inspiration for Truly Friday's single 'Crate Day'.

In 2022, New Zealand band DARTZ played four backyard Crate Day shows in Christchurch, Wellington, Auckland, and Hamilton in 12 hours. This followed the band playing 14 shows across Wellington for 2019's Crate Day.

== See also ==
- List of unofficial observances in New Zealand
- Alcohol in New Zealand
- Six o'clock swill
