= NZ Rail 150 =

Celebration of 150 years of rail transport in New Zealand

NZ Rail 150 was a celebration of 150 years of Rail transport in New Zealand, held in 2013 which was 150 years since the first public railway opened at Ferrymead in Christchurch.

The celebration was organised by KiwiRail in partnership with the Canterbury Railway Society, Ferrymead Heritage Park, and the Rail Heritage Trust of New Zealand.

== Events ==
The celebrations commenced on 19 October 2013 with the Christchurch Model Train Show and carried on the next day. KiwiRail commenced their part in the celebrations on 29 September 2013 with their Exhibition Express that made the following stops:

- The Strand railway station, Auckland - 29 September 2013

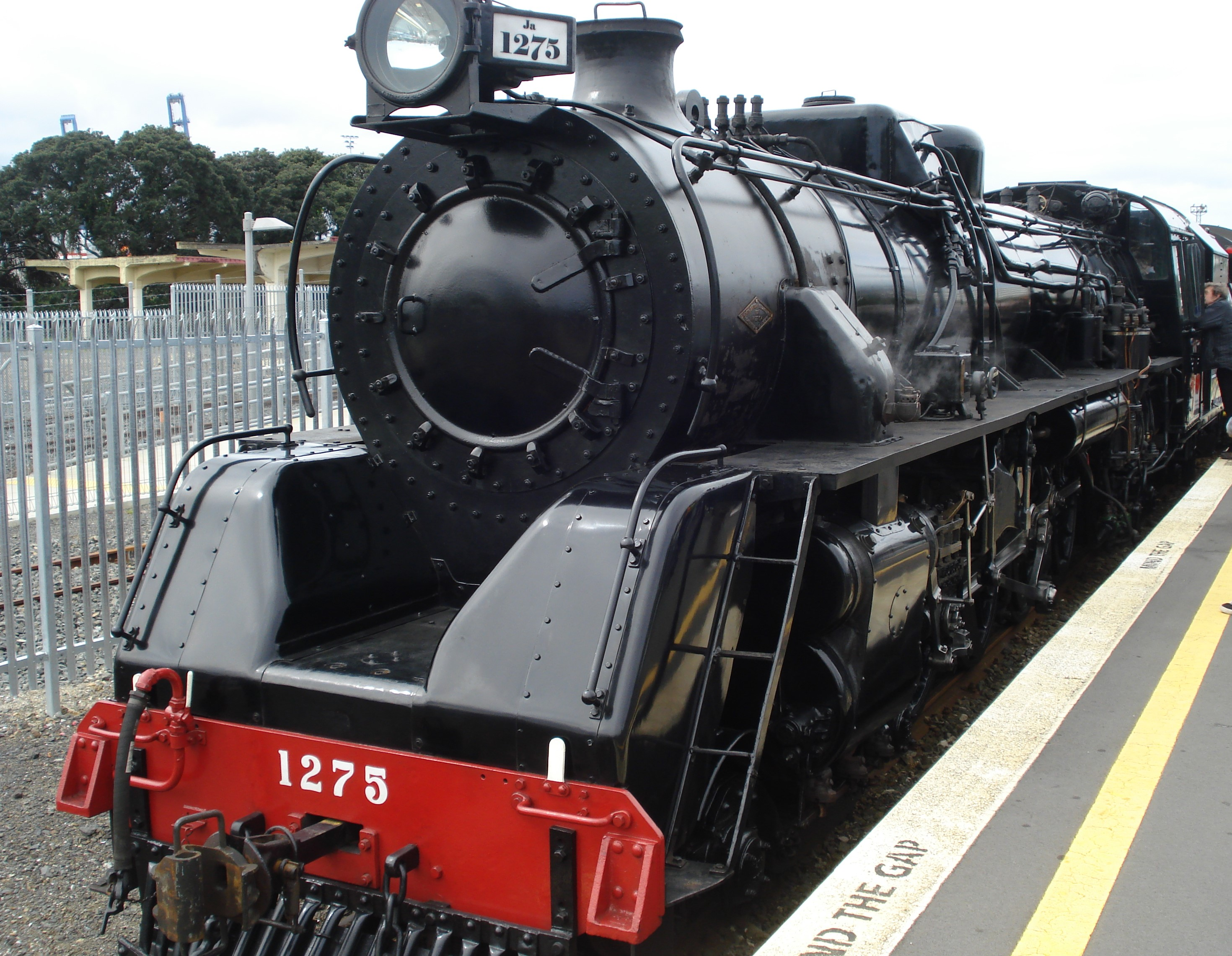
NZR JA class loco 1275 at The Strand Station, Auckland on 29 September 2013

- Hamilton railway station, Hamilton - 3 October 2013
- Mount Maunganui railway station, Tauranga - 5 October 2013
- Stratford railway station, Stratford - 7 October 2013
- Palmerston North railway station, Palmerston North - 9 October 2013
- Wellington railway station, Wellington - 12 October 2013
- Greymouth railway station, Greymouth - 15 October 2013
- Invercargill railway station, Invercargill – 17 October 2013
- Dunedin railway station, Dunedin - 19 October 2013
- Oamaru railway station, Oamaru - 21 October 2013
- Timaru railway station, Timaru - 23 October 2013
- Lyttelton railway station, Christchurch - 26 October 2013

The Mainline Steam Heritage Trust also commenced their part for the celebrations on 19 October 2013 with a steam excursion from Auckland to Northland hauled by J^{A} 1275 and returned the next day. On 21 October 2013, they commenced J^{A} 1240's delivery trip from Auckland with being towed by DL 9014 to Wellington with two days in Picton and then to Christchurch on 24 October 2013. Also during later that day Silver Fern railcar RM 24 arrived in Christchurch from Dunedin.

On 25 October 2013, D^{G} 772 from the Diesel Traction Group and D^{J} 1209 from the Dunedin Railways hauled an excursion from Christchurch to Kaikōura and return. On 26 October 2013, Ja 1240 hauled an excursion to Arthur's Pass and returned and the D^{G} and D^{J} hauled an excursion to the Weka Pass Railway while the Canterbury Railway Society ran trains at the Ferrymead Heritage Park, with Mainline Steam's K^{A} 942 and the Silver Fern Railcar running trips between Ferrymead and Lyttelton. The Plains Vintage Railway & Historical Museum ran night runs with their locomotives A 64 and Oamaru Steam & Rail Restoration Societys B 10.

On 27 October 2013, Ferrymead held another open day, running their own and visiting locomotives while The Plains Railway were also running the A and B class locomotives. On M28 October 2013, JA 1240 headed off to Timaru with the "Timaru Flyer". The Plains Railway again ran the B class locomotive and K 88. The Silver Fern railcar was running trips between Christchurch and Rolleston, and Christchurch and Rangiora. On the following day, Mainline Steam ran a four-day excursion from Christchurch to Greymouth and then to Westport on 30 and 31 October 2013 returning to Greymouth and Christchurch. On 29 October 2013, the Silver Fern Railcar ran a train from Christchurch to Springfield and return. It headed back to Dunedin on Friday 1 November 2013.

== See also ==
- Ferrymead 125 - similar event held in 1988
