= Daffodil Days =

Daffodil Days may refer to:

- Daffodil Day (Canada), a campaign organised by the Canadian Cancer Society since 1957
- A similar campaign organised by the American Cancer Society since the 1970s
- Daffodil Day (Australia), the Cancer Council Australia version of the event, running since 1986
- Daffodil Day (Ireland), the Irish Cancer Society's version of the campaign, running since 1988
- The Cancer Society of New Zealand's version of the campaign, running since 1990
- Liga proti rakovine (Slovakia) version of the campaign, running since 1997
