= Rail Safety Week =

Rail safety campaign in Australia and New Zealand

Rail Safety Week is an Australasian (Australia and New Zealand) public safety campaign held every year on the second week of August. It raises awareness on how to stay safe near level crossings and has been run since 2007. The New Zealand campaign is run by KiwiRail and TrackSAFE New Zealand.

== History ==
=== New Zealand ===
The campaign first started on 23 July 2007, a Monday, after growing concerns about safety on the rail network. It made its debut with advertisements on major television channels (which were developed in Australia). The advertisements featured Chris Cairns, detailing his sister's death to a level crossing in 1993. The advertisements received numerous complains about being "too shocking" and "too graphic". In Auckland, the campaign included school programmes and prints.

The 2008 campaign included the same advertisements shown in 2007, and were also run in sporting functions and stadiums throughout the country.

The 2009 Rail Safety Week started on 25 July 2009 with a new television advertisement. It was also supported by radio and print.

By the time the 2010 campaign started, there had been 152 rail-related deaths. The 2010 campaign was called "Call it in," encouraging people to report near-collisions at level crossings. It ran from 23 to 29 August. It also included billboards, school visits and a display of a car wreck from a collision.

The 2011 campaign included a display of a level crossing car collision at The Base shopping centre in Hamilton with the message "Stay Clear. Stay Safe". It also included a rail safety roadshow, a visit by Chris Cairns to schools in Napier, and a new website.

The 2012 campaign ran between 13 and 19 August. Its slogan was "Expect trains", encouraging people that they can be hit by a train in a car, as it is most associated with being hit while walking. The 2013 campaign ran between 12 and 18 August, focusing on pedestrians, telling people to use their "train brain". In 2014, the campaign included a virtual reality train experience where users can drive and stop locomotives. The slogan of the 2015 campaign was "Expect trains", further reinforcing the idea that people in cars can be hit by trains. There was a "Cops in Cabs" event where the Police rode in locomotive cabs to experience what it is like to be near or in a collision. School children in Christchurch experienced a locomotive training simulator, and the NZTA launched a television campaign about driver behaviour at level crossings. In 2016, the campaign included a video filmed at a level crossing in Lower Hutt, where multiple near misses had occurred. The 2017 campaign included a television advertisement which interviews train drivers who experienced collisions or near misses. They talked about the impact that it had on them and their families. It won a film award.

The 2018 week's slogan was "Whatever your look, always look for trains", and ran between 13 and 19 August. Multiple schools in Wellington did rail safety tours.

In 2019, the week included the installation of 'near miss memorials' at level crossings, which were half crosses with a QR code on them linking to a video of a real near miss and a story on how it impacted the train driver. There was also a virtual field trip, where approximately 1200 students enrolled in and web conferences with rail experts.

The 2021 week ran between 9 and 15 August, and focussed on rural areas. For 2022, it ran between 8 and 14 August with the slogan "Blow to the left and to the right, for safe travels". Before the week, KiwiRail and TrackSAFE started an unbranded campaign on places such as Reddit, train and travel blogs, and Wikipedia. Online influencers were encouraged to create content about their behaviours around rail, and then KiwiRail and TrackSAFE themselves followed by promoting these online posts.

The 2023 campaign included a character called Steely Stan, encouraging people to look to the left and right before crossing a track. It includes the phrase, "Steely Stare. Steely Stare. All clear."
