= NZ Book Month =

Non-profit initiative in NZ (2006–2014)

2008 NZ Book Month logo

NZ Book Month was a non-profit initiative started in 2006, with the goal of increasing readership of New Zealand books. It was a nationwide annual event held in September from 2006 to 2008, in October 2009, March from 2010 to 2013, and August 2014. Activities included speeches by local and international authors, literary and poetry readings, exhibitions, book launches, festivals, children's storytelling, blogging, quizzes, and the distribution of book vouchers. The event ended in 2015 because of a lack of funding.

== The Six Pack ==
From 2006 to 2008, NZ Book Month ran a national competition calling for any New Zealand writer – published or unpublished – to submit their best piece of new writing (fiction, non-fiction, essay or poetry) for inclusion in The Six Pack; a collectable book that saw the six best pieces of work put together in an annual anthology. Each winner also received NZ$$5,000. Five of the winning entries were chosen by a panel of judges and the sixth winner was chosen by New Zealand readers in an online poll. The Six Pack retailed for NZ$6 and thousands of copies were distributed free to libraries and schools all over the country.

=== Winners ===
The 2006 winners were:

- Brian Turner, poet.
- Briar Grace-Smith, playwright.
- Kingi McKinnon.
- Philippa Swan, landscape artist and journalist.
- Henry Feltham.
- Phoebe Wright, high school student.

The 2007 winners were:

- Dave Armstrong, scriptwriter and 2008 writer in residence at Victoria University of Wellington.
- Charlotte Grimshaw, shortlisted for the 2008 Frank O'Connor International Short Story Award.
- Jennifer Lane.
- Faith Oxenbridge.
- Tracey Slaughter, emerging novelist and poet.
- Elizabeth Smither, poet, novelist and former Te Mata Estate Poet Laureate.
