= Albert Cameron Hunt =

American electrician

Albert Cameron Hunt (3 April 1857 – 2 October 1915) was an American electrician who invented the wigwag, a grade crossing signal used in transportation. Hunt, a mechanical engineer from Southern California, invented the wigwag in the early 1900s because of the need for a safer railroad grade crossing. Hunt was associated with the Pacific Electric interurban streetcar railroad.

Hunt was born in Freeport, Illinois, the son of Alexander Cameron Hunt, governor of the Territory of Colorado from 1867–69, and Ellen Kellogg. He died of neurosyphilis in 1915.
