= Crossbuck =

Sign with level crossings, often in a cross

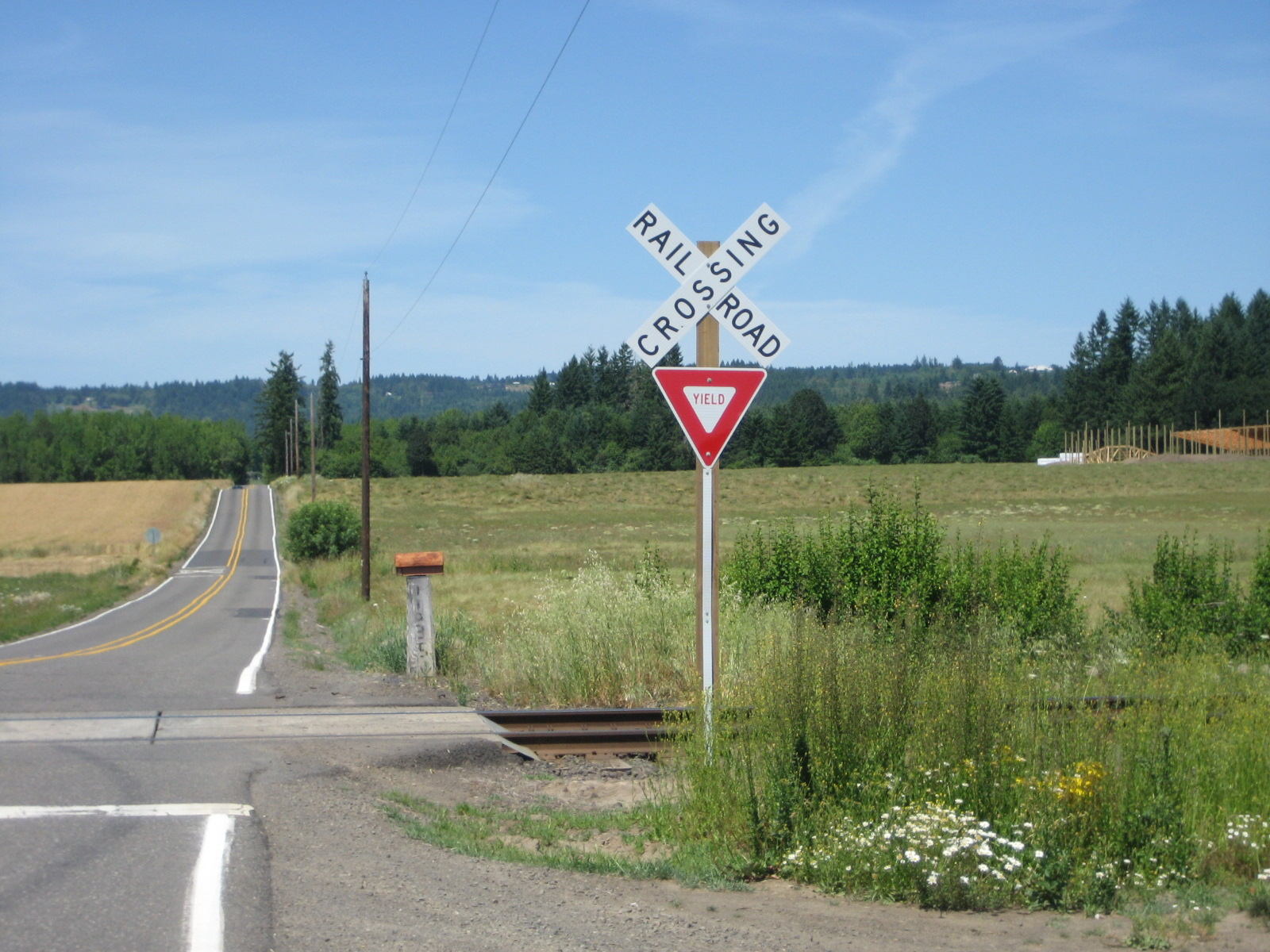
An American crossbuck paired with a yield sign

A crossbuck is a traffic sign used to indicate a level railway crossing. It is composed of two slats of wood or metal of equal length, fastened together on a pole in a saltire formation (resembling the letter X). Crossbucks are often supplemented by electrical warnings of flashing lights, a bell, and/or a boom barrier that descends to block the road and prevent traffic from crossing the tracks.

== Vienna Convention ==
The Vienna Convention on Road Signs and Signals, a multilateral treaty of the United Nations with the intention of standardizing traffic signs around the world, prescribes several different regulations for the "crossbuck" sign.

The sign should consist of two arms not less than 1.2 metres (3.9 ft) long, crossed in the form of an X. The first model may have a white or yellow background with a thick red or black border. The second model may have a white or yellow background with a thin black border and an inscription, for example, "railroad crossing", "railway crossing", etc. If lateral clearance obstructs the placement of the sign, it may be rotated 90° so that its points are directed vertically. If used at a level crossing with more than one track, a half cross or a supplementary plate stating the number of tracks may be added below.

It specified these models:

A-28a-V1-1

A-28a-V1-2

A-28a-V1-1-EA

28a-V1-2-EA

A-28c-V1-1

It also specified multi-track models:

A-28b-V1-1

A-28b-V1-2

A-28b-V1-1-EA

A-28b-V1-2-EA

A-28c-V3-1

== Variants around the world ==
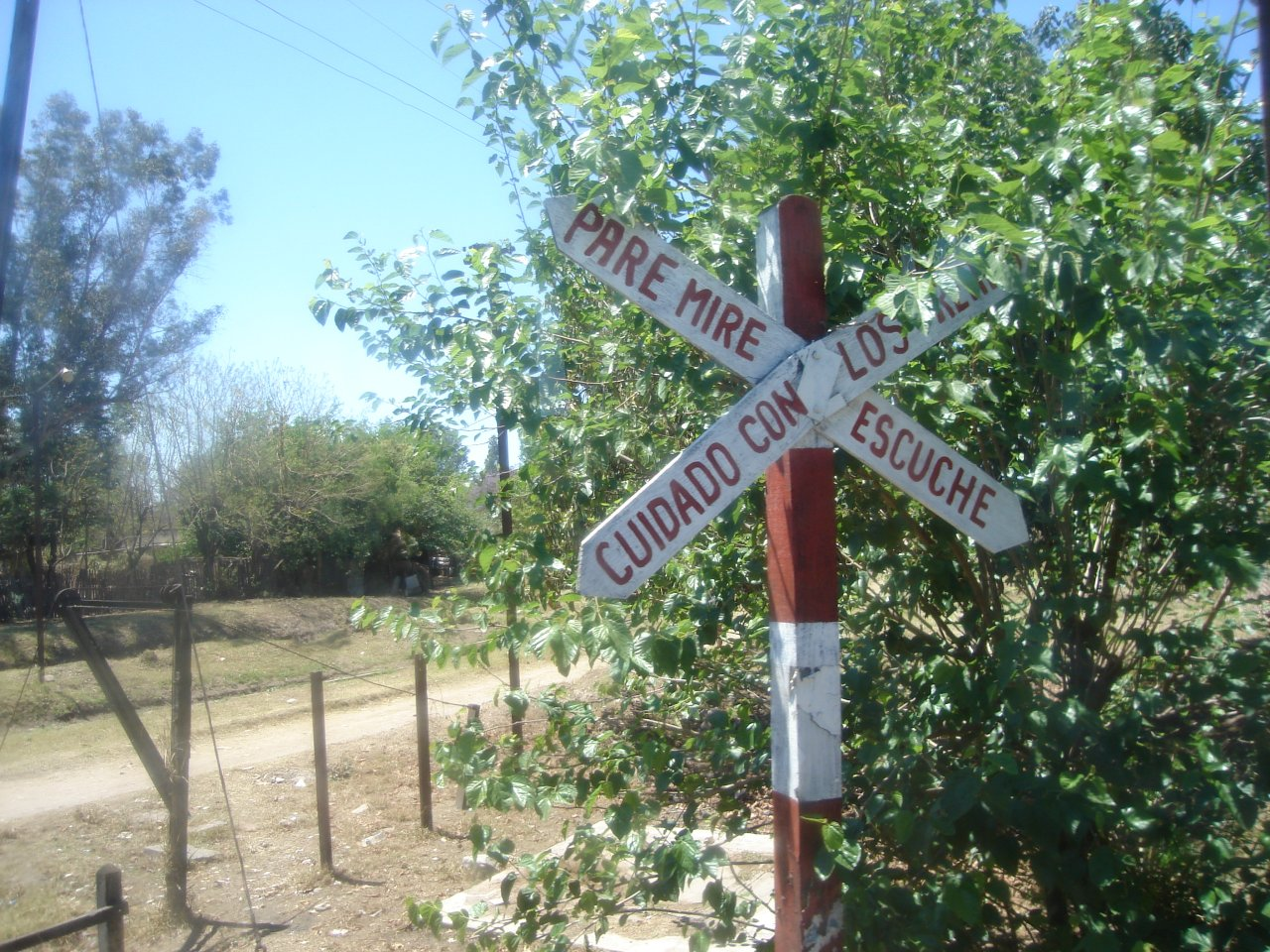
A disused warning cross in Argentina

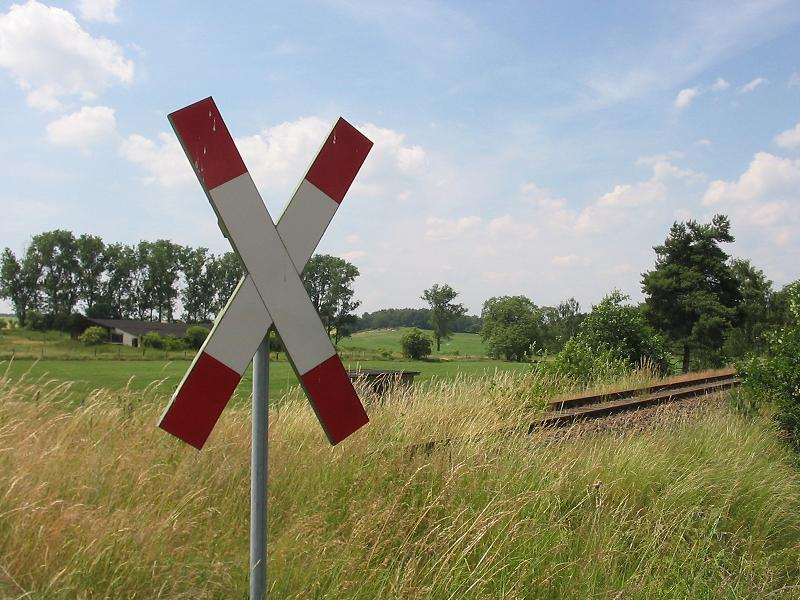
German crossbuck, half red and white

In the United States, the crossbuck carries the words "rail" and "road" on one arm and "crossing" on the other ("rail" and "road" are separated by the "crossing" arm), in black text on a white background. Older variants simply used black and white paint; newer installations use a reflective white material with non-reflective lettering. Some antique U.S. crossbucks were painted in other color schemes, and used glass "cat's eye" reflectors on the letters to make them stand out. Other countries, such as China, also use this layout, but with appropriately localized terms. Often, a supplemental sign below the crossbuck indicates the number of tracks at the crossing. In the 1990s, the state of Ohio experimented with the modified Buckeye Crossbuck, which had a specialized accompanying plate.

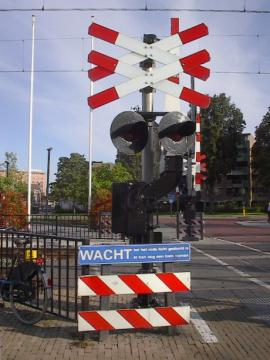
Dutch crossbuck with flash lights

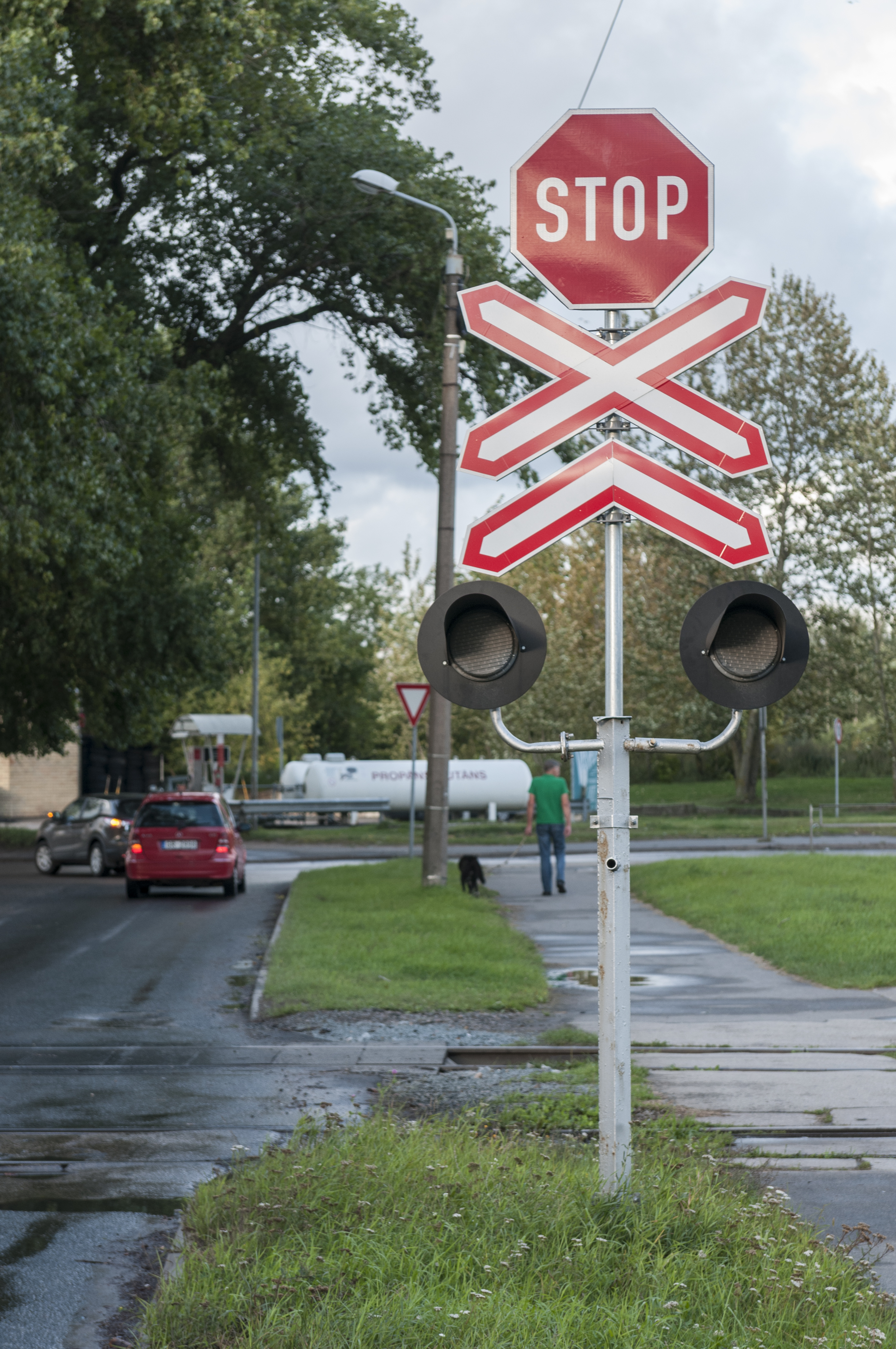
Latvian crossbuck with a stop sign and lights

In Canada, crossbucks have a red border and no lettering. These were installed in the 1980s shortly after English-French bilingualism was made official, replacing signs of a style similar to those used in the U.S., except the word "railway" was used instead of "railroad" and in certain areas the words "traverse de chemin de fer" were used.

In Mexico, the crossbucks read "cruce de ferrocarril", a literal translation of its U.S. counterpart. Older designs read "cuidado con el tren", meaning "beware of the train."

In Argentina, the most common legend is "peligro ferrocarril" ("danger: railroad"). Other crosses also read "cuidado con los trenes – pare mire escuche" ("beware of the trains – stop, look, listen") for the Ferrocarril Belgrano, "paso a nivel – ferro carril" ("level crossing - railroad") for the Ferrocarril Mitre and "cuidado con los trenes" ("beware of the trains") for the Ferrocarril Roca.

In parts of Europe, the cross is white with red trimmings or ends, sometimes on a rectangular background; in Finland and Greece the cross is yellow, trimmed with red.

Taiwan uses two crossbucks: a version with a yellow and black cross, and one with the cross in white with a red border. A special symbol in the center indicates an electric railroad crossing, cautioning road users about excessive height cargo that may contact the electric wires.

In Australia, the crossbuck is a St Andrews Cross as in Europe, but uses words and the same color as the American crossbuck. In contrast to the American "railroad crossing", Australian signs say "railway crossing" or "tramway crossing." Most cases where a tram in its own right-of-way crosses a road do not use a crossbuck and so are regular intersections rather than level crossings.

Different countries may classify the sign differently. For example, in Australia it is considered a regulatory sign, while in close neighbour New Zealand it is considered a warning sign. Some countries, such as Australia, France, New Zealand, Slovakia and Slovenia may place the crossbuck design on a "target board", while other countries quite often do not. In the United Kingdom, it is only used for crossings with no barriers.

=== Crossbucks of the world ===
Australia (variant)

Austria

Austria (vertical)

Austria (variant)

Belgium

Brazil

Bosnia and Herzegovina, Croatia, North Macedonia, Singapore and Slovenia

Bulgaria

Canada

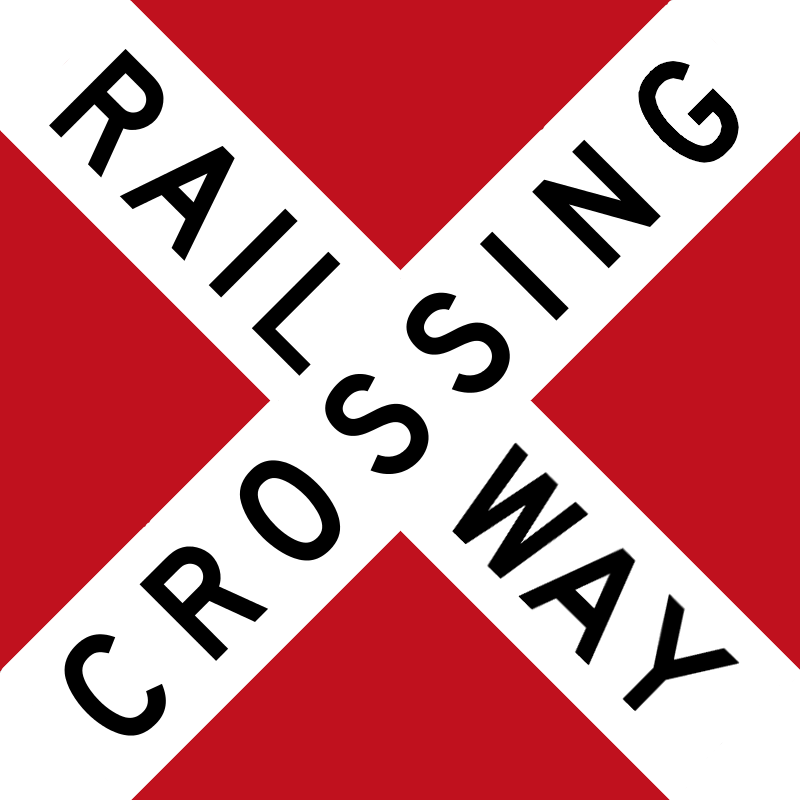
Canada (former)

Canada (former)

Canada (former)

Canada (used in Ontario in the 1950s)

Canada (formerly used in Quebec)

Central American Integration System Member States

Chile

Colombia (former)

Denmark

Germany and Slovakia

Germany and Slovakia (level crossings on electrified lines)

Italy

Japan, Taiwan, Myanmar

Mexico

Netherlands

New Zealand

New Zealand (variant)

Norway

Panama

Peru

Poland

Romania

Romania (variant used for railway crossings without gates and lights)

South Korea

Sweden

Thailand

United States

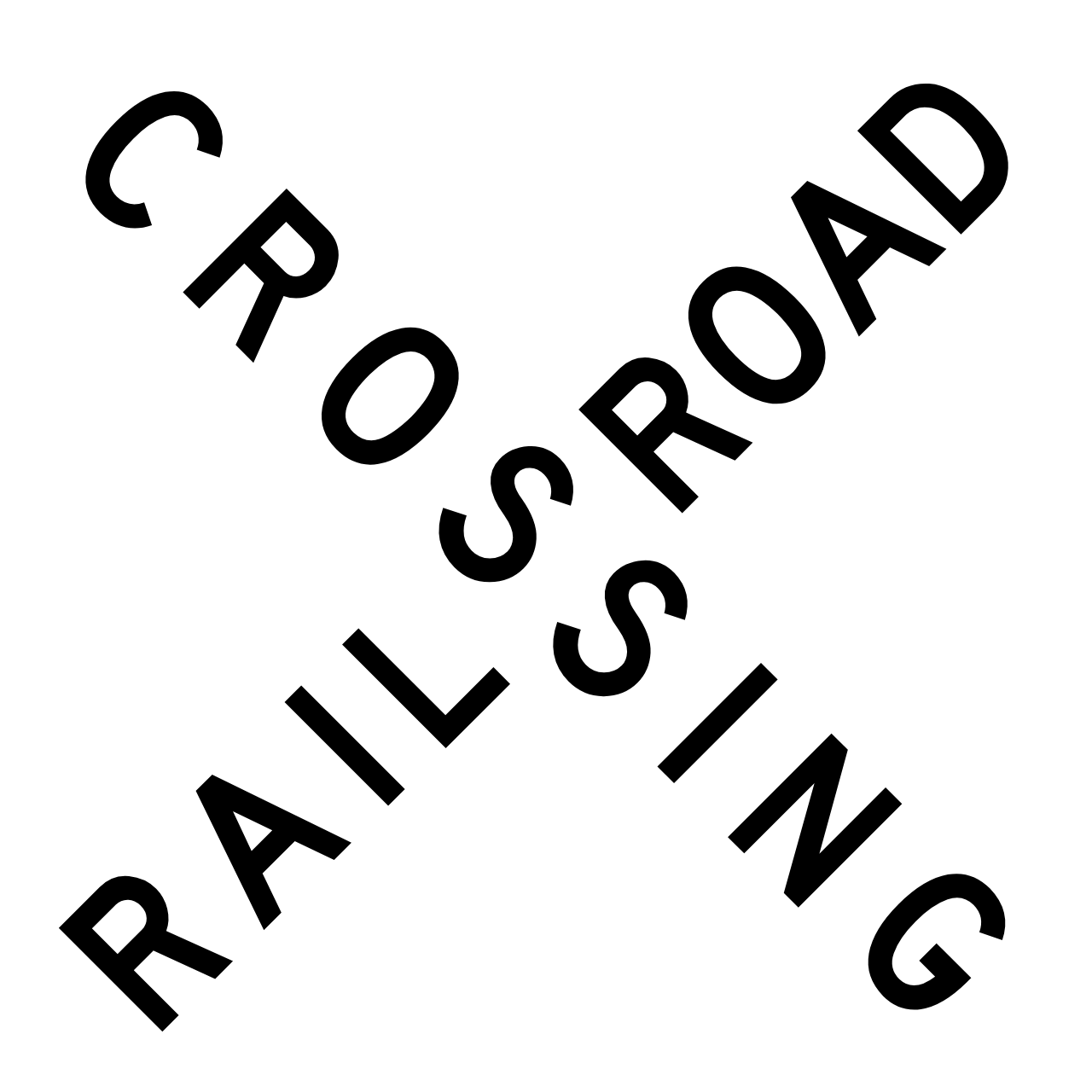
United States (inverted variant)

United States (experimental version used in Ohio for a time)

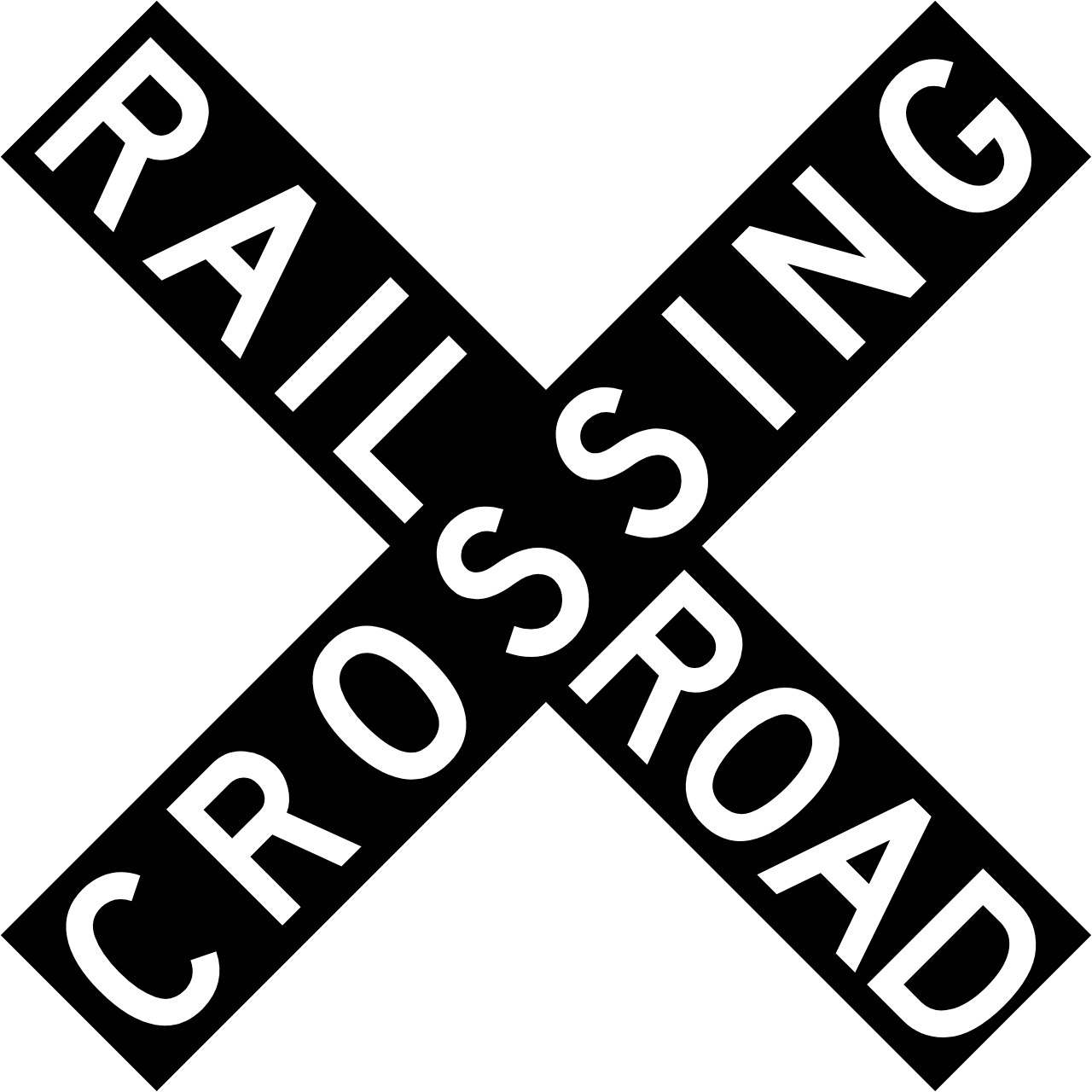
United States (variant, former)

Venezuela

Vietnam

== Multiple tracks ==
Several countries use a sign to indicate that multiple tracks must be crossed at a level crossing. In Australia, Canada, New Zealand, and the U.S., a sign is mounted beneath the crossbuck (above the warning light assembly, if any) with the number of tracks. Many European countries use multiple crossbucks or additional chevrons ("half-crossbucks") below the first one. Taiwan also uses half-crossbucks below the regular crossbuck.

Argentina

Austria

Austria

Austria (variant)

Bangladesh

Belgium

Bosnia and Herzegovina, Croatia, North Macedonia and Slovenia

Bulgaria

Cambodia

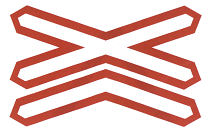
China

Czechia

Denmark

Estonia

Finland

France

Greece

Hungary

Hungary

Indonesia (variant)

Italy

Latvia

Luxembourg

Netherlands

Norway

Poland

Portugal

Romania

Romania (variant used for railway crossings without gates and lights)

Russia

Serbia

Slovenia (former)

Spain

Sweden

Switzerland

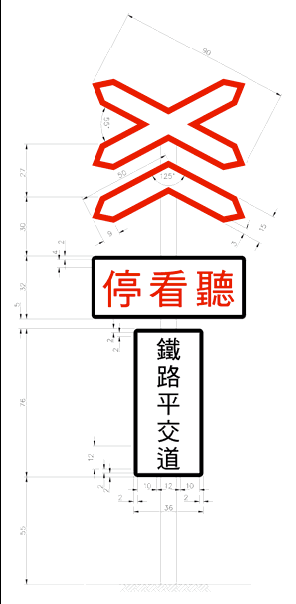
Taiwan (variant)

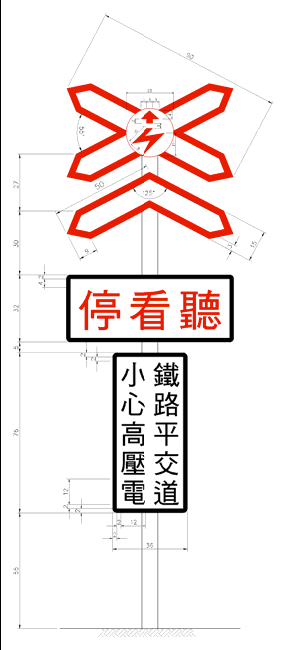
Taiwan (variant used for electrified railway crossings)

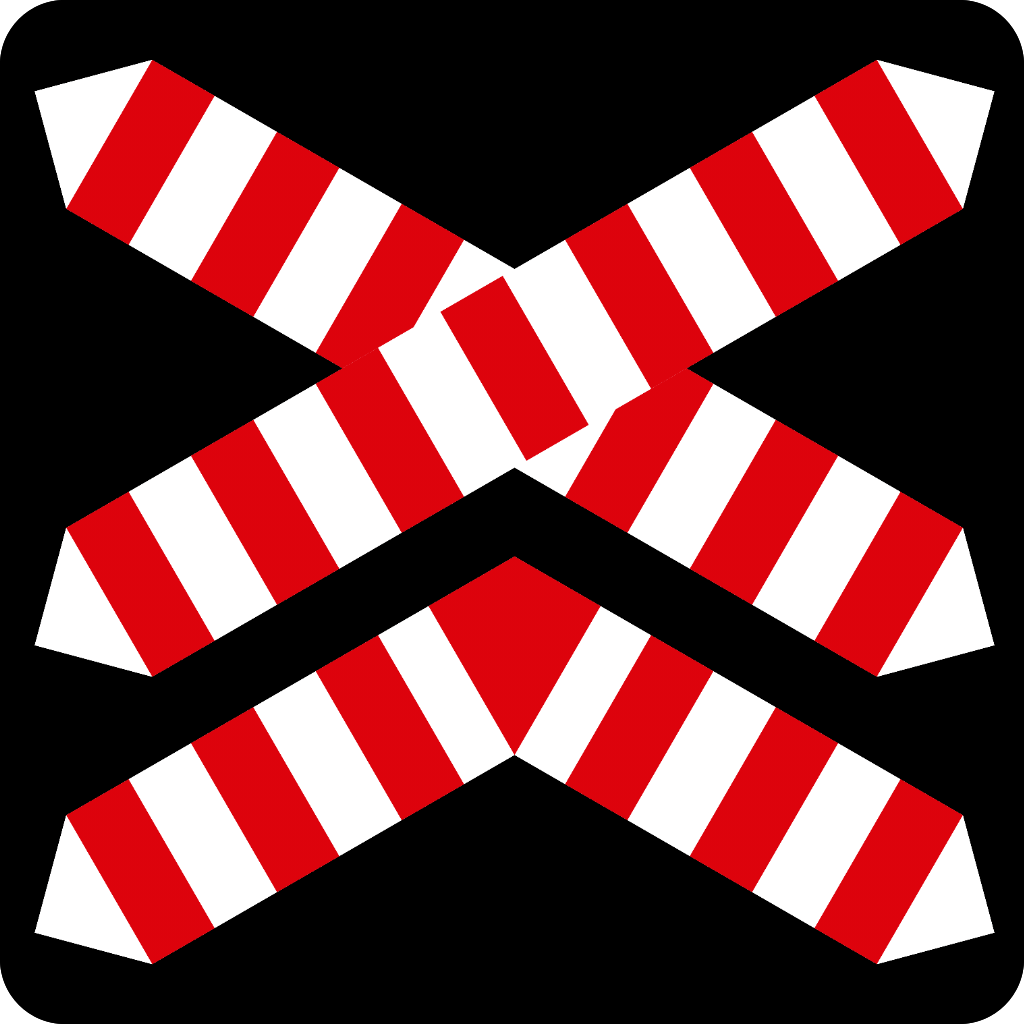
Tunisia

Turkey (variant)

Ukraine

Vietnam

== Advance warning ==
Several countries include the crossbuck icon on their railway crossing ahead warning signs. In Argentina, railway crossing ahead signs used a common red-bordered triangle defaced with a black steam locomotive icon placed on white background according Vienna Convention as well as the most other countries in the world outside of the Americas. (Note: Used for unprotected railway crossings in most other countries in the world. In Argentina, Germany, Israel — it is used for both protected and unprotected railway crossing ahead signs.)

Vienna Convention; Aa-26b-V1

Vienna Convention; Ab-26b-V1

Australia

Australia (former)

Australia (side road)

Australia (variant with warning lights)

Canada

Canada (variant for left-skewed crossing)

Canada (variant for right-skewed crossing)

Canada (former)

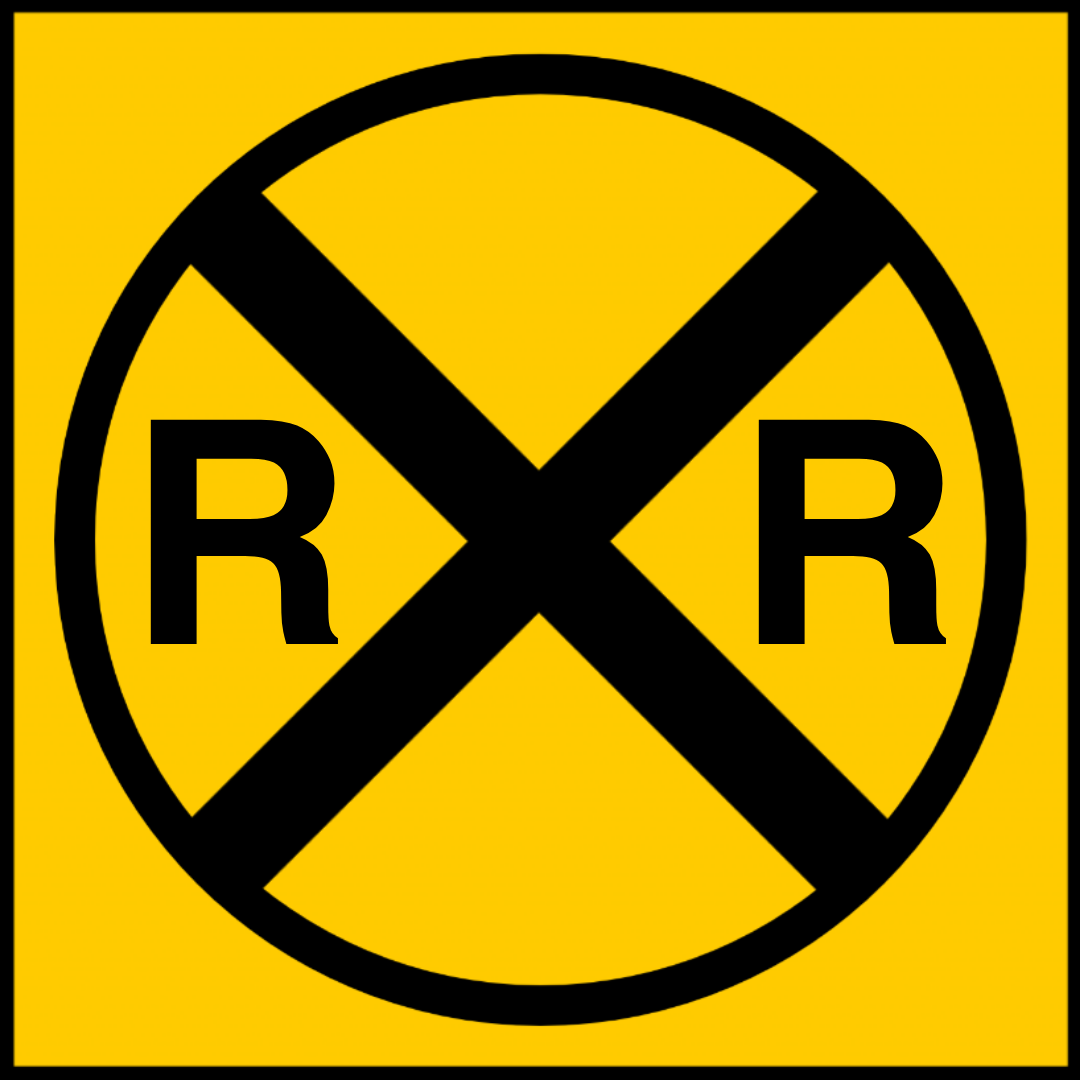
Iraq

Panama (variant for railroad crossings without gates but with lights)

Philippines

United States

United States (exempt railroad crossing, the usual requirement for commercial and mass transit vehicles to stop at the crossing regardless of activity on the line need not be obeyed)
