= Level Cross =

Level Cross may refer to:

- Level crossing, intersection where a road crosses a railway at the same level
  - Level crossing signals, services used to warn pedestrians and drivers of incoming trains at level crossings
  - Level crossings by country
- Level Cross, Randolph County, North Carolina
- Level Cross, Surry County, North Carolina
- Level Cross (film), a 2024 Indian film

== See also ==
- At-grade (disambiguation)
