= At-grade =

At-grade may refer to:

- At-grade intersection, a crossing between roads on the same level
- Road junction
- Level crossing, where a road or path crosses a railway on the same level
- Diamond crossing, where two railway tracks cross
- At-grade railway, at level with the general surface

== See also ==
- Level Cross (disambiguation)
- Grade separation, the opposite of at-grade
- Junction (rail), where rail routes meet or cross on the same level
- Street running, where the train, tram or rapid transit run within the street
