= Level crossings by country =

List of level railroad crossings

Designs of level crossings, where railway lines cross roads or other paths, vary from country to country.

== Europe ==
There were 108,196 level crossings in the European Union Member States in 2014. On average there are just under 0.5 level crossings per line-kilometre in the EU.

53% of all those level crossings are active level, where users are protected from or warned of approaching trains by devices activated when it is unsafe for the user to traverse the crossing. The remaining 47% of level crossings are unprotected. 28% of railway fatalities are from level crossing related incidents.

Number of level crossings in selected UNECE countries Source: UNECE
Member country	Number of level crossings
Belarus	1,746
Denmark	1,024
Greece	1,263
Italy	4,072
Latvia	652
Lithuania	543
Luxembourg	117
Poland	12,801
Romania	5,040
Sweden	6,911
Turkey	2,681

=== Belgium ===
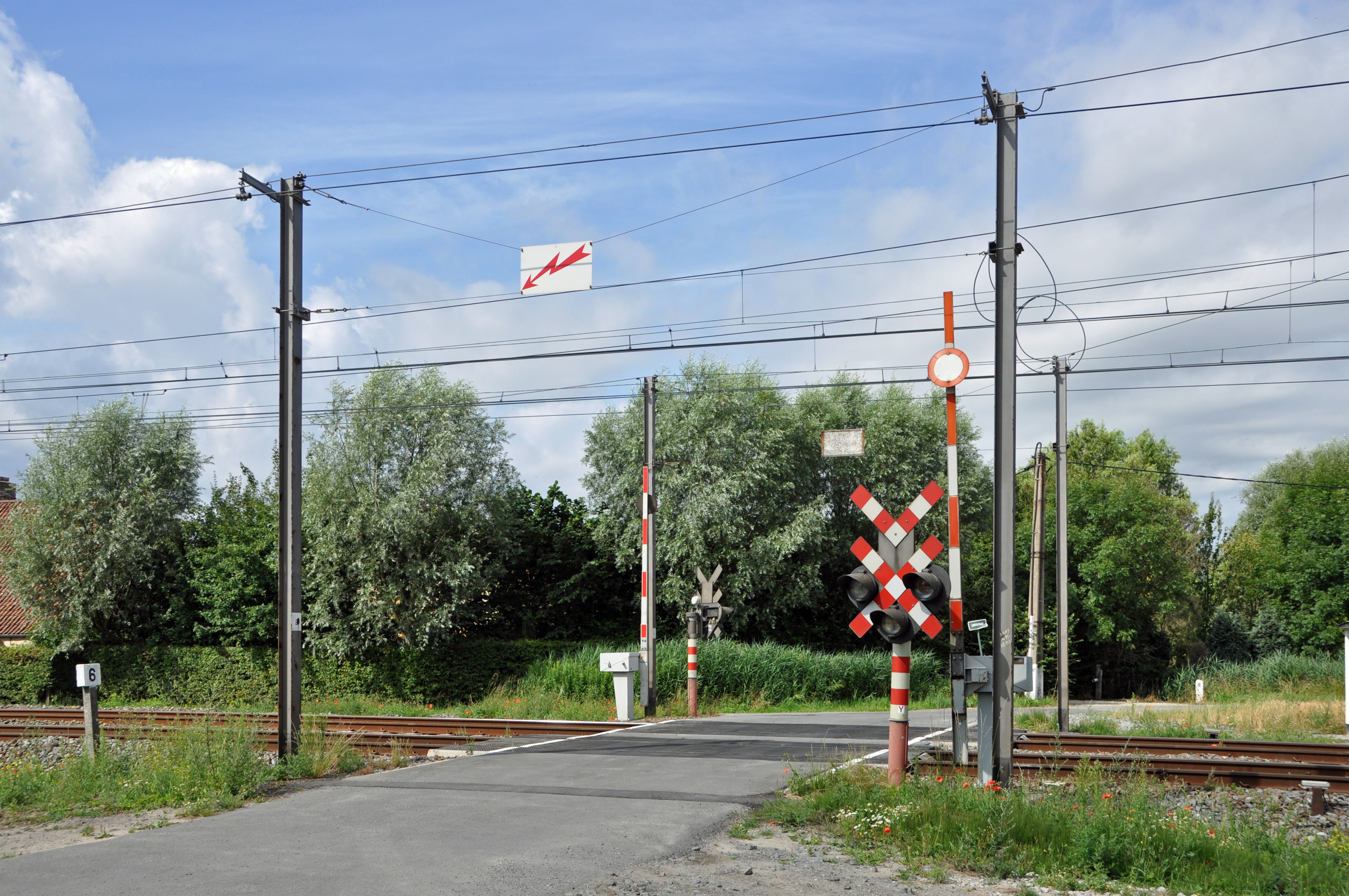
Belgian level crossing

Automatic level crossings in Belgium have two red lights, usually can be used with a single white light, electronic bells (originally used mechanical bells) and usually can be equipped with barriers. The bells used are similar to the ones used in Netherlands, replacing the old mechanical bells that rings until the barriers are fully lowered. The white light flashes for half a second at regular intervals to inform all drivers and pedestrians that they can cross the level crossing, and that the device is in working order, if there are no trains approaching. In some cases, the white light is absent; in that case overtaking on the crossing is not allowed (if there are no barriers). The bells starts to ring until the barriers are fully lowered and then usually stop. If the barriers are absent, the bell will continue ring until the trains have been passed. Some crossings have only crossbucks, and also sometimes traffic lights ahead to warn drivers of an approaching crossing with yellow warning lights on a traffic light. They are also in use with two or three lights and without barriers on tramways at De Panne (until 2021), Zwijndrecht (until 2019), Anderlues, Ghent, and MIVB Line 44 (only here with bells).

=== Estonia ===
Estonia

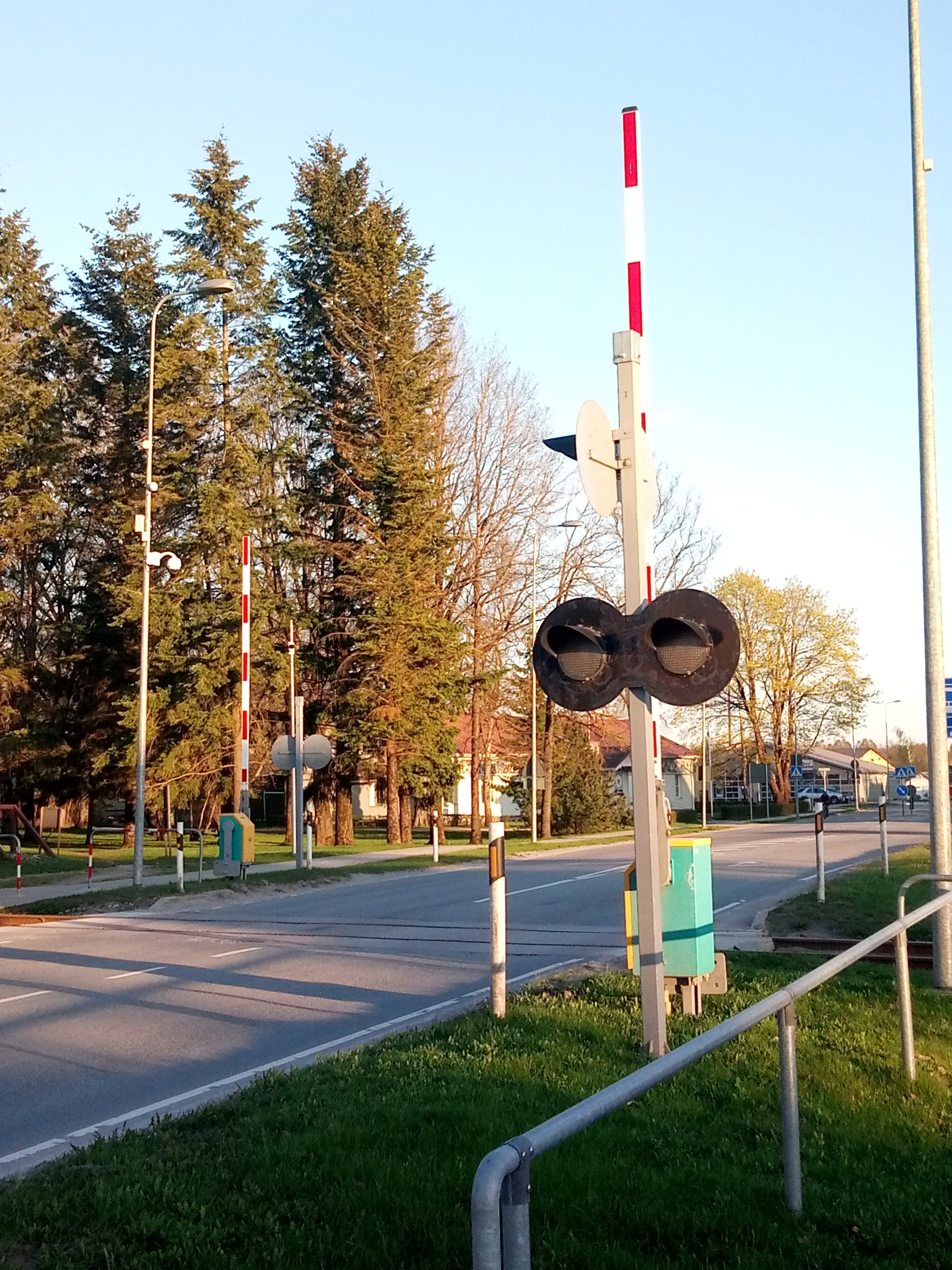
Gated level crossing in Türi, Estonia

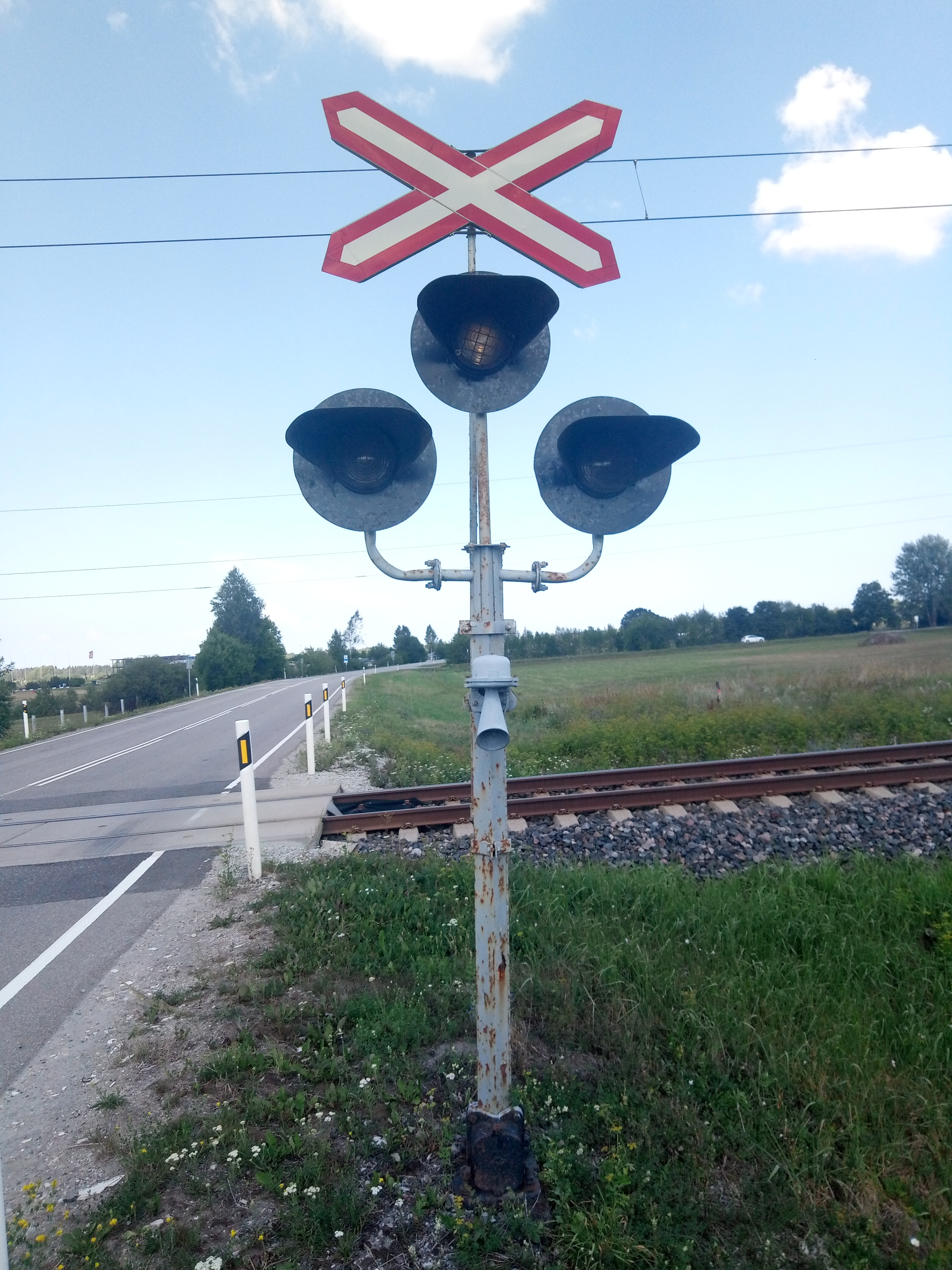
Ungated Svetofor type III-73 level crossing signal in Niitvälja, Estonia

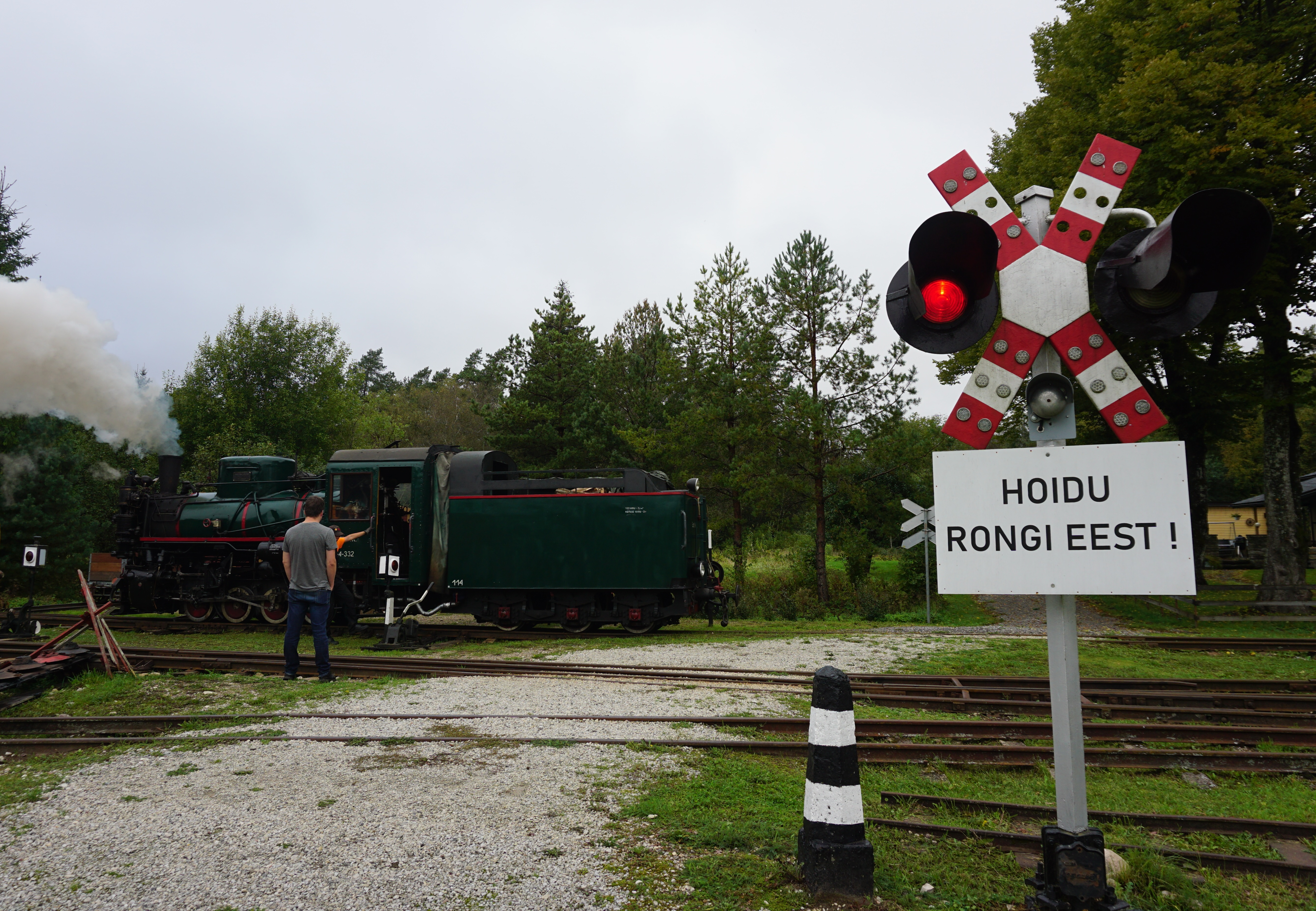
An early Svetofor type II-69 signal with 200mm SSSR lights in the Eesti Muuseumraudtee, Estonia

Most protected crossings are equipped with LED-lights. Some were used with incandescent lights (Svetofor equipment), which are used from USSR with a pole with bells (ZPT-12, ZPT-24, Revun-2), lights (150mm, 200mm), and gate mechanisms (ASH-26065U). Non-gated crossings have a crossbuck mounted, but gated ones do not. All gated crossings have half-barriers though some are marginally longer than others. Bells may vary. Many crossings use the same bell sound used on Polish crossings, very rarely fire alarms, sometimes a simple high pitch beep that sounds the same as the normal Romanian e-bell. Some non-gated crossings have a white flashing light that flashes when the crossing is clear. In less populated areas, crossings are mounted with just a crossbuck and sometimes a stop sign added below to indicate a small crossing. A few Svetofor signals was still remained, however, due to their obsolescence, they were already being replaced. Newly recently refurbished level crossings uses the stylized equipment that is similar to the Spanish level crossings; features LED lights, bells, and gates when is used. The crossings found on the lines maintained by Eesti Raudtee use a crossing information sign below the lights with a telephone number to call in case of an emergency.

=== Finland ===
Finland

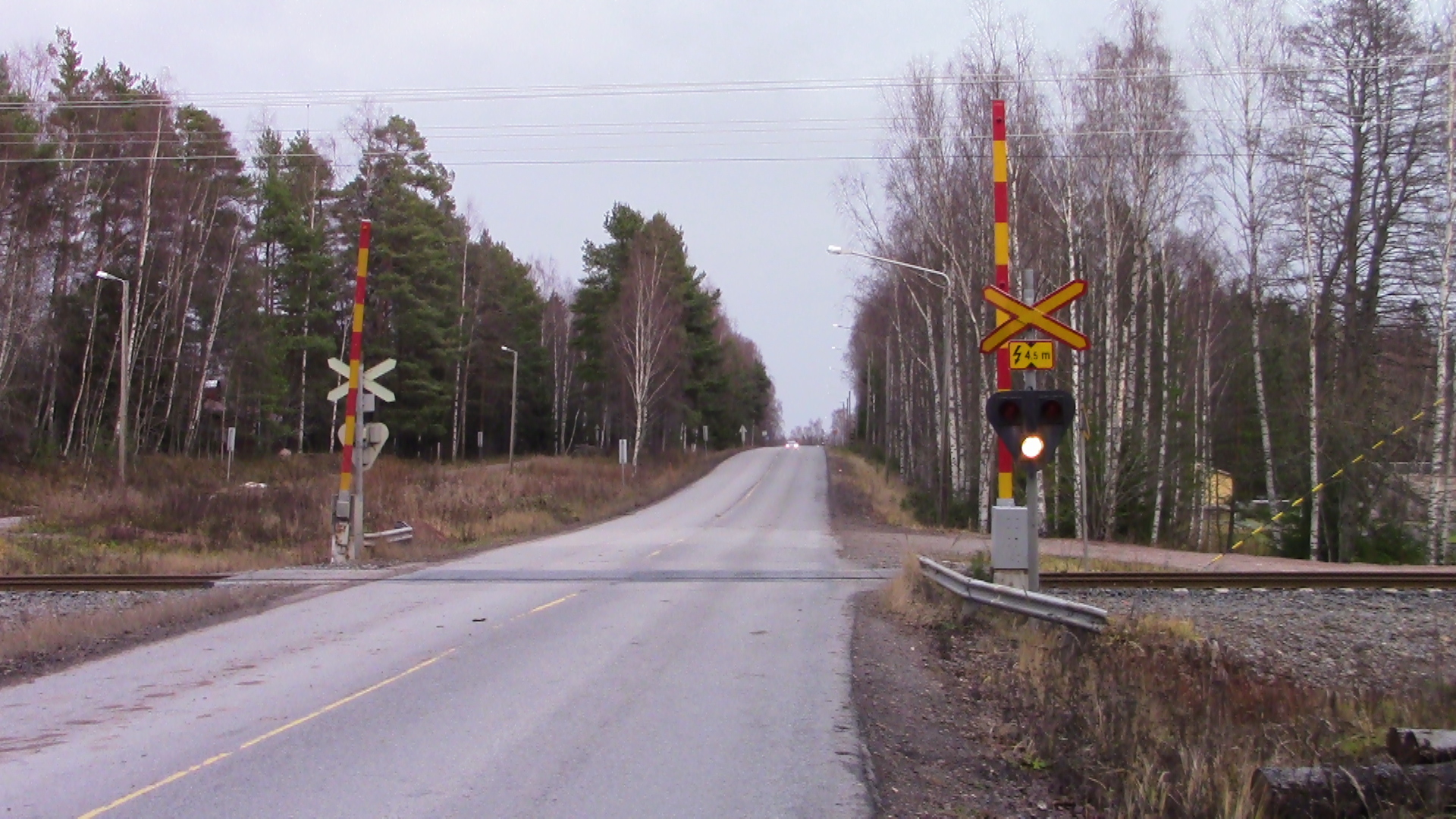
Finnish level crossing in Pori, Finland

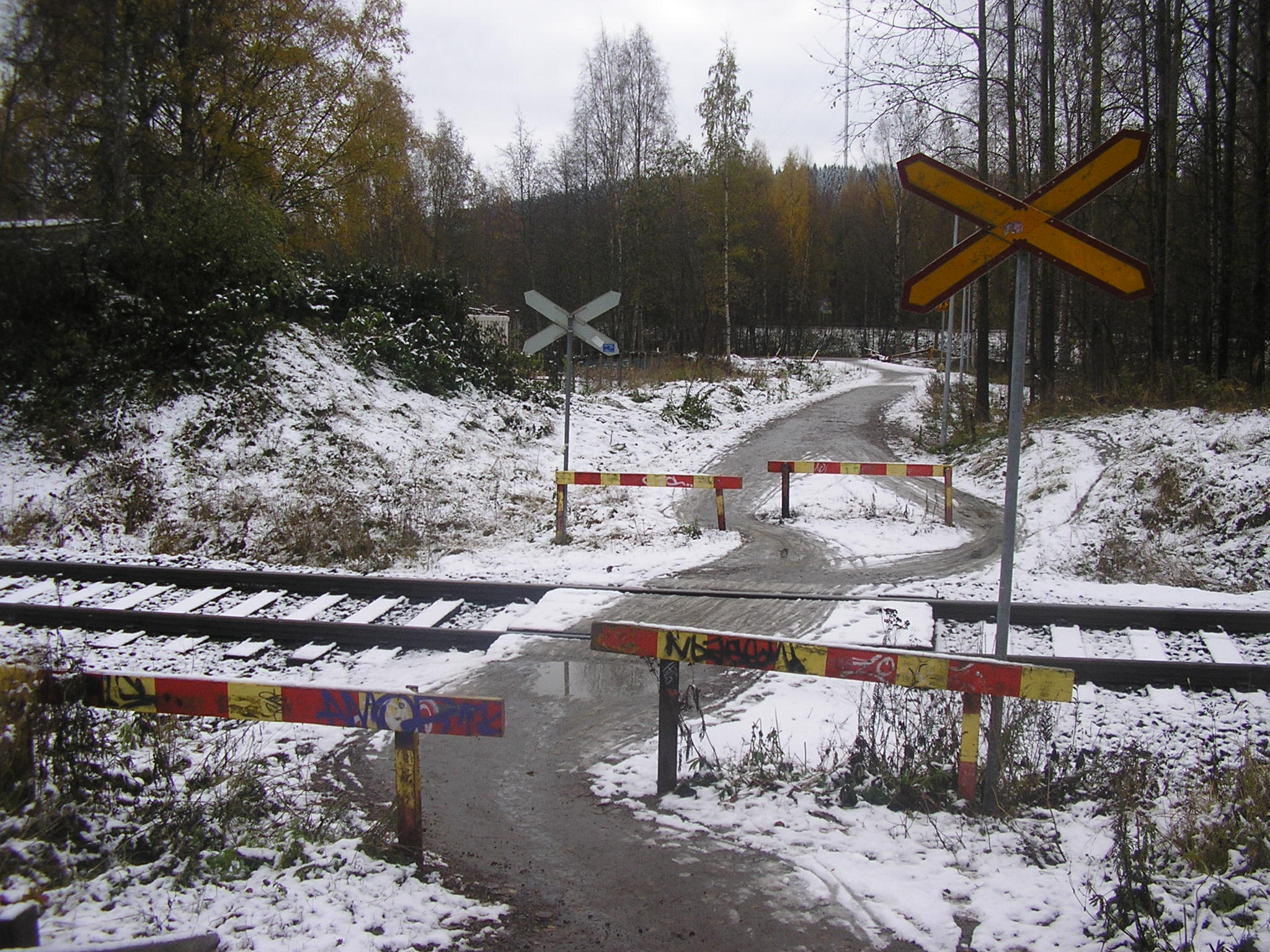
Pedestrian crossing on the Haapamäki–Jyväskylä track in Finland

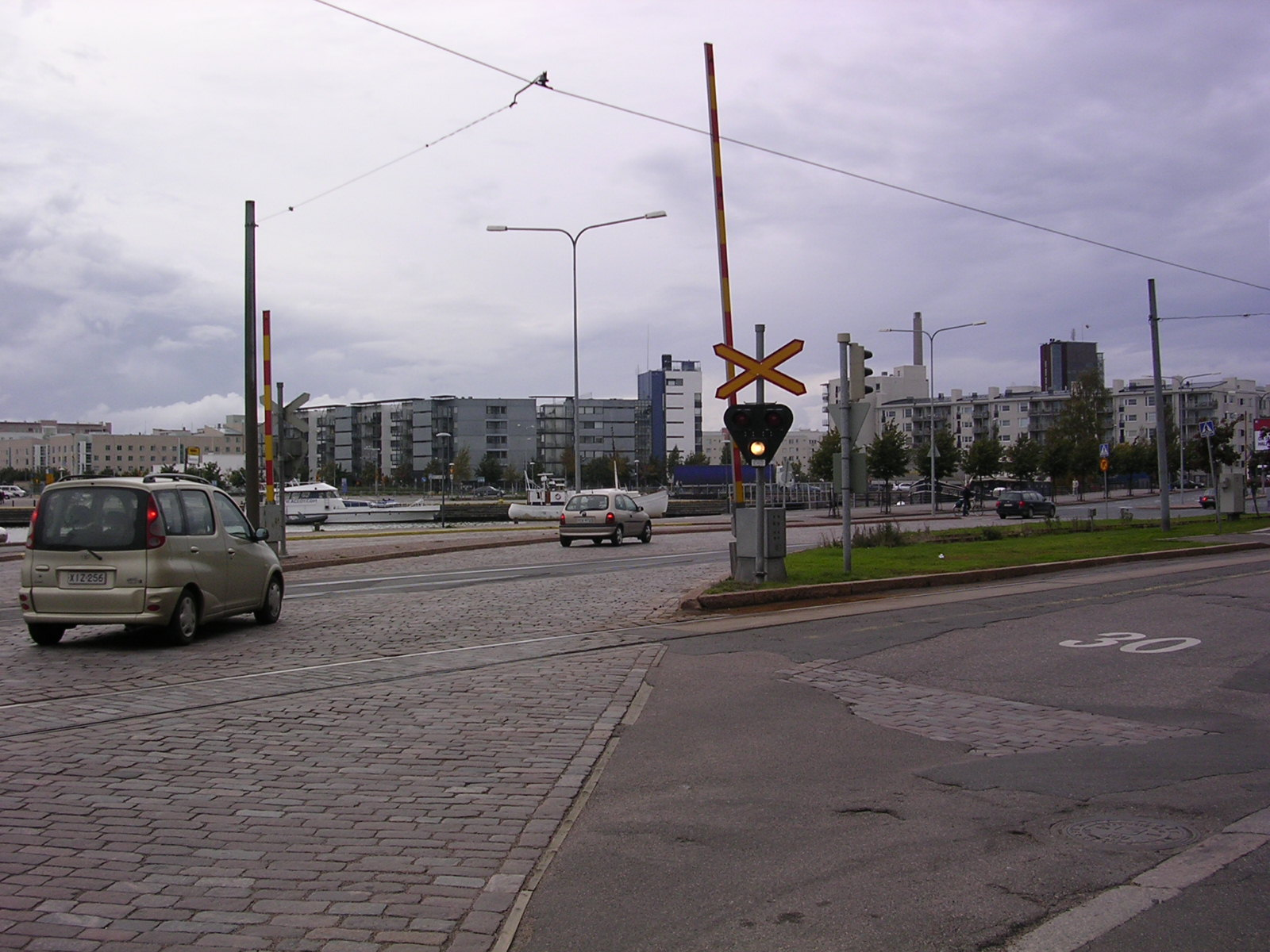
Level crossings with trams and Helsinki harbour rail in Helsinki, Finland

In Finland, level crossings with lights have the more common red light(s) and a white light that flashes except when the red light(s) flash. Most, but not all, crossings with lights also have barriers. Full-length barriers are usually used only for pedestrian and bicycle lanes. Half-length barriers are used for motor roads, to avoid the risk of a vehicle being trapped on the tracks between the barriers. Bells begin to ring when the red lights start flashing and usually stop when the barriers have come down. The Finnish crossbucks uses a yellow background with a red border are used on both controlled and uncontrolled level crossings. If there are two or more tracks in a crossing, the lower part of the crossbuck is used in a shape of a chevron. Only minor agricultural crossings may have no signs at all. On bigger roads there are usually also approach signs. Finnish level crossings are the sixth safest in Europe. Finland's state railway system has almost 3000 level crossings, according to TraFi. In Finland over the course of railway history many level crossing accidents have occurred, in comparison to Scandinavian countries. In Finland the maximum speed for trains on the rails with level crossings is 140 km/h.

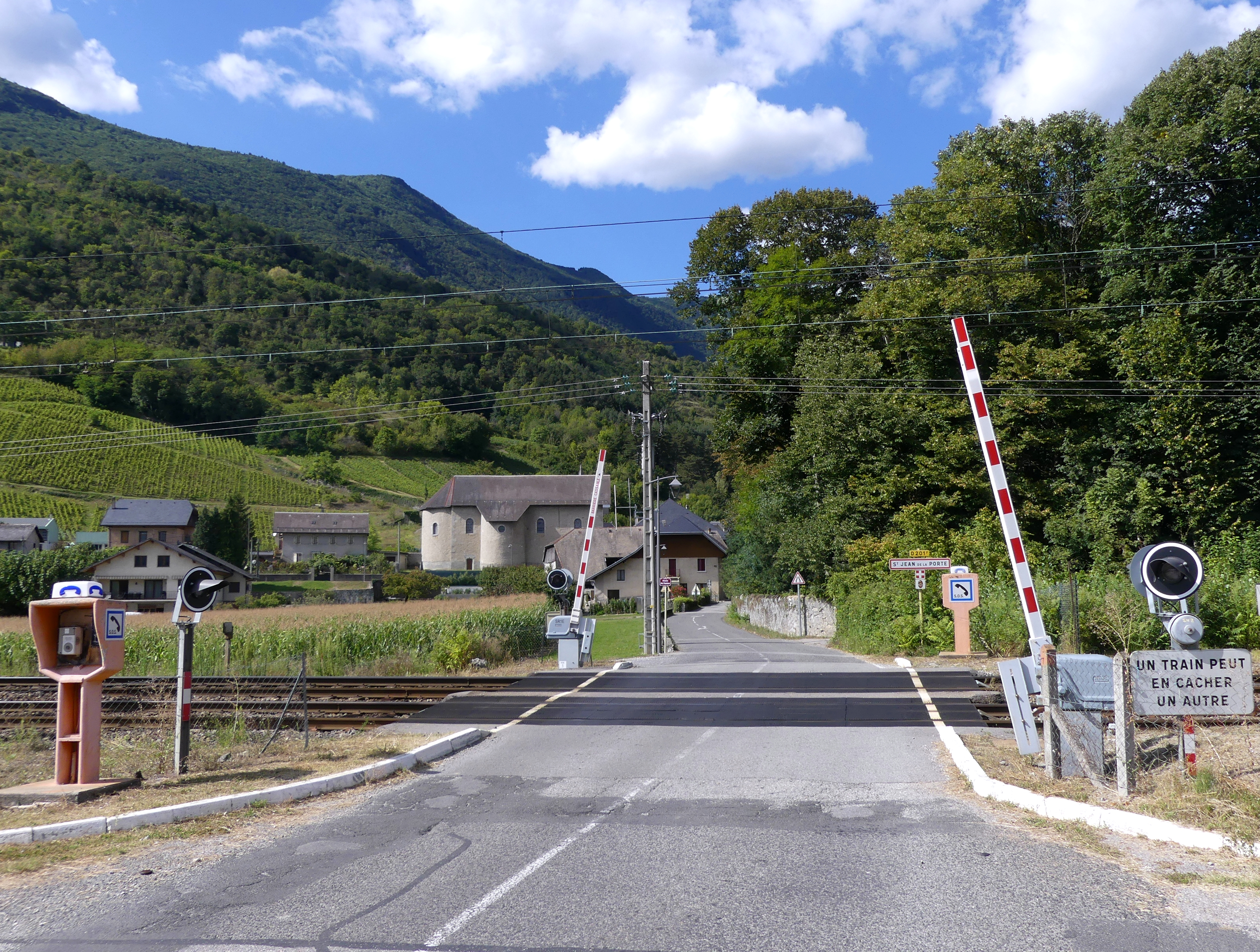
French level crossing

=== France ===
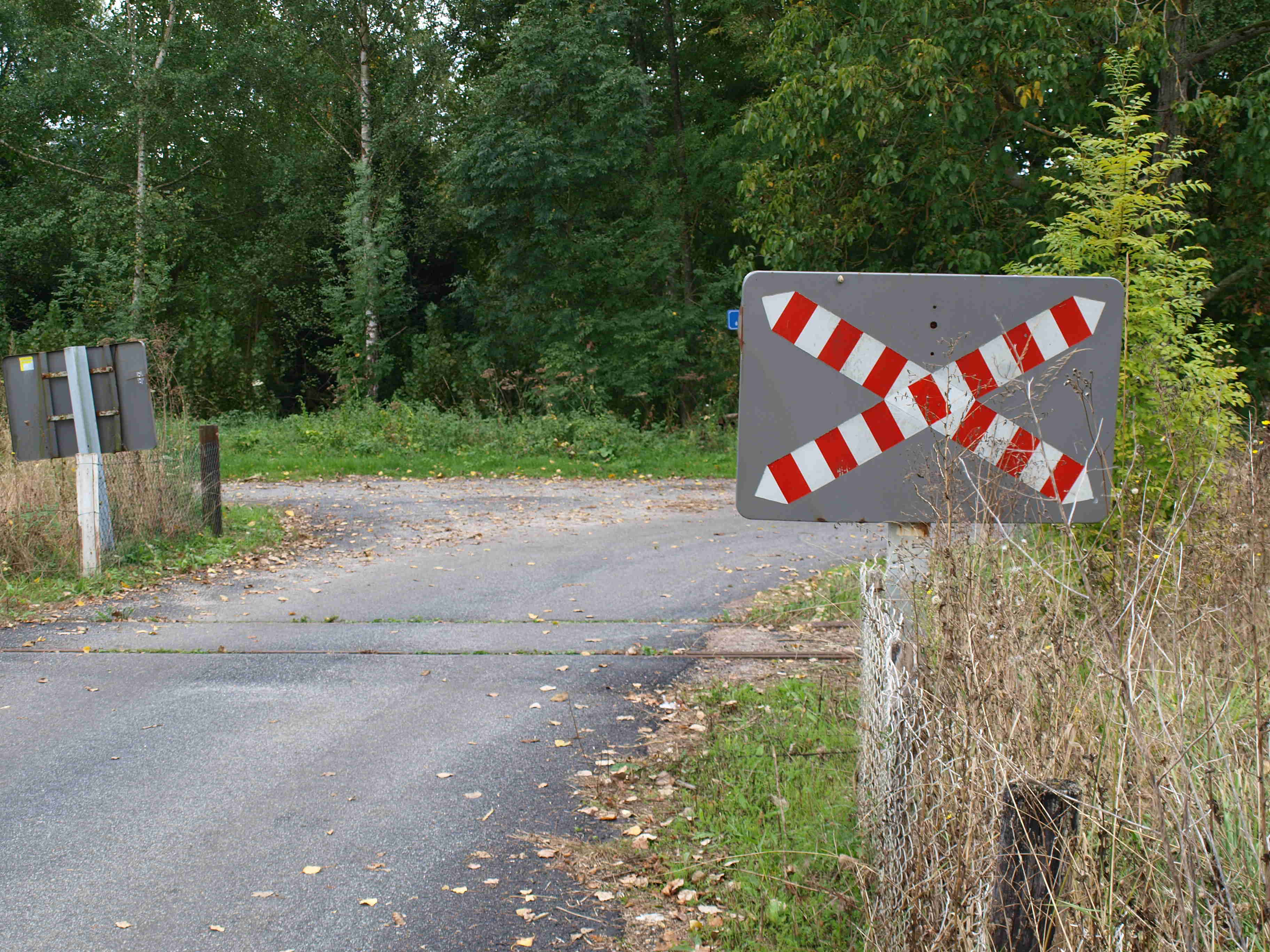
Unprotected right crossing in France, marked by a Saint Andrews cross

French level crossings usually have automatic half barriers, a single red light on a circle backboard, and bells (11,200 out of 15,300). When the crossing activates, the red light flashes, the bells ring, and the barriers come down. Due to a crash at Allinges in 2008, the law since 2017 allows adding an extra blinking red light when the first red light might not be visible. Some crossings have a sign saying "signal automatique" (automatic signal). French level crossings with more than one track have a sign saying "un train peut en cacher un autre" (a train can hide another train).

As of 2016 France has 15,459 level crossings (by comparison, there were 33,500 in 1938 and 25,000 in 1980). Of these, less than 0.4% are on national roads, 31.4% are on departmental roads and 68.2% are on town roads. The high-speed train lines are built with no level crossings, but high-speed trains are also used on conventional railway lines and exposed there to level crossing accidents.

100 crashes occurred at French level crossings in 2015, causing 26 fatalities. Most of these crashes are caused by misuse, e.g., trying to pass as the barriers are down or are closing, in violation of the French traffic code.

French crossbucks are white with red stripes that marks the ungated railroad crossing, can have a target board, which can be black or grey, depending on which type of the crossbuck fits with. Sometimes a stop sign is added below to indicate an ungated railroad crossing without barriers, which the drivers can pass the railroad crossing if no trains are approaching.

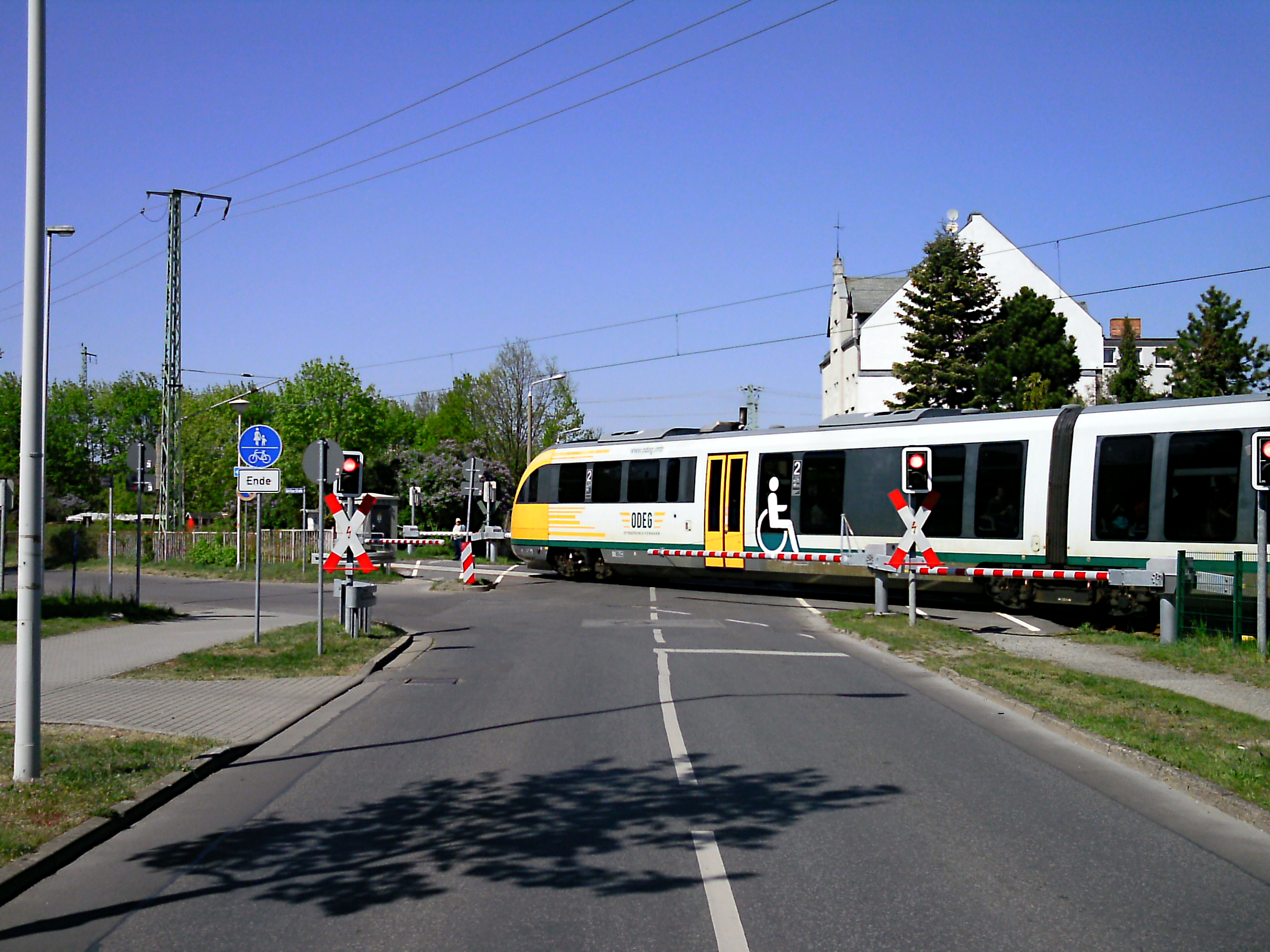
German level crossing

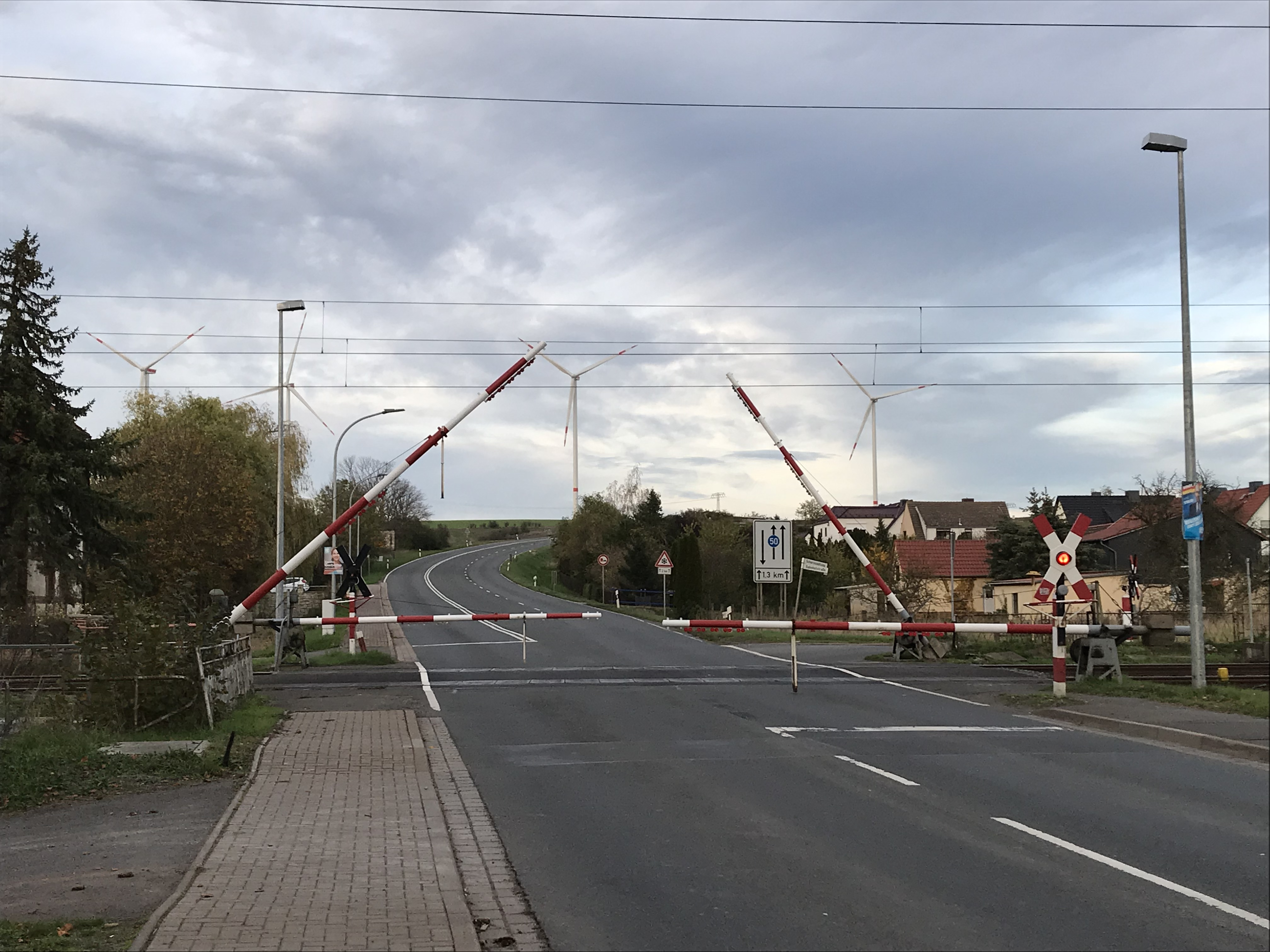
German level crossing with WSSB lights and mechanical gates

=== Greece ===
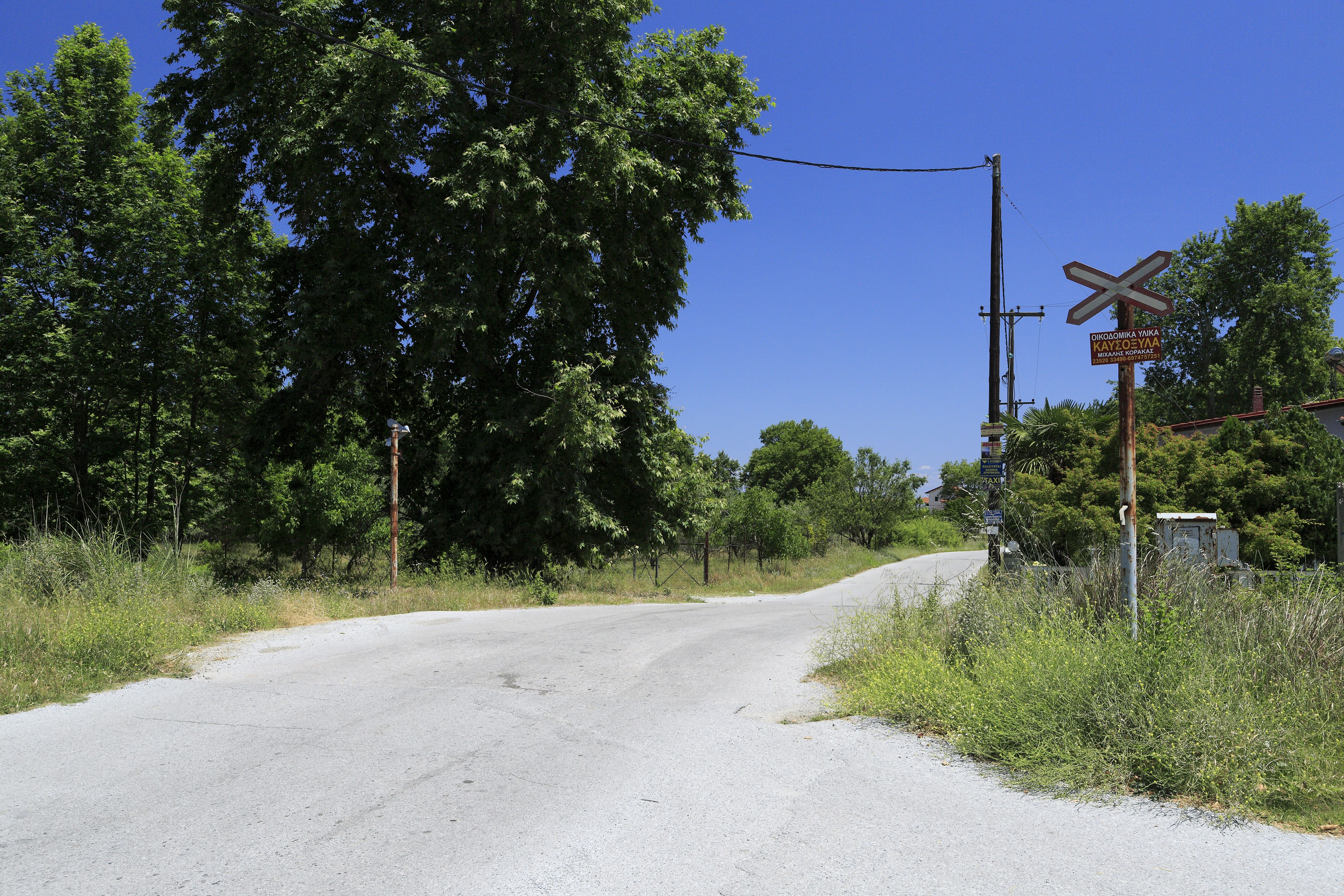
Unprotected Greek level crossing

Greek crossings use two red lights, bells, barriers, and crossbucks with a yellow background with a red border; if the crossing has more than one track, an additional chevron is added below, indicating that the crossing has two or more tracks. The gated crossings tend to follow United States practice and use American-made crossing warning equipment. Ungated level crossings use crossbucks with stop signs added below, and can have signals if automatic. Crossings that are not automatic mostly have crossbucks with stop signs added below to indicate an ungated railroad crossing.

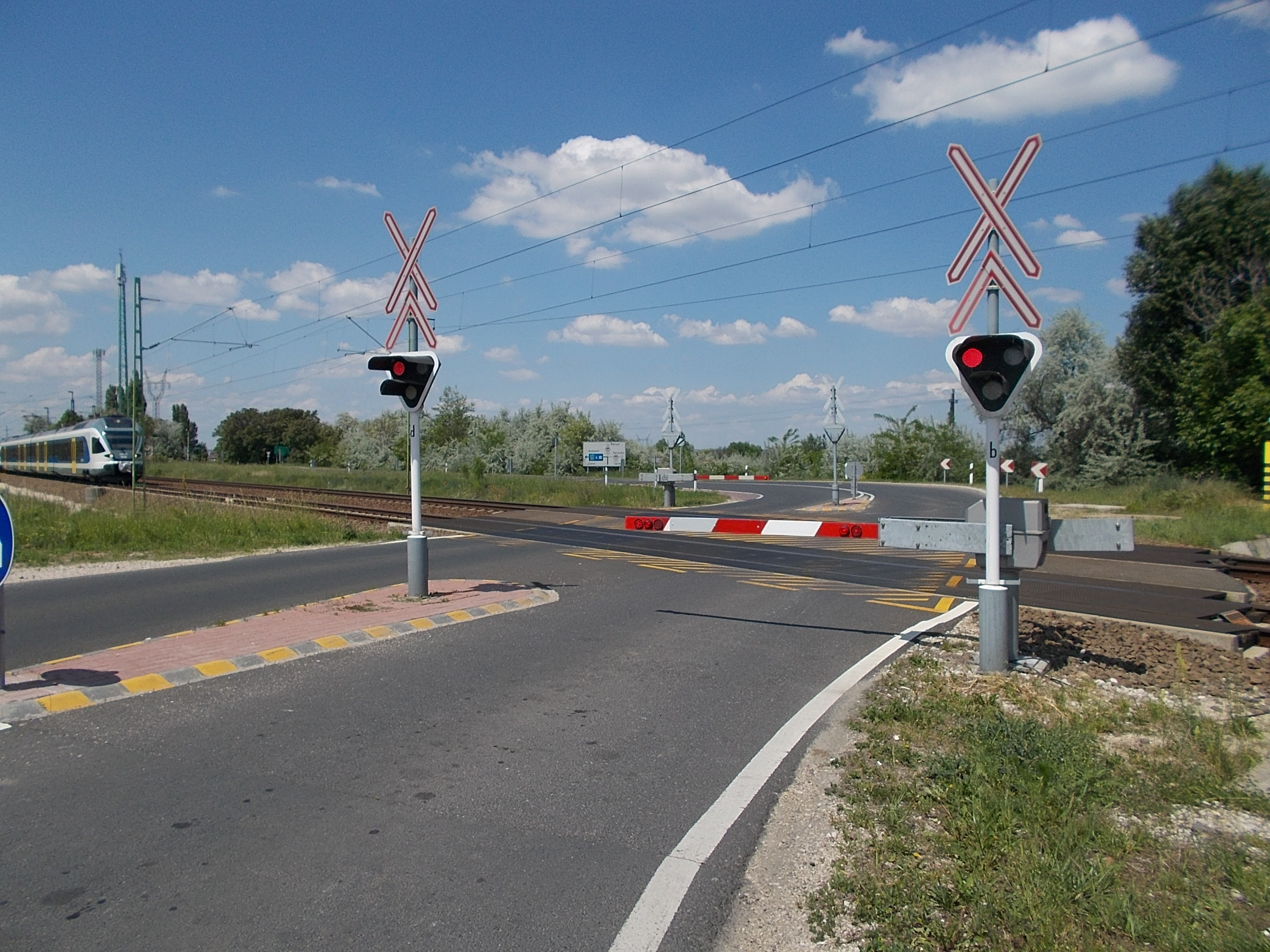
Hungarian level crossing

=== Hungary ===
The Hungarian crossbuck is a white cutout sign with a red border, similar to the Czech crossbuck. It features an additional chevron if more than one tracks are present in one crossing. The crossbuck is usually oriented vertically, but horizontal ones can be found as well. Their orientation carries no meaning. The automatic lights are similar in shape to the Finnish ones, in that they have a single white light that flashes when the crossing is idling and two red lights that flash when is activated. They do not feature alarms, thus they make no sound when activated. They can be equipped with half-length barriers, or sometimes double half-length barriers to block the whole roadway; in the latter case the lowering of the additional barriers is delayed, to avoid closing vehicles into the crossing. A stop sign may be placed on the pole of the crossbuck (if automatic lights are present it is placed under them), indicating that the driver must stop at the crossing unconditionally, even if an idle signal is present, before proceeding.

In Hungary the white flashing light is called an idle signal, it means that the device is in working order, and the drivers may cross the railway without stopping if they deem it safe, yet should they still do so with caution. A dark device means the system is faulty, and drivers should stop at the crossing to make sure there is no train coming by. If the system detects a fault while the barriers are closed, it will lift them up slowly, and stop them at a slight angle instead of vertical, to make the fault stance unambiguous.

Old mechanical full length barriers can still be found in some places. They can have an additional bell, a pair of red lights, or both to alert drivers of the barrier being lowered. They do not feature a white idle signal, as they are operated manually. These are legacy solutions which are planned to be phased out.

=== Norway ===
In Norway, level crossings have crossbucks colored in a white background with a red border, with similar lights to the German crossings, although the white light flash when the crossing is clear, instead of a yellow warning light, and the red light flashes, as do the lights on the barriers. The white light shines when the crossing is clear. The bells uses the same sound as the Swedish level crossings.

From 1998 to 2008 the Norwegian National Rail Administration (Jernbaneverket) removed about 1000 level crossings, leaving about 3500 still in use. 160 km/h (99 mph) is the maximum speed for trains over level crossings. In addition, Oslo's and Bergen's tram or light rail systems have some level crossings. Most lines on the Oslo Metro (T-banen) are free of them. Most of the level crossings were removed from the old suburban railways in the western parts of the city, when the lines were upgraded to metro standard, but some crossings are retained on the Holmenkollen Line.

=== Sweden ===
Sweden

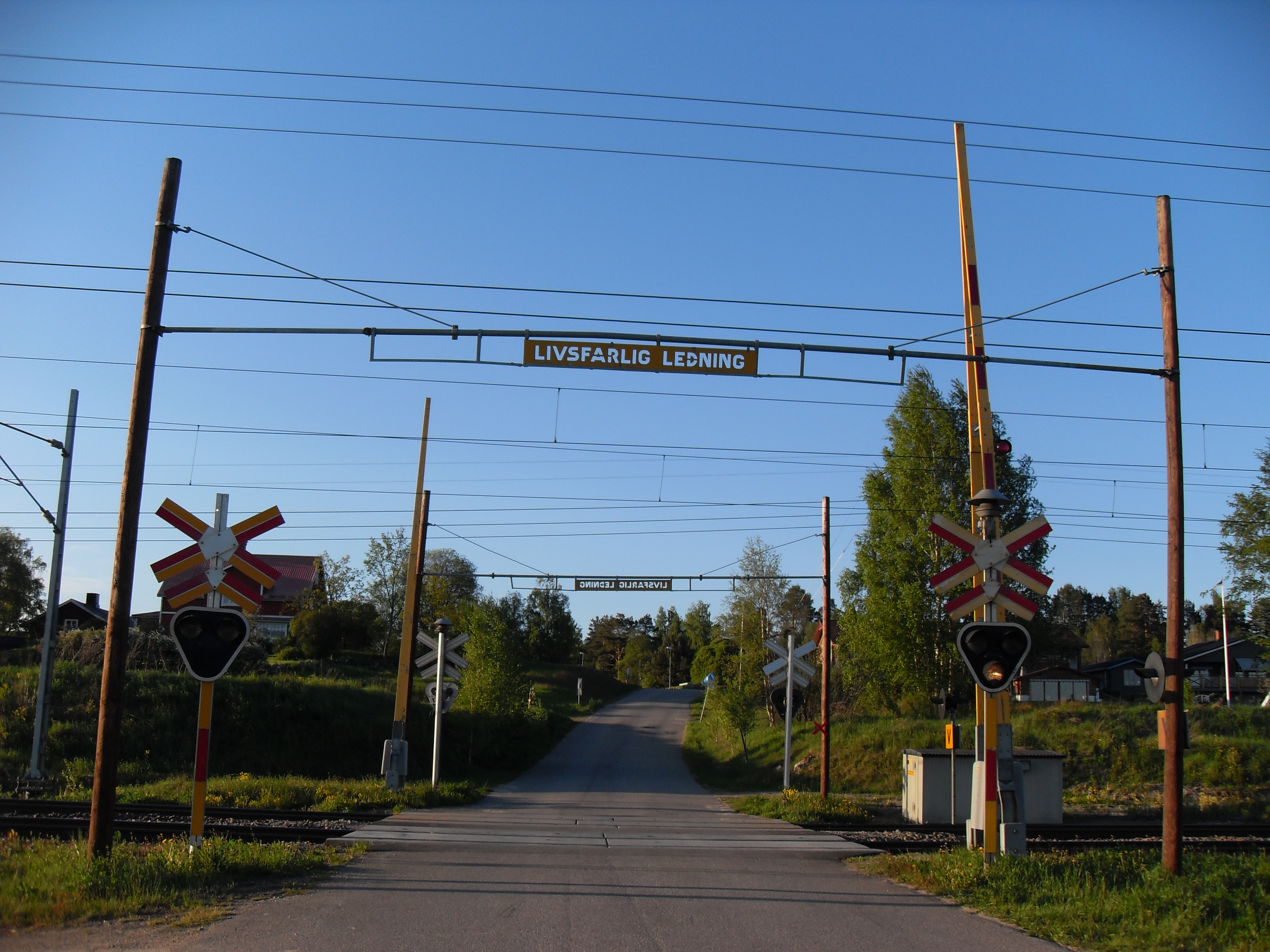
A railroad crossing in Ljusdal, Sweden

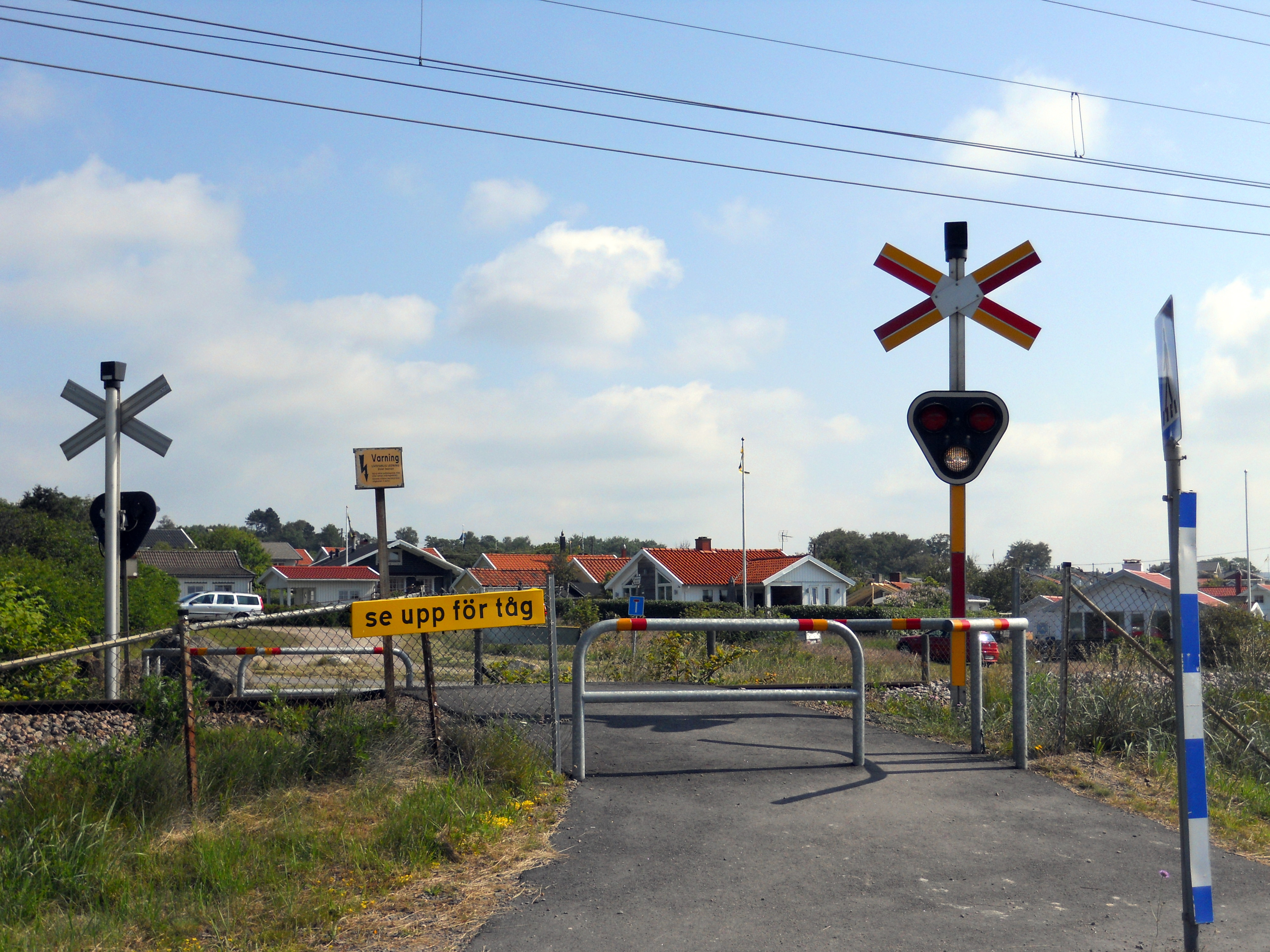
A pedestrian railroad crossing in Apelviken, Sweden

In Sweden there are 8,500 level crossings, according to Trafikverket, the Swedish Transport Administration (formerly Banverket, the Swedish Rail Administration). On public roads they have light signals with or without gates. On private roads there are level crossings without signals. Most accidents occur on crossings without gates. For many years there have been activities to reduce the number of accidents, usually by adding gates, or adding light signals if there were none. On the main lines many bridges have been built, and also anywhere a new road or new railway has been built. Still there are some level crossings left on the main lines. A train speed of 200 km/h is allowed in Sweden over level crossings, if there are gates and an obstacle detection unit. This unit detects cars on the track and prevents the gates from closing fully and stops the train. According to Trafikverket, in 15 years there has only been one serious collision between a car and a train on such a level crossing, when a car ran through the gates just in front of the train. Level crossings on electrified lines have a wide sign above the roadway at the barrier line saying "livsfarlig ledning" (dangerous conduit). Some also have a sign saying "se upp för tåg" (beware of trains).

=== Turkey ===
Level crossings in Turkey have two red lights, alarms, barriers and, at most crossings, a large red light with the text displaying DUR (stop), which remains lit until trains have cleared the crossing. At the top of the signals, there is a white cross with letters saying Demiryolu Geçidi (railroad crossing). Additionally, each level crossing has a white sign under the signals with the red text on it that says Kırmızı ışıkta DUR (please stop at the red light), which reminds all pedestrians and drivers to stop when the red lights are lit.

=== United Kingdom ===
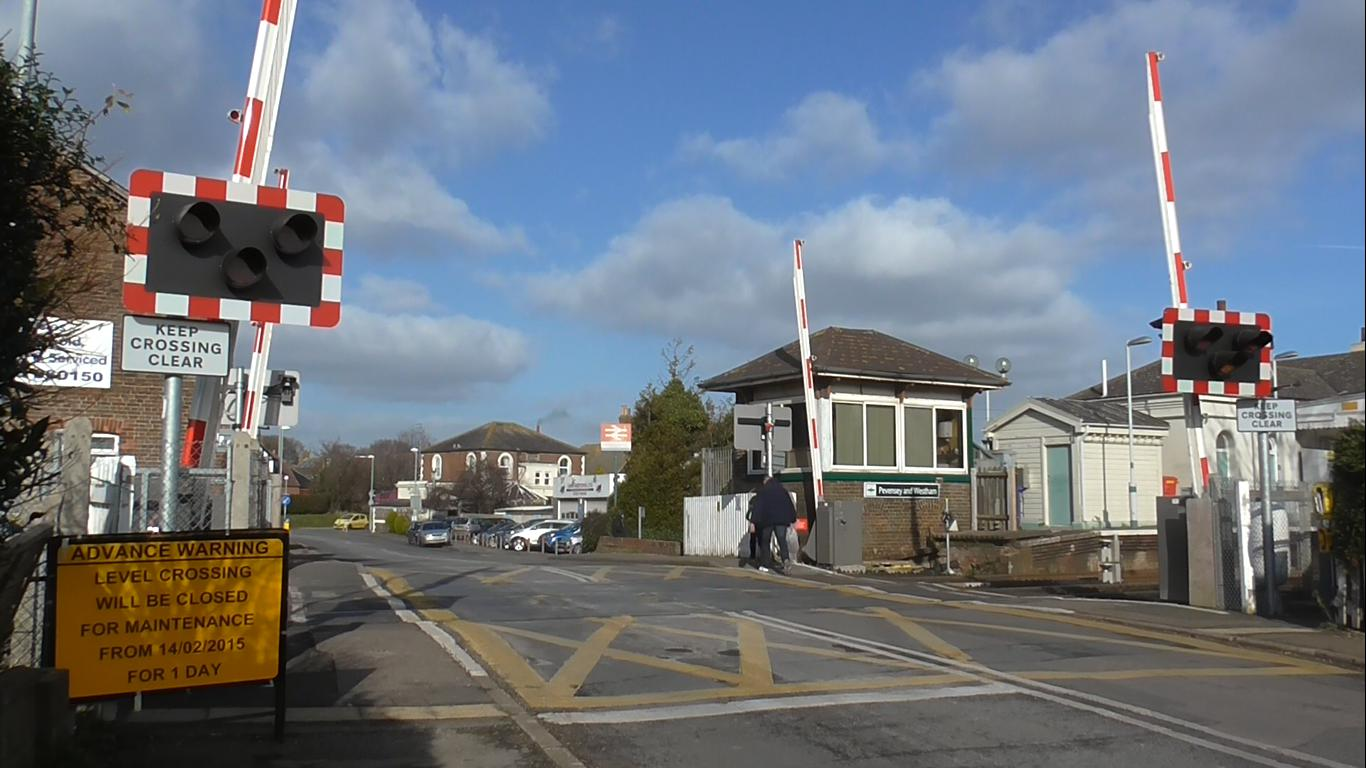
A level crossing with obstacle detection systems at Pevensey & Westham, East Sussex, England

Level crossings in the United Kingdom started out as crossings with gates opened manually by a signalman. These were standard all across the network until mechanised barriers started to be introduced. These were either automatic or operated by a signalman adjacent to the crossing. After the major Hixon rail crash in 1968, the design of level crossings started to change, and all mechanised crossings had to have a preliminary amber light fitted. The UK is one of only a few countries with this design of crossing. More recent advances in technology have led to more technical automatic crossings, safer open crossings, and crossings with obstacle detection systems to detect stray people or vehicles on the crossing. In 2020 there were around 5,800 level crossings on the mainline railway system, and a further 1,500 on heritage and minor railway lines. The number on the mainlines is being slowly reduced as diversions and bridges are implemented. Most UK level crossings are footpath and user-worked crossings, and 1 in 5 are on public highways. The majority of these are manually controlled and monitored from either the adjacent signal-box or another box using CCTV.

There are many different types of crossings. Crossings which are automatic and independent from the signalling system (like most standard crossings internationally) have half-barriers. Level crossings were the location of 55 collisions between trains and road vehicles between 2011 and 2019.

The nearly 7,500 level crossings in the United Kingdom can be broadly classified into two types:

- protected crossings, with warning lights and gates or barriers which prevent crossing when a train is nearby;
- unprotected crossings: footpaths, bridleways and user-worked crossings (where the responsibility for ensuring a safe crossing lies on the user).

Network Rail, responsible for maintaining most of the crossings, is taking steps to reduce safety risks, for example by closing crossings where possible. There are still old wooden manual gates in use on regular and heritage railways.

== North and Central America ==
=== Canada ===
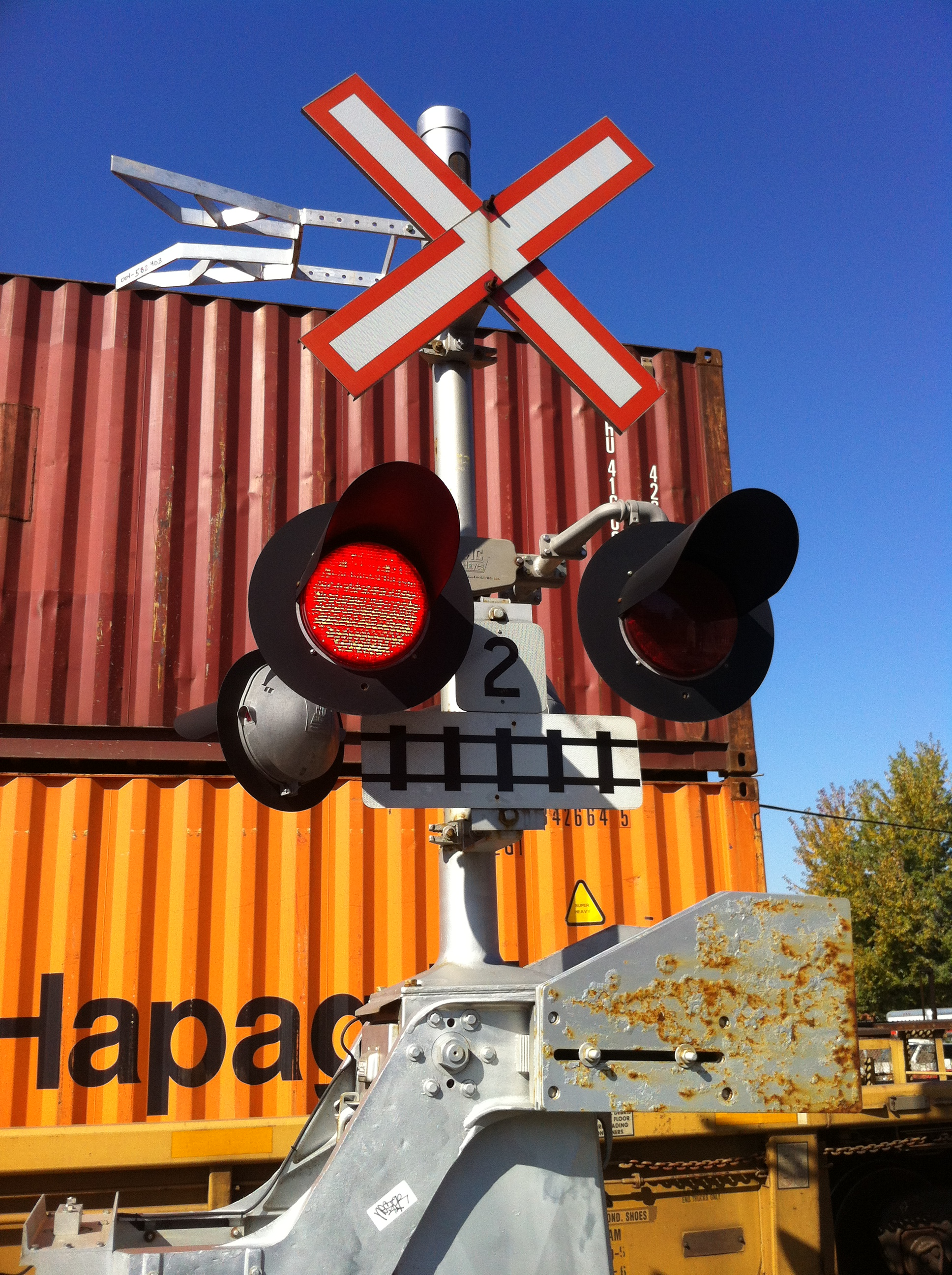
Railway crossing in Montreal, Quebec, Canada

Public railway crossings in Canada are required by law to be marked by a crossbuck, along with alternating flashing red lights and gate arms on high-traffic roads. Crossbuck signs are white with a red outline and, if the situation warrants, contain a supplemental sign to indicate the number of tracks. Private roads in Canada that cross tracks are marked with either a crossbuck or a stop sign. A large number of public Canadian Pacific Railway level crossings in Ontario do not have a crossing arm but still utilize the crossbuck and alternating flashing lights. The advance-warning sign is a yellow diamond shape with a diagram of a track crossing a straight segment of road (similar to a crossroads sign, except that the horizontal road is replaced by a track). Before changes in regulations mandated bilingual (English and French) or wordless signs, either "railway crossing" or "traverse de chemin de fer" was written on each crossbuck. Lights, gates, and bells are identical to their American counterparts.

There are 22,884 public railroad crossings in Canada in 2018, according to the UNECE.

=== United States ===
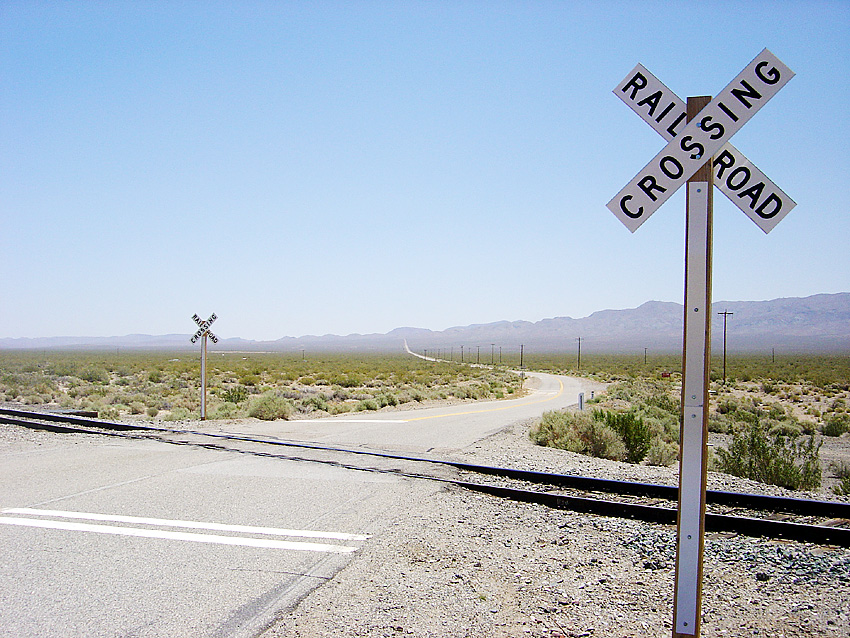
The words "Railroad Crossing" normally appear on the crossbuck sign in the US. The road appears to make a turn so that it crosses the railroad at an angle closer to 90 degrees

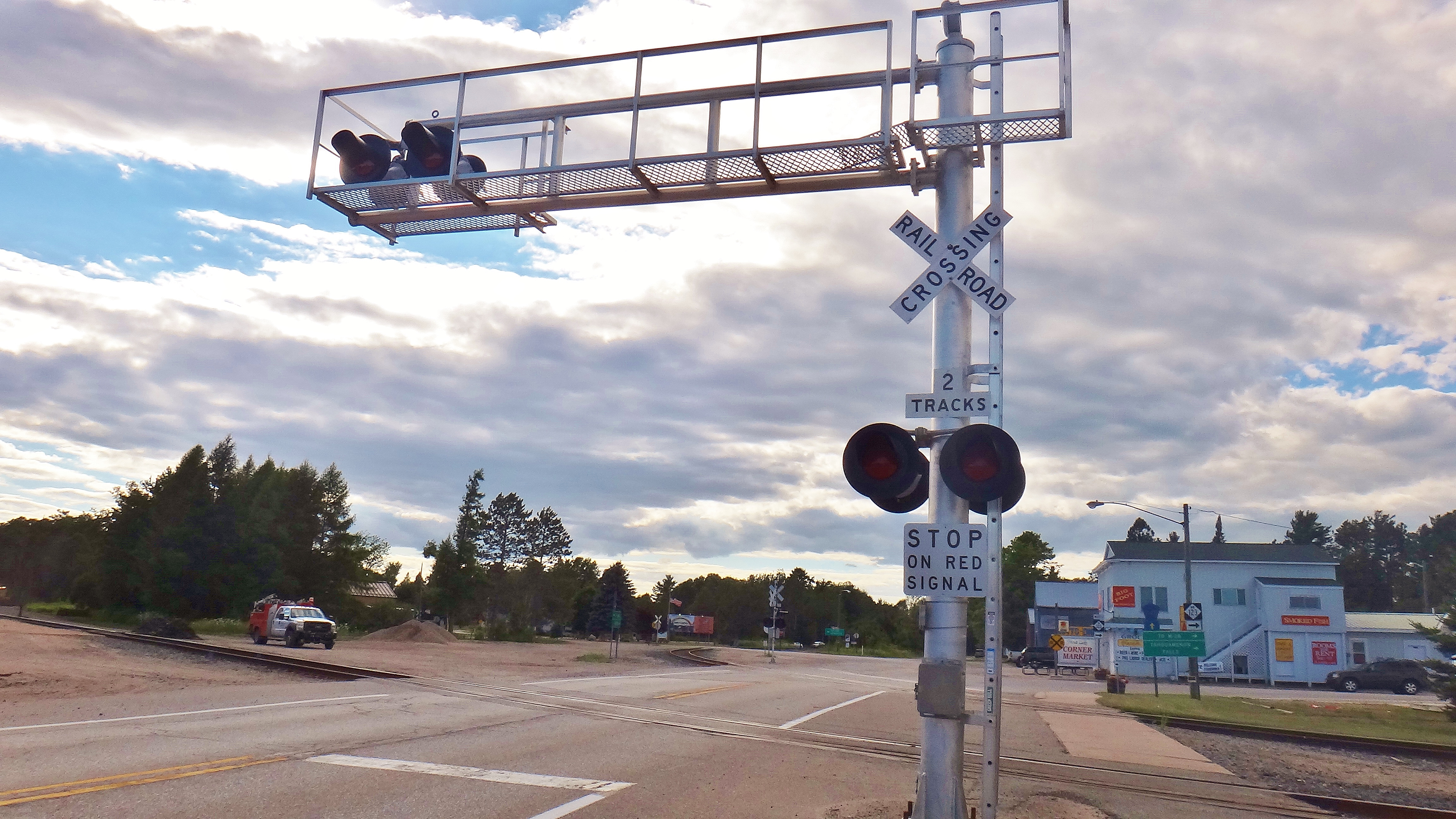
Railroad crossing with a cantilever signal in Trout Lake, Michigan

The first US patent for manual/electrical crossing gates was awarded on 27 August 1867, to J. Nason and J. F. Wilson, both of Boston.

There were 209,765 level crossings in the US in 2018, according to the UNECE.

==== Crossing identification ====
Every crossing, whether above grade, below grade, or at grade, is required to be assigned a unique identifier which is a six-digit number with a trailing letter used as a checksum. This identifier is called a Grade Crossing Number, and is usually posted with a sign or sticker on the sign or equipment. This allows the exact location of a crossing anywhere in the United States to be identified in the event of an incident involving that crossing.

==== Traffic control devices ====
All public crossings in the United States are required to be marked by at least a crossbuck. The 2009 Manual on Uniform Traffic Control Devices requires passive crossings (crossings without actuated flashing lights or gates) to have either stop signs or yield signs in addition to the crossbuck, unless a flagger will stop traffic every time a train approaches. Normally a yield sign is used, unless it is determined that all vehicles should stop at the crossing, such as a location with poor sight distance.

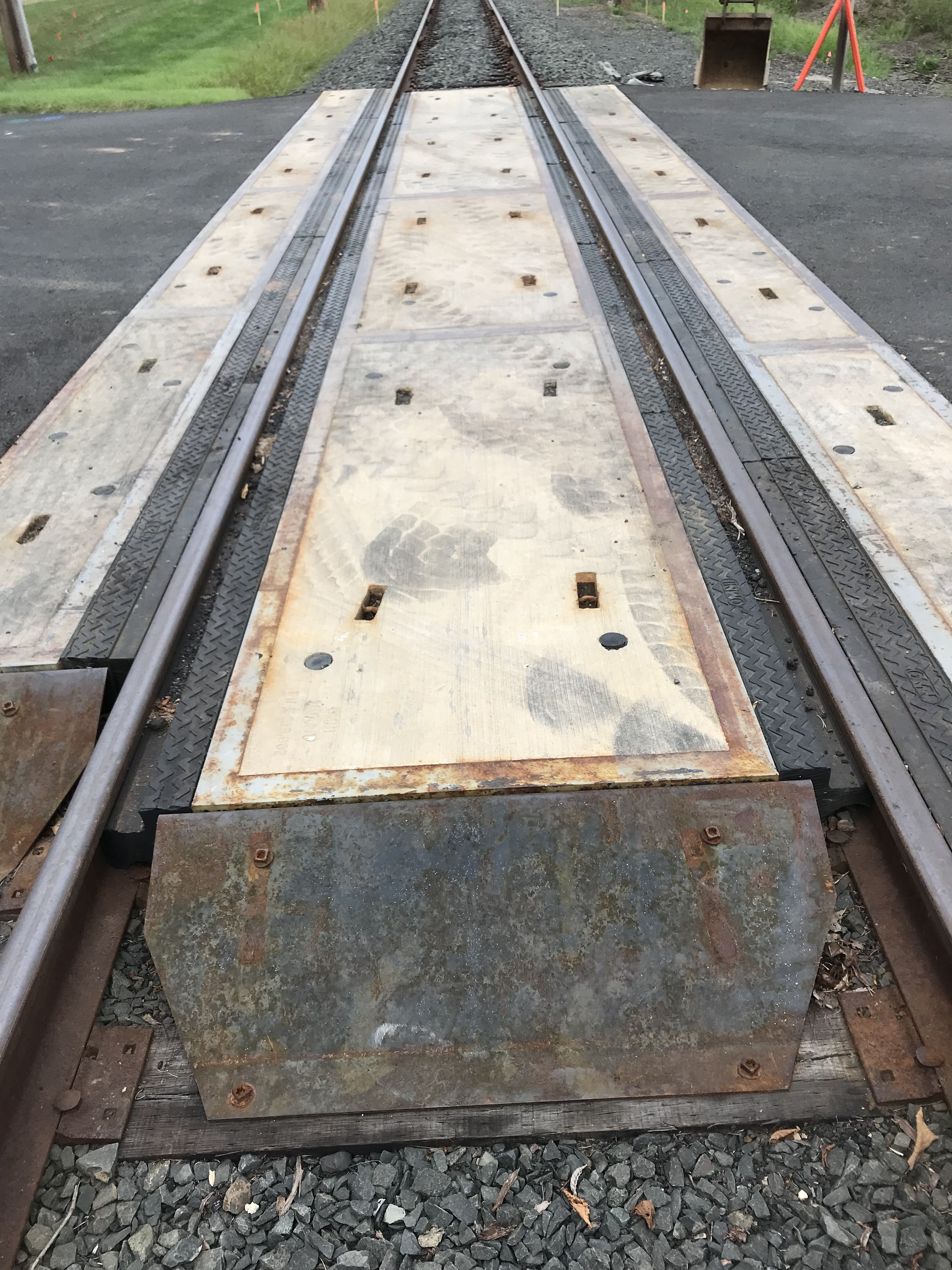
Many modern grade crossings in the US are made with concrete, along with rubber next to the rails. This example is in Bloomfield, Connecticut

If two or more tracks are found at a crossing, a sign denoting the number of tracks is required only if a crossing has no gates. This sign is optional at crossings with a gate.

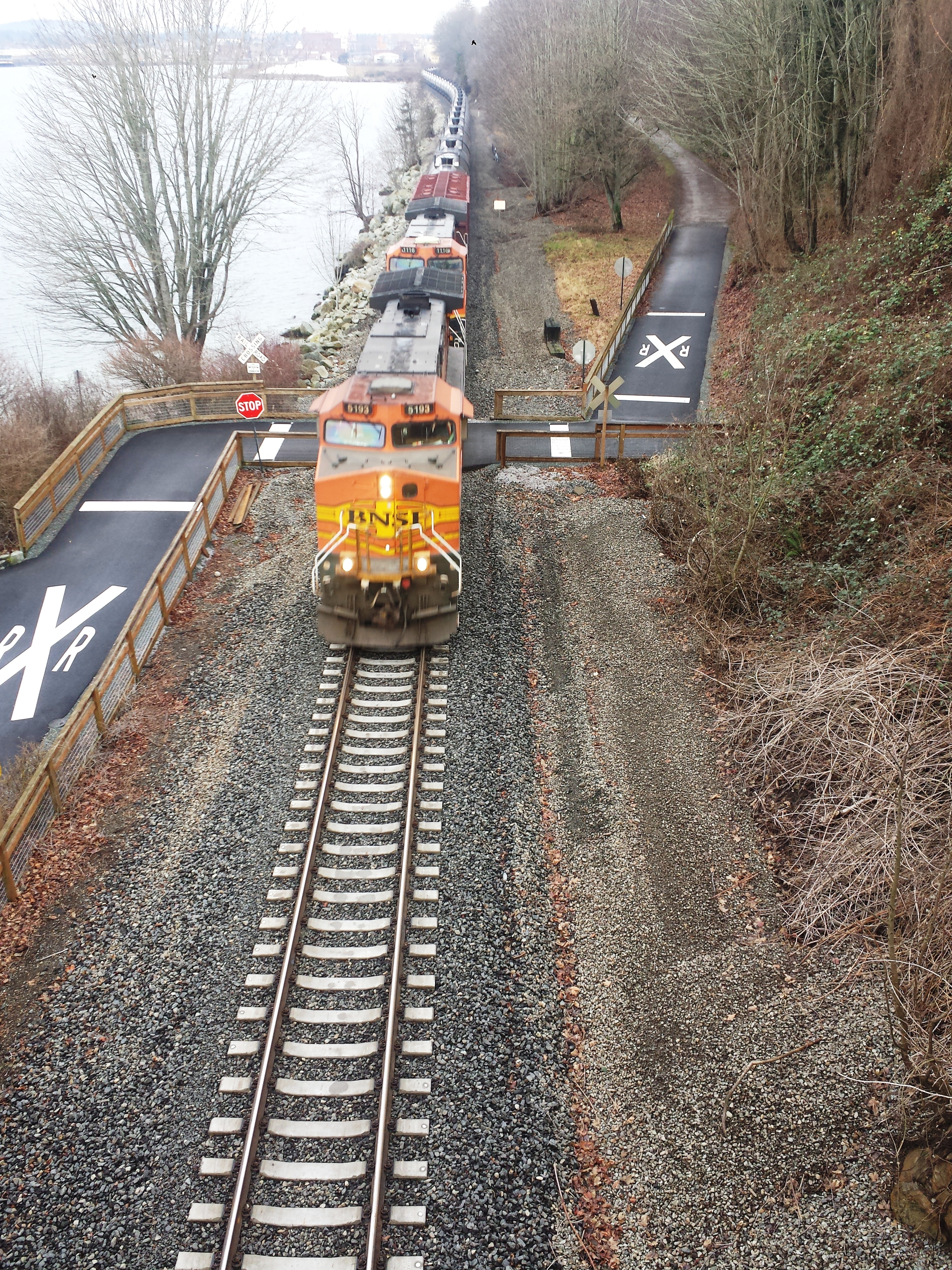
Channelized pedestrian-bicycle crossing in Bellingham, Washington

A few level crossings still use wigwag signals, which were developed in the early 1900s by the Pacific Electric Railway interurban system in the Los Angeles region to protect its many level crossings. Though now considered to be antiques, in 2020 there were 33 wigwags in active use. By law, these signals must be replaced by the now-standard alternating red lights when they are retired..

United States Federal Railroad Administration regulations restrict trains to a maximum speed of 110 mph (177 km/h) at standard grade crossings. Crossings are permitted up to 125 mph (201 km/h) only if an "impenetrable barrier" is in place to block traffic when a train approaches. Crossings are prohibited at speeds in excess of 125 mph (201 km/h).

An experimental level crossing barrier was tested in Michigan and was intended to reduce drivers attempting to drive around lowered crossing gates. The devices are called delineators, consisting of a series of flexible bollards that rise vertically out of vertical tubes in the pavement when the crossing signal is activated. The delineators are designed so that they will not be broken and will not damage vehicles if they are hit, allowing vehicles to exit the level crossing if they are already within it when the gates are activated. The test period for the new barrier began on 5 December 2007, and ran for at least 17 months.

==== Locomotive equipment ====
In the United States and in countries following United States practices, a locomotive must have a bright headlight and ditch lights (two lights located below the headlight but above the pilot), a working bell, and a whistle or horn that must be sounded four times (long-long-short-long), similar to the signal for the International Morse Code letter "Q", as the train approaches the crossing. Oscillating lights such as Mars Lights as well as strobe beacons have also been used in the past to increase train visibility at level crossings, but both have mostly been replaced by the simpler ditch lights.

==== Quiet zones ====
In the interest of noise abatement, some U.S. cities have passed laws prohibiting the sounding of bells and whistles. In December 2003, the Federal Railroad Administration published regulations that would create areas where train horns could be silenced, provided that certain safety measures were put in place, such as 4-quadrant gates and concrete barriers to prevent drivers from circumventing the gates or automatic whistles (also called wayside horns) mounted at the crossing. (Note: Wayside horns are sets of speakers that are mounted on a pole and directed at the crossing, which reduces noise pollution to nearby neighborhoods) Trains would still sound their horns upon spotting a hazard, such as a pedestrian crossing in the path of the train. Implementation of the new "Quiet Zone" Final Rule was delayed repeatedly, but was finally implemented in the summer of 2005. Rail "Quiet Zone" crossings still require bells as part of the AWDs, in addition to the wayside horns.

A Partial Quiet Zone is a rail segment on which Quiet Zone rules are in effect from 10 p.m. to 7 a.m., but train horns sound routinely during the day.

== Asia ==
=== China ===
Chinese crossings have two red lights and at most crossings, a white light that remains lit when the crossing is clear. Level crossings in China use alarms rather than bells.

Speed up campaigns have largely eliminated many crossings on heavily used trunk main lines though some still do exist. Most at-grade crossings in China are for smaller industrial spur and access lines which may or may not have crossing gates.

=== Hong Kong ===
Since the KCR East Rail was modernised, there are no longer any public level crossings on the heavy rail network in Hong Kong. However, level crossings continue to exist on the Light Rail network, and one such level crossing was the site of a level crossing accident in 1994.

=== India ===
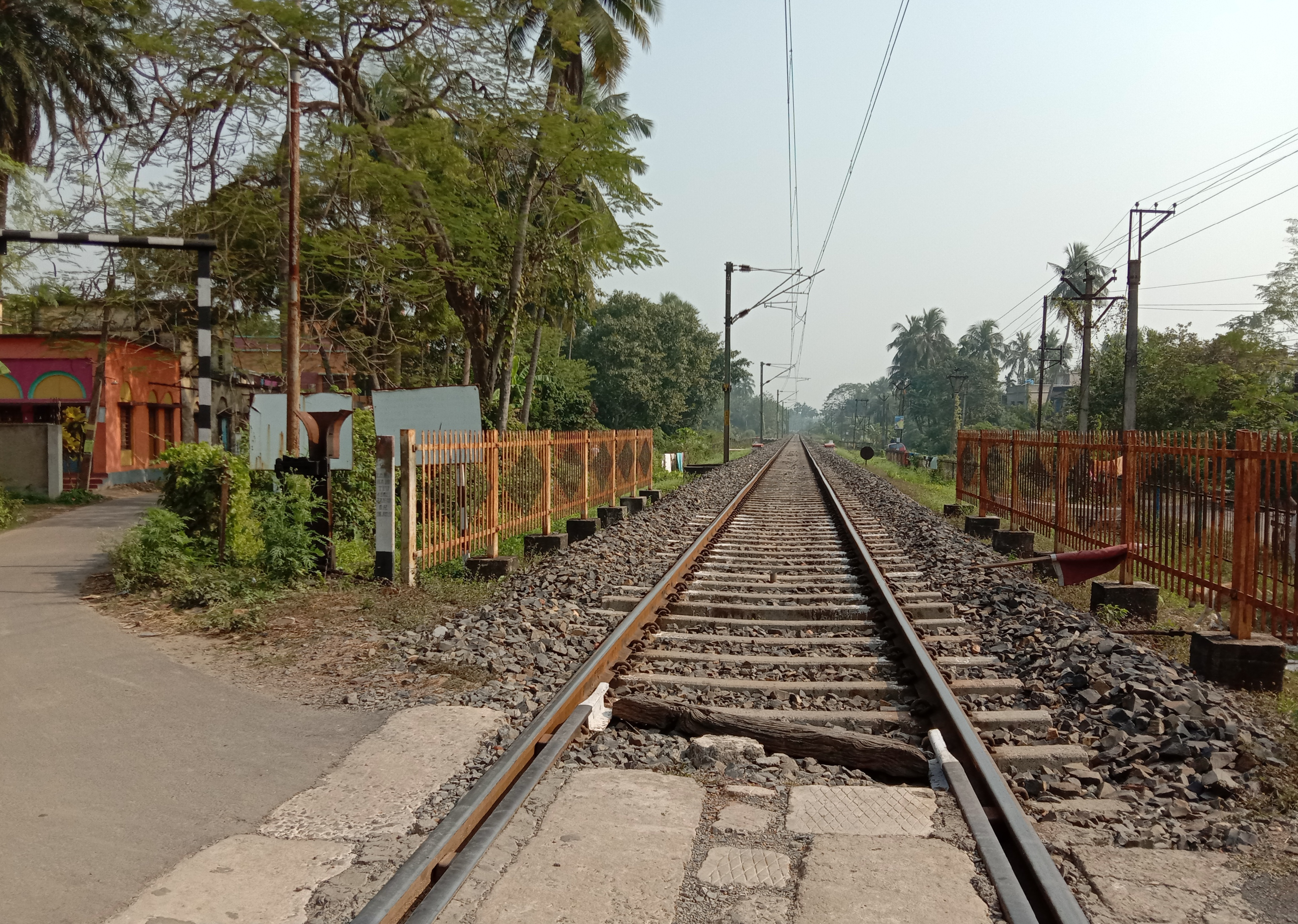
Level crossing of Santragachi–Amta branch line in Domjur, West Bengal

Most level crossings in India are manually operated. Signals and barriers are installed at all crossings while manual crossings are additionally required to have the hand red and green signal lamps. Level crossing barriers have yellow and black arms with a bilingual stop sign placed in the middle. Indian Railways aims at elimination of all unmanned crossings and replacing them with manned crossings.

=== Indonesia ===
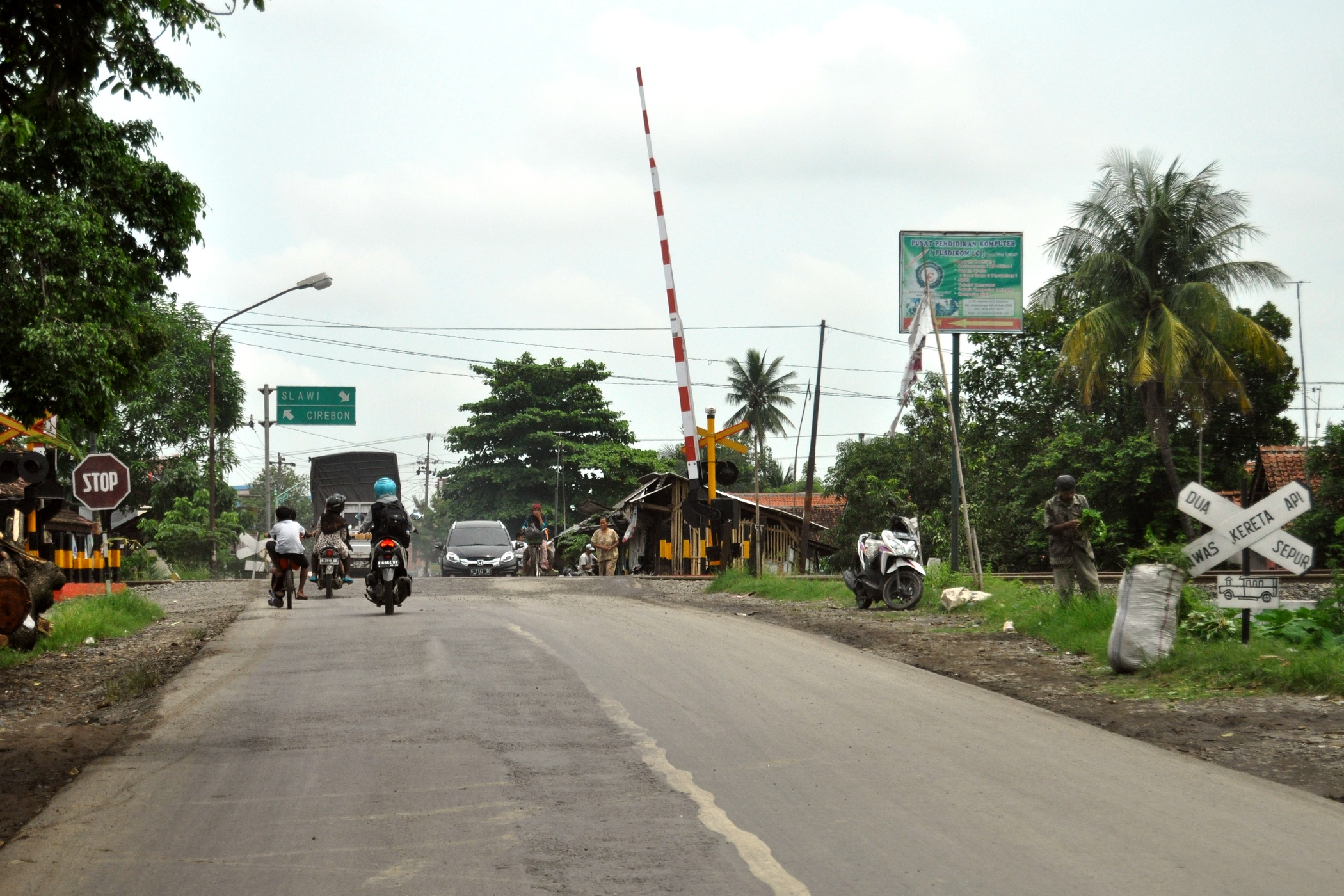
A railway crossing (level crossing) in Brebes, Central Java

Most level crossings in Indonesia have sirens. They also have two red lights and full barriers in red and white. Level crossings in Indonesia are not all officially operated by the Kereta Api Indonesia railway company; some crossings (usually in rural or village areas) are guarded by civilian volunteers and are usually guarded 24 hours. Crossings in cities and urban areas are fully operated by the railway company. Usually each level crossing has a small guard room to control the traffic and barriers at the crossing. Official crossings are marked by sirens and red-white (Indonesian flag–like) barriers.

Level crossings in Indonesia tend to be congested by traffic, thus are not automatic like in Western countries, so level crossing watchmen are usually posted at every crossing; these are employees from the railway company. However, Indonesia plans to replace these crossings with automated crossings or overpasses in the aftermath of the 2013 Bintaro crash. The Ministry of Transportation bought 11 automated crossing barriers in 2015.

At Yogyakarta station, there are still "rolling gates" in use but only opened for bikes and pedestrians.

Prior to 2013, there were few major accidents in crossings. On 9 December 2013, a Kereta Commuter Indonesia commuter train hit a Pertamina fuel truck stuck in Bintaro crossing (now replaced with a flyover), killing drivers (masinis) and passengers in the front car. On 6 December 2015, a MetroMini bus was hit by a commuter train in front of Angke station, killing only 18 bus passengers. On 6 April 2018, a Sancaka train bound for Surabaya hit a container truck near Walikukun Station, Ngawi, killing the train driver. On 26 July 2022, a Merak local train bound for Rangkasbitung hit an "odong-odong" in Serang, killing passengers and children in the front car.

Due to the high death toll of train-versus-car accidents and severe traffic-jam impact, both local and national governments have started to remove level crossings, especially in Jakarta. Sometimes crossings are closed due to increase of headway, like the Jatinegara-Bekasi track revisions that left only three out of seven crossings open. Numerous underpasses and flyovers have been created, and later the nearby roads are closed; for example, the replacement of the 2013 crash site in Bintaro, South Jakarta with a flyover. Crossings on national roads are permanently closed due to high traffic; for example, the Klonengan crossing in Brebes, located in the main access to Purwokerto city.

Java in particular had large sugar cane narrow gauge networks, with very little or no security. There are still some networks in use, especially at Jatiroto and Semboro Sugar mill, with primitive barriers, almost no lights, no bells, and no warning signs.

=== Israel ===
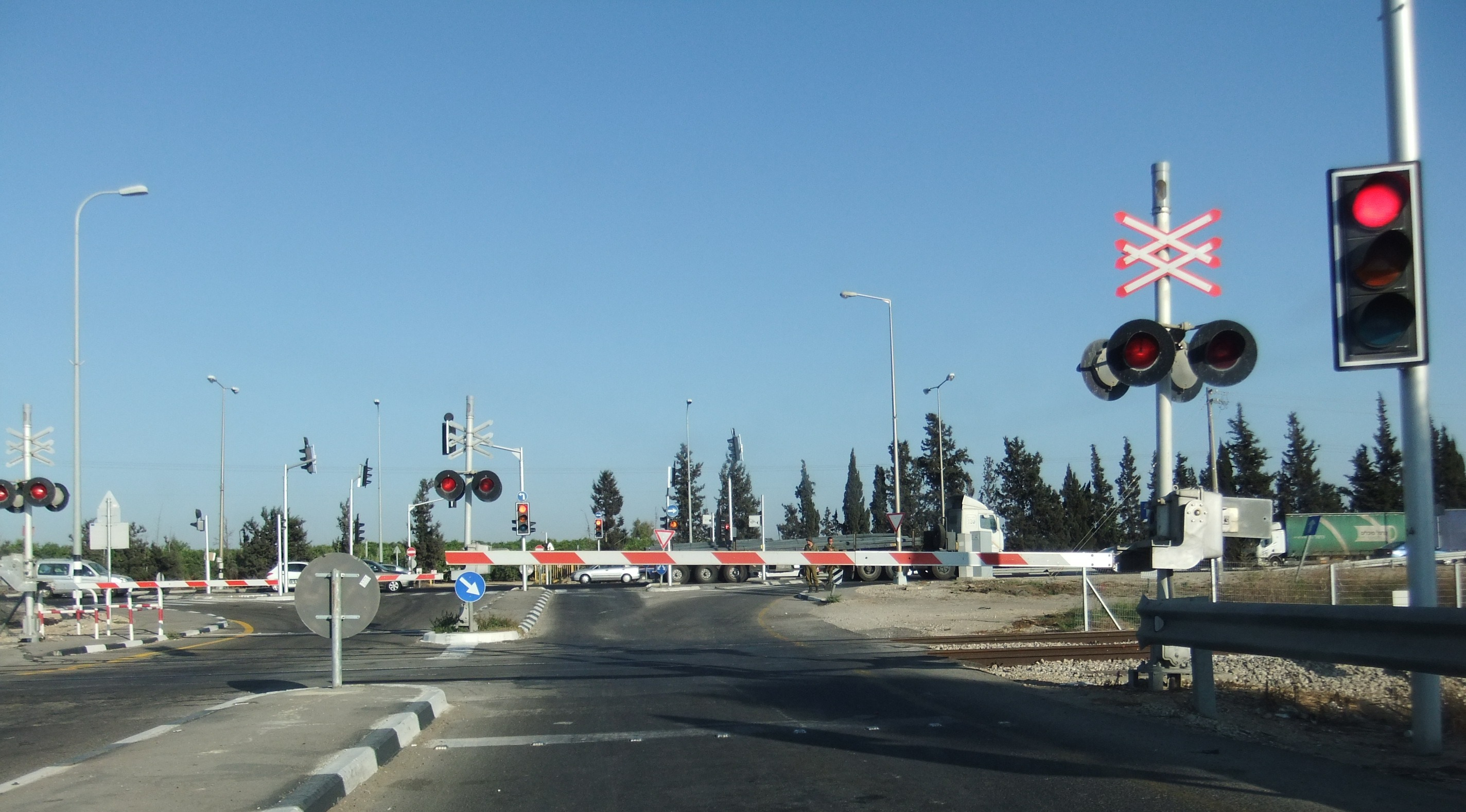
Israeli level crossing

Israel generally follows United States practices, and much of the Israel Railways network employs American-made crossing warning equipment. The crossbucks are used similarly to the Russian crossbucks. Most level crossings also have crossbucks with stop signs and railroad crossing warning signs with an additional plate below with two side arrows that indicates which directions of trains were approaching.

In 2017, Israel Railways reported a 22% increase in the incidents of the barrier smashing during the summer months.

=== Japan ===
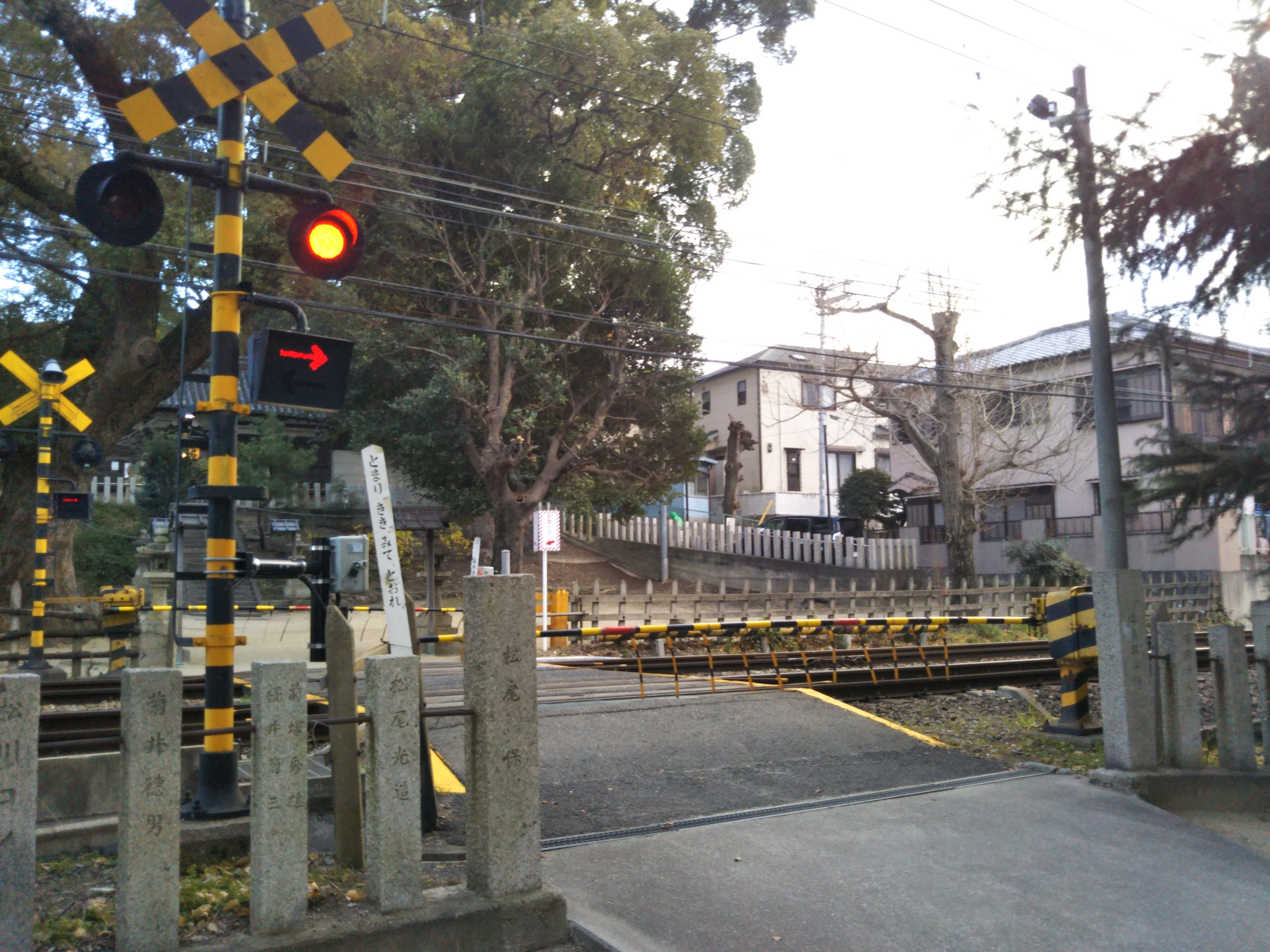
Japanese railway crossing

According to the Ministry of Land, Infrastructure, Transport and Tourism, there are in total about 33,300 level crossings (踏切, fumikiri) in Japan as of 2016. These are easily identifiable with their yellow and black crossbucks mounted adjacent to the crossing, and newer crossings are often paved in green asphalt for easy recognition. Most of these are protected with electronic signals (踏切警報機, fumikiri keihouki) usually equipped with alternating flashing red lights and yellow-and-black-striped barriers. Many signals are also equipped with signs with red LED arrows that indicate the direction in which approaching trains are moving. Both arrows are lit if there is a train approaching from each side.

Similarly to tanker trucks and buses in the United States, but unlike many other countries, all cars and bicycles must stop before proceeding over any level crossing in Japan, regardless of whether there are electronic signals, as required by the Road Traffic Act. The only exception is if the crossing is additionally controlled by a traffic light, called a fumikiri shingo (踏切信号); in this case, if the light is green, it is not necessary to stop at the level crossing.

On some busy rail lines, especially in urban areas like in Tokyo, Osaka and Nagoya, so many trains pass through some level crossings that they are almost always closed to vehicular traffic. In some cases, such as the Chūō Main Line, more than 50 trains pass in an hour, which equates to only two minutes in which vehicles can cross the tracks during that interval, causing serious traffic congestion and inconvenience. Many such crossings, known in Japanese as akazu no fumikiri (開かずの踏切), have been eliminated by grade separating rail lines, generally by moving them onto viaducts (高架化 (kouka-ka)) or underground tracks (地下化 (chika-ka)).

=== Taiwan ===
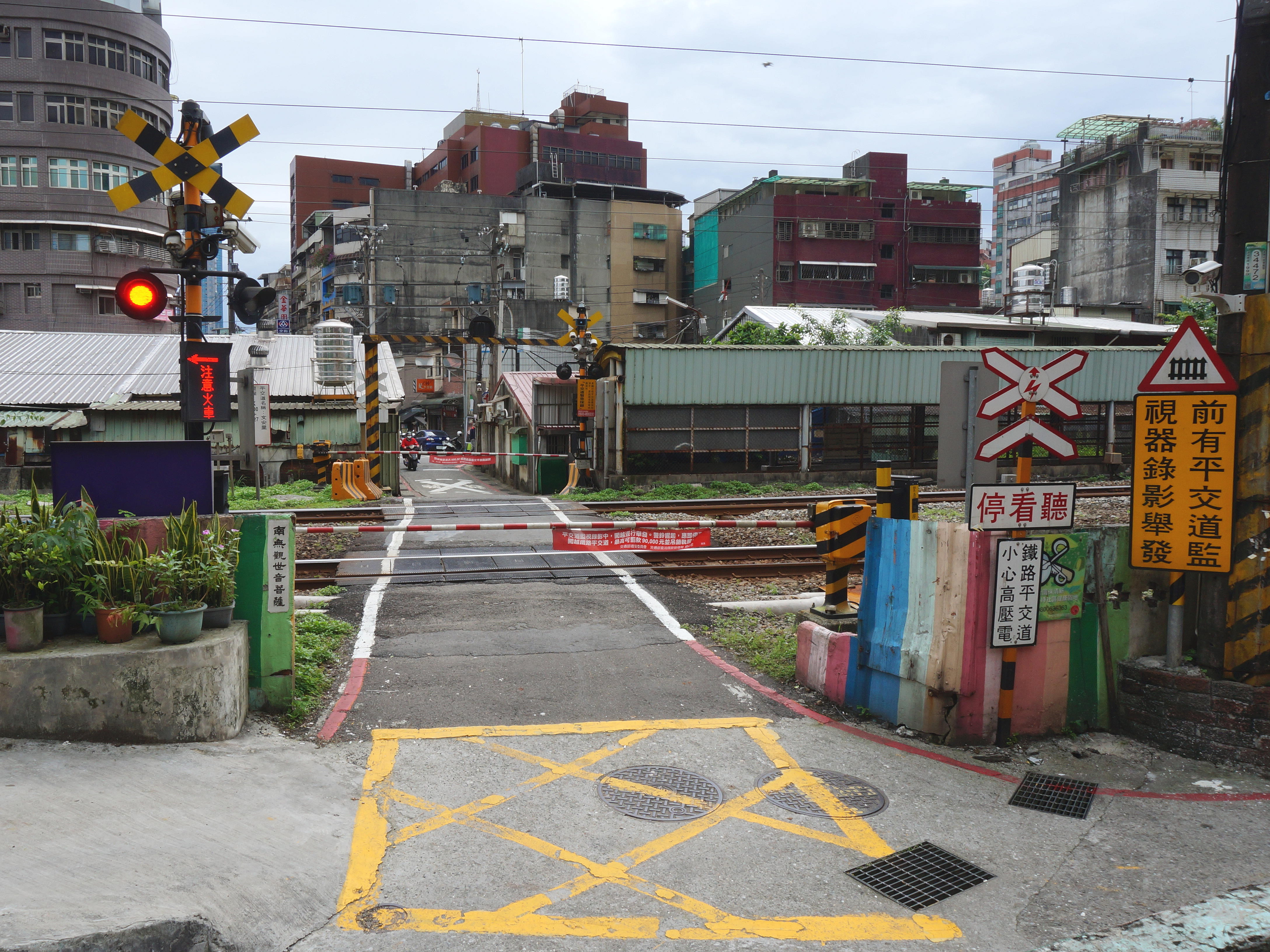
Taiwanese railway crossing

As most railways in Taiwan were built during Japanese administration, railway level crossings remain very common and generally built to the same design as Japan, though many urban crossings have been eliminated when the railroads have been moved underground, e.g. segments of the Western Trunk line in Taipei City and Kaohsiung City, or moved elevated, or has converted to cubic crossing with road, or abolished, e.g. the former TRA Tamsui Line that is now the Taipei Metro Tamsui Line without any level crossings.

Pointing to these eliminations, almost all "cable-railroad-crossings" have disappeared (instead of barriers, cables descended over the road). Only in Nan'ao Township, Xincheng Township, and in Chiayi would there still be any (and on sugar cane railways).

The Act Governing the Punishment of Violation of Road Traffic Regulations (Annotated Republic of China Laws/Road Traffic Management and Penalty Act (道路交通管理處罰條例) prescribes fines for drivers and pedestrians who commit certain classes of violations in regards to level crossings; these include disobeying flagmen, insisting to cross while signals are active or when the gate is being lowered, crossing a passive crossing without stopping beforehand, and overtaking, making a U-turn, backing up, stopping or parking on a railway level crossing in a vehicle. Pedestrians can be fined 2,400 new Taiwan dollars for a violation, drivers of non-motorized vehicles such as bicycles can be fined between 1,200 and 2,400 dollars, and drivers of motor vehicles can be fined up to 15,000 to 90,000 new Taiwan dollars for a violation. If an accident occurs, the driver's license can also be revoked for a minimum of six years, and drivers can also face legal responsibility and compensation of damages.

Accidents at railway level crossings remain a very serious concern, such as when a truck entered a level crossing and collided with the Taroko Express in Jan 17, 2012. The Taiwan Railway Administration alone has hundreds of level crossings along its routes of slightly more than 1,100 kilometres (680 mi). On average, there is a level crossing each 2 kilometres (1.2 mi). An emergency button is installed on every level crossing in the country, allowing members of the public to report emergencies at a crossing to authorities, such as stalled vehicles or other obstacles.

Taiwan once had many narrow gauge lines, mainly for sugar cane transport, but also for passengers. Of the 3000 km. is now only 20 km. in use, at Huwei. In this city are still "cable-railroad-crossings" in use.

=== Thailand ===
Thai crossings have two flashing lights that slowly flash, and are also equipped with bells. Each crossing that has gates has two yellow-orange strobe lights for better visibility when the gates are active. Most crossings have large flexible gates that fully block traffic from going around but other locations may use shorter gate arms. At many locations, the bells continues to sound for the duration of the gates being closed but at other crossings, the bells only sounds when the gates are closing and opening.

As of 2016, the Thai rail network has 2,624 level crossings nationwide. Many have no crossing barriers, making them frequent sites of accidents. Some level crossings are manually operated, where the barriers are lowered using a manual switch when trains approach. There were/are still "roller-gates" in use, but these are increasingly being replaced by heavy barriers. Sometimes they are still available as a reserve.

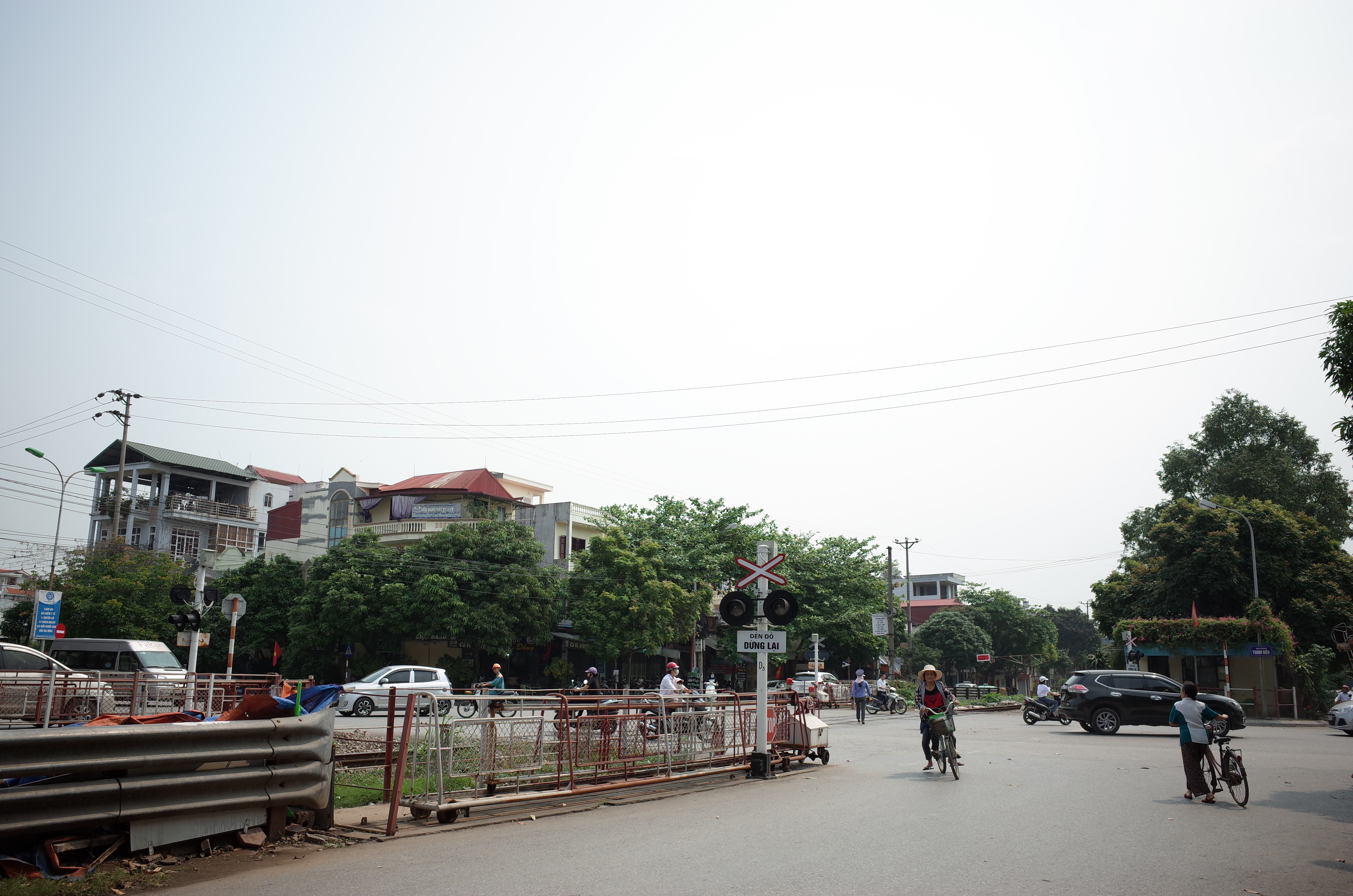
Vietnamese guarded railroad crossing in Hải Dương province

=== Vietnam ===
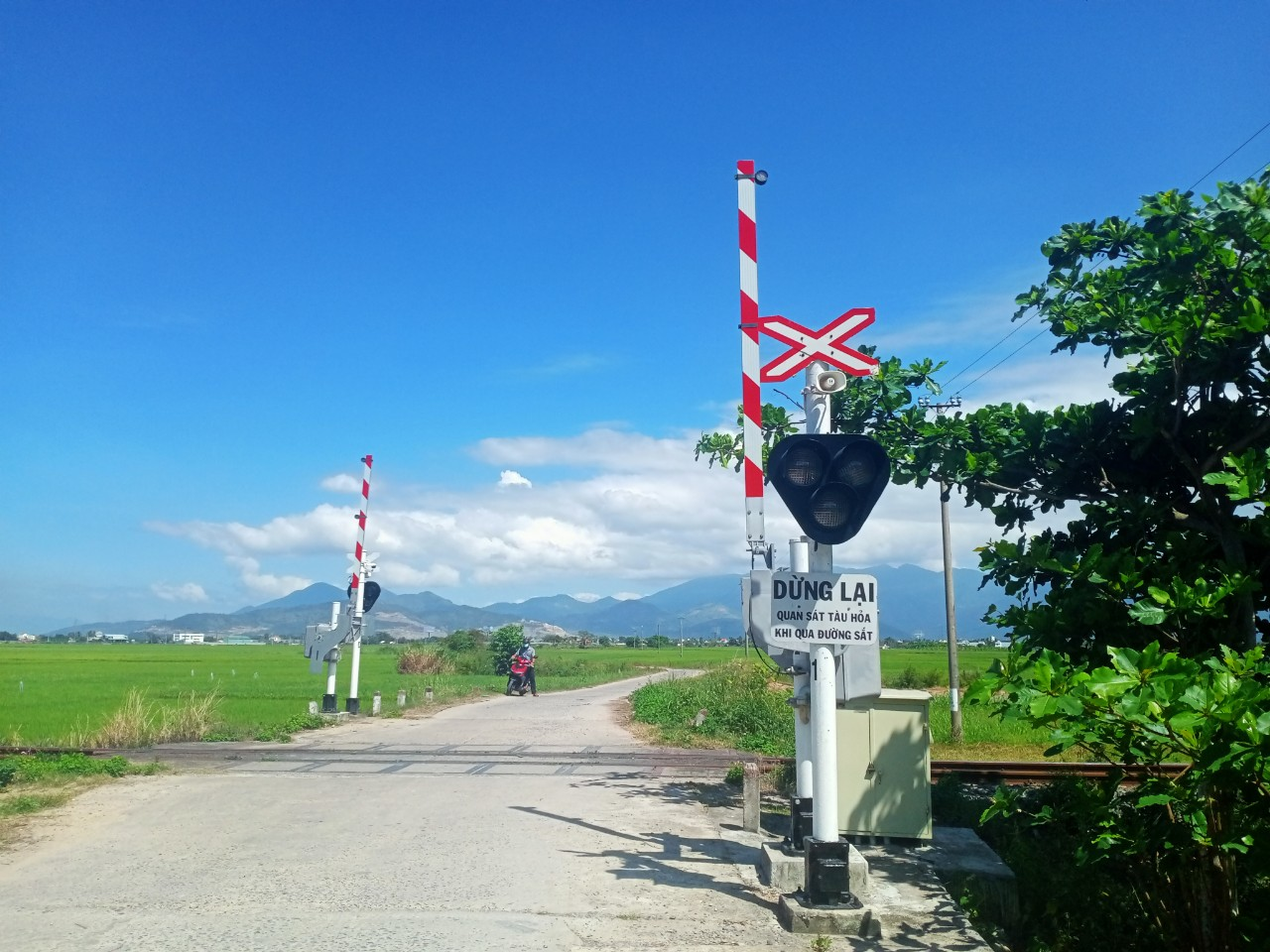
Vietnamese railroad crossing signals with lights & gates, and a 'stop, look for trains before crossing the track' sign below

All railroad crossing signs in Vietnam are based on the Russian Federation crossing signs with white crossbuck and red border (St. Andrew crossbuck), crossing each other at a 45-degree angle.

- Devices and signaling arranged at horizontal lines
  - Guarded crossroads: barrier or shields, signal lights, electric bells, signboards, marker poles, fences, road markings on roads, railroad roadside signals (if any), and other signaling devices when permitted by competent authorities;
  - Automatic warning crossings: signal lights, electric bells, signboards, marker posts or fences, with or without automatic barrier, road markings on road, and other signaling devices when possible authorized level;
  - Roads across the crossing: signboards, marker posts or fences, road markings, and other signaling devices when so permitted by competent authorities.
- Signal and equipment systems arranged at crossroads to ensure traffic safety and prevent accidents. All organizations and individuals must be responsible for protecting, not arbitrarily moving, appropriating, damaging or reducing the effectiveness and effect of the systems.

In Vietnam, there are still "roller~barriers/gates" in use, either electric or manual.

An extremely long level crossing is in Ho Chi Minh City, near Gò Vấp station, crossing Phạm Văn Đồng Street. The track crosses about twelve carriageways. There are 8 barriers and 2 very long roller-barriers/gates that must be pushed into place.

== Oceania ==
=== Australia ===
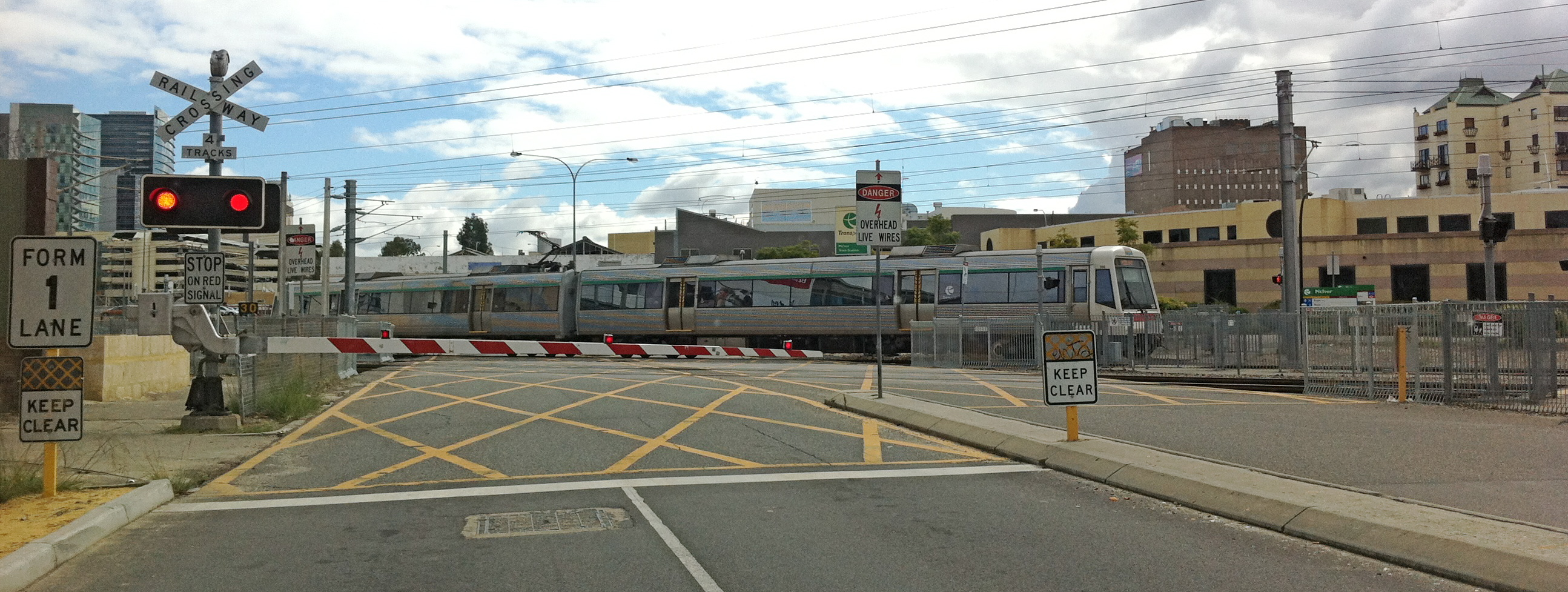
Level crossing in Perth

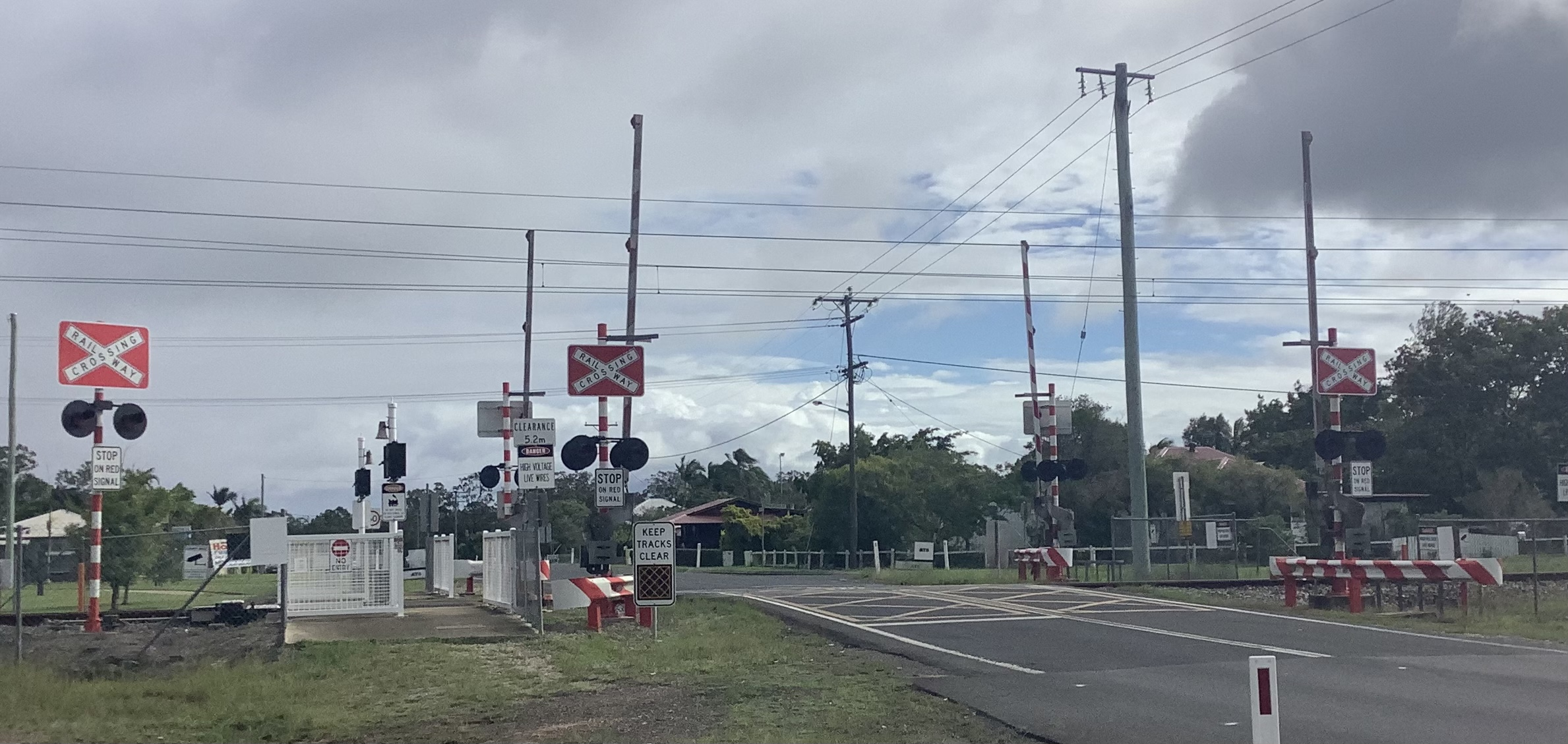
A railway crossing in Torbanlea, Queensland, Australia

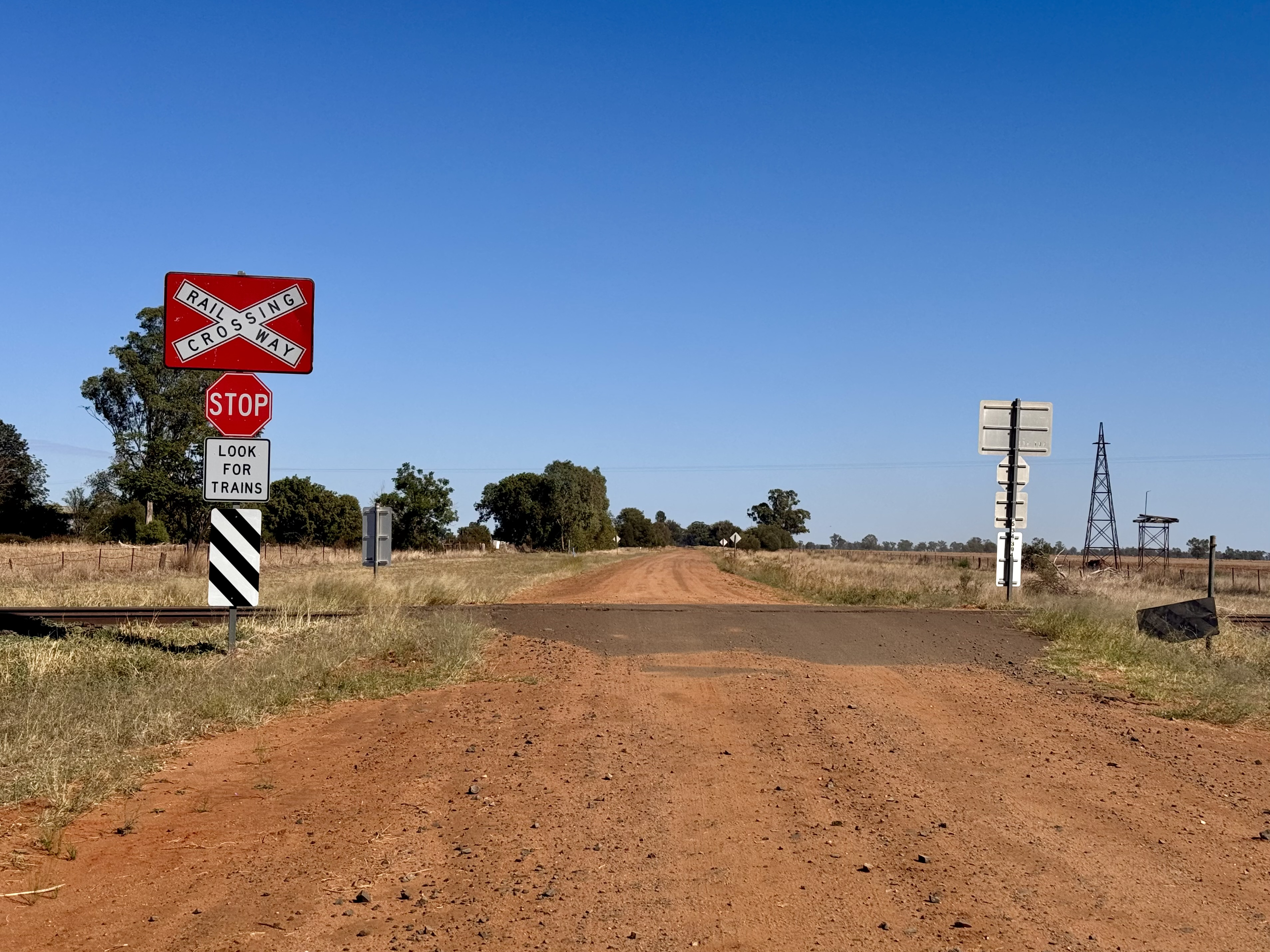
Many regional and rural level crossings in Australia, such as this one near Gilgandra, New South Wales, have no active warning measures to announce incoming trains.

Australian railways generally follow United States practices, and they have increasingly been employing American-made crossing warning equipment, such as level crossing predictors, which are able to provide a consistent amount of warning time for trains of widely varying speeds. There are many different types of rail crossings in Australia; railways that run through rural areas often do not have barriers or even lights/bells to warn of incoming trains, while urban crossings will either have lights and bells or lights, bells, and boom gates.

In Melbourne, there are two level crossings where electrified train tracks cross roads with electrified tram tracks: one at Riversdale and one at Kooyong. These crossings are fitted with equipment to change the voltage supplied to the overhead wiring depending on the vehicle using the crossing, and trains are severely speed-limited across these intersections. Due partly to this complication, as well as deaths, accidents and traffic problems at level crossings, the Victorian Government under former premier Daniel Andrews started the Level Crossing Removal Project in 2015 with the aim of removing 50 level crossings, which was later extended to 110.

All cases where a train line crosses a road are classified as level crossings whether or not they are signed. A tram track in its own right-of-way crossing a road can also be classified as a level crossing if it is signed with a crossbuck reading either "tramway crossing" or "railway crossing". Otherwise, it is considered a regular intersection and usually has either traffic lights or a give-way sign facing the road (see Gallery).

Some innovations in Australia are crossbucks with a pair of flashing yellow lights at about 200 metres (660 ft) before the level crossing, called advance active warning signals (AAWS). This is done particularly where there are curves and other visibility problems on the road. AAWS are used where road speeds are high, and braking distances are extended, or where the level crossing is obscured by blind curves or sunlight. Another innovation is to transmit level crossing warning signals by radio into the cabin of nearby vehicles. This is useful at passive crossings, which are not fitted with flashing lights.

In areas subject to the Advanced Train Management System (ATMS), level crossings are controlled by satellite downlinks, and supervised by satellite uplinks.

Australia also has about 4000 km of sugar-cane narrow-gauge railways. Many level crossings on these lines are protected with the regular red railway warning lights and crossbucks, often supplemented by a red flashing light on top of the pole. Level crossings with barriers are very rare.

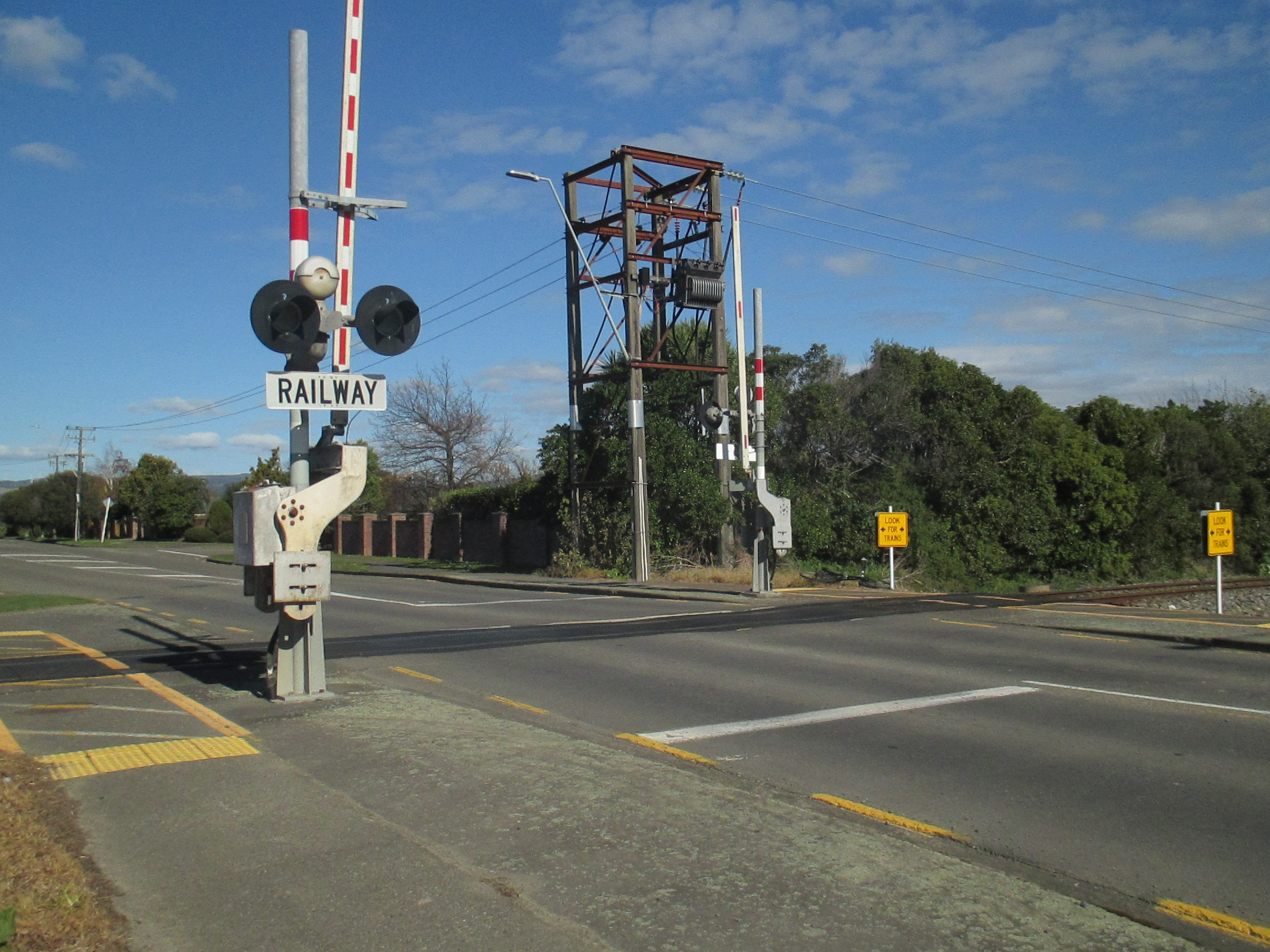
Railway crossing of New Zealand

=== New Zealand ===
There were (in 2012) 1330 public road level crossings in New Zealand, of which 275 crossings are protected by flashing red lights, bells, and half-arm barriers; and 421 are protected by flashing red lights and bells only. The remainder are controlled by "Stop and Give Way" signs. Level crossings are the responsibility of rail infrastructure owner KiwiRail Network, the NZ Transport Agency, and if the crossing is on a local road, the local city or district council. Much like Australia, New Zealand employs American-made crossing warning equipment.

On the Taieri Gorge Railway in rural South Island, roads and railways share the same bridge when crossing a river, with the rail line in the road. Motorists, as well as giving way to oncoming traffic if required (the bridges have one lane) must ensure that the bridge is clear of a train, end to end, before starting to cross the bridge. For safety, trains are limited to 10 km/h (6 mph) while crossing the bridges.

In many parts of New Zealand, railway lines run parallel to and close (within 10–15 metres [33–49 ft]) to roads. Many level crossing accidents have been caused by drivers turning right into side roads crossing the railway line concentrating on finding a suitable gap in oncoming traffic so that they fail to check the railway line or notice the activated level crossing alarms until it is too late to stop. An accident of this type occurred in August 1993 at Rolleston, near Christchurch, when a cement mixer truck turned right off State Highway 1 and collided with the side of a southbound Southerner passenger train, ripping open two carriages. The accident resulted in three deaths, including the sister of New Zealand international cricketer Chris Cairns.

Near-misses are common in Auckland and Wellington where there are frequent commuter trains on double-tracks where a train may be followed by another train in the opposite direction (sometimes a non-stop freight train).

In 2019, KiwiRail changed the rate of flashing lights at level crossings from 85 fpm (flashes per minute) to the standard laid down by the "American Railway Engineering and Maintenance-of-Way Association" of 50 fpm so that a new order for level crossing equipment did not have non-standard requirements. In 2019 KiwiRAil also said that it would install "half Crosses" at level crossings to reduce the number of "near misses".
