= Hotel Mac =

- U.S. Historic district – Contributing property
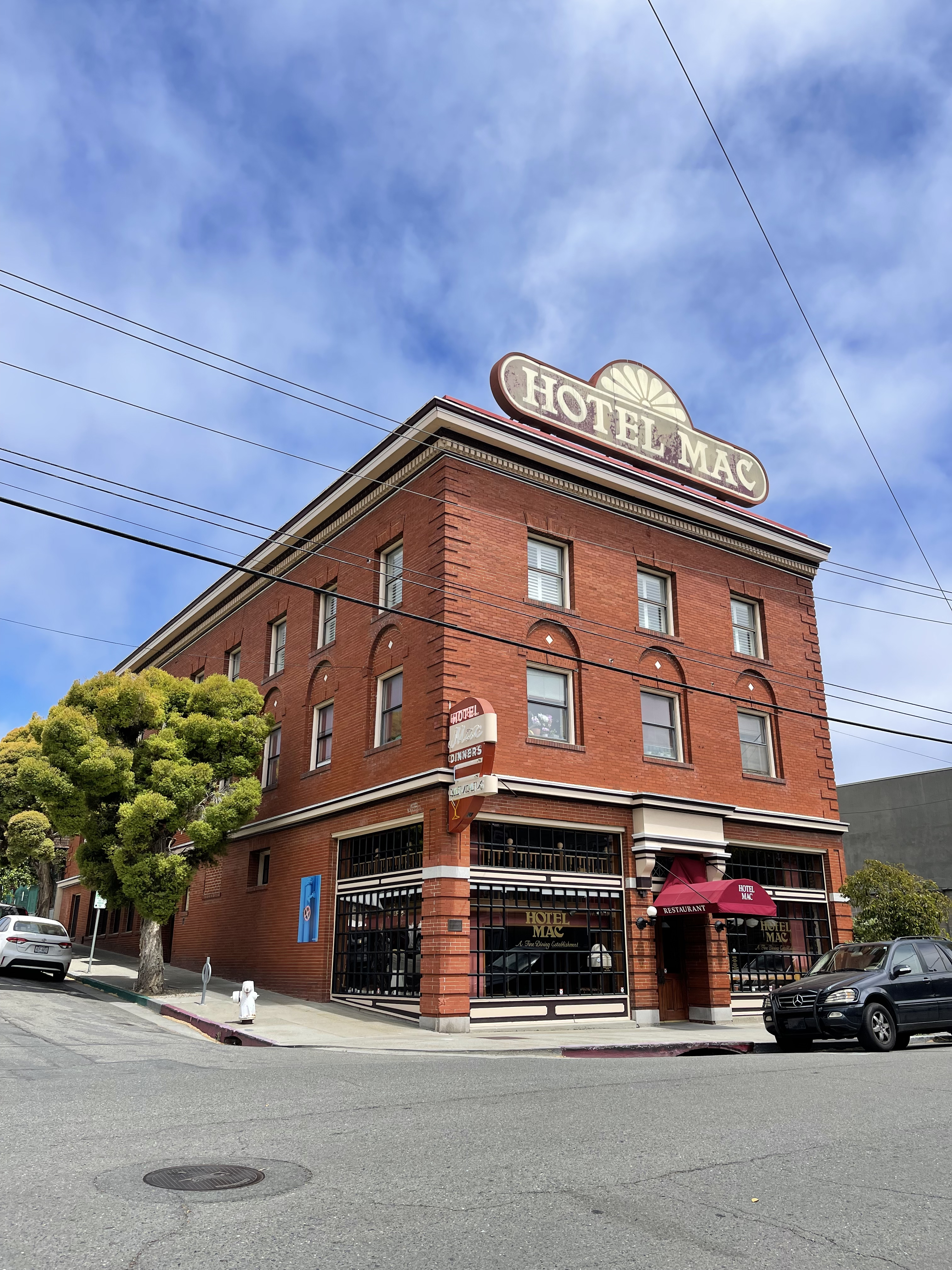
- Hotel Mac in 2022

- Location within San Francisco Bay Area Location within California Location within the United States
- Location: Richmond, California (Pt. Richmond)
- Coordinates: 37.927342°N 122.384800°W
- Built: 1911
- Part of: Point Richmond Historic District

Hotel Mac is a historic hotel and restaurant, that was built in 1911 and is located in the historic Point Richmond neighborhood of Richmond, California in the United States. The successful hotel and bar was owned throughout the 1960s by Mr.John Nunez. Nunez was forced to sell the property as the state had plans for the construction of the Carlson Freeway (I 580). The freeway was eventually completed without disturbing the property.

== History ==
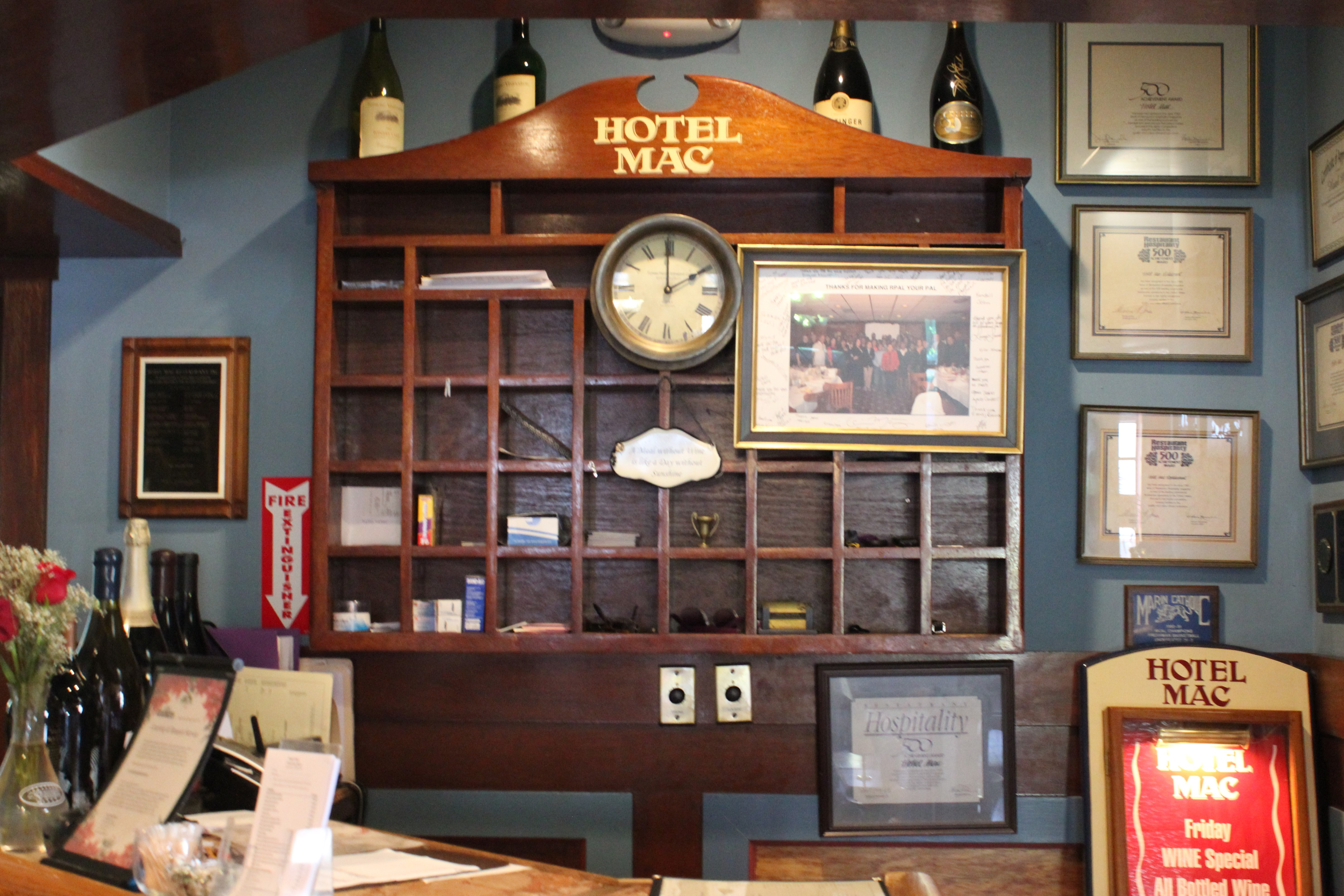
Hotel Mac Front Desk

The original hotel was built in 1911 and named the Colonial Hotel. It served many different people, but mostly workers from the nearby Standard Oil refinery (now the Chevron Richmond Refinery). In the 1930s it was purchased by J. V. McAfee, a former manager at the Claremont Hotel. He also changed its name to the Hotel Mac.

Beginning in the 1940s and 1950s, however, Hotel Mac began to lose its popularity and character. In 1971 a fire damaged the structure, and it closed for business. In 1978 Bill Burnett and Griff Brazil formed a company to restore and reopen Hotel Mac as a fine dining restaurant. The hotel also reopened.

In the fall of 2020, the restaurant's owner shuttered the restaurant's doors as a result of lost revenue due to the COVID-19 pandemic.

== Today ==
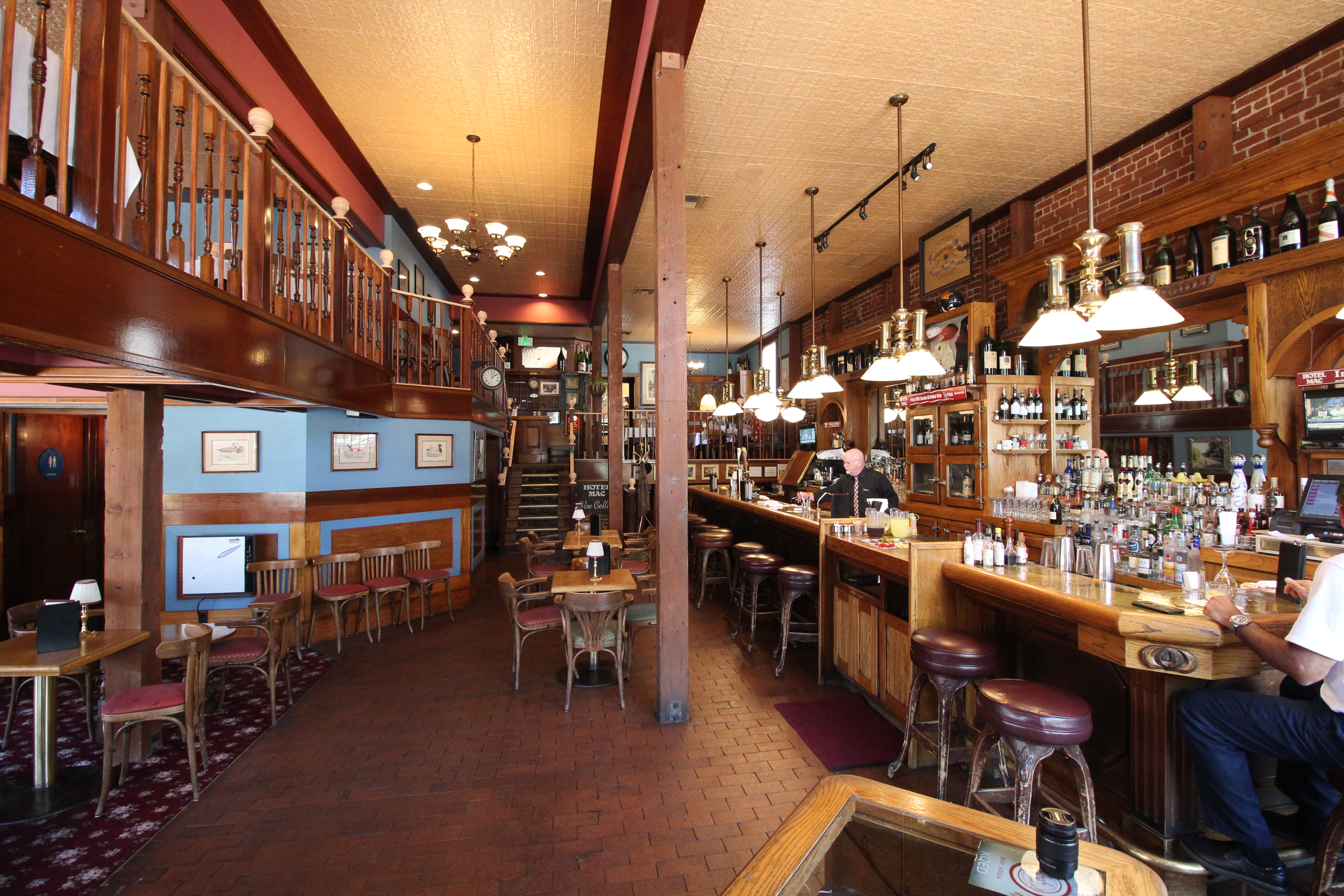
Bar and Restaurant of Hotel Mac in 2017

Both the hotel and restaurant closed during the COVID-19 lockdowns, but the hotel reopened in 2021. The restaurant was sold to new owners, Richmond restaurateurs Blanca Zepeda Lomeli and her husband Juvenal Magaña, who opened the restaurant and bar, now named Ristorante Biancoverde, on July 13, 2023.

The hotel is notable because each of its 10 rooms are decorated with slightly different styles and color schemes. Hotel Mac is a contributing property to the Point Richmond Historic District, and was also listed on the National Register of Historic Places in 1979.
