= Brickyard Cove =

Cove in California, United States

Coordinates: 37.907703°N 122.387194°W

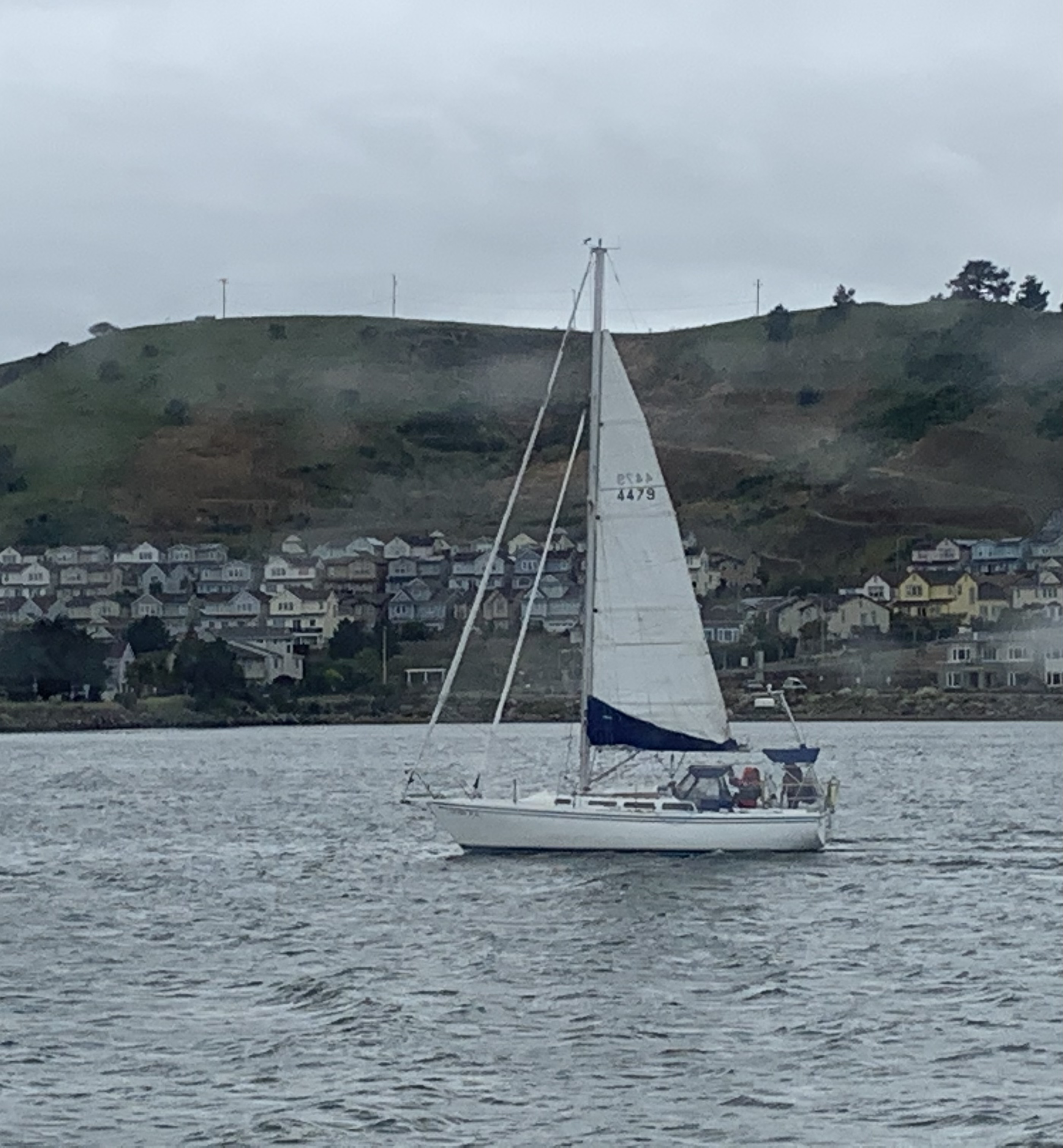
Sailboat with the cove in background

Brickyard Cove is a body of water in the Brickyard Cove neighborhood of the Point Richmond area of Richmond, California. The cove is situated between the Harbor Channel, a deepwater shipping channel that connects the San Francisco Bay with the Port of Richmond and the mainland. The cove is located between Point Potrero and Ferry Point. A marina is located in the cove and the Red Oak Victory part of Rosie the Riveter/World War II Homefront National Historic Park is docked in the western end of the cove.

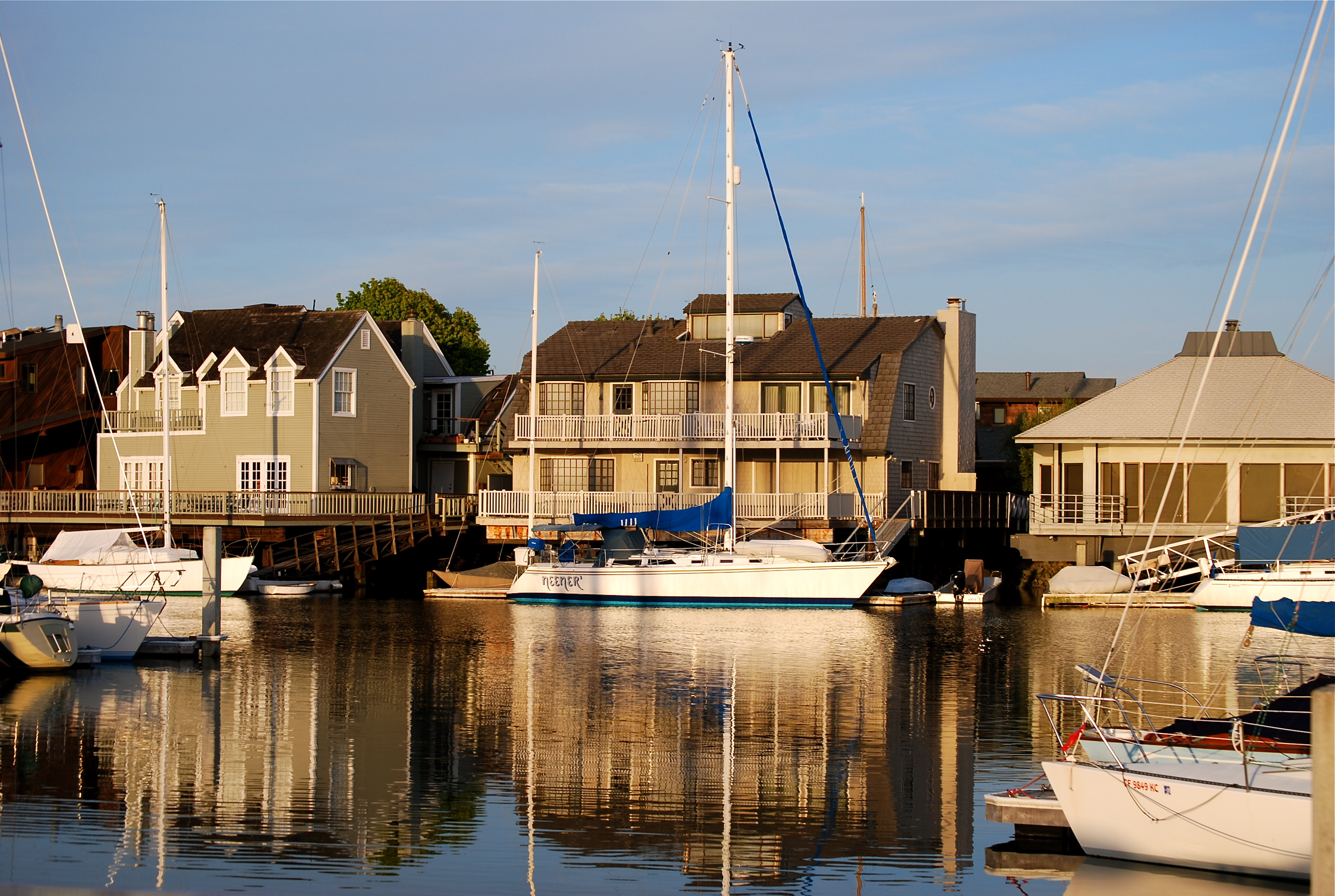
The Brickyard Marina at Brickyard Cove

Brickyard Cove was once home to Richmond Brick Company. Richmond Brick Company used the area to create bricks used to build various structures in "Point Richmond" and various other structures on the East Coast. The "Bee-Hive" Kilns are still present onsite. Richmond Brick Company was owned by the "Sevy Family".

Brickyard Cove is also home to The Brickyard Cove, a marina in the Point Richmond neighborhood.

== Brickyard Cove History ==
Originally inhabited by the Ohlone people, European settlers first utilized the area for cattle grazing and as a fishing outpost.

As Richmond began to industrialize in the late 19th century, the cove gained prominence for its brick manufacturing, which gave the area its name. The abundant local clay was ideal for brickmaking, a critical component in San Francisco's and surrounding cities’ development. The demand for sturdy building materials was skyrocketing during the region's rapid urbanization and recovery from significant events like the 1906 earthquake. The bricks produced here helped rebuild and expand the growing metropolis, providing the foundations for many iconic buildings and paving the way for future developments.

Bert Clausen (W.B. Clausen), Commodore of the Richmond Yacht Club in 1961, led the search for a permanent home for the club. At the time, the Yacht Club was located on Cutting Boulevard in Richmond, near Canal Street, operating on a month-to-month rental lease with the Santa Fe Railroad Company. This precarious lease motivated the club to seek a more secure location, with the ultimate goal of owning their own property.

Through research into available waterfront properties, Clausen identified a site near a brickyard on the south shoreline of Richmond, owned by the Macdonald-Henshaw group. The property comprised approximately 143 acres, most of which was underwater. In December 1961, Clausen and fellow member Herb Thode made an offer to purchase 14 acres near the Garrard Boulevard entrance.

Starting in 1963, Bert Clausen led the development of the new Yacht Club facility. Surveys were conducted, a harbor layout was designed, and construction began. Floating breakwaters were installed but were soon replaced with permanent ones after the original design proved ineffective.

The harbor was dedicated, with the first boats entering their slips on Sunday, January 31, 1965. Jens Hansen, a Yacht Club member and architect, designed the new clubhouse, which was completed in April 1966. Permanent breakwaters were finished in September 1966, solidifying the Richmond Yacht Club's status and giving rise to the area now known as “Brickyard Cove.”

== Brickyard Cove Today ==
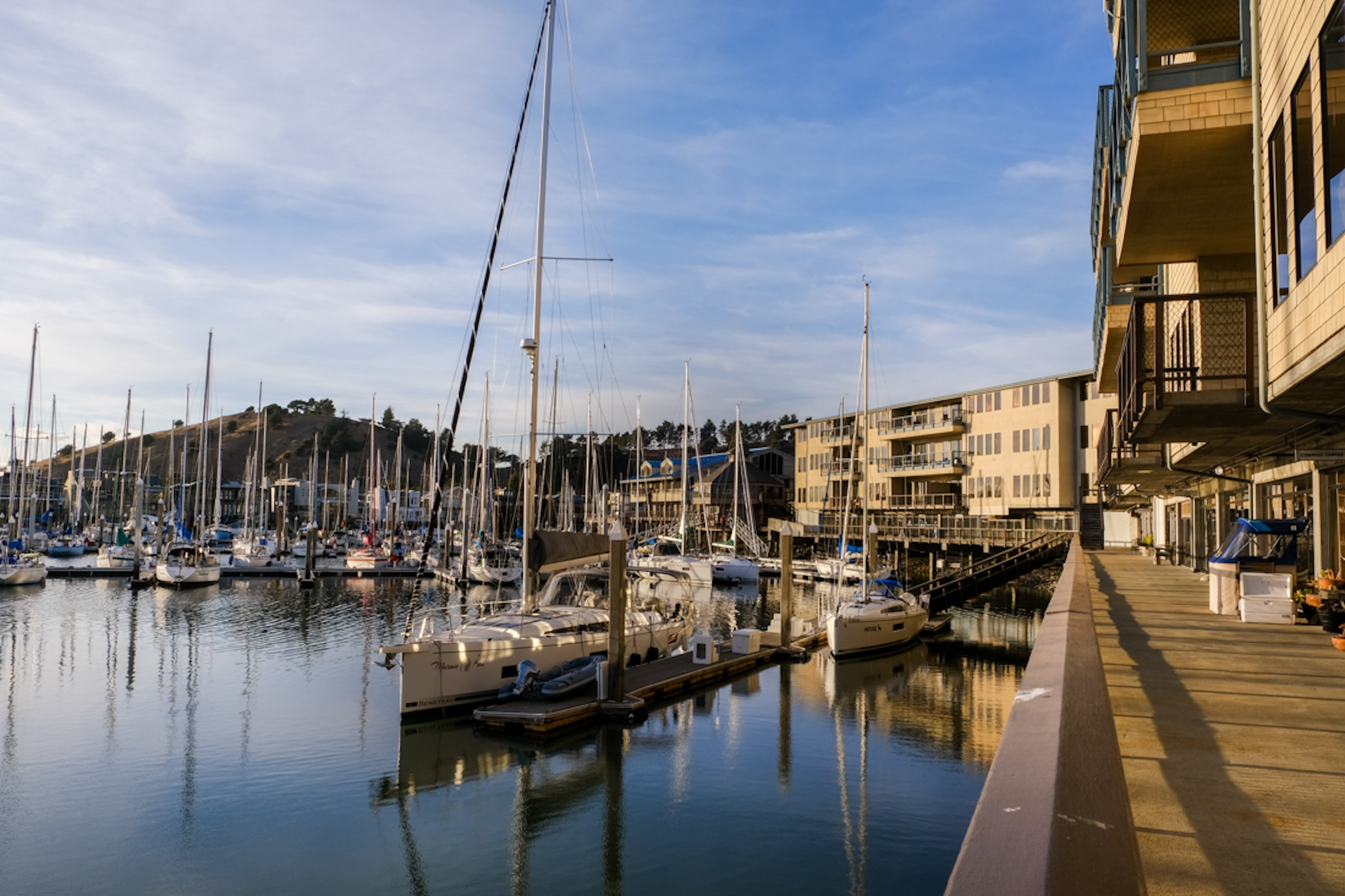

Brickyard Cove is now home to The Brickyard Marina, a popular Richmond marina. It continues to be a hub for boating enthusiasts and a vibrant residential community, reflecting the vision and efforts of Bert and Muriel Clausen to transform the waterfront into a thriving space.

Offering over 250 berths for boats of various sizes, the marina has top-notch facilities, including maintenance docks, a fuel station, and a boater's lounge. Its location, sheltered from the typical winds of San Francisco Bay, makes it an ideal spot for boating enthusiasts.
