= The Plunge =

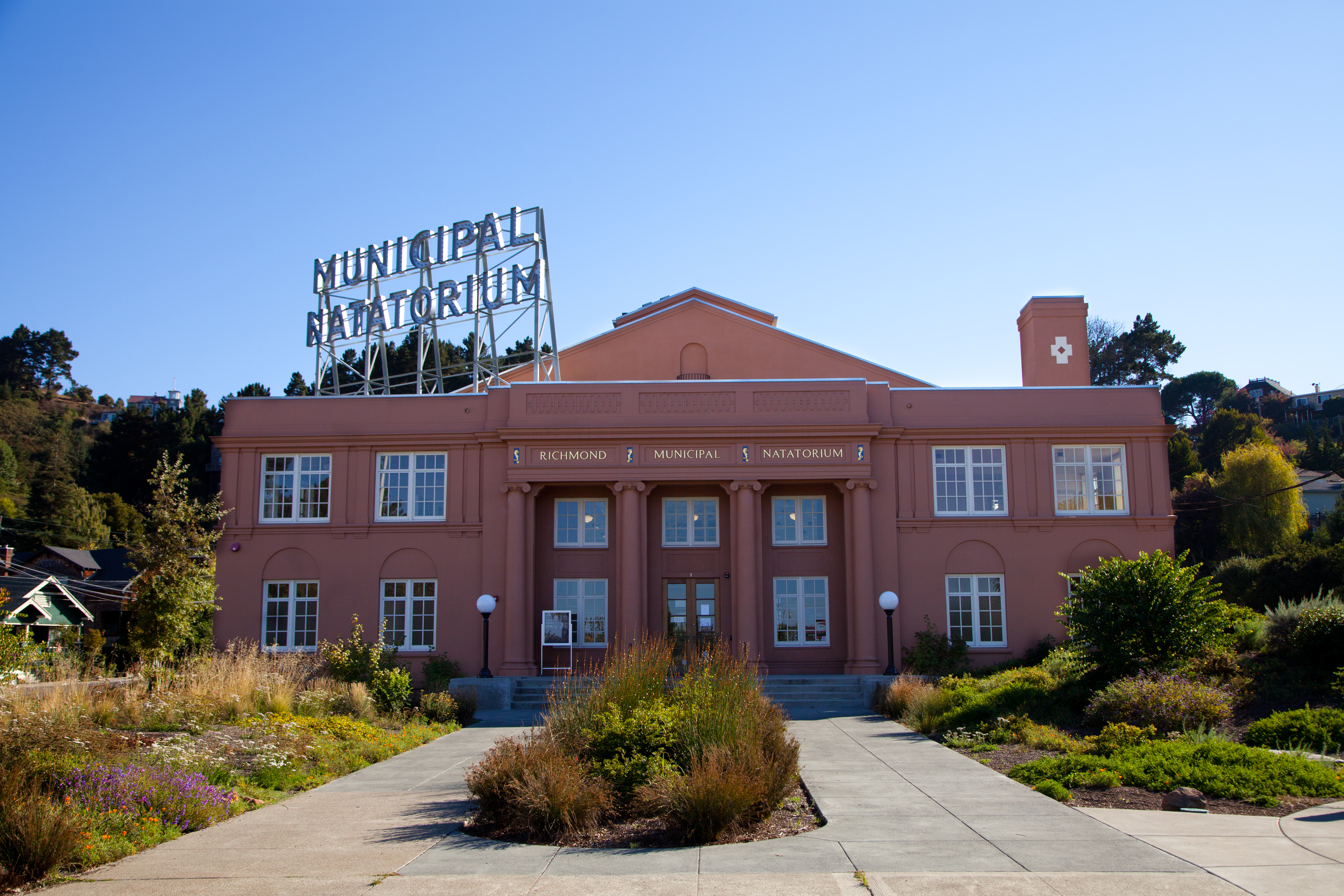

- Location within San Francisco Bay Area Location within California Location within the United States

General information
- Location: Richmond, California
- Coordinates: 37°55′27.84″N 122°23′2.82″W
- Completed: 1926

The Richmond Municipal Natatorium, commonly known as The Plunge or The Richmond Plunge, is a historic swim center in the Point Richmond neighborhood of Richmond, California. It was closed in August 2001 for seismic retrofitting and reopened in August 2010. It now is back to a regular schedule.

== History ==
Promoted by the citizens of Richmond, The Plunge was created through a bond issue in 1926. At that time, it was a "state of the art" two-story building with an indoor warm water swimming pool double the size of an Olympic pool, a fountain, observation balconies, and an open truss ceiling reminiscent of the Sutro Baths in San Francisco. Richmond's population was about 20,000 then, grew to over 200,000 during the "war years" and is now about 110,000.

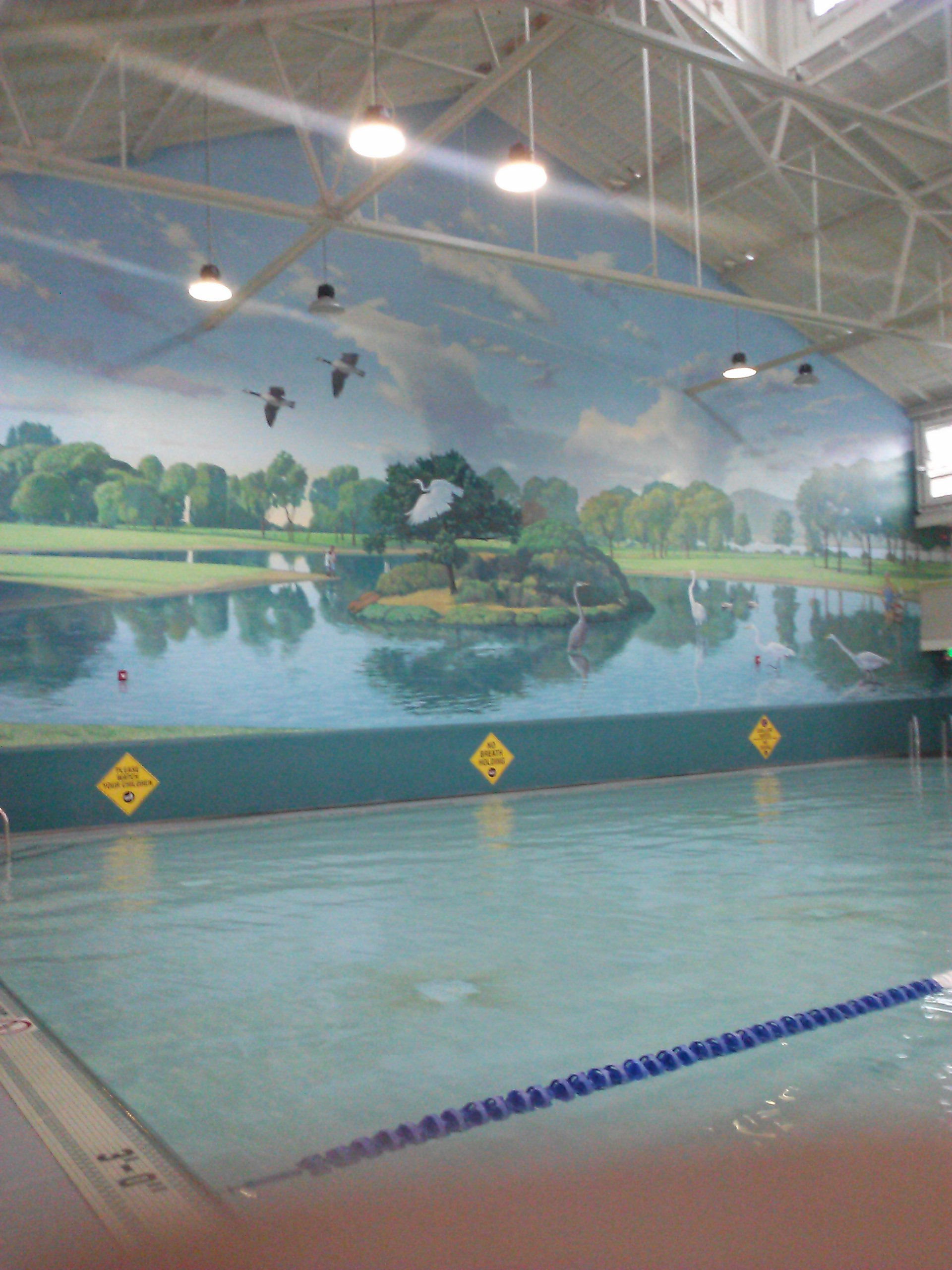
Mural of Miller/Knox Regional Park lagoon

Over the years, the masonry building deteriorated, the hollow-clay-tile walls cracking after 76 years of deferred maintenance. Richmond Friends of Recreation (RFR) was organized in 1979 as a non-profit organization with the purpose of supporting community recreation programs, spearheaded a major rehabilitation of the pool equipment and repainting of the structure. The Plunge was further damaged in the 1989 Loma Prieta earthquake. City voters rejected a bond measure to reinforce it in 1997. In November 1997, the City Council realized they did not have the funds to retrofit the building and determined they had no option but to close the Plunge permanently. However, even though it was unsafe, people were allowed to swim in it until August 2001, although they had to pass "Swim at your own risk" signs.

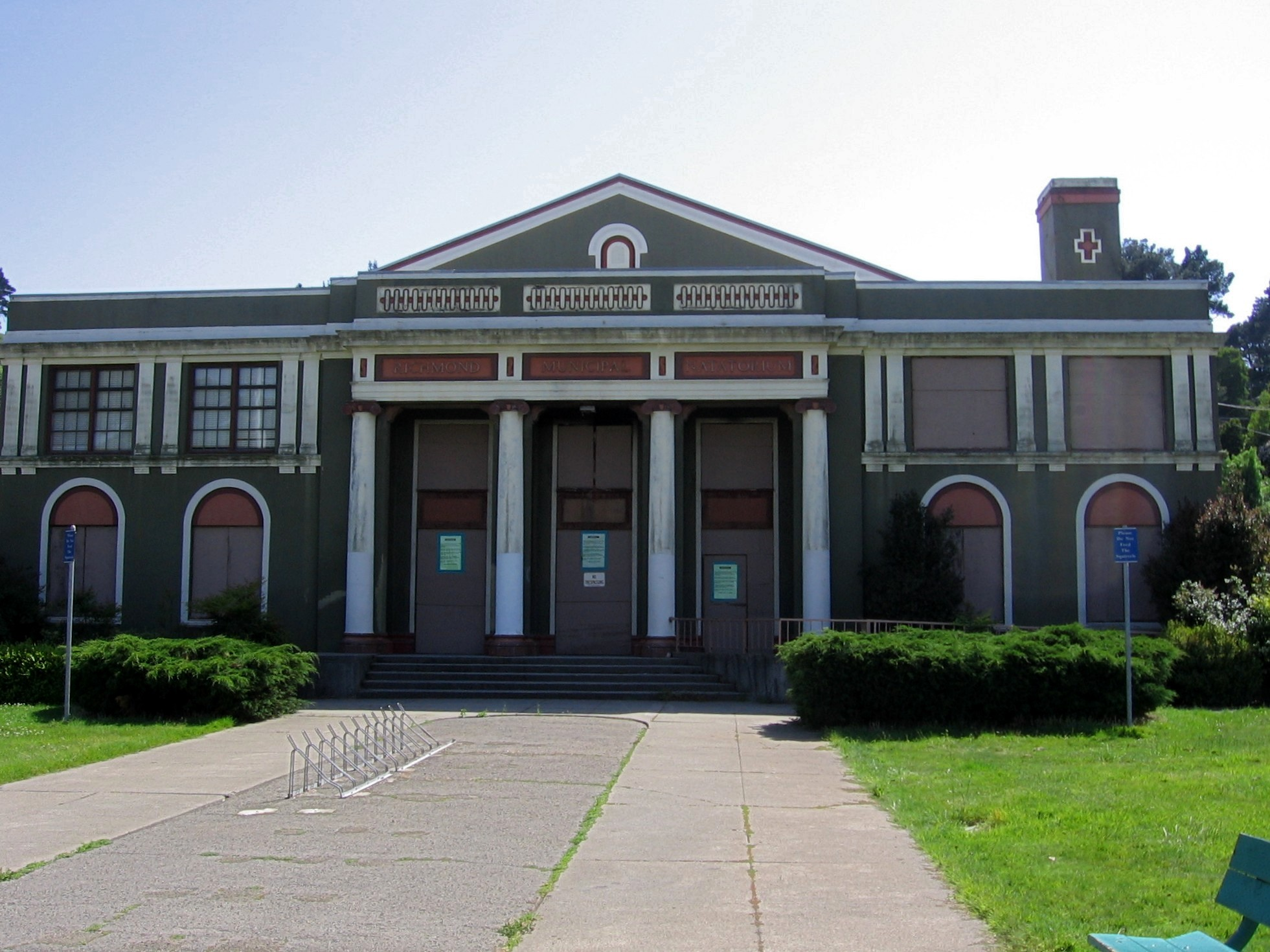
The Plunge in 2007

When the Plunge was slated for demolition, residents protested and RFR stepped in to work with the City in a unique Public/Private Partnership to raise the necessary funds to retrofit, upgrade and reopen the Plunge. The renovation planning process was complicated by the fact that the Plunge is located in the Point Richmond Historic District, which is on the National Register of Historic Places. This meant that officials had to ensure the renovation would not damage the site's historic value.

== Restoration ==
Richmond Friends of Recreation established a "Save the Richmond Plunge Trust" under its tax-exempt status and raised over $154,000 in cash and in excess of $40,000 in-kind donations from local business owners. It committed to an ambitious campaign of appeals to corporations, foundations, and individuals and a calendar of community events to recruit workers and raise funds.

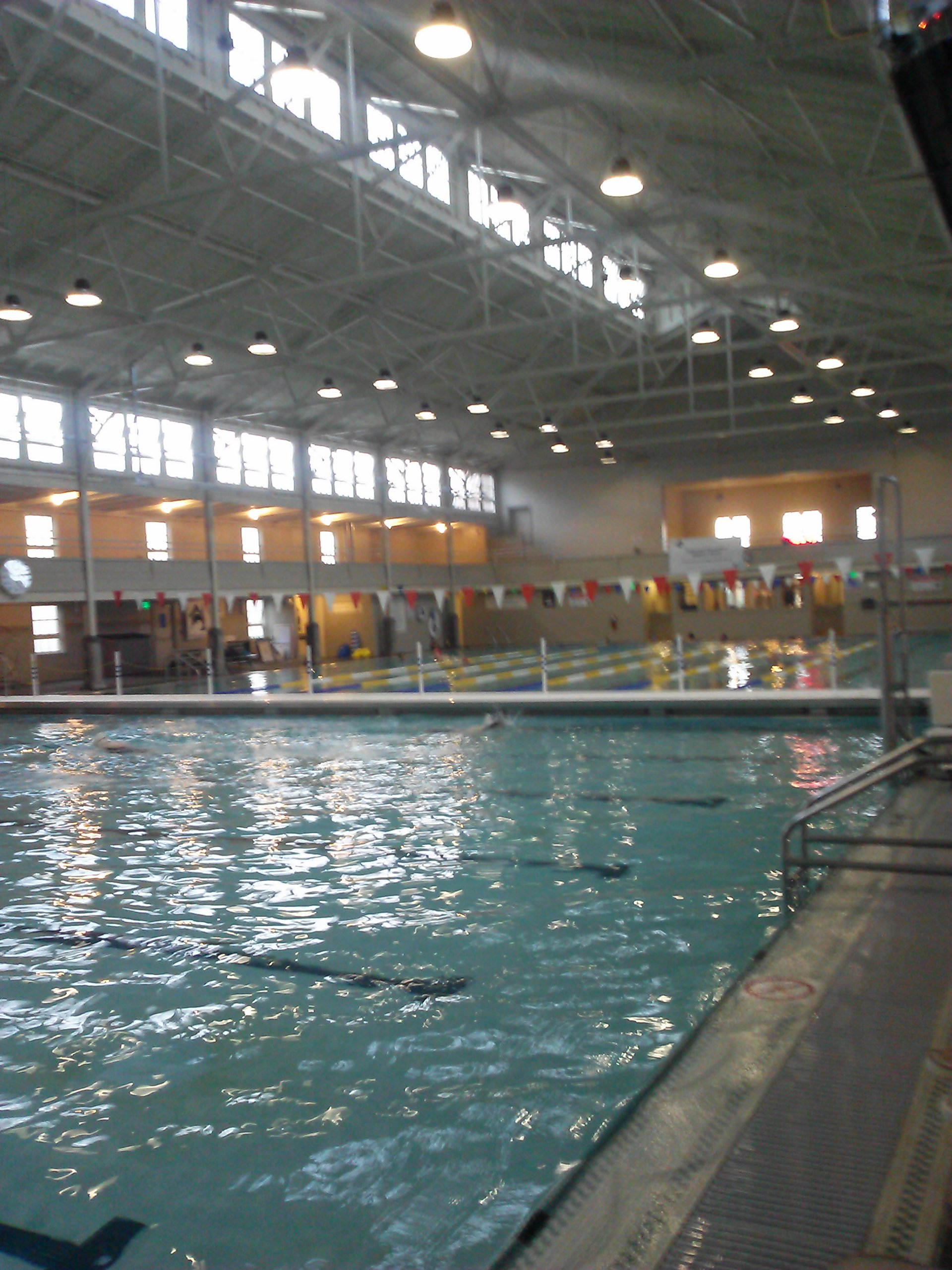
The interior of the natatorium

Architect Todd Jersey of Todd Jersey Architecture in Berkeley donated hundreds of hours to the Plunge restoration project, with the hopes of making the Plunge the most environmentally friendly public pool in the country. Jersey raised a portion of the roof to add windows, improving ventilation and light. Overall, the building has more than 170 windows, 132 of which will be able to open and close.

The first phase of reconstruction began in August 2008.

The Plunge is accessible from Interstate 580 and AC Transit line 72M Macdonald.

== Restoration images (August 15, 2009) ==
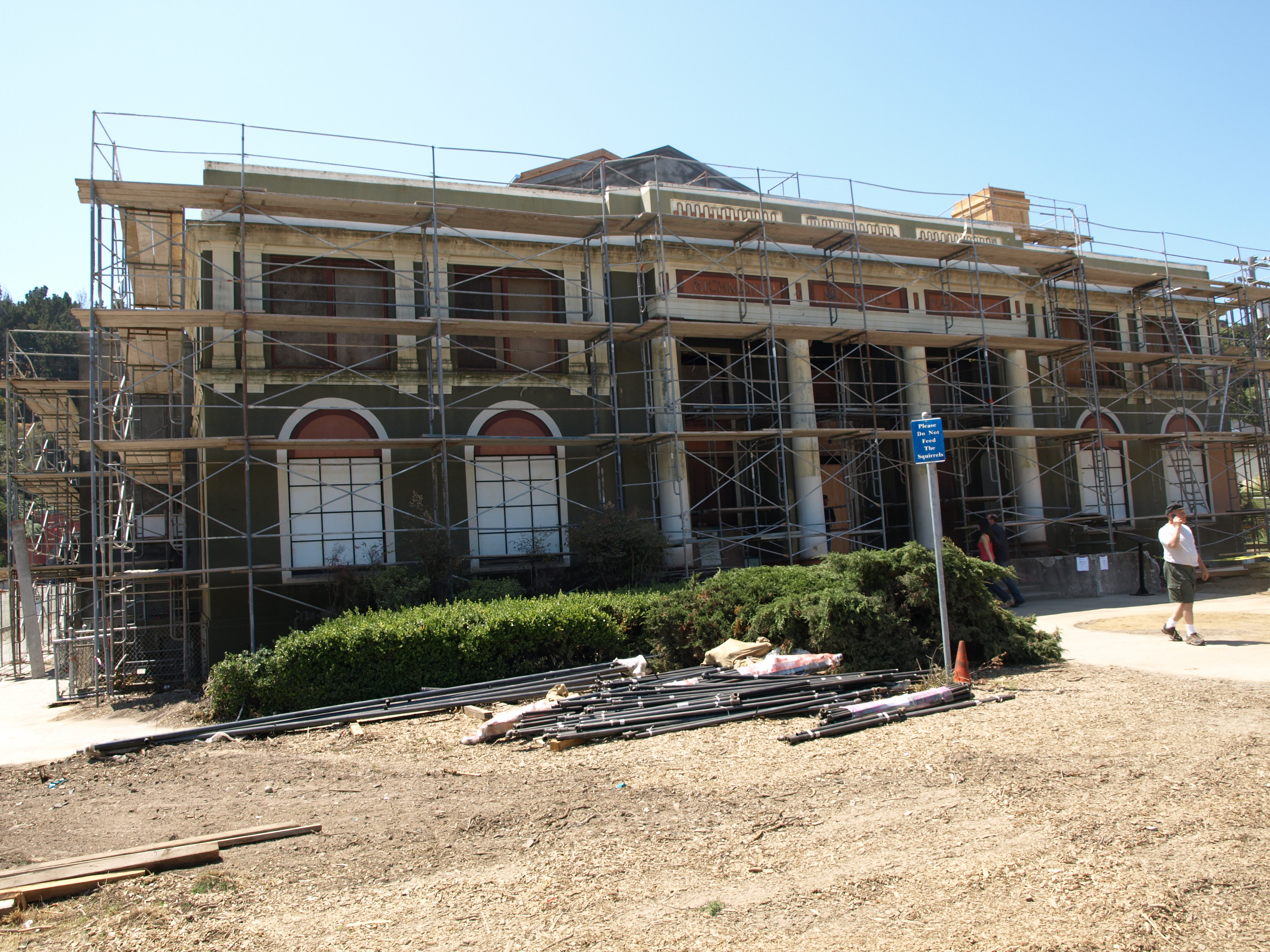
Exterior scaffolding

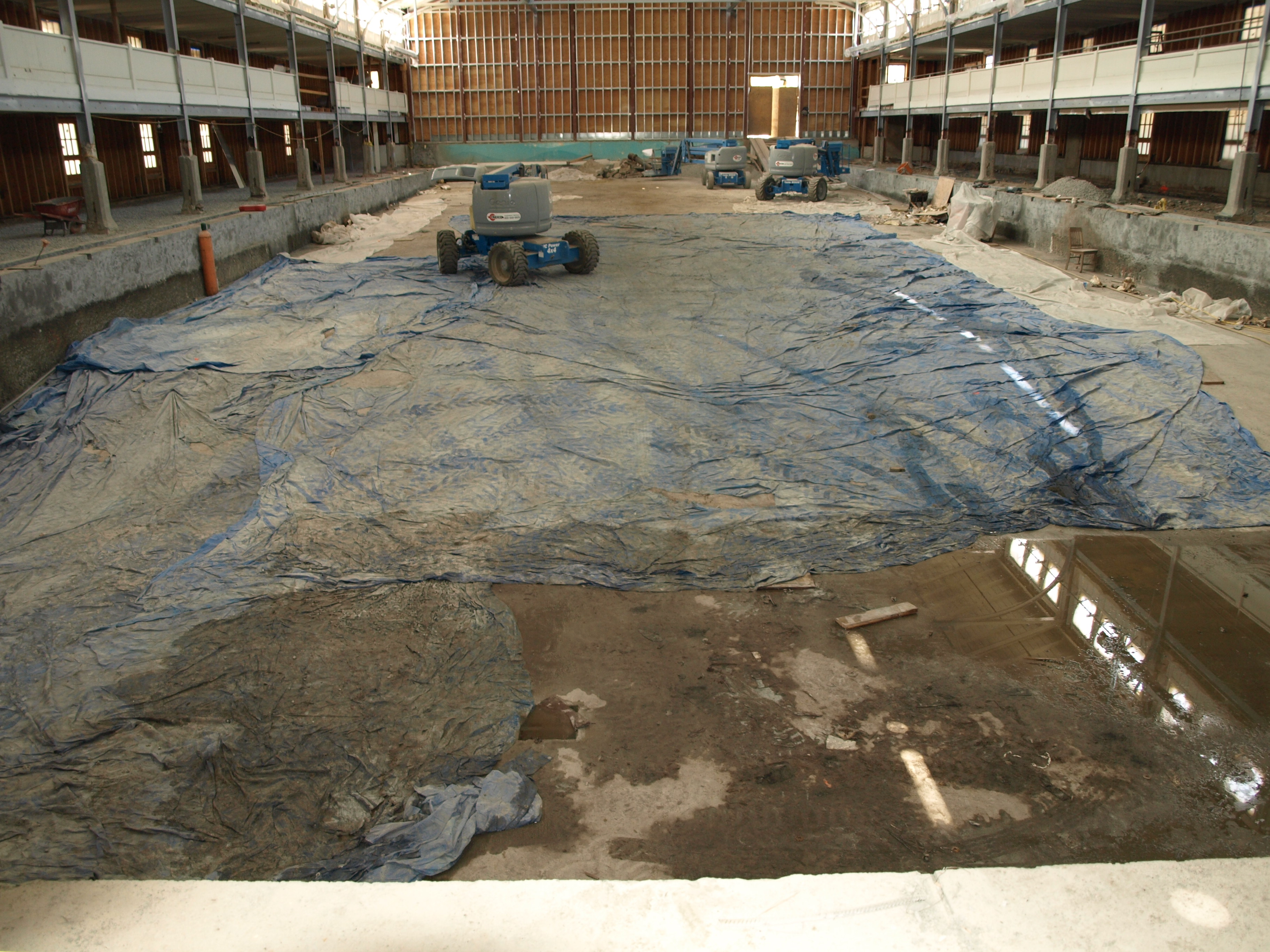
Pool excavation

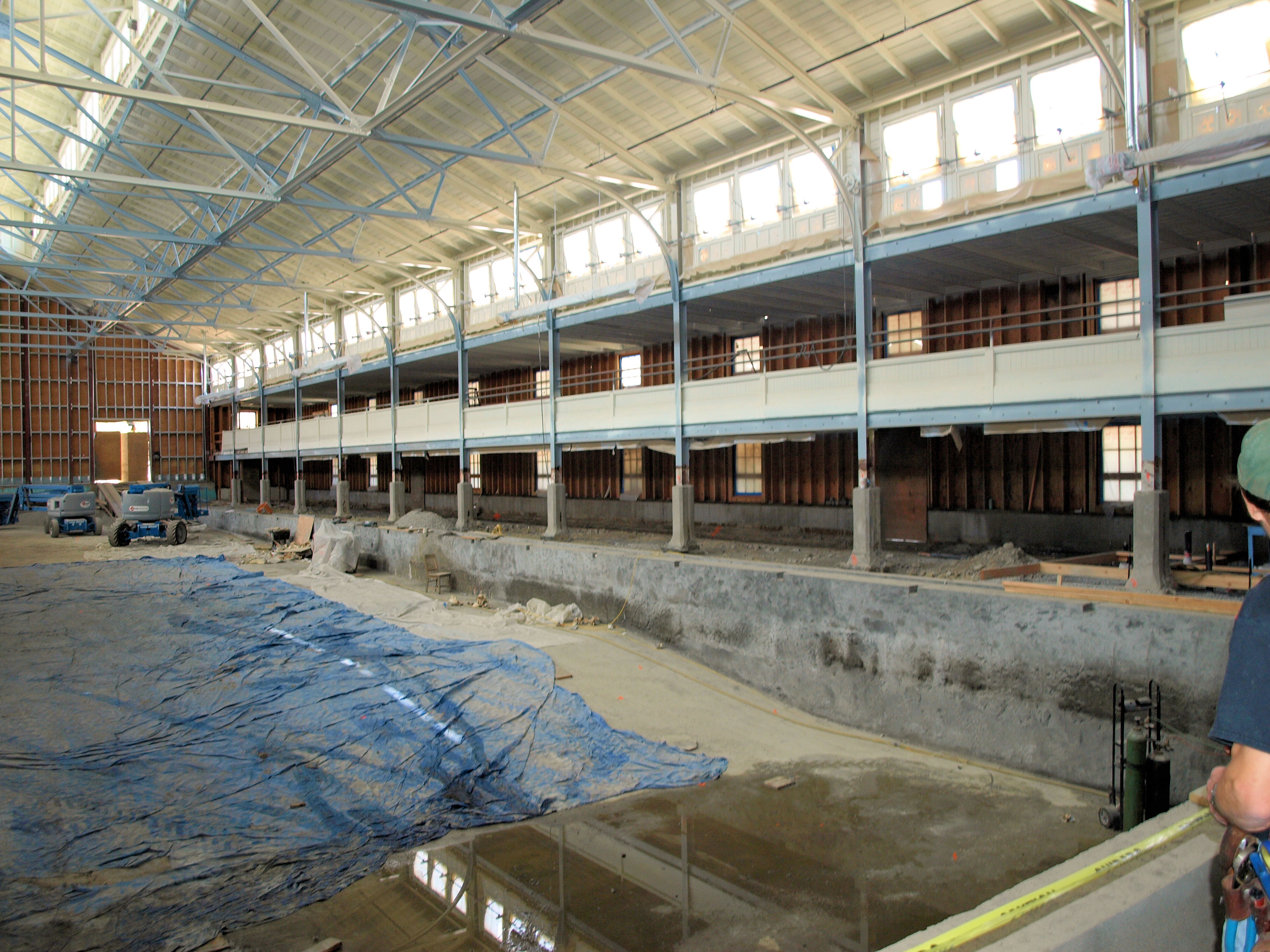
Side galleries
