= Ferry Point =

There are many places named Ferry Point in the world:

- Ferry Point, Hampshire on the Hayling Island of England
- Ferry Point, Hong Kong in Kowloon, Hong Kong
- Ferry Point, California, United States
- Ferry Point Border Crossing on the U.S.–Canada border
- Ferry Point Park in the Bronx, New York City
