= Oakland station (Atchison, Topeka and Santa Fe Railway) =

Oakland
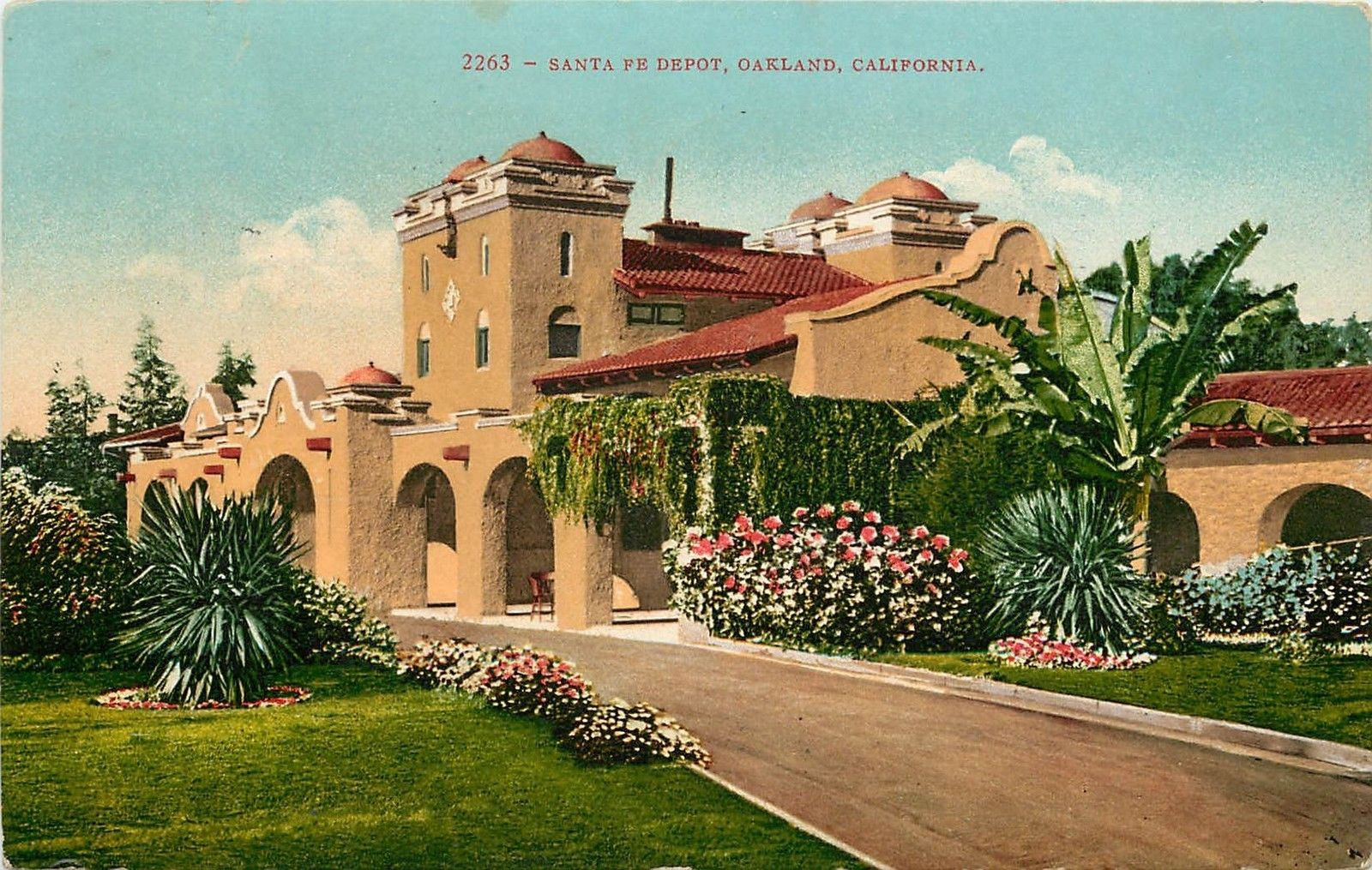

General information
- Location: Emeryville, California
- Coordinates: 37.8302°N 122.2816°W
- Owner: Atchison, Topeka and Santa Fe Railway
- Line: Valley Division
- Connections: Key System

History
- Opened: May 16, 1904
- Closed: June 15, 1958

Former services
Preceding station	Atchison, Topeka and Santa Fe Railway	Following station
Terminus	Valley Division	Berkeley toward Barstow
Oakland Pier 1933–1937 Terminus	Valley Division	Berkeley toward Barstow
Preceding station	Key System	Following station
at 40th & San Pablo
Hollis Street toward Transbay Terminal	C	Market Street toward Oakland Avenue
Hollis Street toward Transbay Terminal	E	43rd Street toward Claremont
Hollis Street toward Transbay Terminal	F	43rd Street toward Solano & The Alameda
Hollis Street toward Transbay Terminal	H (discontinued 1941)	43rd Street toward Monterey & Colusa
Location

Oakland station was a major intercity railway station which was located in Emeryville, California, intended to serve the nearby cities of Oakland and San Francisco. The station was located at the corner of 40th Street and San Pablo Avenue, adjacent to a Key System interurban stop. It was built by the Atchison, Topeka and Santa Fe Railway when their Valley Division was extended from Richmond. Passengers would transfer to transbay buses here, connecting them to San Francisco.

== History ==
The Santa Fe's original Northern California terminal was Ferry Point. Construction of a high-quality depot was one of the conditions set forth by the city for the ATSF to build through Oakland. It opened on May 16, 1904.

Passenger service was cut back to Richmond after June 15, 1958, ending service at the station.

The station site was sold to developers in 1990 and was rebuilt as a shopping center.
