= Brickyard Cove, Richmond, California =

Coordinates: 37.9088141°N 122.3913605°W

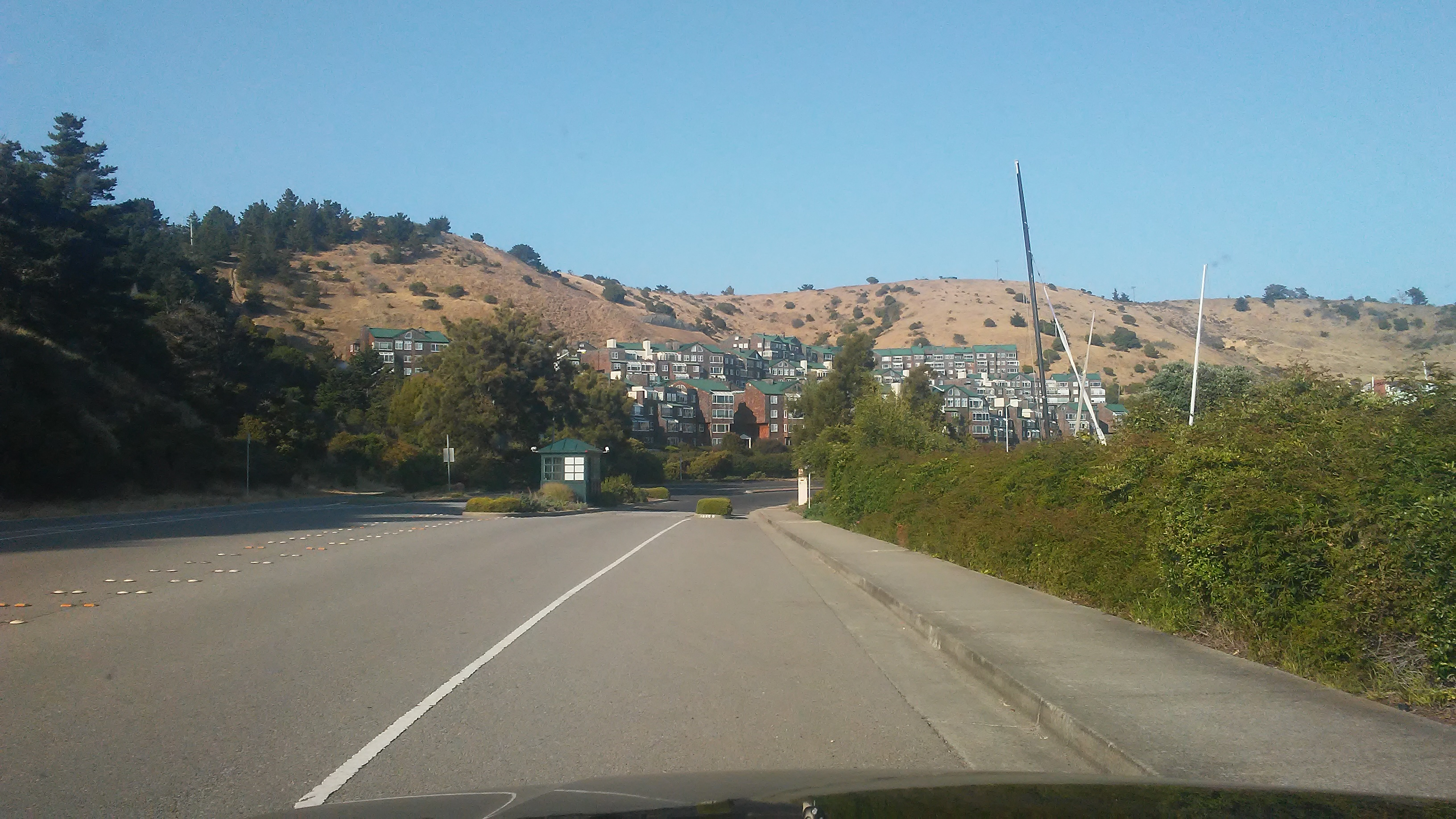
Brickyard Cove as seen from gate

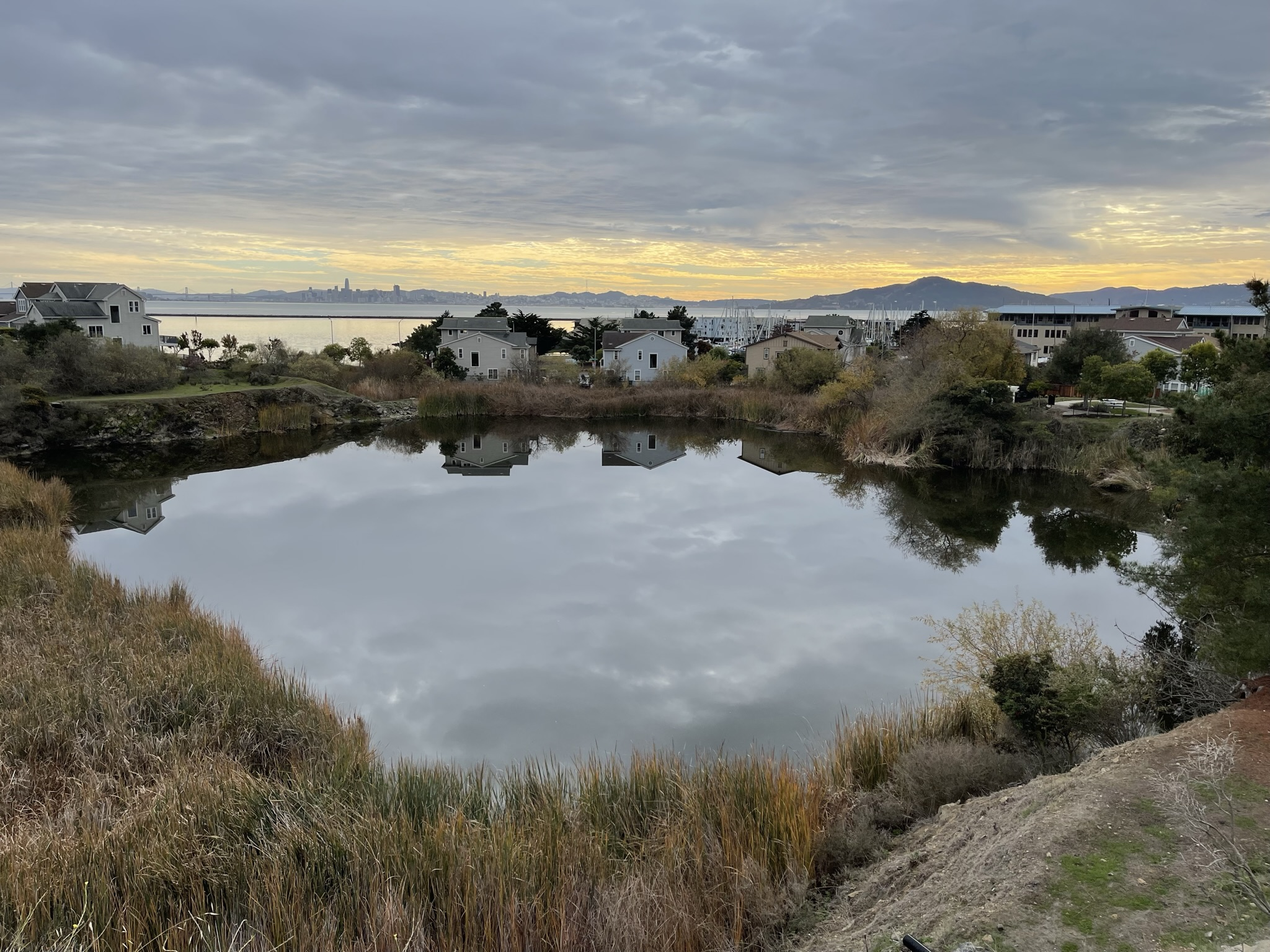
Brickyard Cove Pond, with San Francisco Bay and yacht club in background

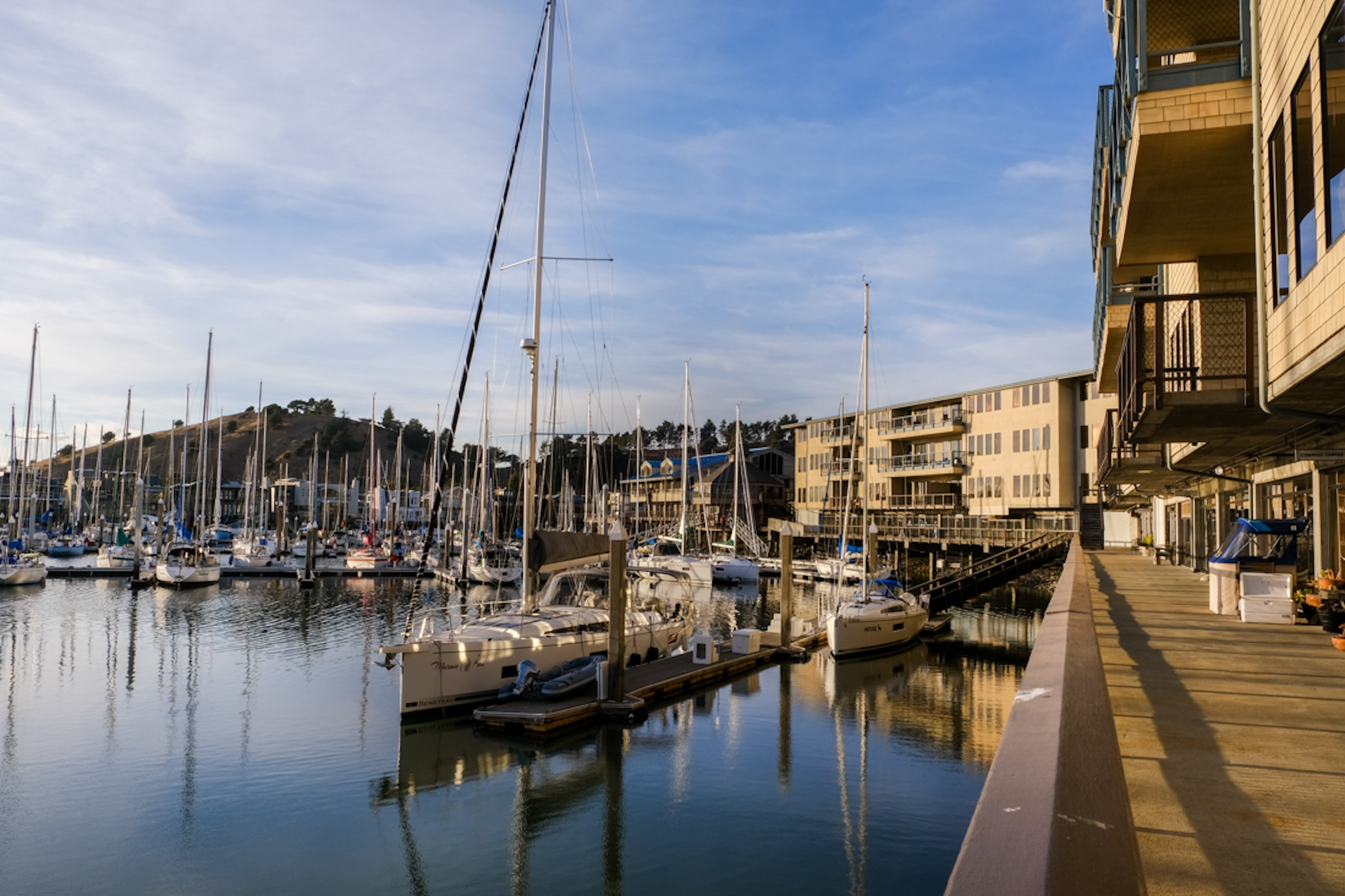
The Brickyard Marina in Brickyard Cove

Brickyard Cove is an upscale waterfront neighborhood in Richmond, California.

== History ==
The neighborhood is surrounded by the bluffs of Miller/Knox Regional Shoreline and Keller Beach park. It is adjacent to Point Richmond. The area is subdivided into three main living areas, mostly condominiums terraced into the hills, private houses on stilts along the spits, and luxury tract homes built in the late 2010s. The area includes the Richmond Yacht Club and Brickyard Cove Marina. The area is home to a fishing pier at Ferry Point, which takes its name from the fact that it used to be the car ferry connecting to San Francisco. Passengers ending their journeys on the transcontinental railroad, which terminated in Richmond at Ferry Point, could take a car ferry to San Francisco. One such ferry was called the SS San Pablo, after the bay. There is also a beach, Keller Beach, popular with locals.

The neighborhood is also home to the Golden State Model Railroad Museum, one of the largest model railroad exhibits in the world. Brickyard Cove had AC Transit bus service (line 79) until budget cuts in the early 1990s when a sales tax was not renewed. In the mid 2000s there was controversy over a large condo project at the cove. In 2017 new houses and large condominiums were under construction on former wetlands. The cove is home to Brickyard Cove Pond and The Brickyard Marina.
