= Richmond station (Atchison, Topeka and Santa Fe Railway) =

Former railway station in Richmond, California

Richmond
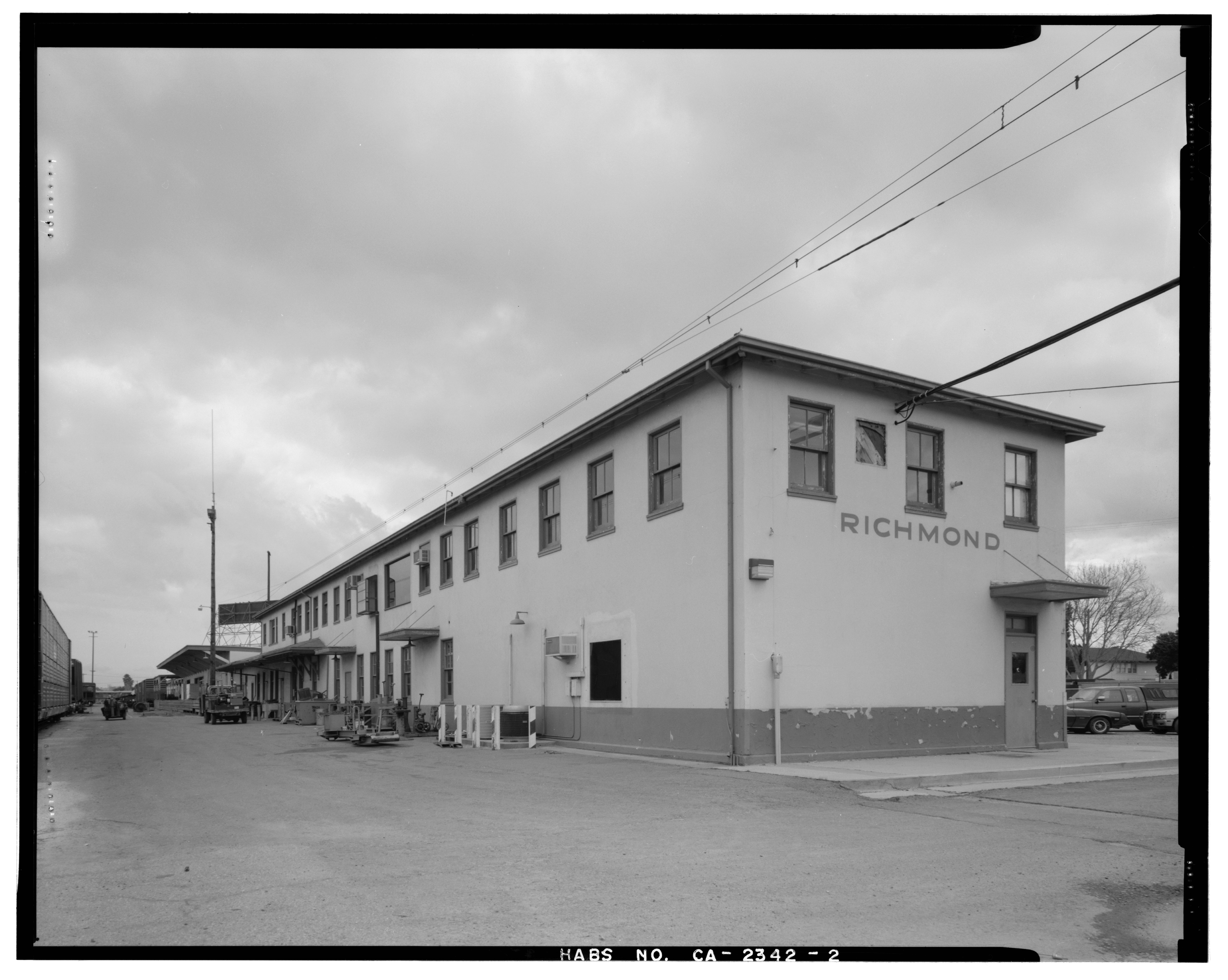
- The former Santa Fe station in 1993

General information
- Location: Richmond, California
- Coordinates: 37.9364°N 122.3738°W
- Owner: Atchison, Topeka and Santa Fe Railway

History
- Opened: c. 1900
- Closed: 1971

Services
Preceding station	Atchison, Topeka and Santa Fe Railway	Following station
Terminus	Valley Division	Pinole toward Barstow
Ferry Point Terminus	Valley Division	Pinole toward Barstow
Berkeley toward Oakland Pier	Valley Division	Pinole toward Barstow
Location

Richmond station was an intercity railway station in Richmond, California. The Atchison, Topeka and Santa Fe Railway opened to Richmond in 1900; service ran until 1971, and the station was demolished in the 1990s. It was the railway's western passenger terminal from 1938 until its closure.

== History ==
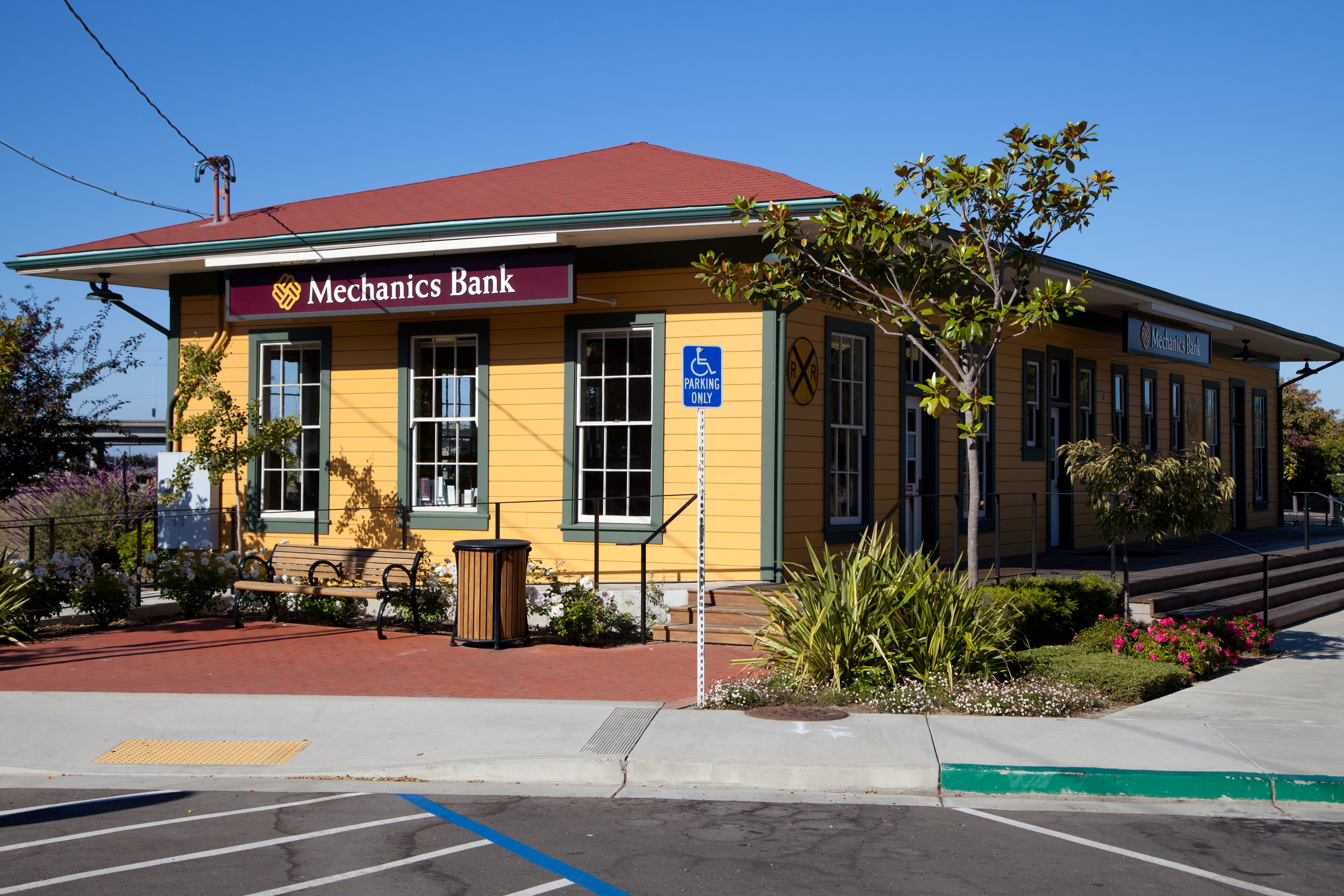
The former reading room in 2012

In 1900, the Atchison, Topeka and Santa Fe Railway (Santa Fe) made Ferry Point on Point Richmond the west terminus of its transcontinental mainline, where passengers could board ferries to San Francisco. A station was soon built at the west end of Macdonald Avenue next to the Santa Fe rail yard. It was a two-story wooden Craftsman style structure with a one-story portico on the southwest side and a one-story freight house on the northeast side. A small reading room for employees (later used as a trainmaster's office) was located nearby. A station was also located at Richmond Avenue in the Point Richmond neighborhood from 1903 to 1918.

On May 16, 1904, the Santa Fe opened a branch line from Richmond to Oakland. Santa Fe trains began connecting with Southern Pacific ferries at the Oakland Mole on April 23, 1933, replacing the Point Richmond passenger ferries, though Ferry Point was used for freight until 1975. (On July 1, 1938, the Santa Fe reverted to its previous Oakland terminal, with buses to San Francisco using the newly opened Bay Bridge.)

During expansion of the Richmond rail yard in 1944, the station and freight house were moved eastward; the portico was replaced with an extension of the station building, which was stuccoed. The Santa Fe branch to Oakland closed on June 15, 1958, leaving Richmond as the transfer point to buses to San Francisco. Santa Fe passenger service to Richmond ended entirely in 1971 when the San Francisco Chief was discontinued.
