= Berkeley station (Atchison, Topeka and Santa Fe Railway) =

Berkeley
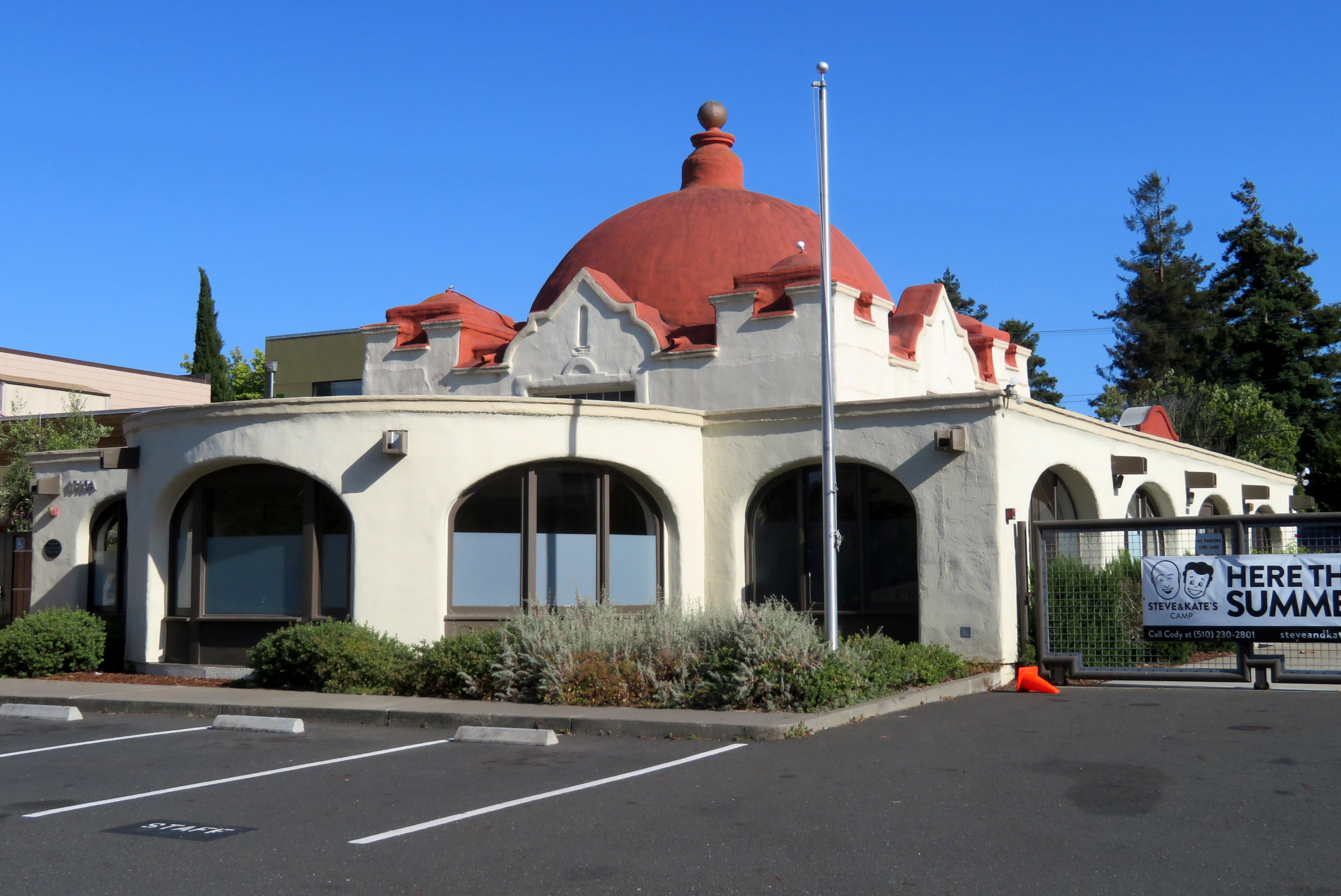
- The former ATSF station in Berkeley, June 2018

General information
- Location: 1310 University Avenue; Berkeley, California
- Coordinates: 37°52′10.94″N 122°17′11.21″W
- Owner: Atchison, Topeka and Santa Fe Railway (1904–1989); Catellus Development Corporation (1989–2001); Berkeley Montessori School (2001–present)

History
- Opened: May 16, 1904
- Closed: June 15, 1958

Former services
Preceding station	Atchison, Topeka and Santa Fe Railway	Following station
Oakland toward Oakland Pier	Valley Division	Richmond toward Barstow
Location

Berkeley station was the name of an Atchison, Topeka and Santa Fe Railway (ATSF) railroad station in Berkeley, California from 1904 to 1958. It is located on University Avenue between Acton and Chestnut Streets. The station building is today occupied by The Berkeley School.

The station opened on May 16, 1904 as the ATSF was extended from its previous terminus in Richmond to a new end of the line at the Oakland depot (actually located in Emeryville) over the former California and Nevada Railroad. Passenger train operations between Oakland and Richmond ceased after June 15, 1958, but the depot continued in service until about the mid 1960s with Santa Fe bus service connecting to the trains at Richmond.

The city of Berkeley acquired the railroad's right of way within the city limits in 1978, but the Berkeley depot was retained by ATSF. The station building was then converted to a restaurant called the Santa Fe Bar and Grill and functioned in that capacity until 2000. In 2001, it was purchased by the Berkeley Montessori School and redeveloped into a private school. That same year, the building was designated a City of Berkeley Landmark. While the adjacent railbed was removed soon after the city's purchase, the replacement linear park and rail trail did not open until 2013.
