= Brickyard Cove Pond =

Lake in the state of California, United States

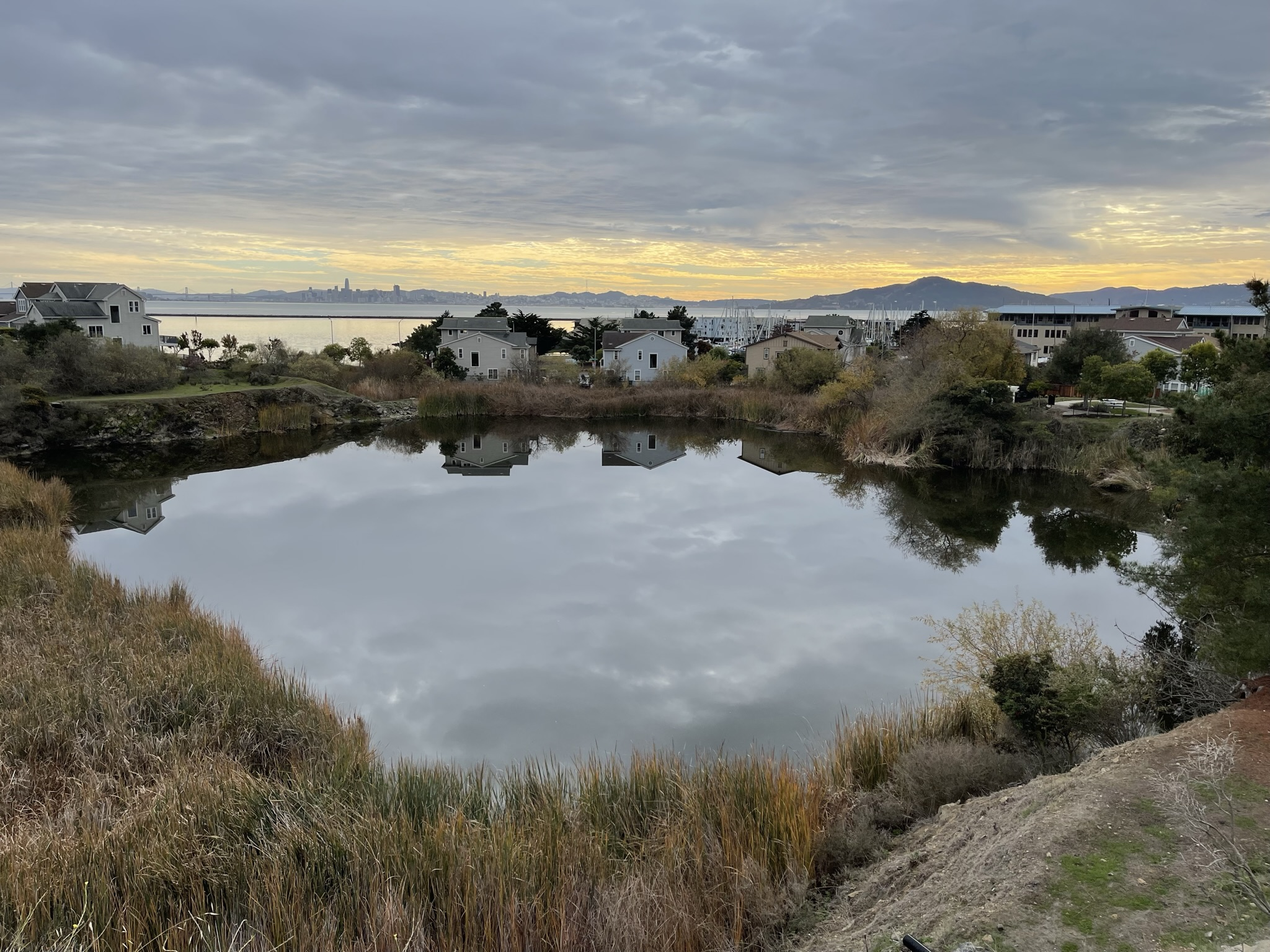
- brickyard cove pond with San Francisco and angel island in the background

- Location within California Location within the United States
- Location: Brickyard Cove District, Richmond, California
- Coordinates: 37.9105°N 122.3763°W
- Primary inflows: unnamed spring
- Basin countries: United States

Brickyard Cove Pond is a small lake in the Brickyard Cove District of Richmond, California. It was formed from quarrying of Nicholl's Knob the surrounding hill. It is fed by Brickyard Springs, a series of underground springs. Before the early 20th Century it was a swimming pond for local boys who often went skinny dipping at the lake. However this ceased when local cattle ranchers began dumping manure in the pond. Right next door to The Brickyard Marina.

== See also ==
- List of lakes in California
- List of lakes in the San Francisco Bay Area
