= Miller/Knox Regional Shoreline =

Bayside park

Coordinates: 37.916°N 122.385°W

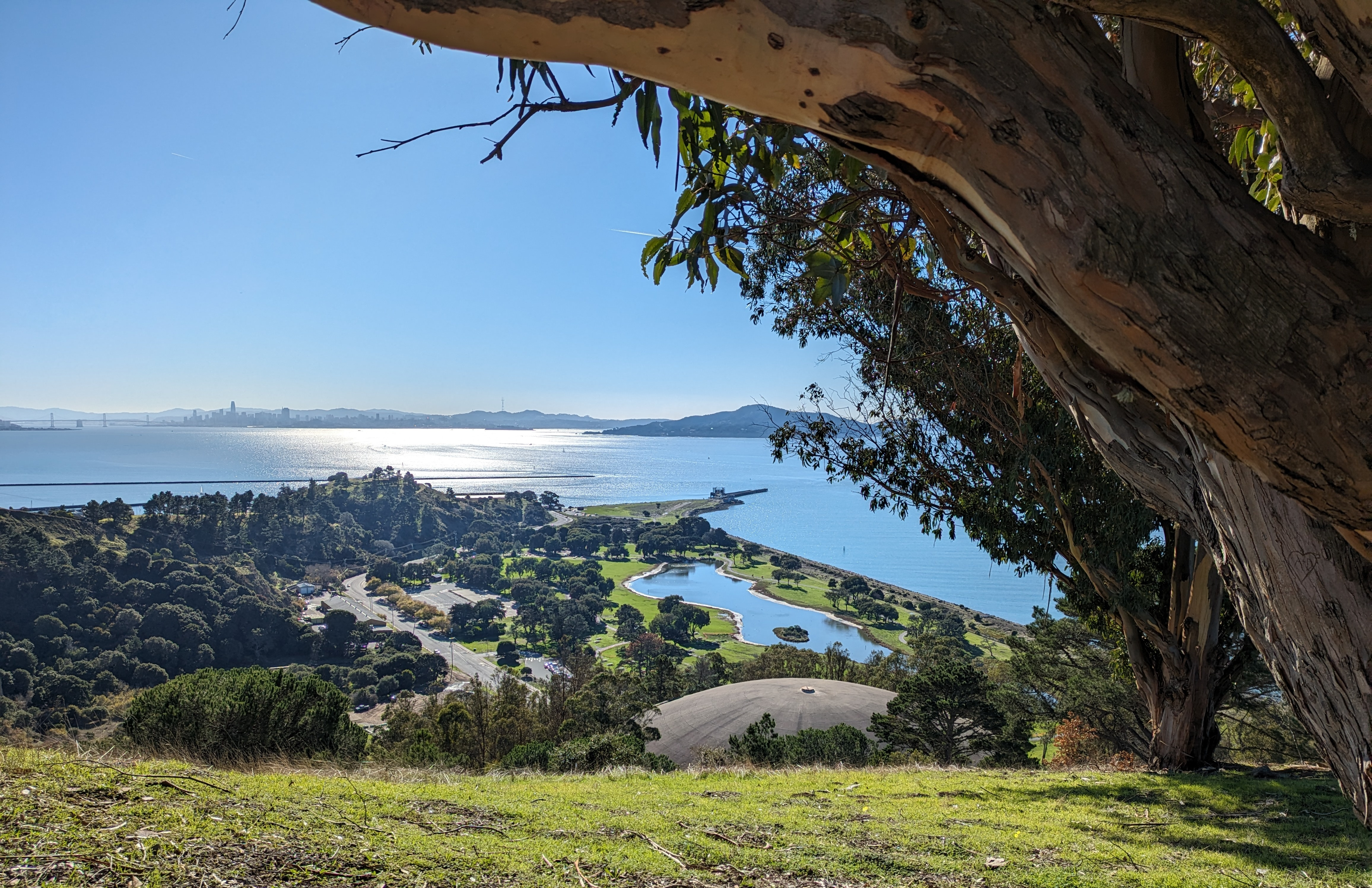
View from Nicholl Knob

Miller/Knox Regional Shoreline is a 295-acre (1.19 km^{2}) bayside park near the Brickyard Cove neighborhood of the Point Richmond District in Richmond, California.

== Overview ==
The park is centered on the Miller/Knox lagoon which is depicted on a large 200 foot by 50 foot mural at the Richmond Municipal Natatorium nearby. The park affords panoramic views of the Bay Area especially the Oakland and San Francisco skylines, islands, bridges, and the North Bay mountains. The views are the farthest from the park's high point: Nicholls Knob. The regional shoreline includes Keller Beach on San Pablo Bay in addition to large picnic and barbecue areas, parking and a fishing pier. There is also a former train ferry pier at Ferry Point and other assorted ruins. The park is also home to the Golden State Model Railroad Museum.

== History ==
The park is named for former state senator George Miller, Jr. and former State Assembly member and Point Richmond resident John T. Knox.

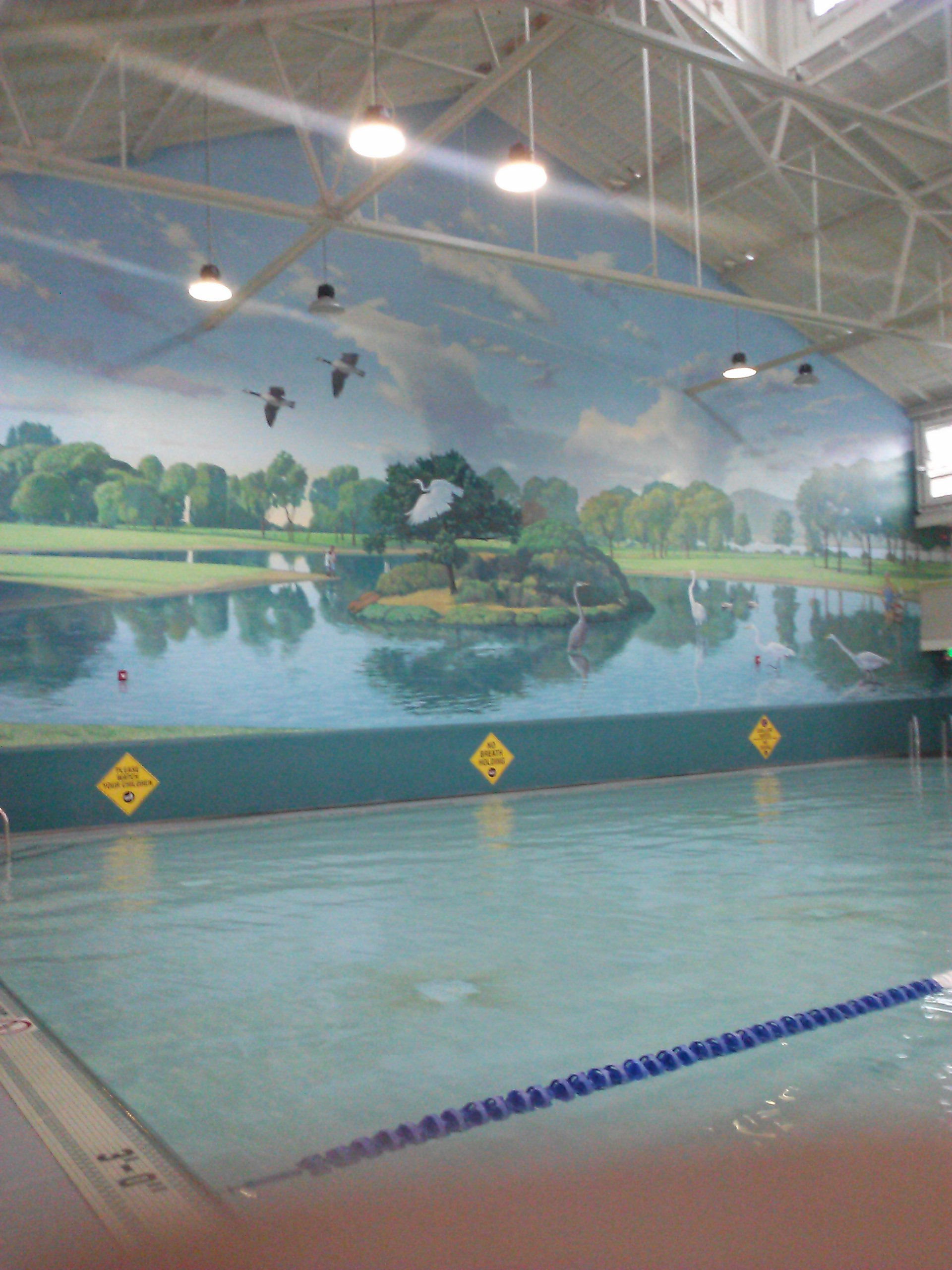
Mural of the lagoon at The Plunge.

The park features many trails for cyclists, dog-walkers, and hikers, and a salt water lagoon where ducks, seagulls, and Canada Geese frolic.

The beach was closed due to a Cosco-Busan oil spill in 2007, but reopened months later.

Miller Knox Park, staging area (December 9, 2006).

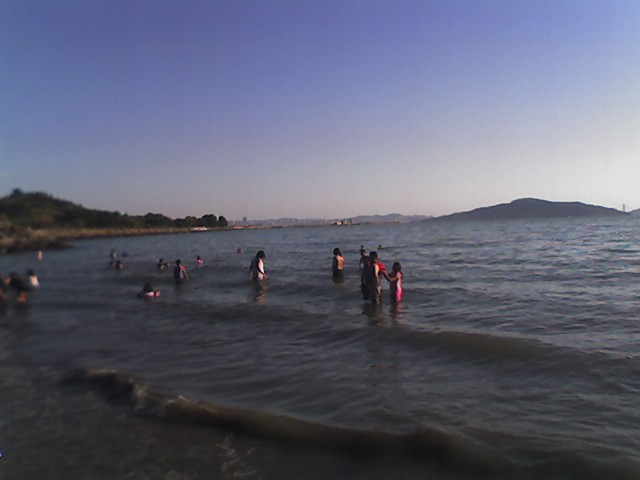
Beachgoers wading on a hot May day at Keller Beach (May 8, 2007).

== See also ==
- List of beaches in California
- List of California state parks
