= Golden State Model Railroad Museum =

Model railroad museum in Point Richmond, California

Coordinates: 37°54′57″N 122°23′0″W

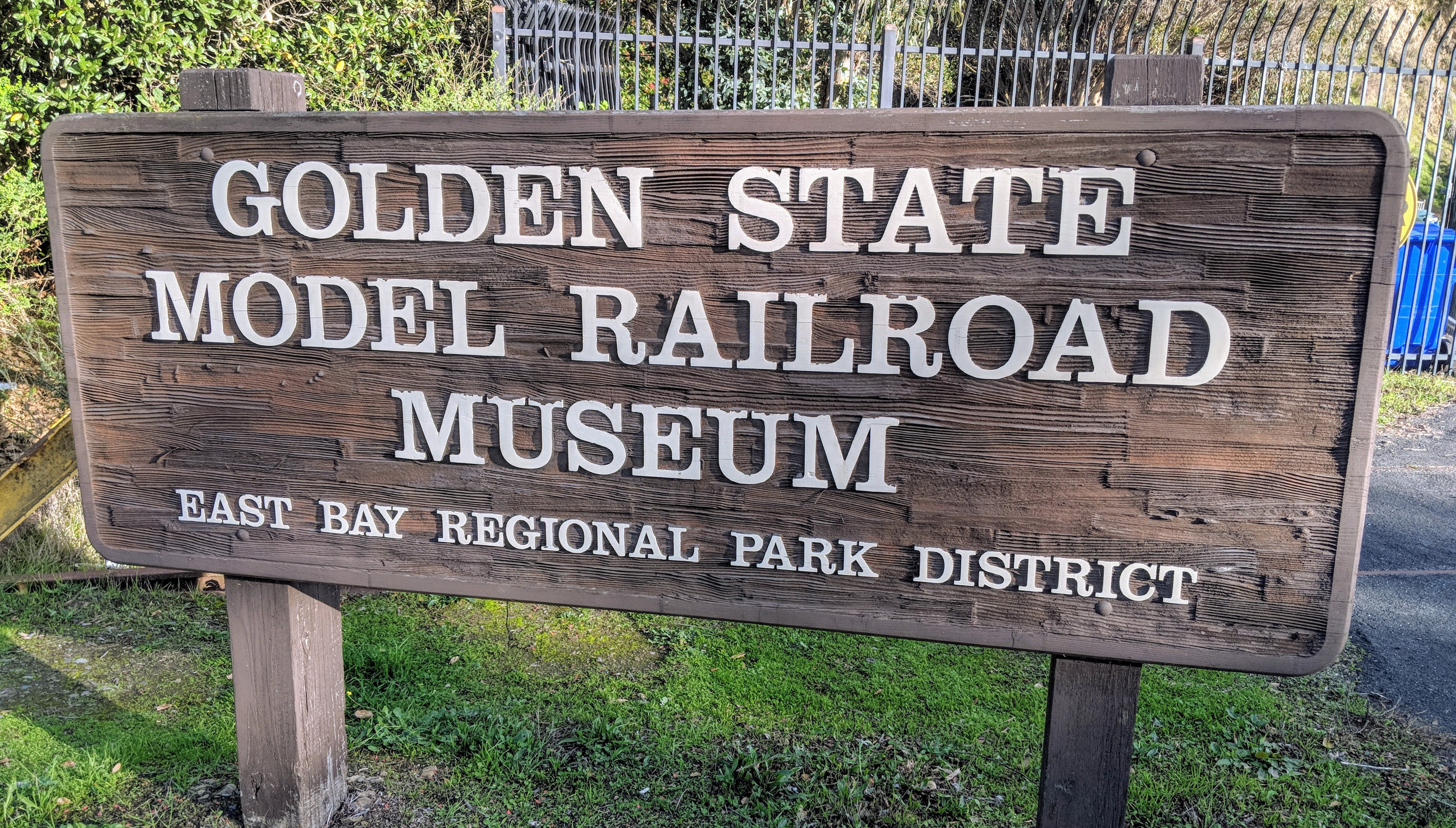
Sign for the Golden State Model Railroad Museum

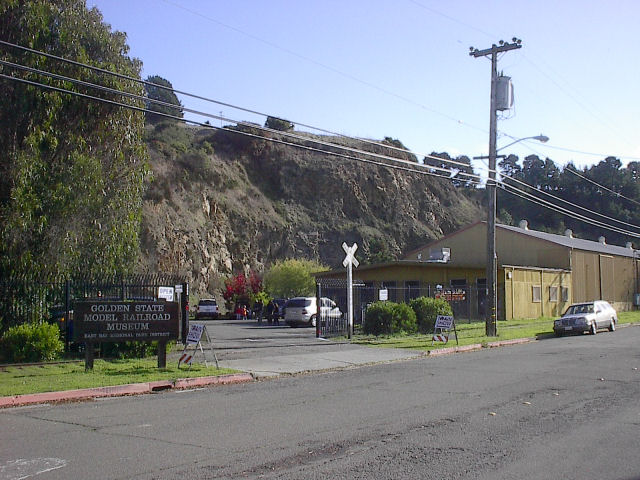
The exterior of the museum

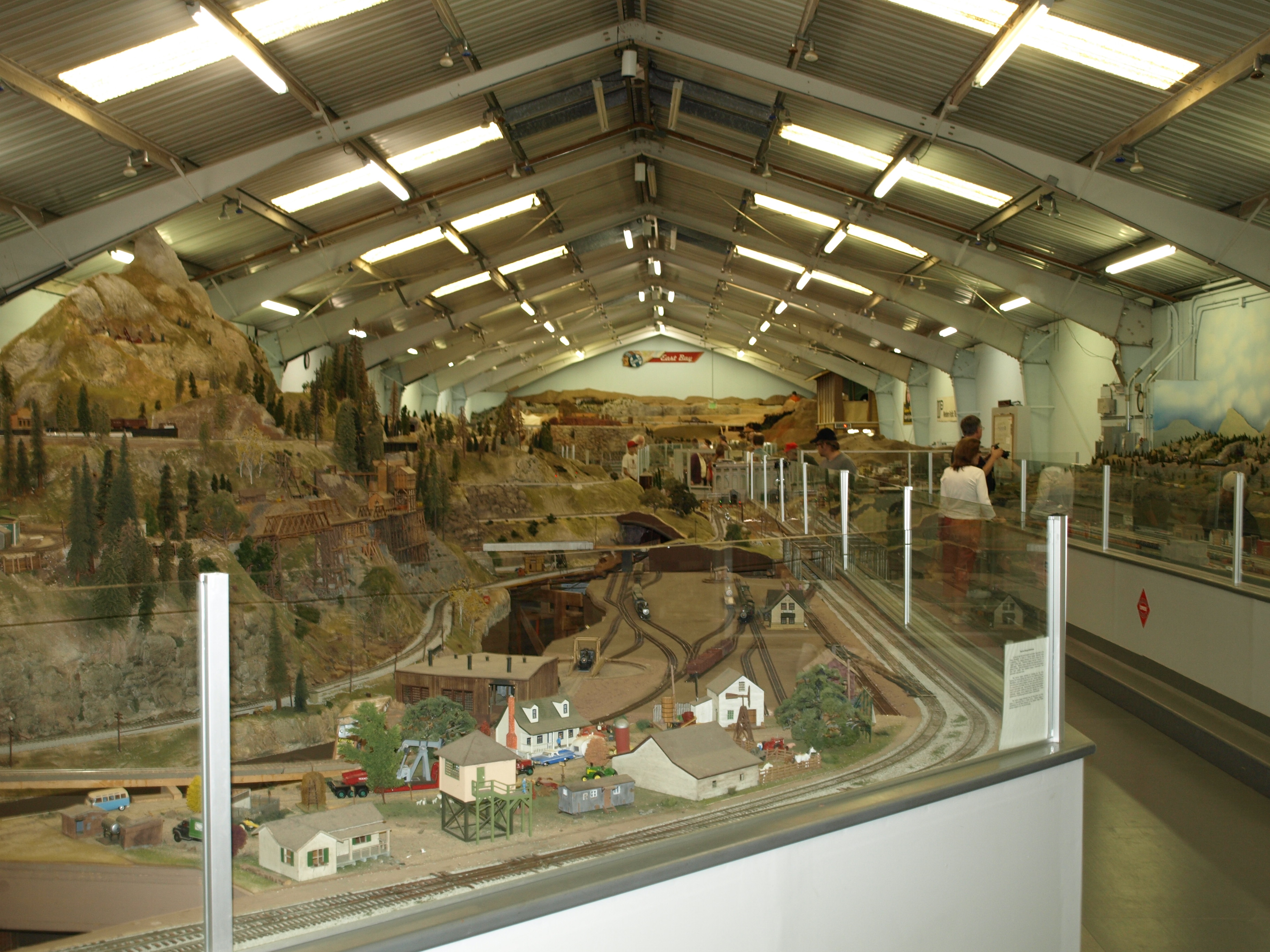
The interior of the museum

The Golden State Model Railroad Museum is an operating model railroad exhibit located in Point Richmond, California, within the boundary of the Miller/Knox Regional Shoreline park. It is located in the Brickyard Cove area and features dozens of realistic city and country scenes, with trains from different eras running on several layouts in different scales. It is on the US National Register of Historic Places.

Previously based in Oakland, the East Bay Model Engineers Society, which builds and operates the layouts in the Museum, was founded in 1933 and is one of the oldest continually operating model railroad clubs in the country. Construction of the museum began in 1986.

The Museum operates models ranging from the steam engines and classic passenger trains to today's modern diesel behemoths and Amtrak passenger trains.

The 10,000 square foot exhibit includes O scale, HO scale and N scale models, replicating many California railroading locations.

Track layouts include historic scenes such as the Oakland Mole, Oakland 16th Street stations ca. 1955, Martinez' John Muir trestle, Tehachapi Loop, Niles Canyon, and Donner Pass.
