= Point Richmond, Richmond, California =

Neighborhood in Richmond, California

Coordinates: 37°55′27″N 122°23′21″W

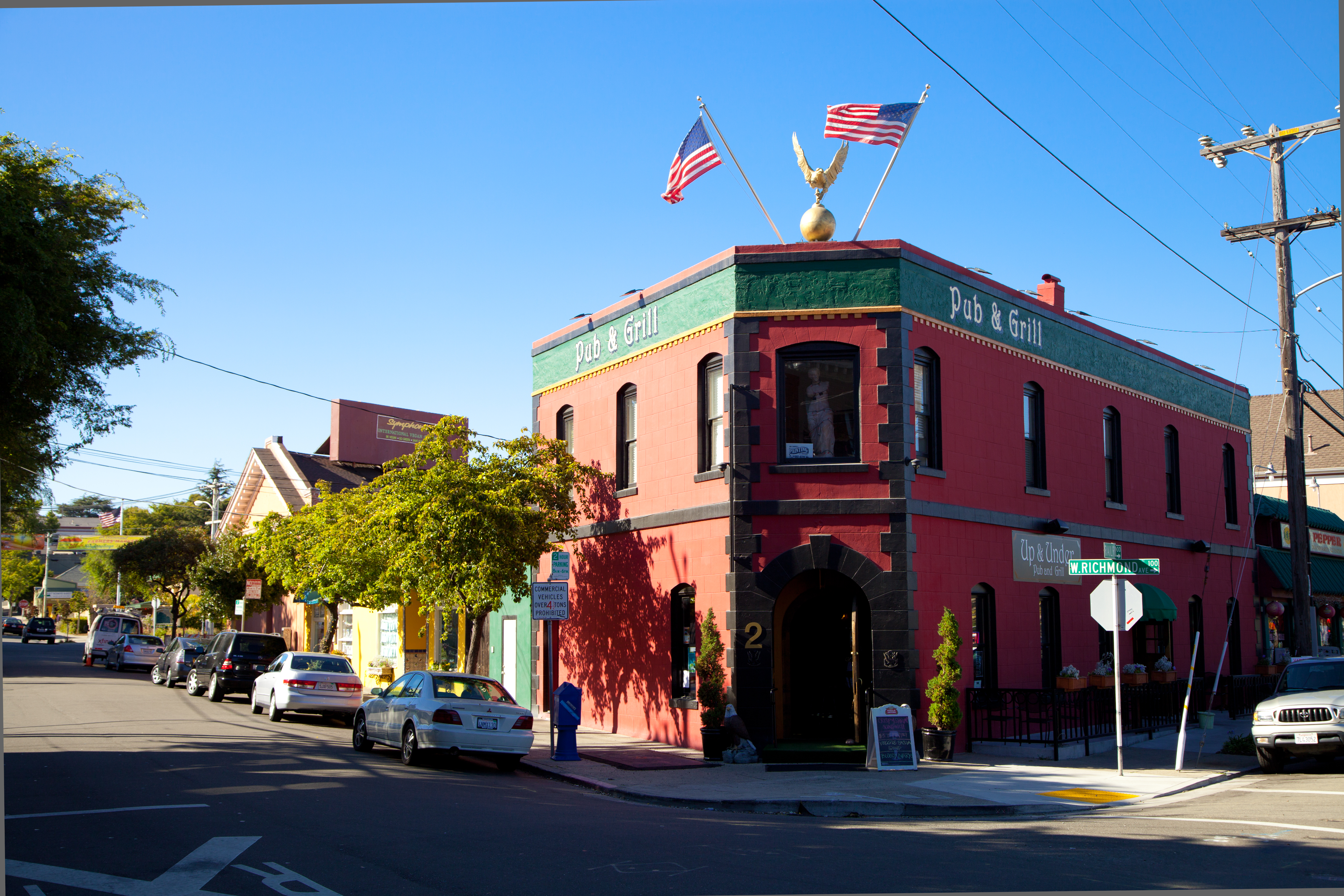
Downtown Point Richmond looking north from West Richmond Avenue.

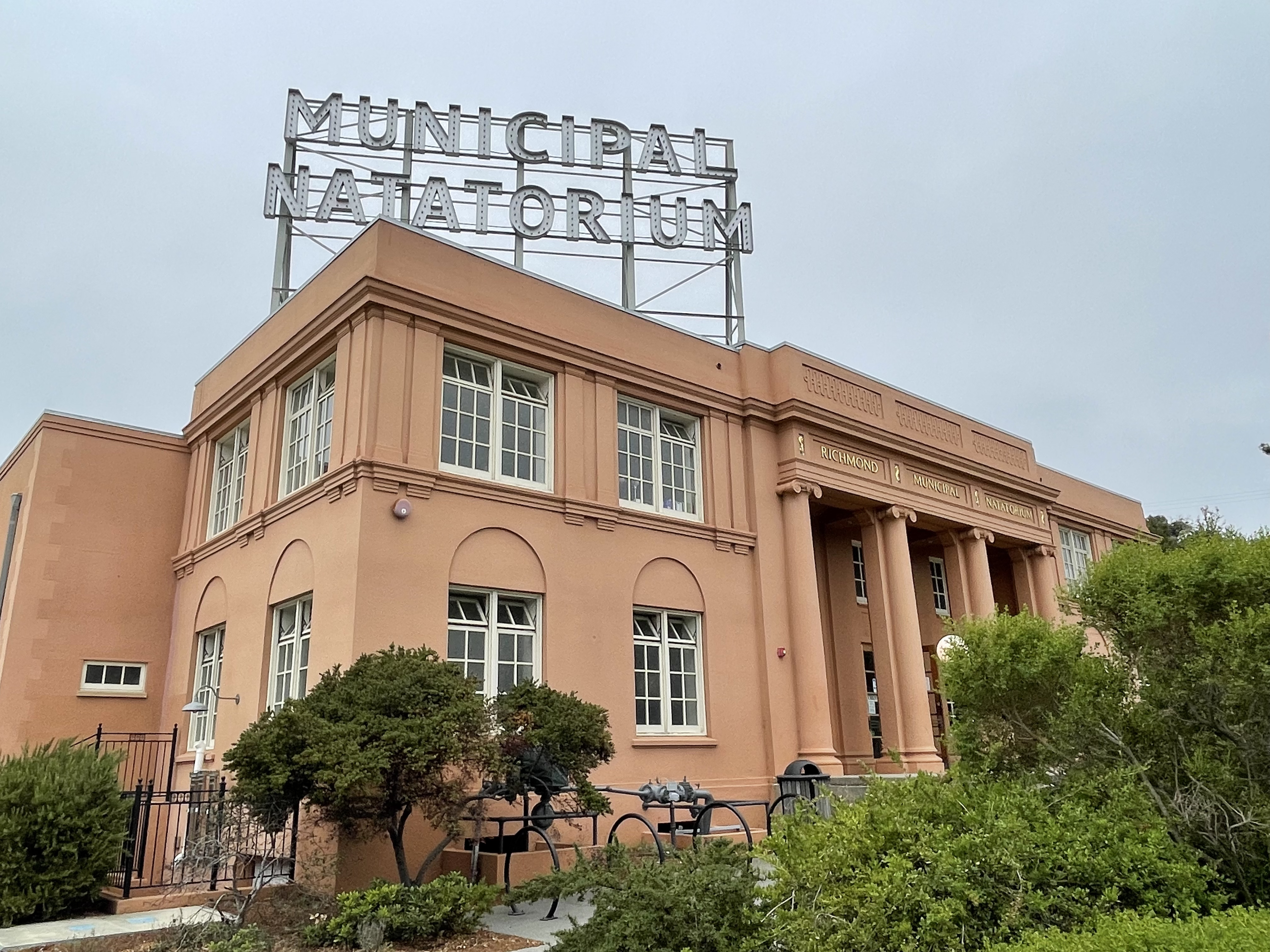
Richmond Plunge

Point Richmond, also sometimes referred to locally as The Point, is a neighborhood in Richmond, California, United States, near the eastern end of the Richmond-San Rafael Bridge, between Interstate 580 and the San Francisco Bay.

== History ==
Originally a tiny village known as East Yards surrounded by abandoned farm lands, Point Richmond was Richmond's central downtown area from the late 19th century until the early 20th century, when the present downtown superseded it as the busiest part of town. Since then, its trademark "mom-and-pop" shops have largely survived. The Point Richmond Historic District has been listed on the National Register of Historic Places since 1978.

The neighborhood is dominated to the north by several industrial operations, including a large Chevron refinery, several smaller chemical manufacturing facilities and an active Burlington Northern Santa Fe freight yard. Long distance freight trains are put together in this yard, largely consisting of container cars and automobile transports loaded from the nearby Port of Richmond, as well as some brought up from the Port of Oakland. The 24-hour operations of the switch engines are a constant feature of life in the Point. Residents have a love-hate relationship with the trains, pushing the railroad to modify operations to make them quieter and less disruptive to traffic but also fighting to save the wig wag signals when BNSF made plans to remove them. The wig wag signals, while no longer operating (newer gates, red lights and bells have been installed at the crossing), are one of only a handful still in existence nationwide.

The neighborhood is divided by a ridge, which separates it into a "Bay side" and a "town side." Many houses, which include historic Victorians, offer a view of the bay. Many of the area businesses are housed in century-old buildings dating back to before the founding or incorporation of the town.

Downtown Point Richmond

== Attractions ==
The Plunge is a local landmark swim center, reopened in August 2010 after a seismic upgrade and remodeling. The nearby hill is Nicholl Knob, which is part of the Miller/Knox Regional Shoreline. In the historic downtown section there is the Point Richmond History Association museum, a small museum of photos and artifacts that are dedicated to local history. There is a tunnel through this hill named the Ferry Point tunnel; Santa Fe Railroad trains would use it to reach Ferry Point and allow passengers to board ferries to complete the trip to San Francisco. Part of the area on the bay side of the tunnel is known as Brickyard Cove owing to the brickyard which used to operate in the area. Point Richmond is home to Keller Beach, one of the several publicly accessible beaches in Richmond, and nearby is a picnic area and parking lot. Across from the picnic area is the Golden State Model Railroad Museum. Continuing along the road is Brickyard Cove a housing development in the area of a former brickyard. Nearby, at the end of Dornan Drive is the S.S. Red Oak Victory ship in former World War II Kaiser Shipyard 3, which is part of the Rosie the Riveter/World War II Home Front National Historical Park; it is a restored Victory ship built in the city during World War II.

== Waterfront ==
Further along lies Brickyard Cove and the Richmond Yacht Club, one of many marinas in the city. There are condominiums and brand new luxury tract homes terraced into the hills as well as homes built over the water on piles along two spits.

Point Richmond's shoreline was the location of a 20-foot (6.1 m) beached gray whale calf in May 2007, the source of considerable odor in the area. After a delay in obtaining permits and disputes over who would pay, the carcass was towed out to sea.

One of the last remaining portions of the channel and marshlands that once separated the island of Point Richmond with the mainland is the Herman Slough Creek in the north end of the neighborhood along with the Santa Rita Channel where the marinas are now located.

== Transportation ==
It is served by AC Transit line 72M, which begins in Jack London Square and terminates in Point Richmond, and by Golden Gate Transit's route 580 to San Rafael Transit Center in Marin County. There was previously shuttle service on line 374 to the Richmond Ferry Terminal until it ceased operations in 2001. In addition to express transbay bus service to the San Francisco Transbay Terminal along route LD, there was also service directly to El Cerrito del Norte BART from Point Richmond and Brickyard Cove on line 79, but these routes were removed due to funding cuts.

== Controversies ==
There was controversy in 2002 over a proposed and eventually built Starbucks coffeehouse in the neighborhood. Some residents feared that the opening of a corporate chain store would dampen a much loved way of life and cherished independent "mom and pop" commercial sector. Nevertheless, an Extreme Pizza also operates in the commercial strip, but in 2011 the community lobbied for a moratorium or ban on chains when Subway attempted to open a franchise. Starbucks closed in November 2020 along with a few other local businesses amid pandemic difficulties.

There was considerable neighborhood opposition to the relocation of the Point Richmond library in 2007 when it was to be remodeled and reopened (it had been closed since 2004 due to budget issues). Instead, the city's planning commission wanted to tear it down and move it to nearby rental space so that the surrounding empty lot could be turned into a lively town square. Approximately half of the Point Richmond residents vehemently rejected this and the committee dropped its plans. Still, a lot of the residents would like to tear down the building and move the library into one of the many empty office buildings. However, the nasty fight from the first attempt is still in clear vision to even discuss this matter effectively.

There was also controversy over a T-Mobile cellular tower that was installed on Water Street atop an apartment building. A group of Point Richmond residents claimed the property owners did this without proper public notice. In December 2009, the First District Court of Appeal rejected the protesters' challenge and upheld the legality of the antenna installation.

== Notable people of Point Richmond ==
- Richard Doell (1923–2008), geophysicist
- Cynthia Tse Kimberlin, ethnomusicologist
- Frankie Neil (1883–1970), boxer
- Hazel Salmi (1893–1986), visual artist, founder of the Richmond Art Center
- Jane Vandenburgh (born 1948), novelist
- Henry Wessel Jr. (1942–2018), photographer and educator
- Warren Winkelstein (1922–2012), epidemiologist
