= Point Richmond Historic District =

Historic district in California, United States

- U.S. National Register of Historic Places
- U.S. Historic district
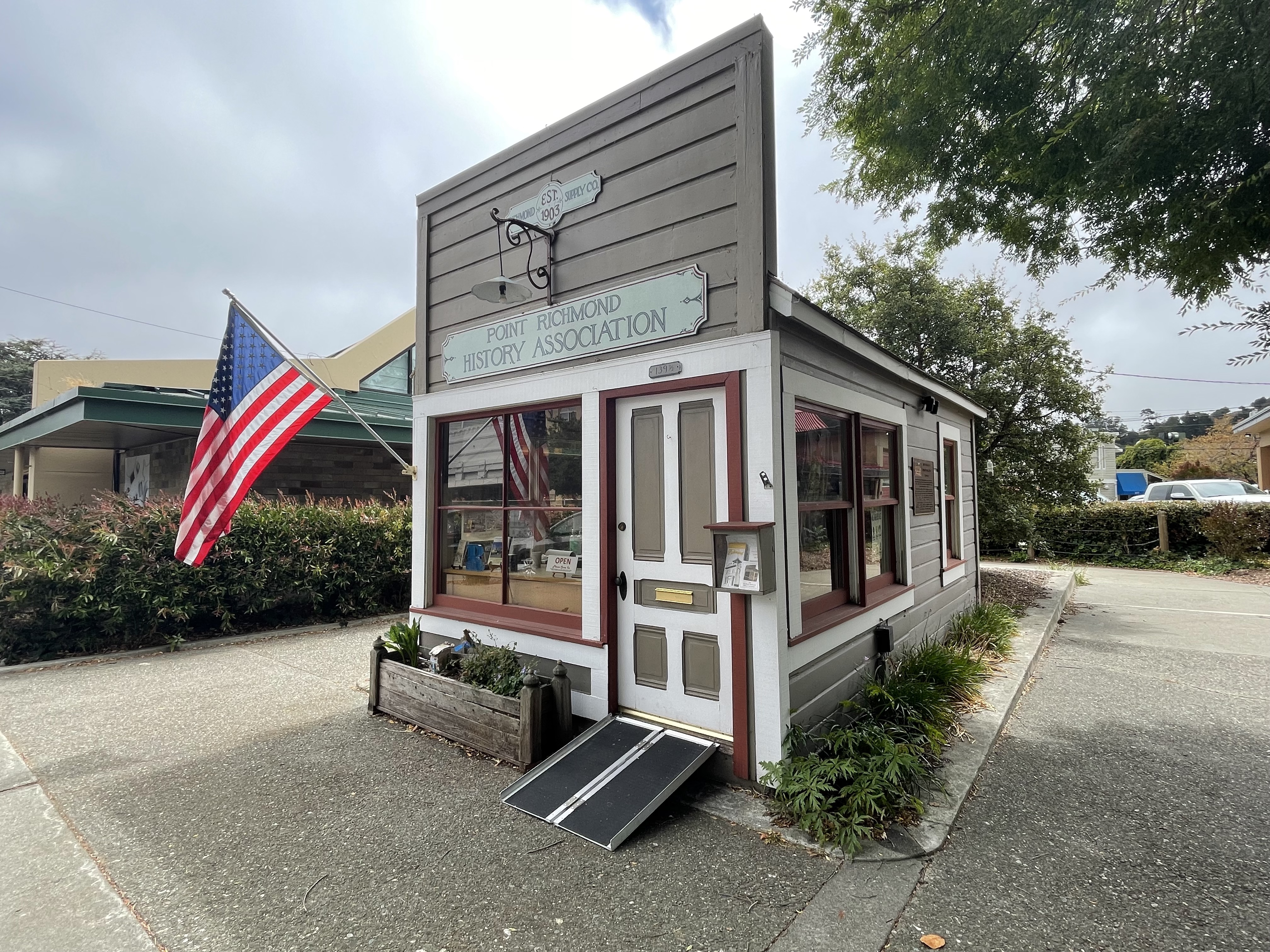
- The Point Richmond History Museum in a historic 20th-century building in the Point Richmond Historic District.

- Location within San Francisco Bay Area Location within California Location within the United States
- Nearest city: Richmond, California
- Coordinates: 37°55′34″N 122°23′7″W
- Built: 1905
- Architect: Multiple
- Architectural style: Bungalow/Craftsman, Queen Anne, Neo-Classic Row House
- NRHP reference No.: 79000472
- Added to NRHP: November 5, 1979

The Point Richmond Historic District is the downtown area of Point Richmond in Richmond, California. It has been listed as a historic district on the National Register of Historic Places since November 5, 1979, for architecture and historical significance.

== History ==
This historic district developed in the late 1890s when the San Francisco and San Joaquin Valley Railway occupied 57 acres (230,000 m^{2}) of land in the area that is now the neighborhood downtown of Point Richmond. The acres were bought by the Santa Fe Railroad upon completion and at the same time the Pacific Coast Oil Company (later Standard Oil, today Chevron) acquired adjacent lands and built an oil refinery. The completion of these projects attracted the first residents to this area.

Point Richmond served as the downtown district of Richmond until the city expanded along the central flatlands of western Contra Costa County during the beginning of the 20th century. This city's expansion led to a larger downtown to the northeast which was exacerbated by tens of thousands of World War II shipbuilding workers. Point Richmond was the terminal of the East Shore & Suburban Railway's Refinery-County Line route; that rail system was a predecessor of the Key System.

== About ==
Today maps are provided by the city of Richmond's Convention and Visitors Bureau for individuals to take walking tours of the historic zone. The historic area is now only a small portion of the larger neighborhood but still serves as the center for neighborhood businesses and civic affairs. There was much controversy regarding the inclusion of a Starbucks café in 2004 as the area had up until that point not had any chain stores. Although many residents opposed the coffee shop, it opened in that same year, and the residents have calmed regarding the subject. The location was later closed in November 2020 due to a sustained decline in business as a result of the 2020 coronavirus pandemic.

The Historic District is accessible from Interstate 580, Richmond Parkway, Macdonald Avenue, Cutting Boulevard. AC Transit bus route 72M MacDonald connects with the Richmond BART and Amtrak Station. Golden Gate Transit routes 40 and 42 connect with the station and Marin County; the former serves del Norte Station.

== See also ==
- National Register of Historic Places listings in Contra Costa County, California
