= Ferry Point, California =

Coordinates: 37.909415°N 122.390578°W

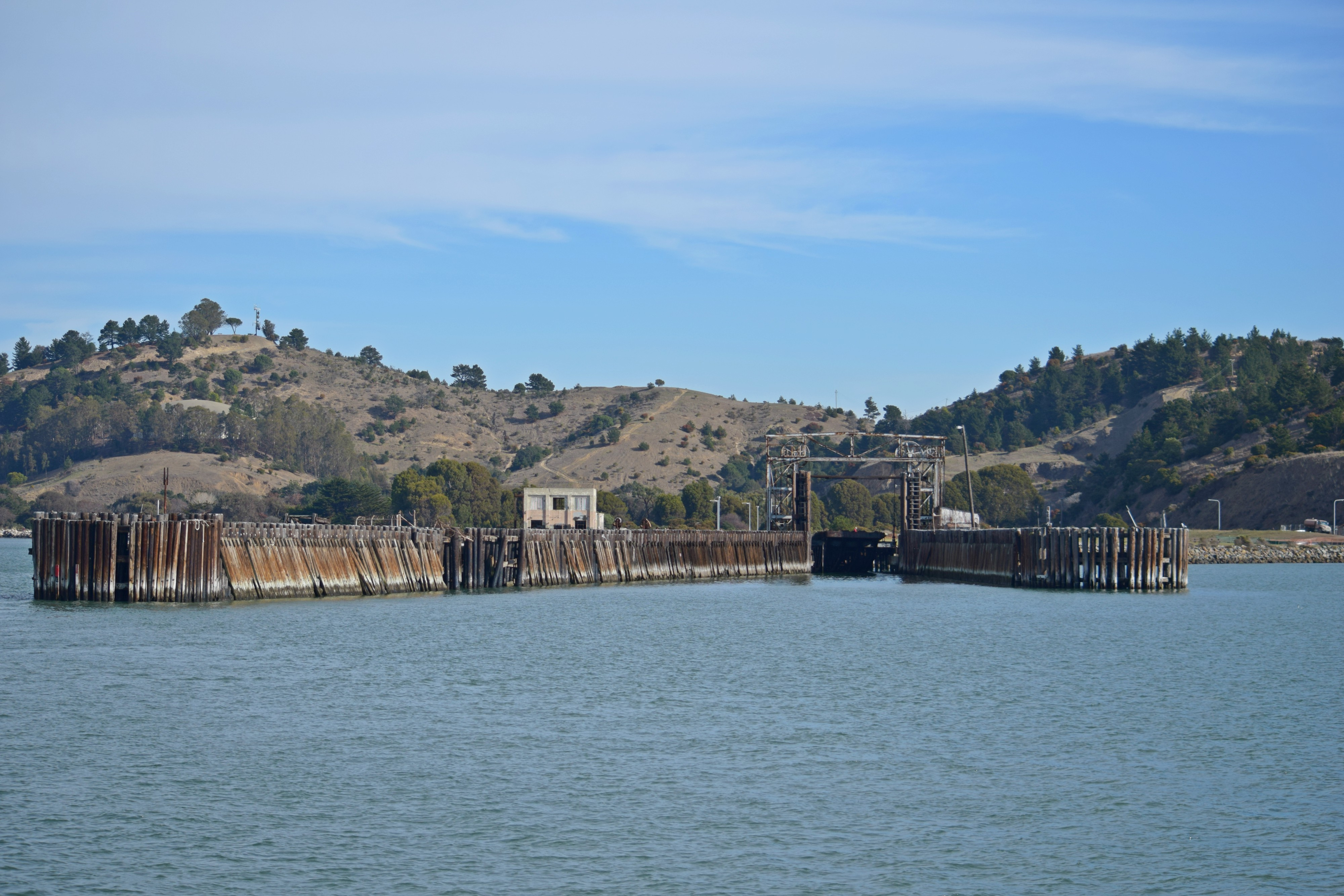
Ruins of the Atchison, Topeka and Santa Fe Railway ferry pier, 2015

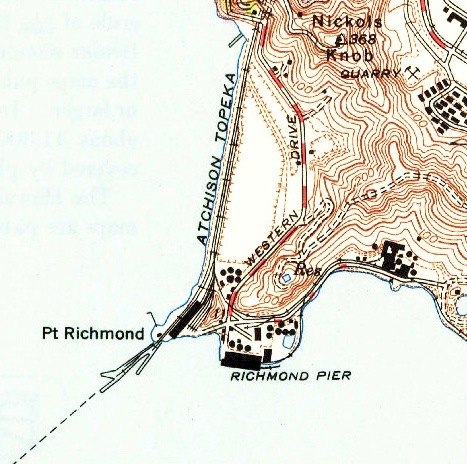
1948 map of Ferry Point, labeled here as Point Richmond

Ferry Point is a cape on the San Francisco Bay in western Richmond, California, United States. Once the Northern California terminal for the Atchison, Topeka and Santa Fe Railway, the area has been developed as a regional park.

== History ==
Ferry Point once served as the western terminus of the Atchison, Topeka and Santa Fe Railway, who constructed the pier in 1900 to facilitate ferry docking to transfer passengers and freight to other locations around the San Francisco Bay. Santa Fe trains began connecting with SP ferries at the Oakland Mole on April 23, 1933, replacing the Point Richmond passenger ferries. Ferry Point continued to be used for freight ferries, as well as troop ferries during World War II. The Port of Richmond gradually replaced Ferry Point, as the port could handle larger freighters. Freight ferries stopped using Ferry Point in 1975, making it the longest-lived of the transcontinental railroad wharves on the bay. The East Bay Regional Park District acquired the railroad right of way in 1991 and the land was incorporated into the Miller/Knox Regional Shoreline.

Ferry Point was initially named Point Richmond, but the area adopted a new descriptor after the nearby neighborhood became more associated with that moniker.

Preceding station	Atchison, Topeka and Santa Fe Railway	Following station
Terminus	Valley Division	Richmond toward Barstow
San Francisco Ferry Building Terminus	Connection to San Francisco via Ferry	Terminus
