= Railroadiana =

Railroad artifacts

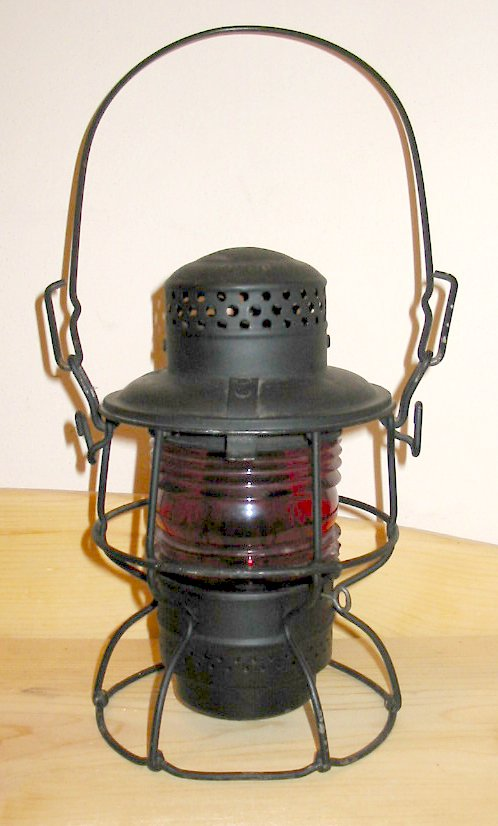
A Brakeman's lantern from the Chicago and North Western Railway. Lanterns like this are a common type of railroadiana.

Railroadiana or railwayana refers to artifacts of currently or formerly operating railways around the world.

== Background ==
Railroadiana/railwayana can include items such as:

- Railway books and magazines
- Model railway locomotives, rolling stock and equipment
- Railway tickets and other associated paraphernalia
- Brakeman's or marker lanterns
- Date nails, rail spikes, or short sections of rail
- Dining car linens, holloware, cutlery, or porcelain
- Locomotive nameplates or builder's plates
- Promotional or advertising materials from railway passenger and freight service
- Public or employee timetables
- Railroad hand tools such as wrenches, shovels, or brakeman's clubs
- Railroad switch stands or keys
- Sleeping car linens
- Station signs and railway signals
- Trackside signs such as mile post markers, whistle posts, or flanger signs
- Train dispatching forms and train orders
- Train horns and whistles

There are many more types of railroadiana available to the collector. Some railroadiana collectors include items in their collections as large as speeders or complete passenger cars.

The majority of pieces forming a collection can be legally obtained, often but not always at low cost, from either surplus or scrap sales from the railroad companies themselves, or through aftermarket railroadiana shows. Highly desirable items (rare or from popular lines) may sell for significant multiples of their original price.

== Gallery ==
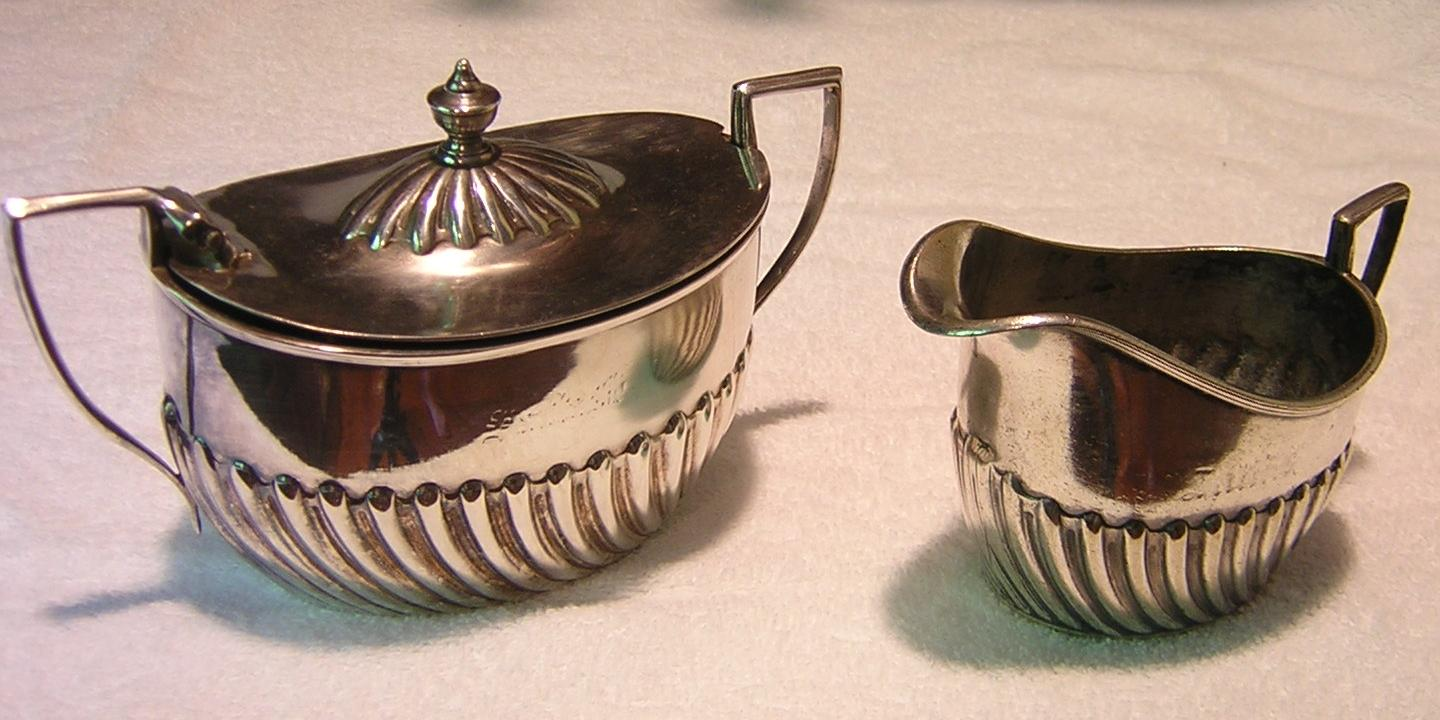
A creamer and sugar bowl used by the Atchison, Topeka and Santa Fe Railway, made by Harrison & Howson for dining car service

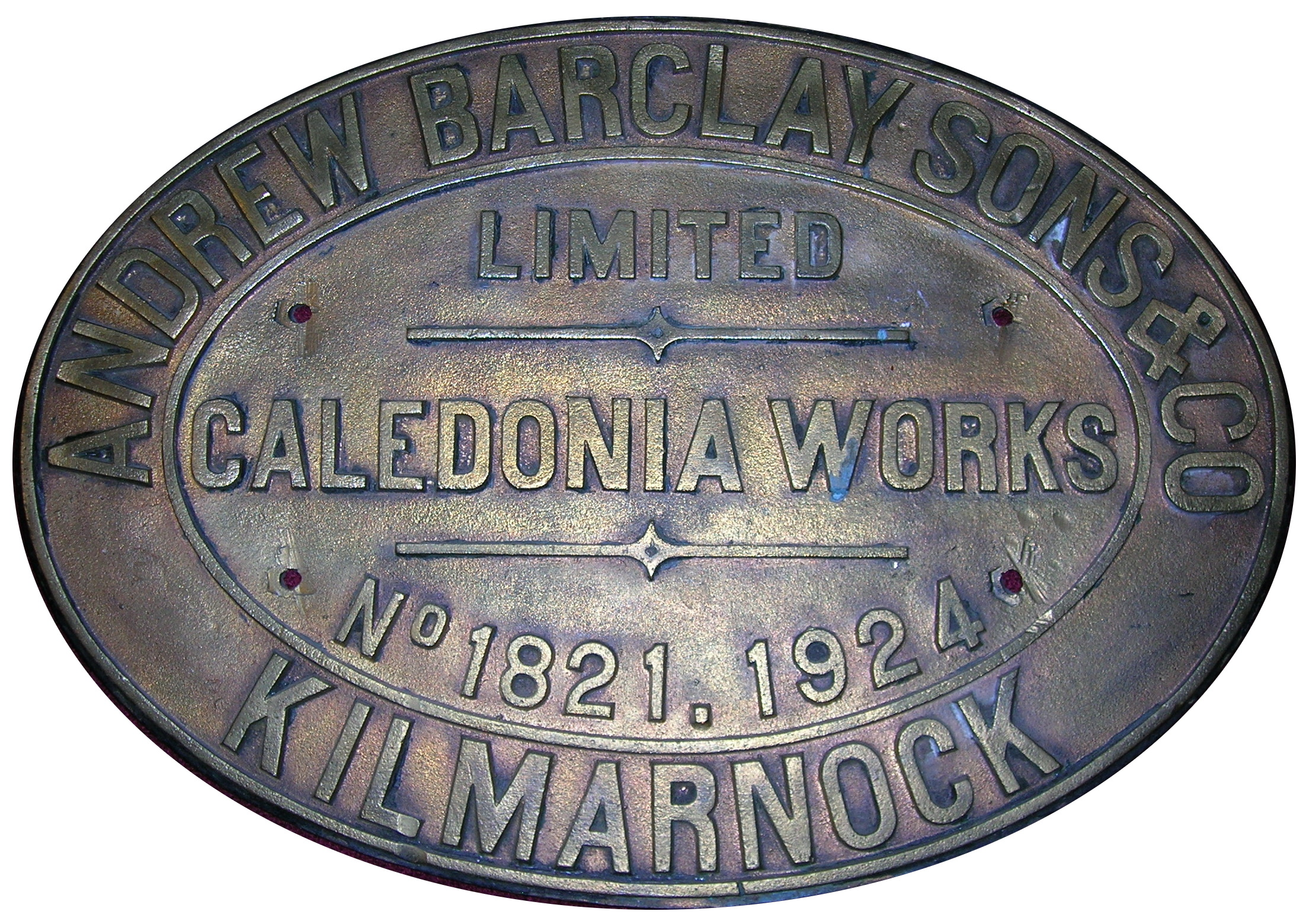
A brass plaque from an Andrew Barclay locomotive of 1925

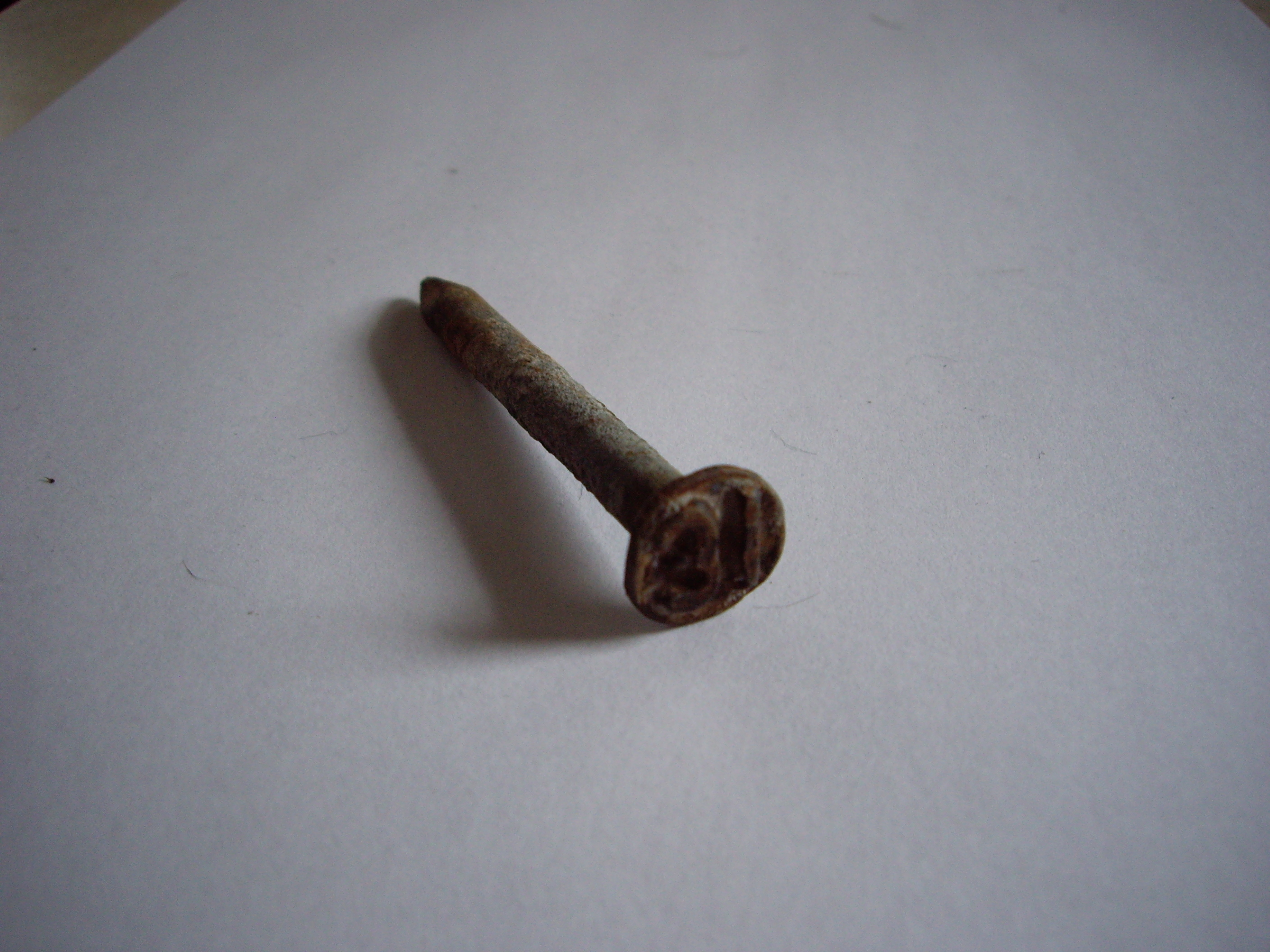
Date Nails where used to mark the year the railroad wood was installed.

A railway signal.

== See also ==
- Private railroad car
- Private railway station
