= Date nail =

Nails marked to identify age

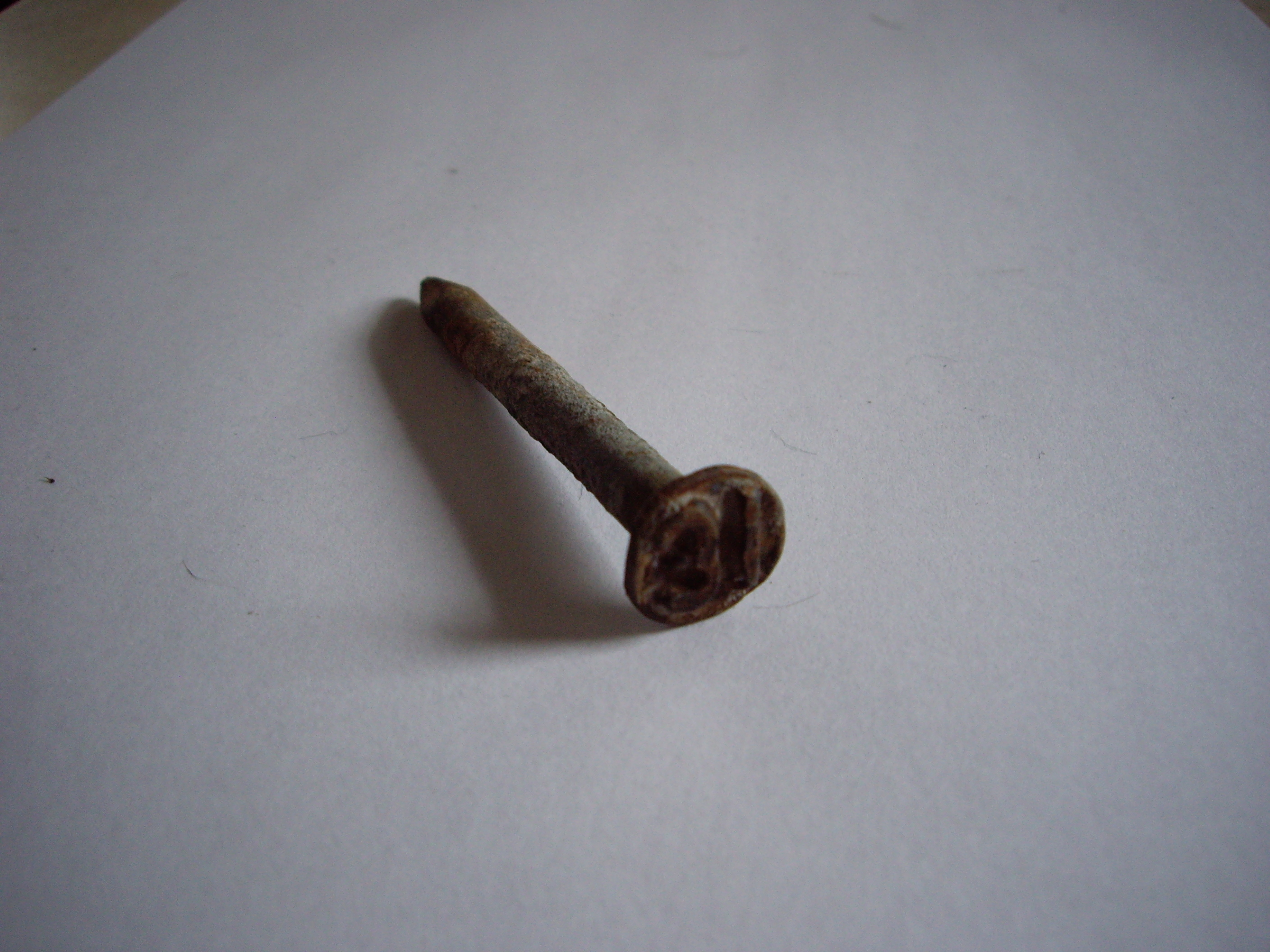
A "31" date nail

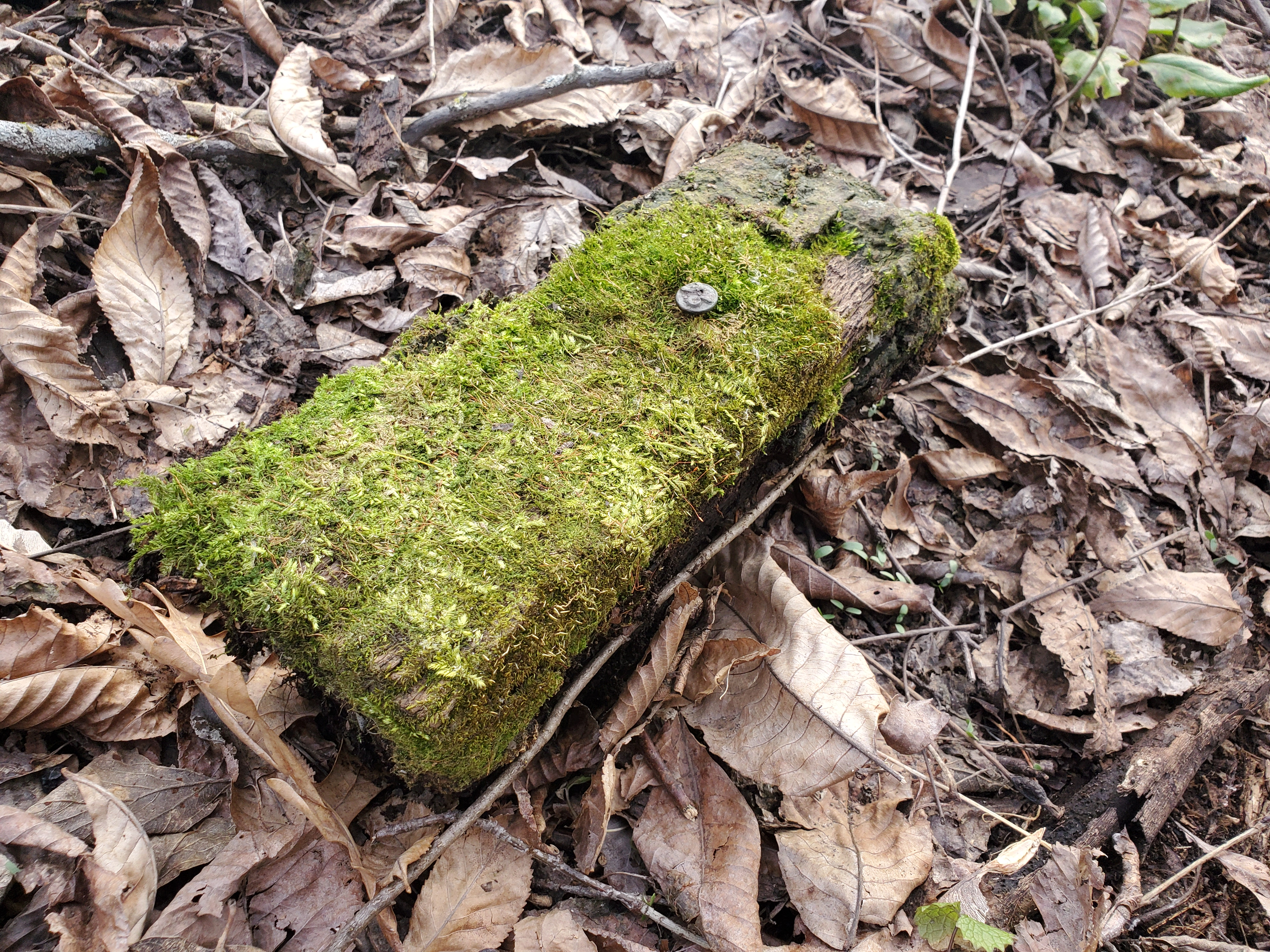
A 1936 Chicago, Milwaukee, St. Paul and Pacific Railroad (Milwaukee Road) date nail in an old tie

Date nails were tagging devices utilized by railroads and utility companies to visually identify the age of railroad ties or utility poles. Octave Chanute, railroad and aviation pioneer, is credited with the idea for using date nails as a way of tracking the life of railroad ties. Different railroads used different sized nails with either alpha or numerical markings. An example would be a Southern Pacific Railroad nail with the marking "01" stamped on the head of the nail. The "01" would identify the nail as being hammered into a railroad tie in the year 1901.

Date nails can vary in size, shape, length, material, and rarity. Some railroads used "code nails" which means that the nail was used to mark something other than the date the tie was installed. An example of a code nail would be the Chicago and North Western Railway "FNB" nail meaning First National Bank, which would be hammered into the ends of some C&NW ties. Another example is the Milwaukee Road "R08" nail, where the "R" is an unknown treatment or type of wood, and the numbers indicate the year it was installed.

Date nail use has dropped dramatically since the mid-20th century and the advent of more modern maintenance of way equipment. Date nails on American railroads were phased out in the 1970s. Ties are no longer marked in this manner in North American practice, and the nails are now sought after by railroadiana collectors. The Southern Railway never used date nails.

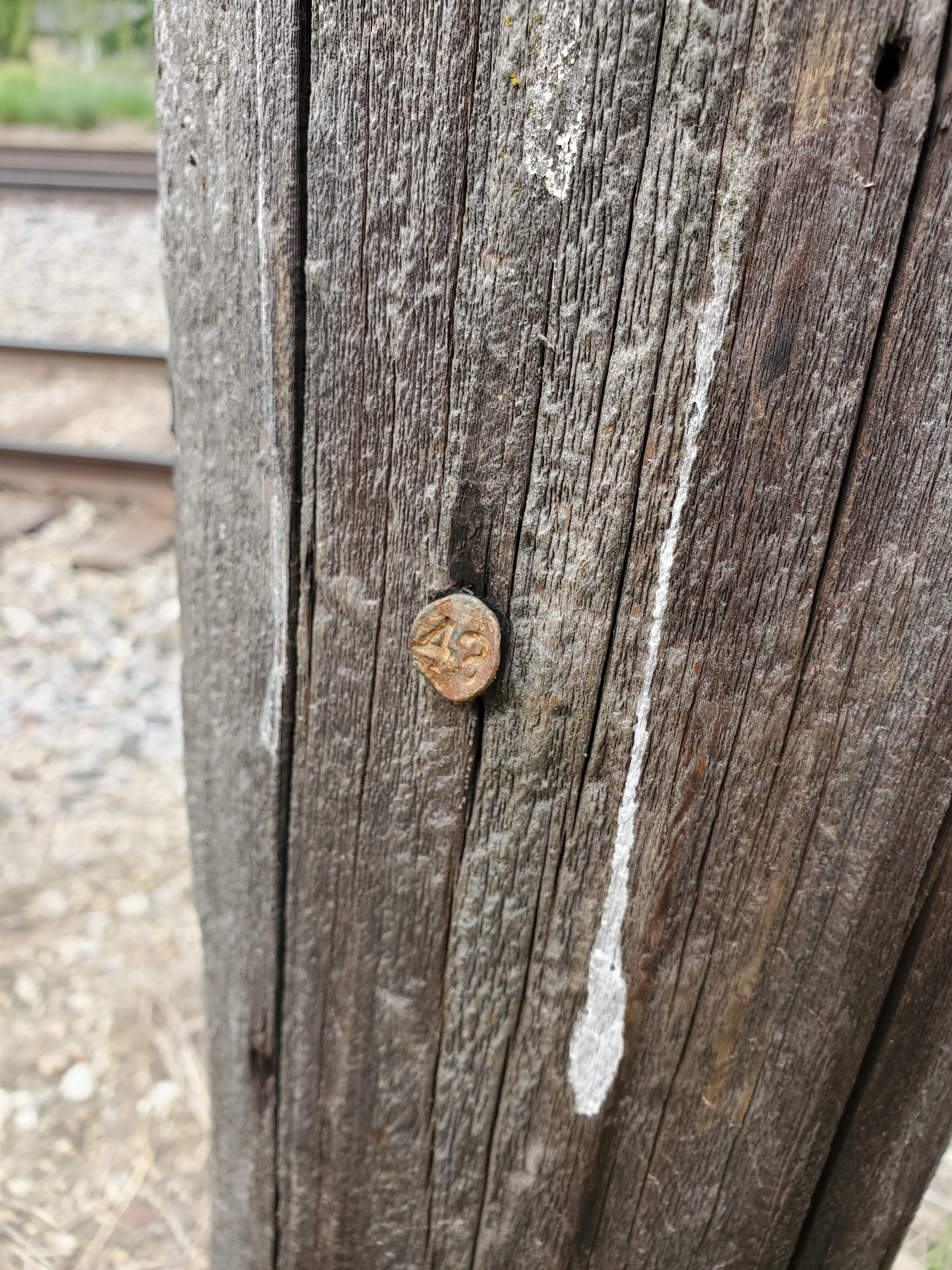
An example of a 1943 date nail in a utility pole

Date nails are also found on utility poles, sometimes in conjunction with a nail showing the height of the pole in feet. The types of nails may have distinguishing characteristics, such as the date nail having raised digits and the "height nail" having incised digits. The pole height will be a multiple of five (e.g., "35" or "40").
