= Nathan Manufacturing =

American manufacturer

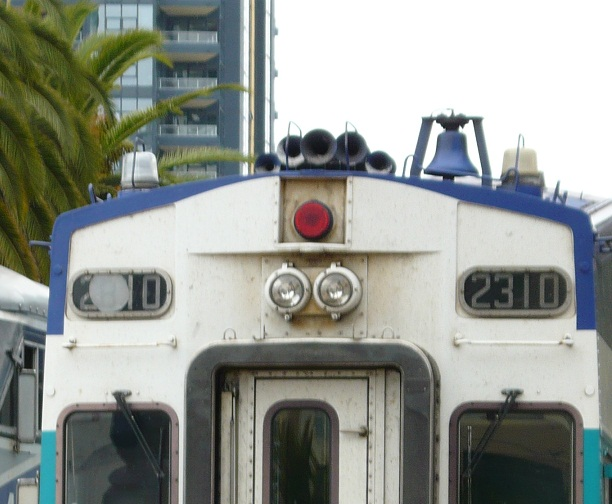
A K5LA (K-5LA) Horn on top of a Coaster San Diego cab car

Nathan Manufacturing, Inc. is a division of Micro Precision Group which manufactures Airchime, Ltd. train horns mainly for North America. It is one of two major train horn manufacturers in the United States, with Leslie Controls, Inc. being the other.

== History ==
Robert Swanson founded Airchime Ltd., beginning by making custom steam whistles in his British Columbia home. He preferred the sound of steam whistles over the single-chime horns made by Leslie and Westinghouse Air Brake Company. In 1949, he introduced the Hexatone H5, of which some odd (88) were made according to Robert Eugene Swanson's personal manufacturing/sales records. The H5 was only preceded by the H6, of which (4), including a cast iron H6 prototype known as the 'Iron Maiden', were only produced and never sold in any quantity to any railroad and were considered experimental. The H-series and N-series, also rare, preceded the M-series manufactured by Nathan in the United States and Airchime Mfg. Co. of Vancouver, B.C., Canada. Airchime Mfg. Co's M3H became the standard 3-chime horn used in Canada. The Holden Co. Ltd. was the Canadian Distributor of Airchime Mfg. Co's locomotive air horns and steam whistles and did not manufacture any horns or whistles, a very common misconception.

Captain Charles Benter, who followed John Philip Sousa as Marine Corps Band conductor, played a role in developing what is called "the most melodic horn in railroading". The five-chime horn Swanson and Bentor came up with became the H5 and H3-series horn, characterized by "short, fat bells that were welded together by their flares, the power chambers not being on an even plane, and copper air tubes supplied air to all five bells from an air-chest below the largest bell. The H3 had three chimes, and the H5 five chimes. This is the horn that Bentor had Swanson modify to A 7th major from C♯ diminished 7th.

The H5 and N3 were evolved into the superior M-series horns. (M standing for "Modulation") Both the 3-chime and the 5-chime had all power chambers on an even plane, and the M5 eliminated the air tubing, instead using a manifold that internally supplied the air to all 5 (or 3) bells. The M5 is still to this day considered by historians and collectors as the most musical of all locomotive air horns. Although supposed to have been originally tuned to A 7th major, 1st inversion with doubled third, few if any M5s ever blew that diatonic chord. M5 bells tended to be varying amounts of hertz off from the diatonic keyboard, just like a chime steam whistle, so about any sound close to various chords could be heard on a healthy M5.

In the early 1950s, Swanson introduced the Nathan Truck Horn in T-E and T-5 versions. In 1953, the truck horn was refined for use on locomotives, becoming the P-series. Swanson, whose Airchime never made the horn, sold the rights to Nathan. He never liked the P-series considering the K-series to be the ultimate horn, with the P (President's whistle) being a cheaper alternative. The P-series did its job, and was easier to repair than the M-series because each M-series bell had a separate diaphragm, while the P-series horns had the same diaphragm for each bell, a practice Leslie was already using. M-series horns also needed more frequent maintenance. The P-series was Nathan Mfg. Co's equivalent to the Leslie SuperTyfon.

All generations of P-series horns "used a steel diaphragm disk. Also, the orifice opened up into a fairly wide, oval-shaped hole in the horn's internal chamber." The second generation P-series diaphragms remained the same stainless steel, however the inlet to the power chamber was now round, due to elimination of the core in the casting pattern. The changes made no difference in the sound.

The P3 was used by the first diesel locomotives of Illinois Central and Southern Pacific. The P5 was used for the passenger trains of Illinois Central, Rock Island and Southern Pacific, along with various freight units, especially those on the old Southern Railway.

In 1954, the K5H/K3H made their debut, using a D♯ minor chord (D♯, F♯, A♯) because of Canadian regulations. "H" stood for "high-pitched" because none of the low-pitched bells available were used. Later, "H" referred to high-profile manifold, while L stood for low-profile. The K5H is Swanson's best yet imitation of a steam train chime whistle, heard at a distance it was described as "unresolved" and "haunting". It was used by BC Rail, Norfolk Southern, CSX (some of whose older engines still use it), and by C&NW. Early K-series horns were sand-cast, like the P-series, but later ones would be die-cast.

In the early 1960s, Nathan introduced the low-profile P3 manifold, replacing a five-chime manifold used previously even though the horn had only three chimes. Southern Railway used this design.

Deane Ellsworth of Amtrak developed the P5a (A for Amtrak) in 1976. While the P5 blew an A7th Major chord, the P5a reverted to Swanson's original C♯ diminished 7th by shortening the #4 bell the same 7/16" that Swanson lengthened the #4 bell on the H5 in 1949 at Bentor's request. Also used by Amtrak was the P01235, with an "0" bell which was an octave lower than the #4 bell it replaced.

In 1975, Deane Ellsworth, who was in charge of locomotive appliances for Amtrak, wanted to bring the superior K5 to America. However, he did not like the D♯ minor 6th of the K5H and personally asked Robert Swanson what could be done. His designer came up with a novel way to lower the pitch of the #3&4 bells to lower their pitch, altering the K5H chord from D♯ minor 6th to B major 6th, and which reminisced of the old M5 chord in structure, but was higher in pitch, which Ellsworth liked. At the same time, Airchime came up with a lower-profile bracket and the new chime was called the K5LA, and it cheery chord has become very popular from the old Chessie system (first user of the K5LA) to Amtrak, Southern and many other roads The K5LA designation included a "K" for the double-diaphragm kettle drum design, an "L" because of its low-profile manifold, and an "A" for American tuning, to differentiate it from Canadian tuning. By the later 1980s, the K5LA was North America's most popular locomotive horn, and today it remains one of the most-used 5-chime horns in the world, surpassed by the K5LLA and the K5HL.

In 1976, Nathan had two other foundries cast P bells, but new castings were used that did not have the right pitches. The 1, 2 and 3 bells had a slightly higher pitch, and the 5 bell a lower pitch. The result was D, F, G♯, A, C, a discordant D minor 7 sharp 11. These horns are considered the third generation P series.

In 2005, Federal Railroad Administration regulations specified a maximum decibel level for horns, resulting in the development of the K5LLA (the extra "L" means low-pitched, with the first bell tuned to middle C) for EMD and K5HL for GE.

== Horns ==
=== K Series ===
==== Single Tone ====
- KSV-1
- KSV-2
- KS-1L
- KS-1
- KS-2
- KS-3B
- KS-3
- KS-3A
- KS-4
- KS-4A
- KS-5

==== Dual Tone ====
- K-12
  - This horn is mainly used on the GT46C-ACe.
- K-13B
  - This horn is mainly used as the rear horn for the SD70ACe-T4.
- K-13
- K-25

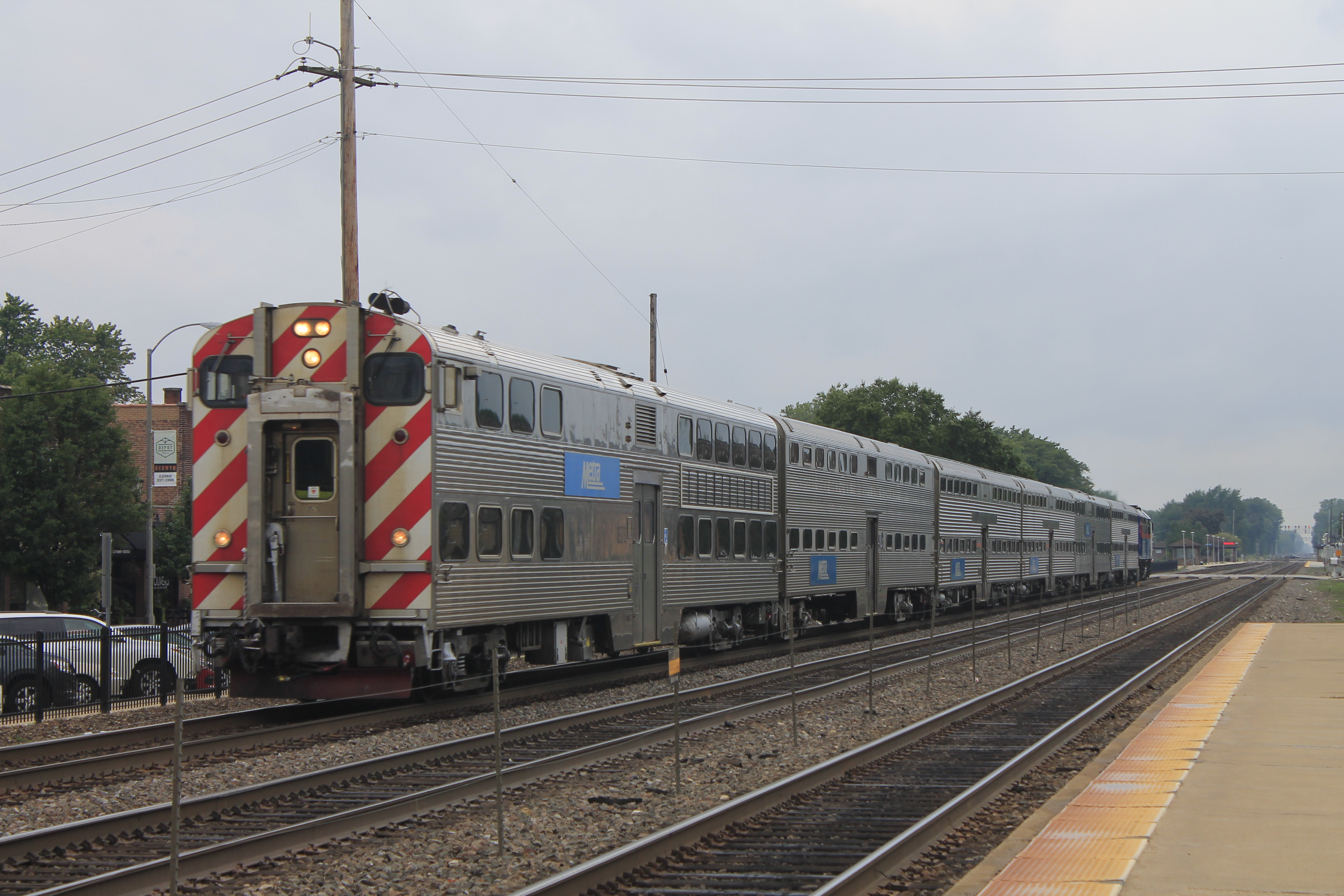
A K3LA (K-3LA) Horn on top of a Metra Cabcar #8579

==== 3 Chime ====
- K-3H
  - One of the most common train horns in Canada, found on Canadian National and CPKC, alongside its low-manifold counterpart, the K3L.
- K-3H-AU-L
- K-3HA-R2
- K-3HAR2-CDF
- K-3L
  - Another common Canadian train horn, also found on Canadian National and CPKC.
- K-3HL
  - found on most UP AC6000/AC44
- K-3LA
  - This horn is most commonly found on Metra's Gallery cab cars, as well as the Highliner II and Silverliner V EMUs. It is also found on several BNSF and Union Pacific locomotives.
- K-3LA-R2
  - A common bell reversal arrangement for a K3LA on BNSF and Union Pacific locomotives.
- K-3LP
  - This horn is most commonly found on KCS's ES44AC units

==== 5 Chime ====
- K-5H
  - The tuning of the original bells are D♯, F♯, A♯, C, and D♯, creating a D♯ Minor 6th, the chord of Swanson's desire due it mimicking the chords that steam whistles would play back then.
- K-5HL-R2
  - This horn is a common use on GEVOs. The chord plays C, D♯, F♯, A♯, and C, a C minor 7 flat 5. The horn is mounted backwards on the locomotive, with the 2 bell only facing forward, and the 4 bells facing backwards.
- K-5HLB
  - A rare K5HL horn with the original 3 bell replaced by a 3B bell playing a semitone lower. The chord is a haunting C diminished 7th.
- K-5H-R24
  - A common bell reversal on a K5H, with bells 1, 3, and 5 facing the front of the locomotive, and the 2 and 4 bells facing the rear.
- K-5L
  - The low-manifold version of the K5H. It plays the same notes as its high-manifold counterpart.
- K-5LA
  - The K5LA five-chime assembly has five bells whose musical chord helps the horn to be heard and lessens complaints. The bells may be reversed for trains that go backwards and help those working at the back of the train hear the horn on the front. The K5LA is the most popular horn in use today, with a B major 6th chord (D♯, F♯, G♯, B, D♯). Though first used by Chessie System, it was developed for Amtrak as a variation on the original K horn, and is the standard horn for Amtrak, CSX, Norfolk Southern, and Illinois Central, as well as most commuter and passenger trains.
- K-5LA-R24
  - This is a common bell reversal arrangement for the K5LA on a Norfolk Southern or CSX locomotive, with the 1, 3A, and 5 bells facing the front of the locomotive, and the 2 and 4A bells facing the rear.
- K-5LL
- K-5LLA-R1L
  - This horn is mainly used on the SD70ACe. The bells are tuned to play C, D♯, F♯, G♯ and B, a dissonant G♯ dominant 7th sharp 9
- K-5LL-WOB
- K-5UL-AU-LS
  - This horn is mainly used on the C44ACi. The chord played is similar to the M5, however the horns are transposed down by a whole tone compared to the K tuning with the exception of the KS-2 bell tuned down only by a semitone. Playing the notes, C♯, F, F♯, A, and C♯, the chord is a dissonant F♯ minor major 7th/hitchcock 7th
- K5-CA-LS
  - This horn is mandated for all Canadian passenger locomotives. Additionally, all newer Bombardier (now Alstom) BiLevel cab cars are factory-equipped with this horn. The horn is configured to run a normal setting with 3 bells, playing a C, D♯, and A, an A diminished chord similar to the chord used on the Leslie S3L/RS3L. In emergencies, the horn will play all 5 bells with the extra 2 playing an A♯ and a B on top, creating a very dissonant sound.

=== P Series ===
==== Single Tone ====
- P0
- P1
- P1A
- P2
- P2A
- P3
- P4
- P4A
- P5

==== Dual Tone ====
- P12
- P23

==== 3 Chime ====
- P124
- P14R2
- P142A

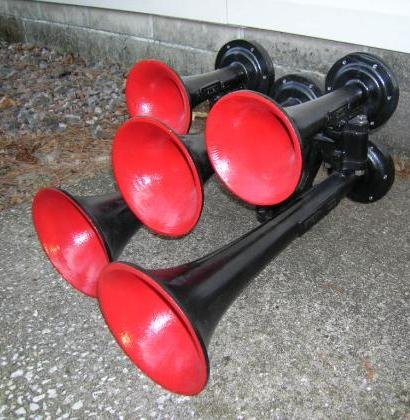
A P5 Horn

==== 5 Chime ====
- P-12345
  - Also known as a standard P5. Pre 1978 horns are known as old cast, and sound the intended A Major dominant 7th chord. The bells of old cast horns are cast with "Pat Pending" near the base. The templates used to cast the bells were revised at some point between 1976 and 1978, and the pitch of certain bells did not remain the same. This resulted in a discordant sound on the new cast horns, which can be identified by the cast "Pat Pend" on each bell where "Pat Pending" used to be. Norfolk Southern Railway is the most common user of this horn alongside the K5LA.
- P-1234a5
  - Also known as a P5A. It was developed in 1975 at the suggestion of Amtrak's Deane Ellsworth as a replacement for the Leslie SL-4T in use on the EMD SDP40F. The 4 bell is replaced with a 4a bell, changing the chord to C♯ diminished. Many of Amtrak's GE P30CH and EMD F40PH fleet were delivered with P5A's, but were later replaced with K5LA's. Similar to the standard P5, there are New and Old cast P5A's. The largest user of the new cast P5A is Metra's EMD F40PH fleet.
- P-01235
  - No known shorthand unlike the P5 and P5A. Enthusiasts refer to them as a Zero Bell P5. The 4 bell is replaced by a 0 bell (sounding the same note of "A" as the 4 bell, but one octave below). Developed in 1974 at the suggestion of Amtrak's Don Tead. It was commonly heard on Amtrak's GE E60 fleet.
- P-123L45
  - This is the rarest horn of the P series, often called a Nathan P5-3L or a 3L bell P5, the 3L is flattened by a semitone making the horn play an A major 6th, similar to the Nathan M5 and the K5LAs B major 6th.

=== C Series ===
==== Single Tone ====
- CS1
- CS2

==== 5 Chime ====
- C-5A-CWP
  - This horn is mainly used on Virginia Railway Express cab cars.

Nathan also makes P-series and M-series horns for railroads and CS-Series and KJ-series horns, KSV vertical mount horns, steam whistles, heated horn assemblies, electronic pressure regulators, control valves, flange lubricators and glo rod gauges.

K Bell Numbers
| No. | Note | Freq. (Hz) |
|---|---|---|
| 1 | D♯_{4} | 311 |
| 1L | C_{4} | 262 |
| 2 | F♯_{4} | 370 |
| 3 | A♯_{4} | 470 |
| 3L | A_{4} | 440 |
| 3A | G♯_{4} | 415 |
| 4 | C_{5} | 512 |
| 4A | B_{4} | 490 |
| 5 | D♯_{5} | 622 |
| 5H | E_{5} | 660 |

K Horns:

P-series horns also include single tone (P1), three-chime (P3) and five-chime (P5) versions. The bells are sand-cast. Frequency ranges may be from 220 to 554 hertz. The P-series horns have longer bells and a heavier manifold than the M-series. The name of the horn is a P followed by the bells that face forward, followed by R if any are reversed, and then the numbers of the reversed bells; a P12345 is a true five-chime horn with all bells facing forward, while P135R24 has bells 2 and 4 reversed.

== Former horns ==
=== M Series ===
==== 3 Chime ====
- M3
- M3H
  - The Nathan M3 design featured the M-series #1, #2, and #4 horn bells. The M3H was manufactured by Holden Ltd. for the Canadian market with the M-series #2, #3, and #4 bells. In the early years of chime horns, the M3H variant was the common three chime horn in Canada.

==== 5 Chime ====
- M5
  - Regarded as the most desired horn by collectors, this horn is tuned to play an A dominant 7th chord in first inversion while other horns are also tuned to play an A major 6th in first inversion or F♯ minor 6th on second inversion.
