= Leslie Controls =

Manufacturer of industrial water heaters, control systems and regulators

- Type: Private
- Founder: John Leslie
- Headquarters: Tampa, Florida, United States
- Products: Industrial water heaters, control systems, regulators, and train horns
- Parent: Circor International
- Website: www.lesliecontrols.com

Leslie Controls, Inc., part of the Thermal Fluid Division of Circor International Inc., is a manufacturer of industrial water heaters, control systems and regulators headquartered in Tampa, Florida.

It is one of two major manufacturers of train horns in North America, the other being Nathan Manufacturing, Inc.

== Products and services ==
In addition to air horns, Leslie Controls manufactures control valves, shutoff valves, control instrumentation, steam conditioning systems, steam water heaters and regulators. Leslie has a service center located in Tampa, which remanufactures valves made by a number of major companies. Other service centers repair valves from Watts ACV, R.G. Laurence, K&M, Contromatics, and Chas M. Bailey.

At one time, most trains used Leslie horns, but now Nathan has the majority of the market.

== History ==
Canadian John Leslie made a steam powered snowplow for railroads based on the patent assigned to him by Orange Jull. Because of his dealings with the railroads, he began making oil kindlers for coal trains, and he saw the need for a pressure reducing valve for oil kindlers for coal trains. After purchasing the patent for the Taafel Pressure Regulator in 1899, he developed the first successful pressure valve of its type. Leslie started Leslie Company in 1900 in Paterson, New Jersey, with Leslie valves made by McNab and Harlan Machine Shop. In 1905, Leslie was operating a foundry in Lyndhurst, New Jersey.

S. Inglis Leslie and associates purchased the company from his father in 1926 and the younger Leslie became its president Leslie's first products were steam control valves for trains that used coal, but after expansion the company also made air and steam whistles for ships and trains. In 1930 the company learned of the Tyfon whistle design, which was superior to other whistles of the time. Leslie bought the patent and trademark rights to the Tyfon. In 1935 Leslie made the Leslie-Tyfon air horns for the first Burlington Zephyr locomotives. Leslie-Tyfon horns became the standard on most American railroads. Leslie's horns were the most popular locomotive horns, and the standard for GM Electro-Motive Division models. Later, Leslie introduced the Type S Supertyfon, with three- and five-chime versions. The three-chime S3L was B, D#, A. Leslie sold more horns than competitor Nathan.

In 1903, Leslie began supplying valves to the United States Navy, including the battleship Georgia. During World War I and World War II, Leslie supplied military and merchant ships with steam control equipment. During World War II the company received four Army-Navy "E" Awards. Until the 1980s, Leslie supplied products to U.S. Navy ships. About 40 percent of Leslie's business came from the Navy, according to a 1987 newspaper article. Rear Admiral Frederic W. Corle, speaking to Leslie employees in 1966, stated that nearly every navy ship had steam lines with controls made by Leslie, and that Leslie valves controlled launches of planes from USS Coral type aircraft carriers.

Leslie was run by family members and was a Public company until the 1970s. In 1979, John S. Leslie, the founder's grandson, became chairman and Edwin J. Bonner became president, the first person outside the family in the position. In a leveraged buyout, employees bought Leslie in 1982.

Leslie Company's plant in Parsippany, New Jersey had more than 300 employees in 1985, and the company had two subsidiaries, plus a foundry in Oklahoma, with sales of $50 million a year.

Leslie moved to Tampa in 1986 because the New Jersey plant was old, and to cut costs and compete with companies outside the United States. Leslie Controls built a new 120,000-square-foot plant in Tampa Telecom Park. It had 230 employees, 100 who had moved from New Jersey. The company also has five service centers around the United States. Another plant was located in Canada. Its products ranged from small valves, some used for industrial plants, to custom valves that could weigh over half a ton, Some of its valves were shipped from foundries and adapted at the Leslie plant for custom uses.

Leslie was purchased in 1989 by Watts Industries, Inc. of Andover, Massachusetts, which made water valves and was trying to increase its share of the valve industry. Leslie's 1988 sales were $33 million, Watts had sales of $181 million. Leslie bought K&M Valve Company in 1995.

Watts started Circor International in 1999 when it spun off valve and control businesses relating to oil and gas.

Some asbestos-related personal injury claims that resulted from Leslie's sales to the Navy were related to parts supplied by another company which were once used inside Leslie valves. Leslie filed for bankruptcy in July 2010 due to claims exceeding profits. Leslie emerged from bankruptcy saying that the company created trusts that would pay the claims.

On November 16, 2021, HornBlasters announced that they had acquired the Air Whistles Division of Circor Leslie Controls, the oldest locomotive horn manufacturer in the United States. As a result, Circor Leslie Controls' horns, including its Supertyfon RS horn, will be sold by HornBlasters starting in 2021.
