= Wayside horn =

Audible signal used at level crossings

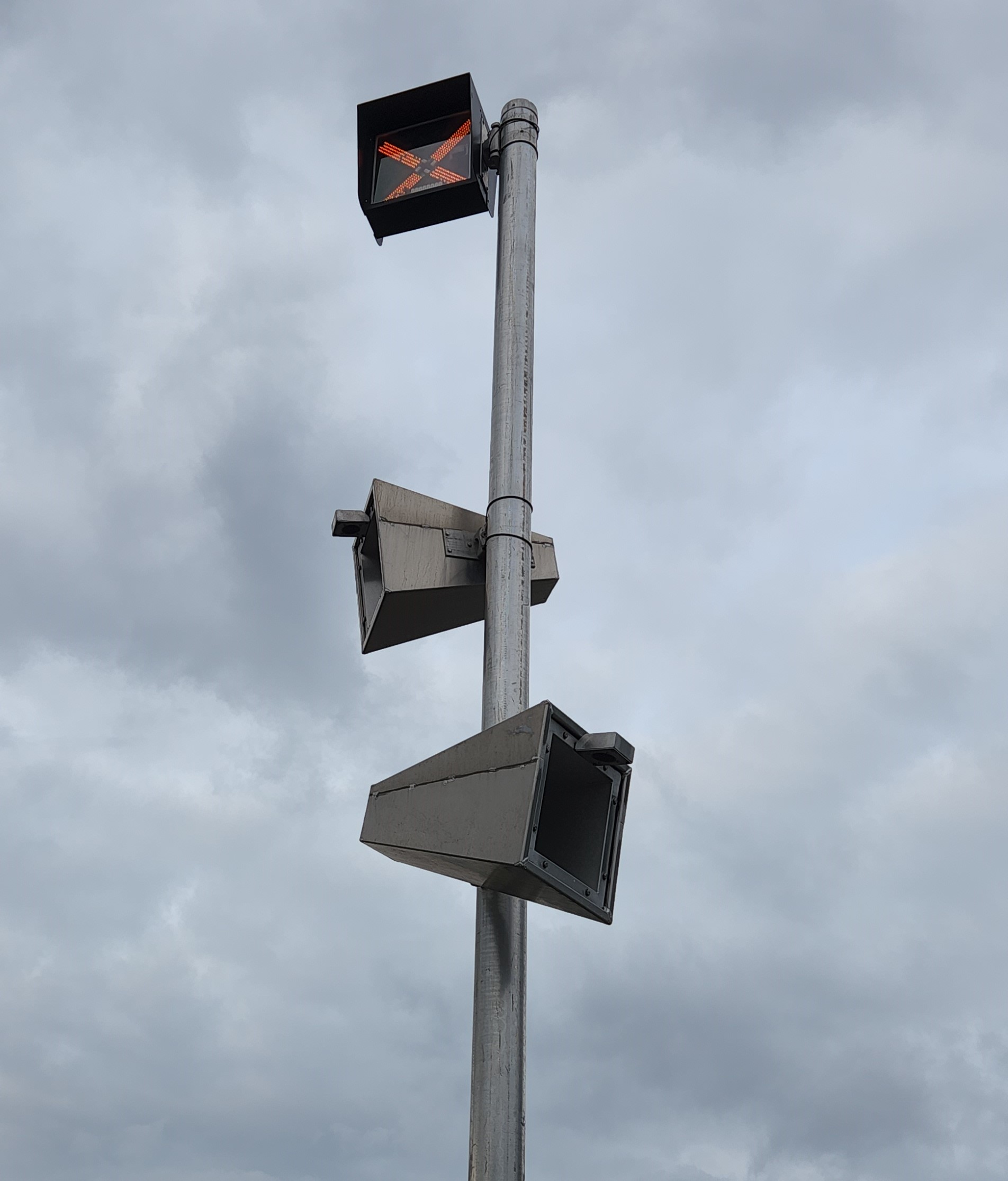
A pole-mounted wayside horn system with a flashing light to indicate that it is operational

In rail transport, a wayside horn is an audible signal used at level crossings. They can be used in place of, or in addition to, the locomotive's horn as the train approaches the crossing. They are often used in special railroad "quiet zones" in the United States, where the engineer is not required to sound the locomotive's horn at a crossing. This reduces the ambient noise at the crossing, which may be desirable in residential areas. Such railroad crossings may still require the traditional bells as part of the crossing signals in addition to the wayside horns.

One form is mounted on a pole at the crossing. The product is patented. As of March 2026, the maker of this product had gone out of business.

== See also ==
- Whistle post
