= Whistle post =

Railway sign

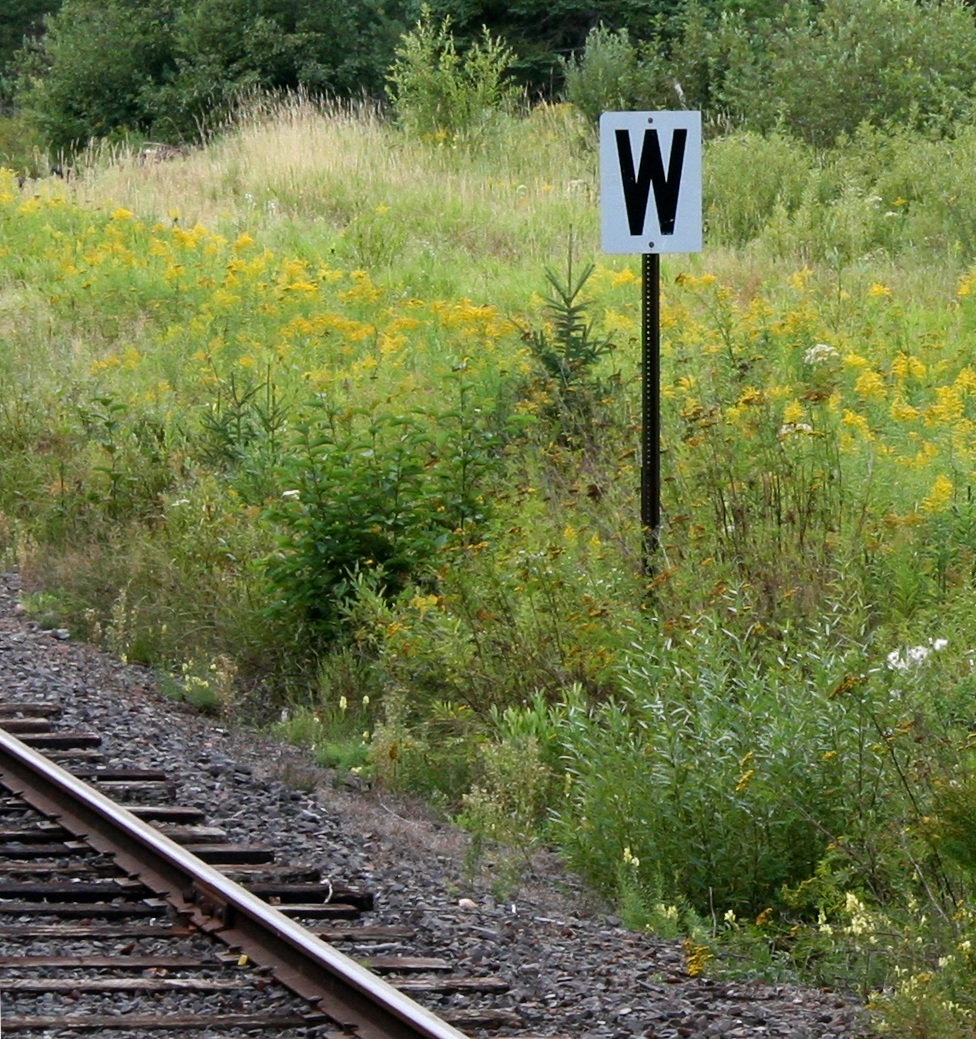
Whistle post on the North Shore Scenic Railroad in Minnesota

In rail transport, a whistle post or whistle board, is a sign marking a location where a train driver is required to sound the horn or whistle.

== Australia ==
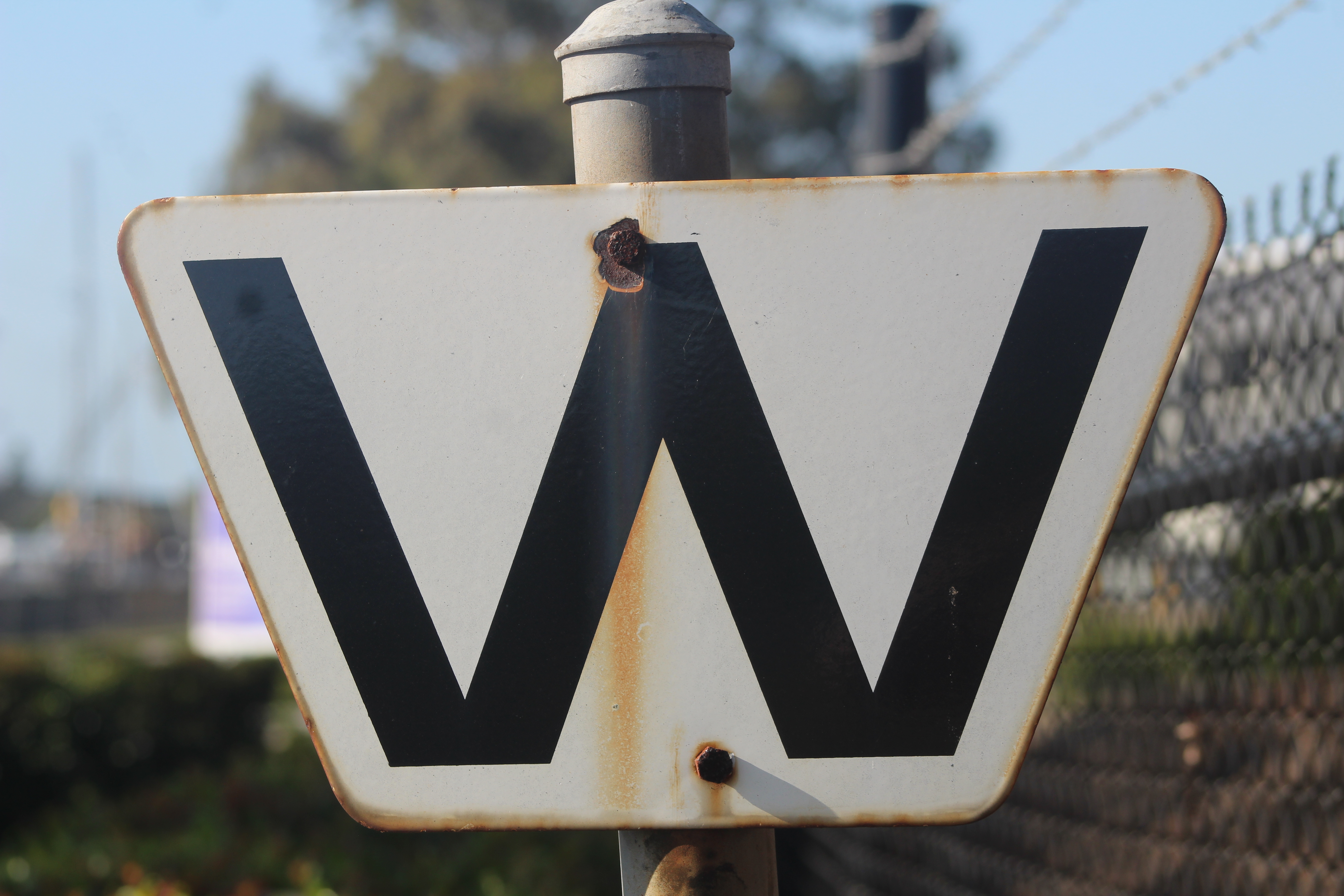
The sign on a Queensland whistle post on the old Gibson Island line

In Australia, whistle posts consist of a pole or upright flat-bottom rail with a white or reflective yellow X. In Queensland, A whistle post is mounted on a metal pole or old rail. The board is a flattened white triangle with rounded edges and a black W.

== Czech Republic ==
In the Czech Republic, a whistle post is a red and white striped pole of different sizes and shapes, and it is called "pískejte" ('whistle').

== Estonia ==
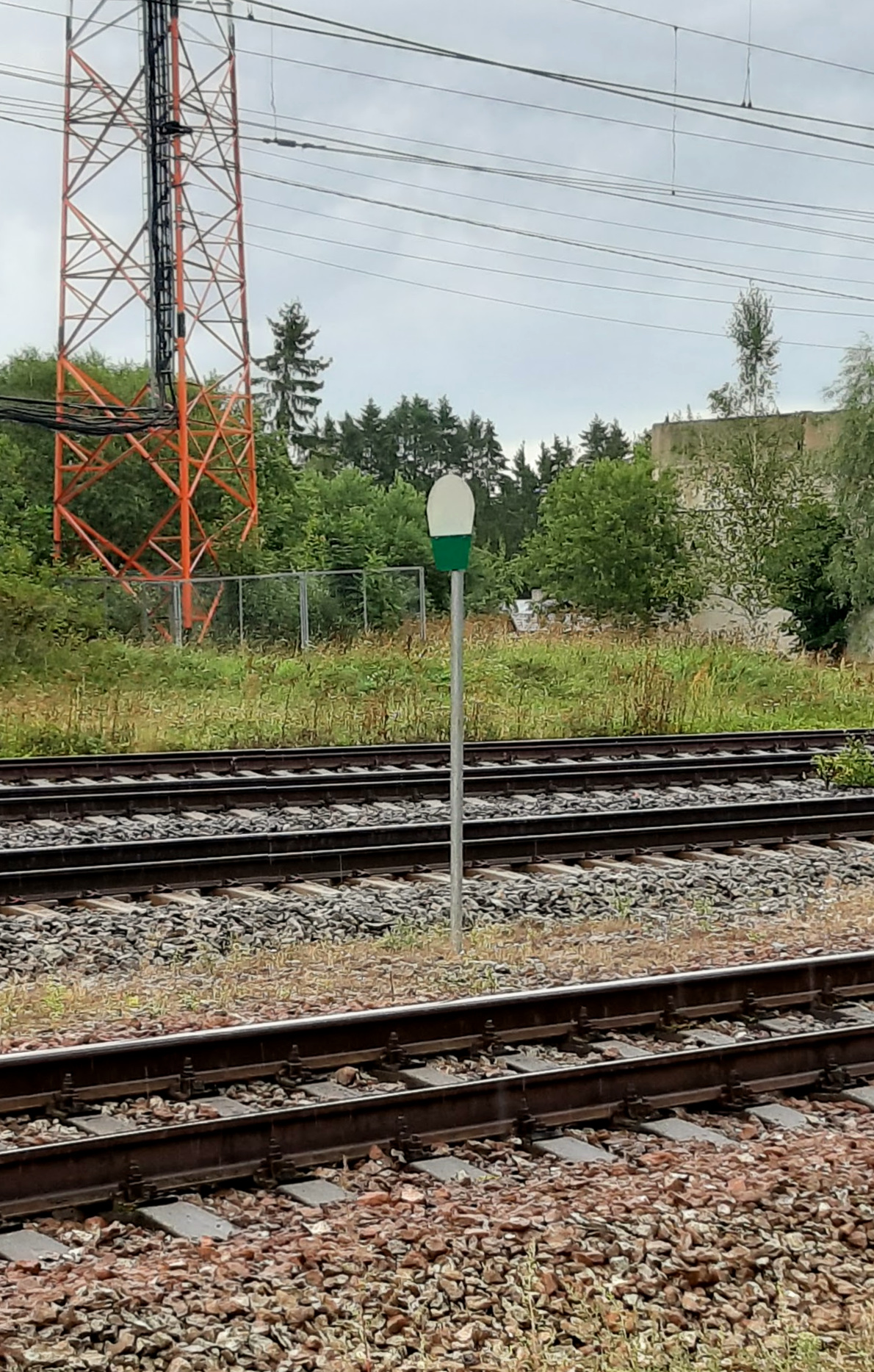
Estonian whistle post at Raasiku station

In Estonia, whistle posts are used in front of tunnels, bridges, level crossings and other places where the driver must sound one long whistle. Estonian whistle posts are inverted pear-shaped white plates, the lower third of which is green.

== France ==
In France, a whistle board comprises a black rectangular board bearing a white letter 'S' for "siffler" ('whistle'). An additional white board with a black 'J' for "jour" ('day') indicates that the sign does not apply at night time.

== Germany ==
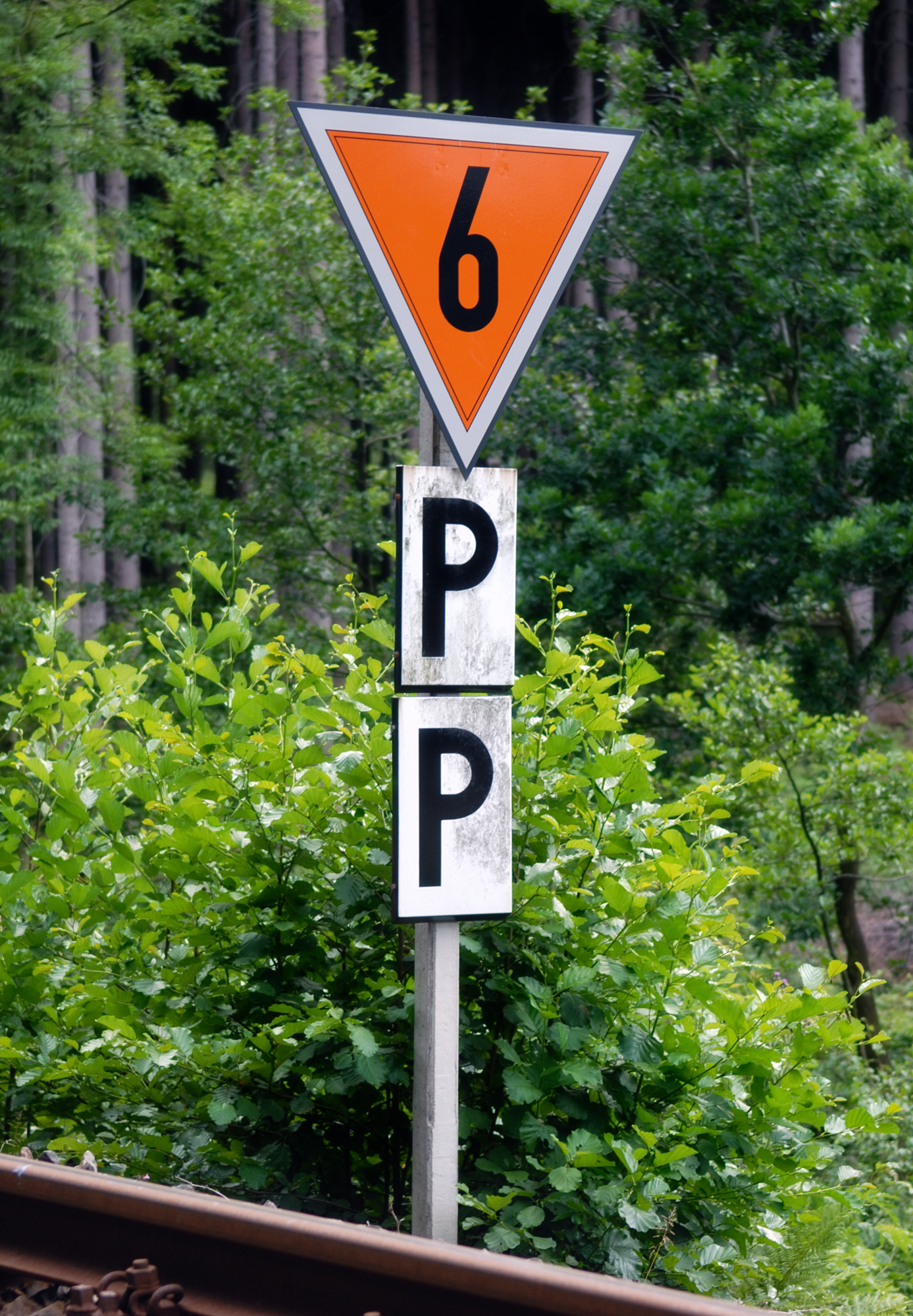
German double whistle post under a speed sign

In Germany, a rectangular board bearing the letter 'P' for "pfeifen" ('whistle') is used as a whistle board. It may have either a black 'P' on a white background, or a white 'P' on a black background. Two boards, one above the other, means "whistle twice".

Where an additional sign with two vertical stripes is mounted above the 'P' sign, that sign only applies to trains that are not stopping ahead (e.g. at a halt).

== Japan ==
Whistle posts on the Japan Railways Group comprise a yellow square with a black cross, while private railways and subway systems utilize a black square with the kanji "笛" (てき, 'whistle') in white.

== North America ==
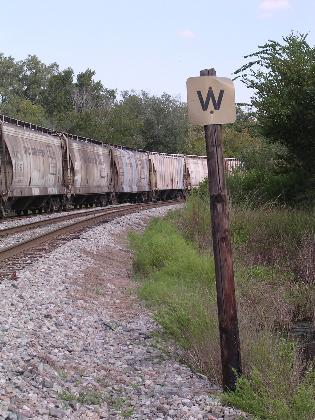
An old whistle post in Mulberry, Florida, US

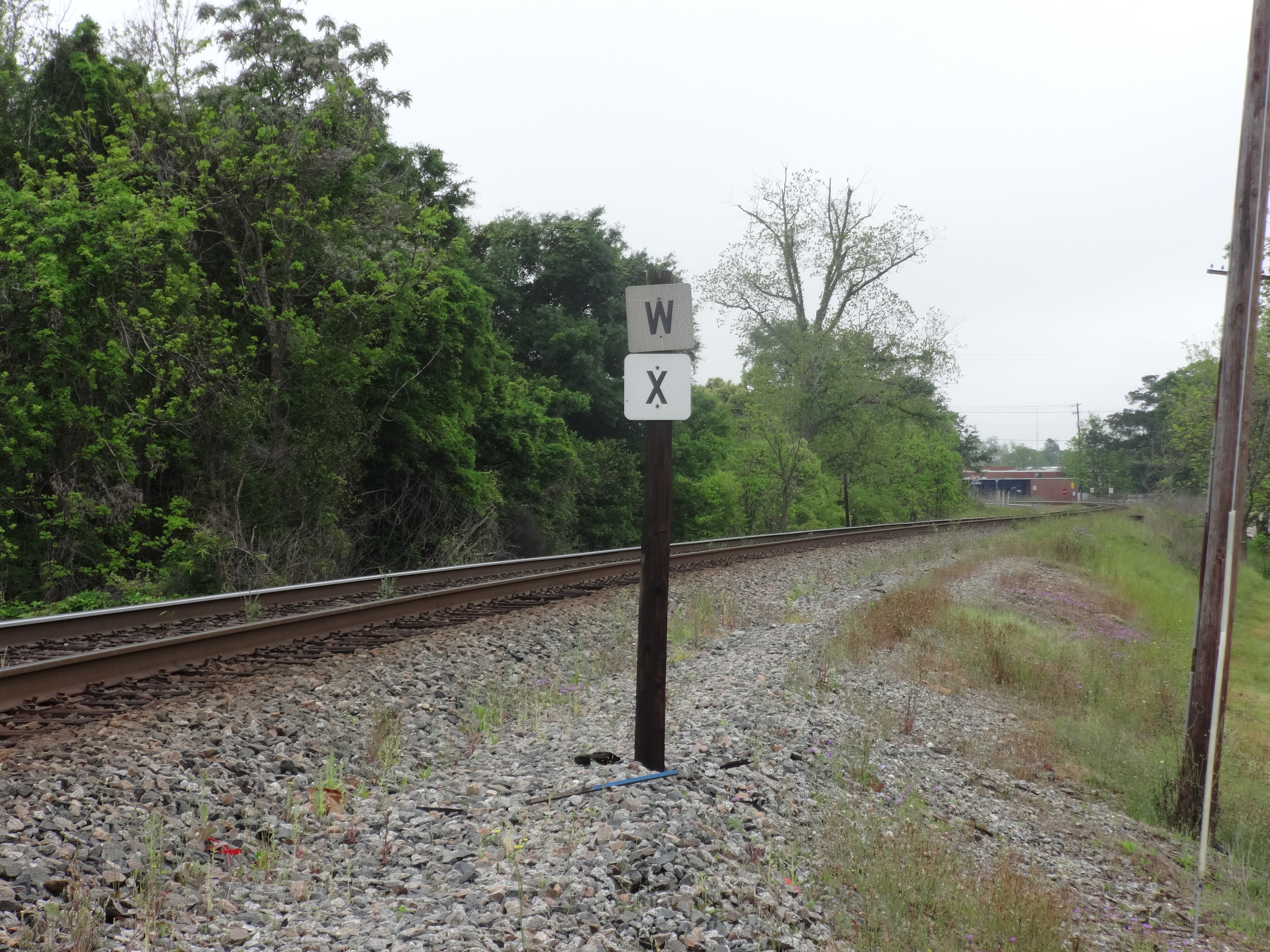
Whistle post with multiple crossings in Valdosta, Georgia, US

Whistle posts in Canada and the United States are traditionally placed 1/4 mile (400 m) in advance of a road crossing.

The signs themselves vary in design from railroad to railroad. Some were marked with – – o – (two longs, one short, and another long). This sequence is known as Rule 14(l) "Rule No. 14(l) – Approaching public crossings at grade, to be prolonged or repeated until crossing is reached unless otherwise provided". This rule is applied in almost all Canadian and U.S. operating rule books. This signal is to be prolonged or repeated until the engine or train occupies the crossing; or, where multiple crossing are involved, until the last crossing is occupied.

== Norway ==
A yellow diamond with black edges, Signal 67, or one of its varieties, is placed 250–500 metres before halts and level crossings, where the public is not otherwise warned about approaching trains. The signal is a two to three-second blast with the horn.

== People's Republic of China ==
In the People's Republic of China, a whistle board is a white diamond with a black border with the character míng 鸣 ('whistle') on it.

== Poland ==
PKP W6b whistle board for road level crossings not secured or not included in station or line interlocking devices

In Poland, a W6 whistle board comprises a white triangle with a black border. Since June 2020 a W6a whistle board associated with a level crossing depicts the silhouette of a car in the middle of the triangle is no longer used to whistle before level crossings, it only warns train driver that train is approaching secured level crossing. Trains must whistle only when approaching W6b board that is made of two W6a boards, it warns train driver that train is approaching level crossing that is not secured or not included in station or line interlocking devices.

There are some variant of the sign. One with thick line below the character is usually installed before the level crossing, another without the line is installed within some yard nearby local villages.

== Sweden ==
In Sweden, a whistle board is a black triangle with a white border, pointing downwards. Whistle boards before level crossings have an additional sign, a yellow square with a black V. If the trains are supposed to sound the horn at daytime only (between 6 a.m. and 10 p.m.) there is another additional sign, rectangular and black/white. For a level crossing, the horn signal is a three-second blast at the whistle board and a three-second blast between the board and the crossing.

== Thailand ==
In Thailand, whistle post consists of circular sign with Thai character "ว" on it. "ว" comes from the word "หวีด", which means whistle.

== United Kingdom ==
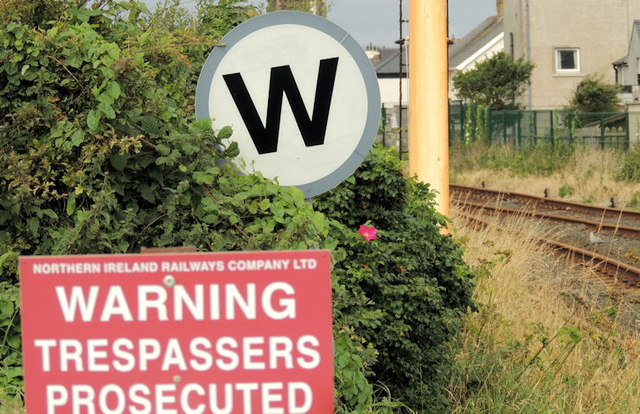
British Rail modern whistle board at Castlerock

Modern whistle boards in the UK comprise a white circular sign bearing a letter W. Early whistle boards generally had the word whistle written in full on a rectangular board. The Great Western Railway's signs had SW for "sound whistle".

One modern variation found in Scotland is the 'continuous' whistle board, comprising a white rectangle with the W below a diagonal cross. The driver must sound the horn continuously on the approach to the level crossing ahead.

== See also ==
- Glossary of rail transport terms
- Wayside horn
