= Train horn =

Air horn used as a warning device on trains

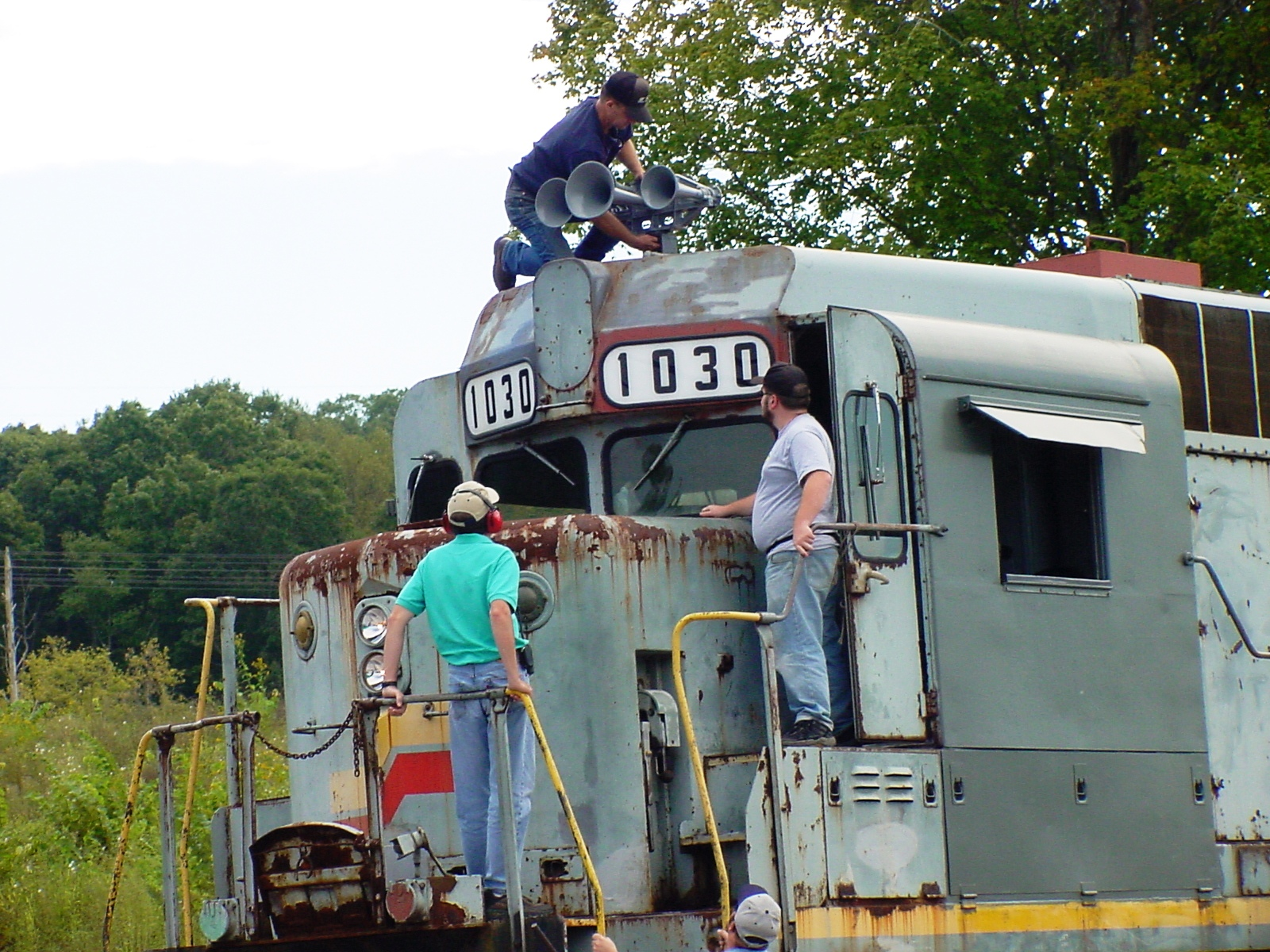
Leslie S-5T train horn being fitted to a restored ex-Seaboard System EMD GP30 diesel locomotive at the 2006 Oak Ridge Horn Honk and Collectors Meet

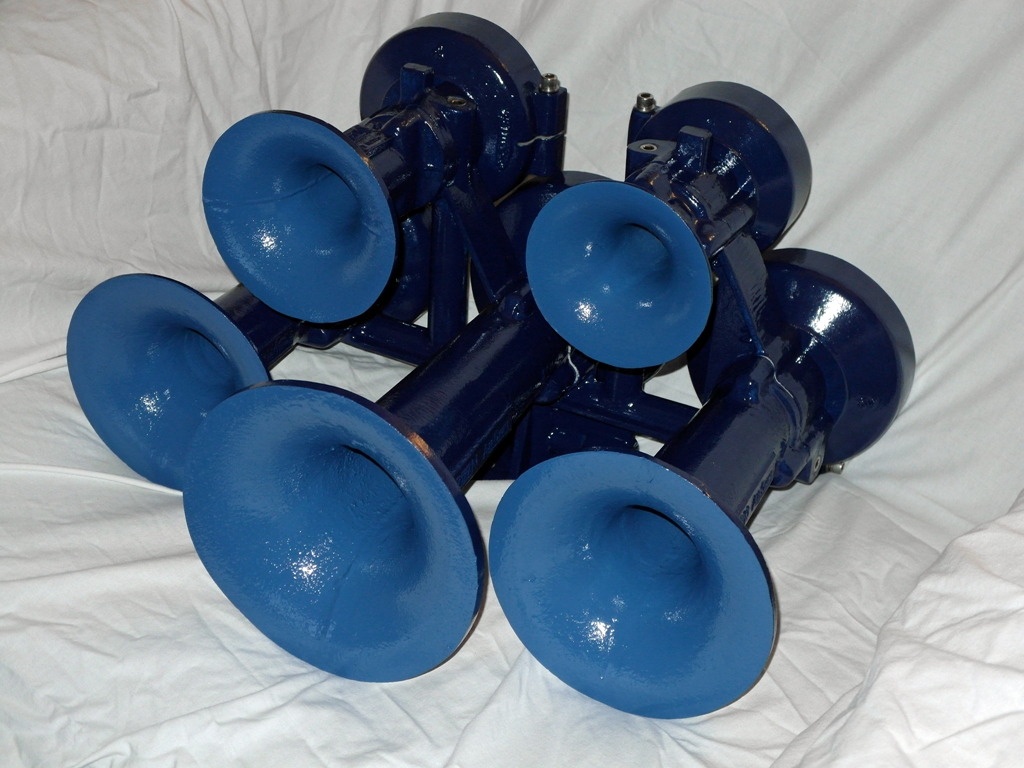
Train horns are made of multiple horn units called chimes which produce different notes; sounded together they make a chord. The Nathan model M5 pictured is a 5 chime horn.

A train horn is an air horn used as an audible warning device on diesel and electric-powered trains and control cars. Its primary purpose is to alert persons and animals to an oncoming train, especially when approaching a level crossing. They are often extremely loud, allowing them to be heard from great distances. They are also used for acknowledging signals given by railroad employees, such as during switching operations. For steam locomotives, the equivalent device is a train whistle.

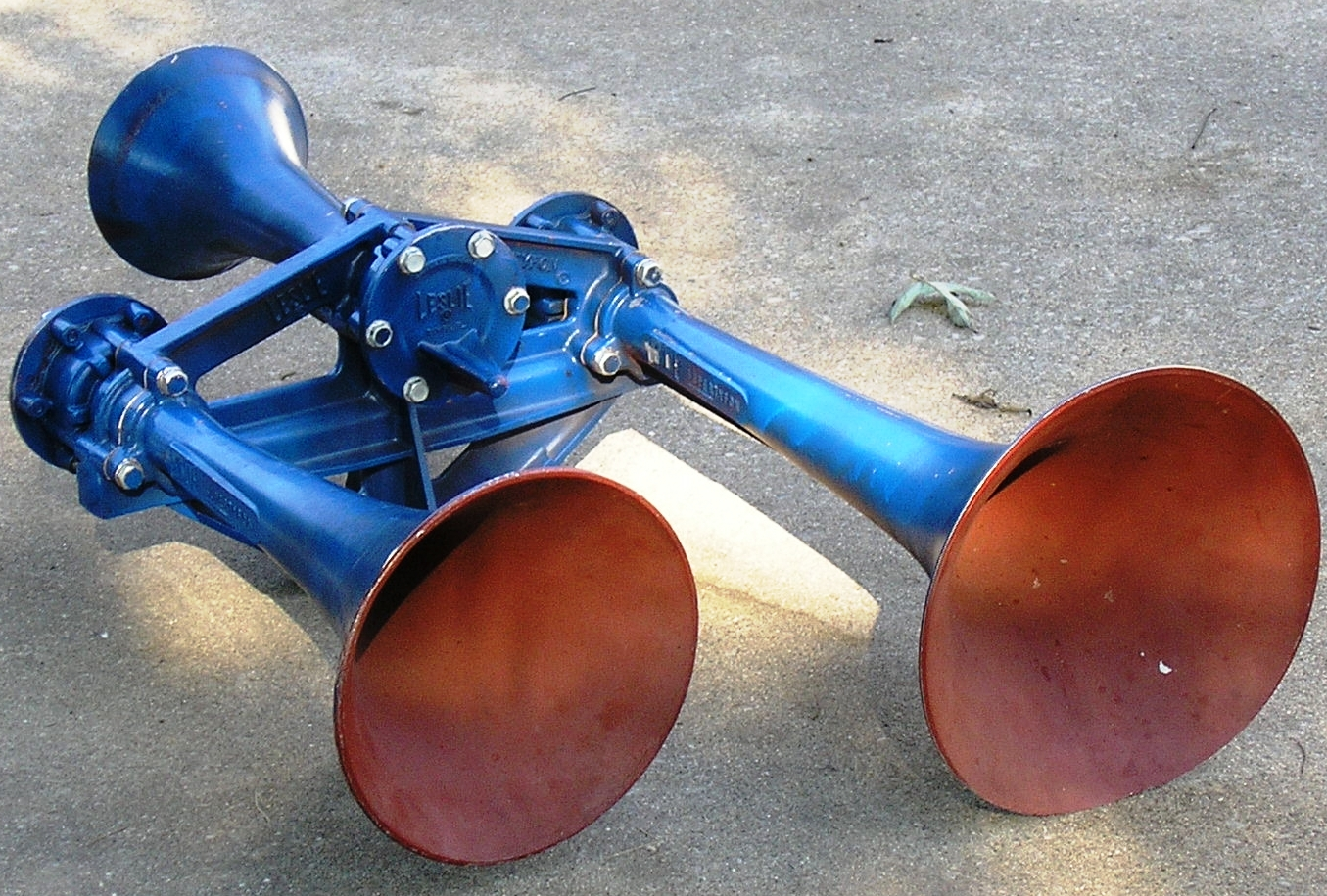
Leslie RS3L locomotive horn, once the most common horn in use on North American railroads

== History and background ==
Since trains move on fixed rails, they are uniquely susceptible to collision. This is exacerbated by the train's enormous weight and inertia, which make it difficult to quickly stop when encountering an obstacle. Also, trains generally do not stop at level crossings, instead relying on pedestrians and vehicles to clear the tracks when they pass. Therefore, from their beginnings, locomotives have been equipped with loud horns or bells to warn vehicles and pedestrians that they are coming. Steam locomotives had steam whistles, operated from steam produced by their boilers.

As diesel locomotives began to replace steam on most railroads during the mid-20th century, it was realized that the new locomotives were unable to utilize the steam whistles then in use. Early internal combustion locomotives were initially fitted with small truck horns or exhaust-powered whistles, but these were found to be unsuitable and hence the air horn design was scaled up and modified for railroad use. Early train horns often were tonally similar to the air horns still heard on road-going trucks today. It was found that this caused some confusion among people who were accustomed to steam locomotives and the sound of their whistles; when approaching a grade crossing, when some people heard an air horn they expected to see a truck, not a locomotive, and accidents happened. So, locomotive air horns were created that had a much higher, more musical note, tonally much more like a steam whistle. This is why most train horns have a unique sound, different from that of road going trucks, although many switcher locomotives, which didn't see road service (service on the main lines), retained the deeper truck-like horns.

Strict regulations specific to each country specify how loud horns must be, and how far in advance of grade crossings and other locations locomotive engineers are required to sound their horns to give adequate time to clear the tracks. Standard signals consisting of different sequences of horn blasts must be given in different circumstances.

Due to the encroachment of development, some suburban dwellers have opposed railroad use of the air horn as a trackside warning device. Residents in some communities have attempted to establish quiet zones, in which train crews are instructed not to sound their horns, except in case of emergency.

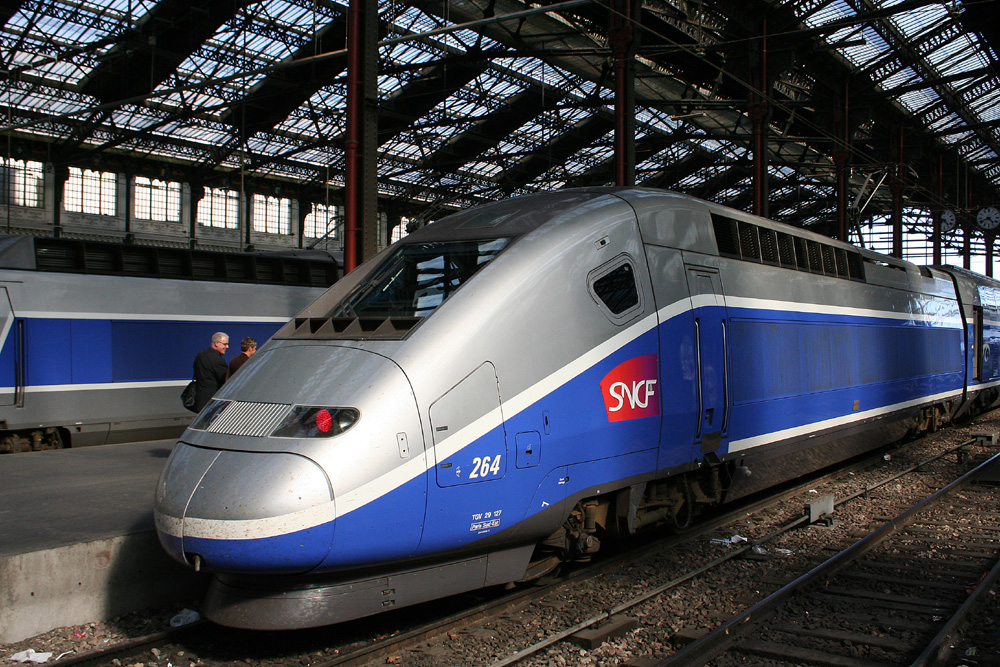
Horn mounting location in a TGV Duplex power car. The horn grille is visible between the train headlights/taillights

Recent years have seen an increase of horn theft from railroad property.

== Operation ==
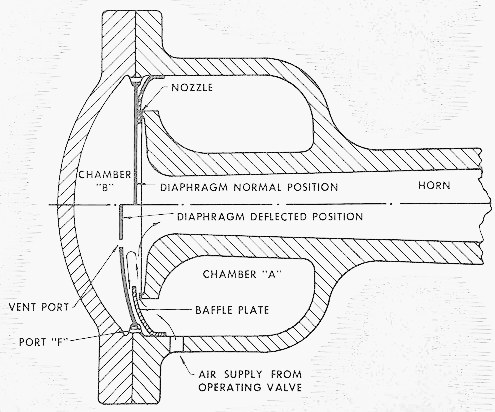
Diagram of a typical locomotive air horn power chamber, showing operation

Train horns are operated by compressed air, typically 125–140 psi (8.6–9.7 bar), and fed from a locomotive main air reservoir. When the engineer opens the horn valve, air flows through a supply line into the power chamber at the horn's base (diagram, right). It passes through a narrow opening between a nozzle and a circular diaphragm in the power chamber, then out through the flaring horn bell. The flow of air past the diaphragm causes it to vibrate or oscillate against the nozzle, producing sound.

When an air horn is not operating and has no fluid pressure flowing through it, the interior of the power chamber housing is completely airtight, as the diaphragm disc creates a full airtight seal against the nozzle surface. As this diagram illustrates, when a constant stream of pressurized fluid enters through the small bottom inlet, the pressure in the airtight power chamber increases. The pressure continues rising in Chamber 'A' until the pressure overcomes the diaphragm's spring tension. Once this occurs, the diaphragm is deflected back and is no longer sealed against the nozzle, causing the power chamber to lose its airtightness. The pressurized fluid then escapes out of the horn bell, at a much faster rate than it enters the power chamber, causing the pressure in the power chamber to drop rapidly and the diaphragm to re-seat itself against the nozzle surface. This entire process is one cycle of the diaphragm operating. In reality, it occurs much faster, in accordance to the frequency produced by the horn. The diaphragm's constant back-and-forth oscillation creates sound waves, which are amplified by the large flared horn bell. The horn bell's length, thickness and diameter contribute to the frequency of the note the horn produces.

When vibrated by the diaphragm, the column of air in the bell oscillates with standing waves. The bell's length determines the waves' wavelength, and thus the fundamental frequency (pitch) of the note produced by the horn (measured in hertz). The longer the bell, the lower the note.

North American diesel locomotives manufactured prior to the 1990s used an air valve actuated by the engineer through the manipulation of a lever or pull cord. This made possible a practice known as "feathering", where the engineer could affect the horn's modulation, and thus its volume, by changing the volume of air flowing into it.

Many locomotives manufactured during the 1990s have push-button horn controls. Several North American locomotives incorporated a sequencer pedal, built into the cab floor beneath the operator's position; when depressed, they sound the crossing sequence.

Locomotives of European origin have had push-button horn controls since the mid-1960s.

Current production locomotives from GE Transportation Systems and Electro-Motive Diesel use a lever-actuated solenoid valve.

== Placement on trains ==
As many individuals do with their personal vehicles, railroads order locomotives and cab cars with different options in order to suit their operating practices. Air horns are no exception, and railroad mechanical forces mount these on locomotives where they are deemed most effective at projecting sound, and for ease of maintenance.

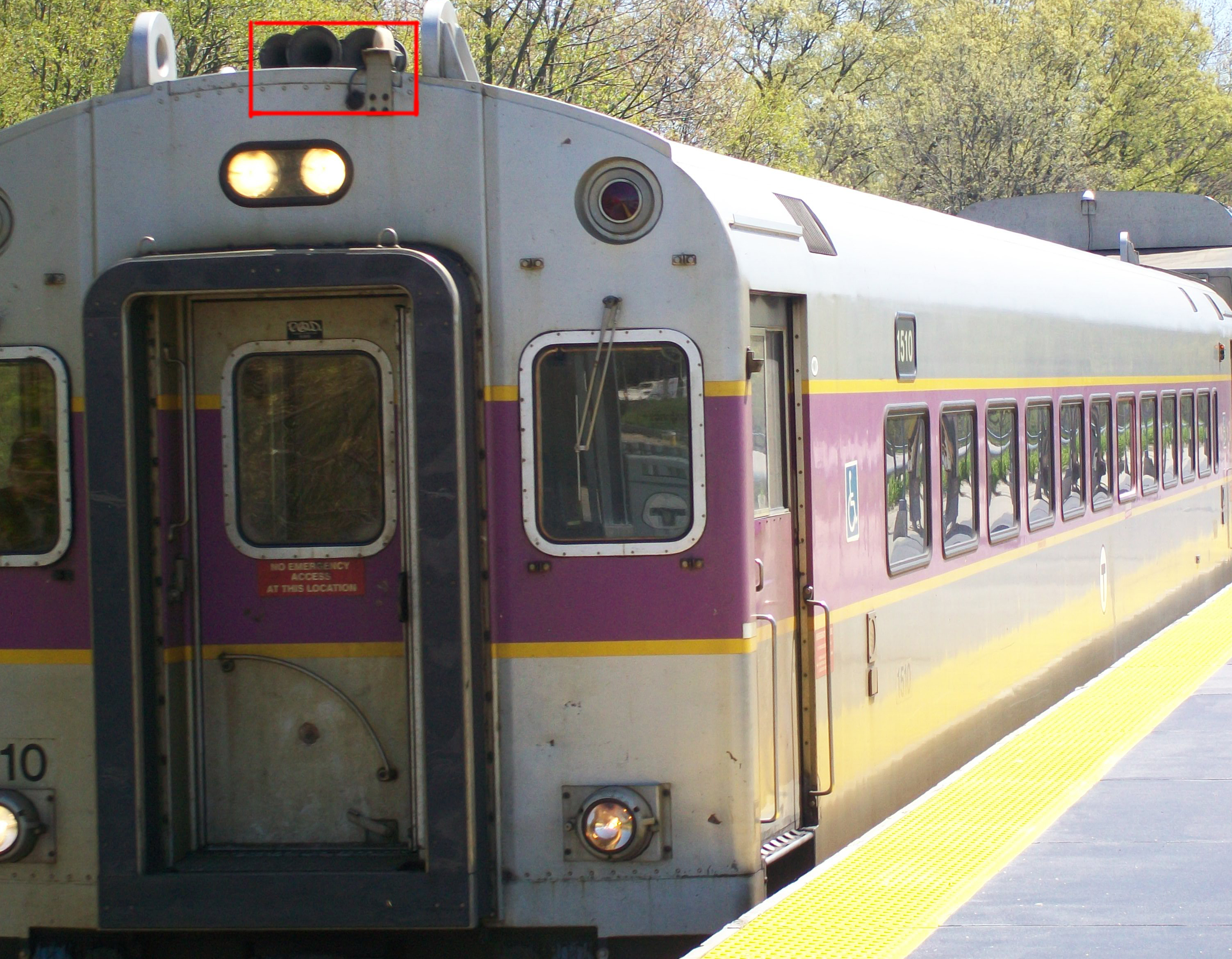
Horn mounted on an MBTA Commuter Rail control car in push mode

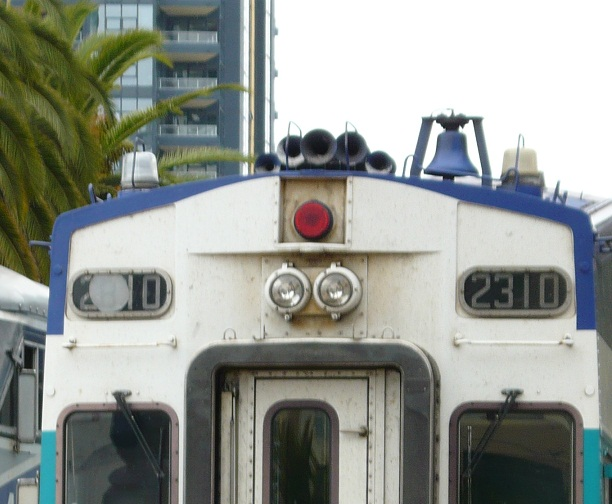
Horn mounted atop a San Diego Coaster cab car

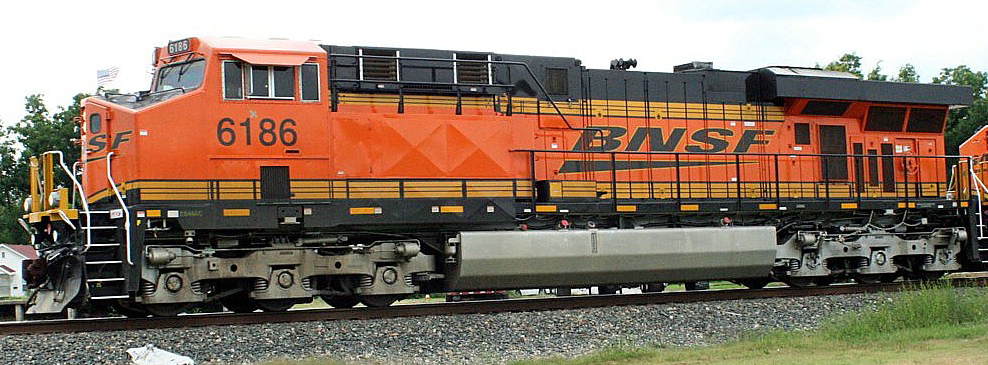
Horn mounted in the middle section of the roof on a BNSF locomotive

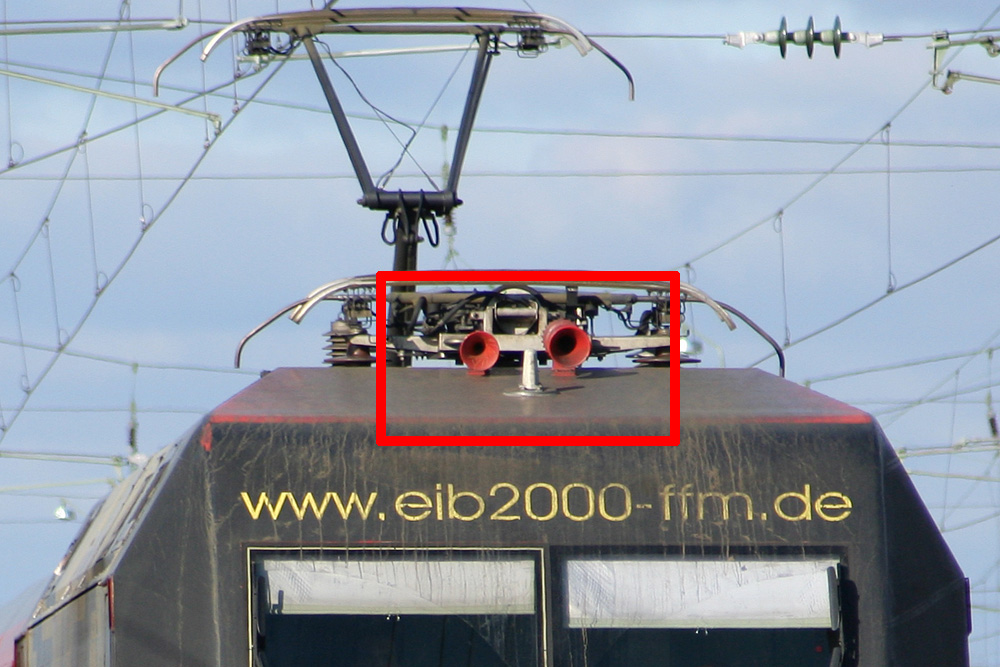
Typical horn mounting location on European locomotives

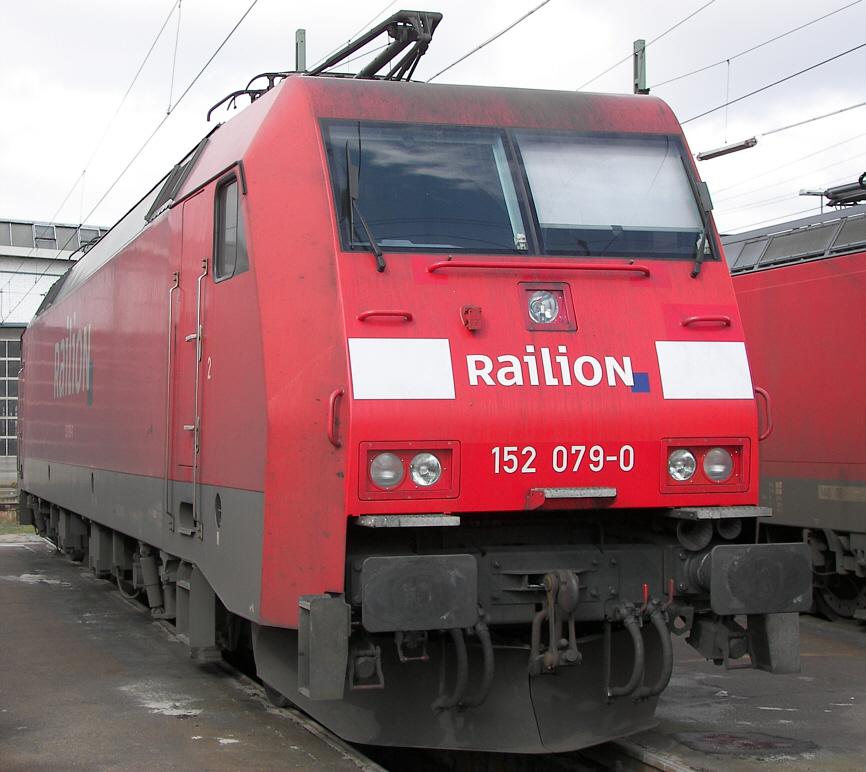
Low horn mounting location on a European locomotive. The horn is visible above the right side buffer.

== Audio samples ==
European train air horn
(329 KB)

Japanese train air horn
(158 KB)

Malaysian Sabah train air horn
(627 KB)

Indonesian train horn
(224 KB)

The following are samples of select air horns as used in North American railroad service:

AirChime K5LA
(329 KB)

Leslie A200-156
(127 KB)

Leslie S-3L
(187 KB)

Leslie S-5T
(275 KB)

Nathan M5
(277 KB)

Nathan P5
(358 KB)

Prime PM-920
(312 KB)

Prime PM-990
(301 KB)

WABCO E2
(243 KB)

WABCO E2-B1
(274 KB)

== Countries ==
=== United States ===
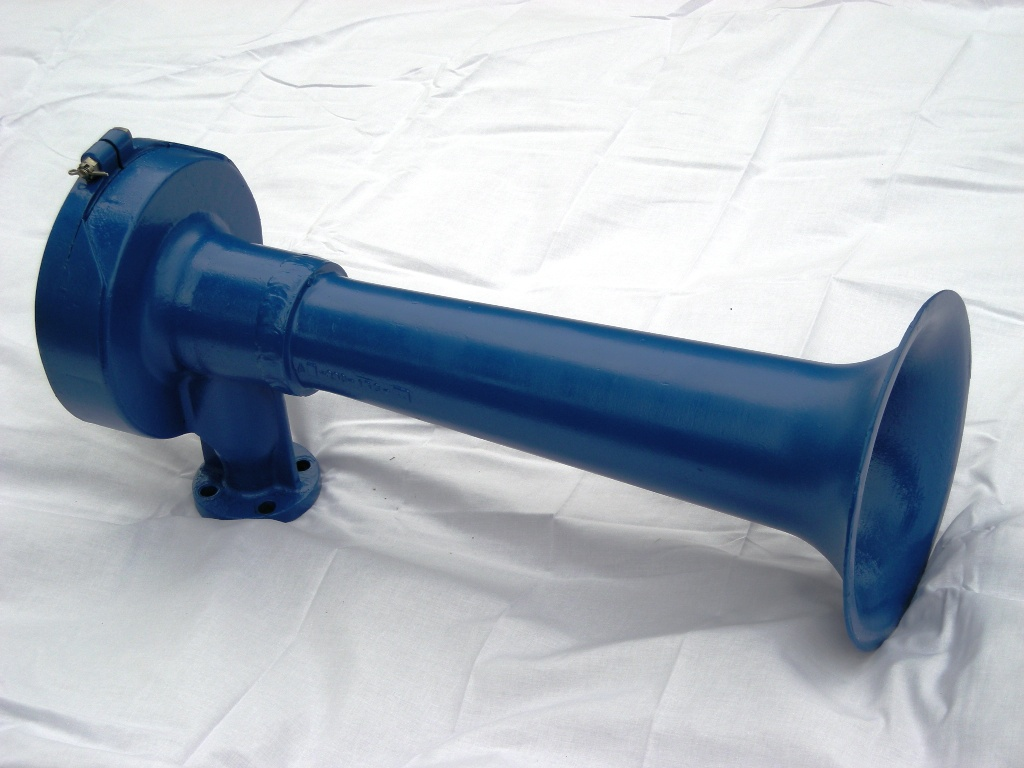
Leslie A200-156, a single chime horn used on locomotives in the early days of dieselization

On April 27, 2005, the Federal Railroad Administration (FRA), which enforces rail safety regulations, published the final rule on the use of locomotive horns at highway-rail grade crossings. Effective June 24, 2005, the rule requires that locomotive horns be sounded at all public grade crossings at least 15 seconds, but not more than 20 seconds before entering a crossing. This rule applies when the train speed is below 45 mph (70 km/h). At 45 mph or above, trains are still required to sound their horn at the designated location (usually denoted with a whistle post). The FRA regulations require train horns to be a minimum of 92 decibels (dB) and a maximum of 110 dB when measured from 100 feet forward of the locomotive in its direction of travel.

The pattern for blowing the horn remains two long, one short, and one long. This is to be repeated or prolonged as necessary until the lead locomotive fully occupies the crossing. Locomotive engineers retain the authority to vary this pattern as necessary for crossings in proximity, and are allowed to sound the horn in emergency situations no matter where the location.

==== Quiet zones ====
Public authorities have the option to maintain or establish quiet zones provided certain supplemental or alternative safety measures are in place, and the crossing accident rate meets government standards.

A ban on sounding locomotive horns in Florida was ordered removed by the FRA after it was shown that the accident rate doubled during the ban. The new ruling preempts any state or local laws regarding the use of the train horn at public crossings.

==== Common horn signals ====
The following are the required horn signals listed in the operating rules of most North American railroads, along with their meanings. Signals are illustrated by an ▄ for short sounds, and ▄▄▄ for longer sounds. (Note that these signals and their indications are updated to reflect modern practice; in earlier times there were unique whistle signals for the engineer to, for example, send out and then later recall the brakeman/flagman riding in the caboose.) Those rules marked with an asterisk (✱) must be sounded when or where applicable. Those signals without an asterisk convey information to employees; they must be used when voice communication is not available.

Rule		Sequence	Meaning
14 (a)		—	Applying air brakes while standing
14 (b)	✱	▄▄▄ ▄▄▄	Proceeding, releasing air brakes; often referred to as "whistling off", despite being given by an air horn
14 (f)	✱	▄ ▄ ▄▄▄	Acknowledging a flagman's stop signal
14 (g)	✱	▄ ▄	Acknowledging any signal not otherwise provided for
14 (h)	✱	▄ ▄ ▄	Backing up
14 (j)		▄ ▄ ▄ ▄	Calling for signals
14 (l)	✱	▄▄▄ ▄▄▄ ▄ ▄▄▄▄	1. Trains or engines approaching public highway grade crossings shall sound the horn at least 15 seconds, but no more than 20 seconds before the lead engine enters the crossing. Trains or engines travelling at speeds greater than 45 mph shall begin sounding the horn at or about, but not more than, one-quarter mile (1,320 feet [400 m]) in advance of the nearest public crossing. Even if the advance warning provided by the horn will be less than 15 seconds in duration. This signal is to be prolonged or repeated until the engine or train occupies the crossing; or, where multiple crossing are involved, until the last crossing is occupied.; 2. Approaching tunnels, yards, or other points where railroad workers may be at work.; 3. Passing standing trains.
14 (m)	✱	▄	Approaching passenger station
14 (o)		▄ ▄▄▄	Inspect train for a leak in brake pipe system or for brakes sticking
14 (p)	✱	series of short blasts	Warning to people or animals
14 (q)	✱	▄▄▄ ▄	1. When running against the current direction of traffic 2. Approaching stations, curves, or other points where view may be obscured 3. Approaching passenger or freight trains and when passing freight trains
Exception			Engine horn signals required by rules 14 (b) and 14 (h) do not apply after momentary stops in continuous switching movements.

=== Canada ===
According to section 11 of Transport Canada's Locomotive Design Requirements, all Canadian-owned passenger train locomotives must be equipped with a dual-tone horn capable of producing a soft sound in normal operating mode and a loud sound in emergency situations. To comply with federal requirements, passenger railways use the Nathan K5CA-LS. This horn has two different air chambers, allowing the engineer to choose between sounding three chimes in "soft" mode or all five chimes in "loud" mode. The "loud" mode is intended for emergency situations, such as when a person or vehicle is on the tracks in front of an incoming train. The loud emergency mode produces a high-pitched and extremely discordant sound to get people's attention.

To maximize sound output, Transport Canada requires that all train horns be mounted facing the direction of travel, near the front of the roof, no further than 1.5 metres (4 ft 11 in) behind the rear of the cab, and near the centerline of the locomotive in a location where it will not obstruct exhaust pipes in any direction.

Train horns must produce a minimum sound level of 96 decibels (dB) in a 30-metre (100 ft) radius from the locomotive.

==== Horn warning signals ====
According to the May 2018 version of the Canadian Rail Operating Rules (CROR), specific train horn warning signals must be sounded as per rule 14. Like the American Federal Railroad Administration, signals are illustrated using ▄ for short sounds, and ▄▄▄ for longer sounds. In the CROR, it states that warning signals "should be distinct, with intensity and duration proportionate to the distance the signal is to be conveyed". The following table lists the train horn warning signals required by Transport Canada. The signals marked with an asterisk (✱) must not be replaced with radio communication.

Train horn warning signals in Canada
Rule		Sequence	Meaning
14 a)		▄	When standing, to indicate that braking system is equalized (angle cock may be closed)
14 b)		▄ ▄	To answer a "stop" signal (except for a fixed signal); To answer any signal not otherwise provided for
14 e)		▄ ▄ ▄ ▄ ▄ ▄	To notify crews of fire on the tracks, to be repeated as often as required
14 f)	✱	series of short blasts	To warn people to get off the tracks
14 L)	✱	▄▄▄ ▄▄▄ ▄ ▄▄▄▄	To warn people at a level crossing that a train is coming. An indicator, located 0.4 kilometres (1/4 mile) from the crossing, marks the location where the horn must be sounded when the train is travelling faster than 70 km/h (43 mph). When the train is travelling at 70 km/h or less, this signal must be sounded for twenty seconds prior to occupying the crossing. The signal must be prolonged or repeated until the crossing is fully occupied by the lead unit of a train.
14 L)	✱	▄▄▄ ▄▄▄ ▄ ▄▄▄▄	To be sounded at specific indicators located along the tracks in special instructions
14 L)	✱	▄▄▄ ▄▄▄ ▄ ▄▄▄▄	To be sounded at frequent intervals when view is restricted by weather, curvature, or other conditions
14 L)		▄▄▄ ▄▄▄ ▄ ▄▄▄▄	Special instructions are given when this signal is not required to be sounded in whole or in part
14 t)			When snow removal equipment is being operated ahead of a locomotive, the snowplow operator is required to sound rules 14 f) and 14 L). The engineer operating the locomotive shoving the snow removal equipment is required to sound all other horn warning signals as per rule 14.

==== Noise from train horns ====
Residents living in close proximity to train tracks may be disturbed by the sounding of train horn warning signals. However, train drivers are obligated to sound their horns at all times, which may lead to noise complaints. Transport Canada allows municipalities to pass bylaws that prohibit train horn sounding at train stations and level crossings, as long as Transport Canada grants approval to that municipality.

=== Germany ===
Horn signals are regulated in the Zp category of the Eisenbahn-Bau- und Betriebsordnung. Their most common use today is when approaching a level crossing that lacks barriers, and for warning purposes.

Whistle posts are labeled with the letter "P" (for Pfeifen – "whistle"). Common signals are:

Sequence	Meaning
▄▄▄	Zp 1: generic "attention" signal
▄	Zp 2: tighten handbrakes
▄ ▄	Zp 3: strongly tighten handbrakes
▄▄▄ ▄▄▄	Zp 4: loosen handbrakes
▄ ▄ ▄ ▄ ▄ ▄ ▄ ▄ ▄	Zp 5: emergency; brake immediately
▄▄▄ ▄ ▄▄▄	Zp 11: come; used to call out for train staff

=== France ===
A train horning and passing the station of Bois-le-Roi, this device is also used to warn the passengers when a train passes a station without stopping or crosses a level crossing. For safety reasons, passengers must move away from the edge of the platform (stations) or safety barriers lower when trains are announced (level crossings).

Train horns are sounded where a whistle post (marked with the letter "S" for siffler – "to whistle") is present. If the whistle post is labelled "J" (meaning jour – "day"), the horn is only to be sounded between 07:00 and 20:00. Horns must also be sounded when passing an oncoming train, and shortly before reaching the last car of the train. Train horns must also be used upon entering into a tunnel: first horn shortly before the tunnel entrance, second horn when entering, third horn shortly before the tunnel's exit.

=== India ===
▄ denotes a short blast on the horn; ▄▄ denotes a comparatively long blast on the horn; ▄▄▄ denotes a longer blast on the horn; and ▄▄▄▄▄▄▄▄▄▄▄ denotes a very long blast on the horn.

The Indian Railways Fan Club FAQ lists the following:

Sequence	Meaning
▄	Whilst standing: Indication to driver of the assisting engine that driver of leading engine is ready to start.; Acknowledgement by the driver of the assisting engine.; Engine ready to leave yard; Engine ready to go to loco yard; Light loco or shunter about to move Whilst moving: Assistance of other engine not required; Acknowledgement by driver of the assisting engine
▄▄ ▄	Normal departure from station on receipt of clear signal, usually followed by another long blast about 10–20 seconds after the first one after the guard's all-right signal is received; Beginning of shunting operation (if shunted rake has passengers in it)
▄ ▄	Call for guard's signal; Signals not exchanged by guard; Signals not exchanged by station staff
▄▄ ▄	Guard to release brakes; Whilst standing engine from a midsection/station; Main Line clear
▄ ▄ ▄	Guard to apply brakes; Train out of control, guard to assist
▄ ▄ ▄▄	Sudden loss of brake pressure or vacuum (perhaps by alarm chain being pulled)
▄ ▄ ▄ ▄	Train cannot proceed on account of accident, failure or other cause; Protect train in rear
▄▄ ▄▄ ▄ ▄	Call for guard to come to engine
▄ ▄▄ ▄	Token not received; Token missed; With wrong authority to proceed; Passing stop signal at "on" with proper authority
▄▄▄	Whilst standing: Vacuum recreated on ghat section, remove sprags; Passing automatic stop signal at "on" Whilst moving: Acknowledgement of guards signal
▄▄▄▄▄▄▄▄▄▄▄	Approaching level crossing or tunnel area; Recall staff protecting train in rear; Material train ready to leave; Running through a station; Approaching a stop signal at "on"; Detained at stop signal; Passing stop signal at "on" after waiting the stipulated time
▄▄ ▄ ▄▄ ▄	Alarm chain pulled; Insufficient vacuum in engine; Guard applies vacuum brakes
▄▄ ▄▄	Raise pantograph (electric locomotive only)
▄▄ ▄ ▄▄	Lower pantograph (electric locomotive only)
▄ ▄ ▄ ▄ ▄ ▄ ▄ ▄ ▄	Apprehension of danger; Danger signal to driver of an approaching train whose path is obstructed; Moving in wrong direction on a double line; Used by EMU motormen to warn passengers on a crowded platform of the approach of a fast train which will not be stopping

=== United Kingdom ===
UK diesel and electric locomotives are usually fitted with two-tone horns, sounded sequentially to distinguish them from the horns used on road vehicles, the tones being described as either 'high' or 'low'. In the past, both tones were routinely used. The basic rules from the early 1960s required that the horn should be clearly audible at a distance of 400 m (1,300 ft) from the source. However, because of noise complaints, new rules were introduced in 2007:

1. The introduction of a night time quiet period, between 23:00 and 07:00 when trains will no longer routinely sound their horns at whistle boards (they will always sound their horns when people are seen on the track). In 2016 Network Rail changed the night time quiet period to 00:00–06:00.
2. That where the technology is available, drivers should only use the low tone from the two tone horn at whistle boards.
3. For all new or replacement train horns on trains capable of travelling up to 100 mph (160 km/h) a much lower minimum sound pressure level has been established – and a maximum sound level has been introduced (min 101 dB and max 106 dB).

British train horns have two tones, high or low, and in some cases, a loud or soft setting. If the horn lacks a loud-or-soft setting then train drivers are to use the setting provided.

Sequence	Volume	When horn is used
H/L	loud	General warning to individuals on or about railway tracks
H	loud	Emergency warning (sounded repeatedly) to individuals on the track or workers who fail to acknowledge a train's presence
L	loud	At whistle boards (between 06:00 and 24:00)
L	soft	Warning signal, in depots or on sidings
H	loud	Special or local signal
H	loud	Wrong-direction movements, against normal railway traffic flow (sounded at frequent intervals)

== Manufacturers ==
=== North America ===
==== AirChime, Ltd. ====
AirChime, Ltd. traces their beginnings through the work of Robert Swanson in 1949. Prior to the early 1950s, locomotives were equipped with air horns that sounded a single note.

Swanson sought to develop an air horn which would mimic the sound of a classic steam whistle. Using ancient Chinese musical theory, Swanson produced the six-note model 'H6'. This was impractical for railroad use, due to its relatively large size. Railroad equipment operates over routes restricted by loading gauge, a difference of only a few inches may prohibit that equipment from operating on the line in question.

Swanson would later refine his 'H6' into the model 'H5'. As the numeric designation indicates, the horn sounds a five-note chord.

In 1950, AirChime introduced the 'M' series, a further improvement on the earlier horns through elimination of unnecessary moving parts. Among the earliest customers of the AirChime 'M' was the Southern Railway, which sought replacement horns for their motive power. The company announced this program through the placement of a full-page advertisement in the May 25, 1951 edition of the Washington Times-Herald.

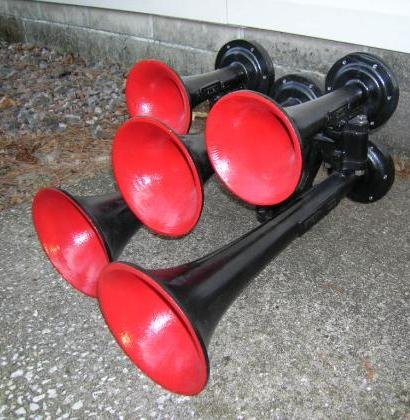
Refurbished Nathan-AirChime model P5A

Under Swanson's guidance, AirChime would focus on ease of mass production, low maintenance, and reliability in their air horn design, with the development of the 'P' (1953), and 'K' (1954) series

AirChime model K3L, shown here in an Auburn University-inspired livery

AirChime has been sold to their American licensee, Nathan Manufacturing, Inc., a division of Micro Precision Group, Inc, in Windham, Connecticut.

==== Buell Air Horns ====
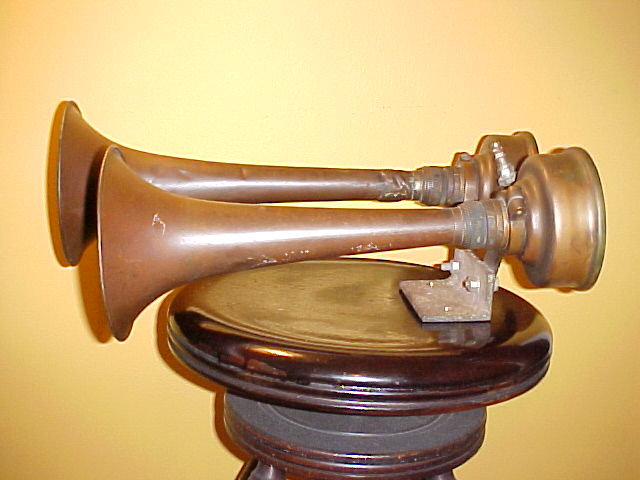
An air horn manufactured by the American Strombos Co., used on early locomotives as well as trucks

Founded in 1912 as The American Strombos Co. of Philadelphia, Buell sold modified marine horns for rail use. They were often installed on small locomotives, electric interurban equipment. and railcars (for example the Doodlebugs).

Buell has recently made available a line of air horns specific for railroad equipment.

==== Gustin Bacon Mfg. Co. ====
The Gustin Bacon Mfg. Co. of Kansas City, Missouri offered airhorns for use on railroad equipment prior to the Second World War.

==== Leslie Controls, Inc. ====
Leslie Controls, Inc., originally the Leslie Company of Lyndhurst, New Jersey, later Parsippany, finally relocating to Tampa, Florida in 1985, began horn production by obtaining the rights to manufacture the Kockums Mekaniska Verkstad product line of "Tyfon" brand airhorns, marketing these for railroad use beginning in the 1930s. Their model A200 series would later grace the rooftops of countless locomotives, such as the legendary Pennsylvania Railroad GG1, as well as thousands of EMD E and F-units. Leslie eventually introduced their own line of multi-note airhorns, known as the "Chime-Tone" series, in direct competition with AirChime.

Poor sales of the Chime-Tones (due to the horns requiring an ample volume of air) led the Leslie Company to introduce a new line of air horns utilizing interchangeable components while using less air to produce greater sound volume than the earlier "Tyfon" series. Developed by Kockums, this horn utilized a back-pressure power chamber design in order to enhance diaphragm oscillation. Known as the "SuperTyfon" series, these horns would eventually supplant the "Tyfon" in railroad service.

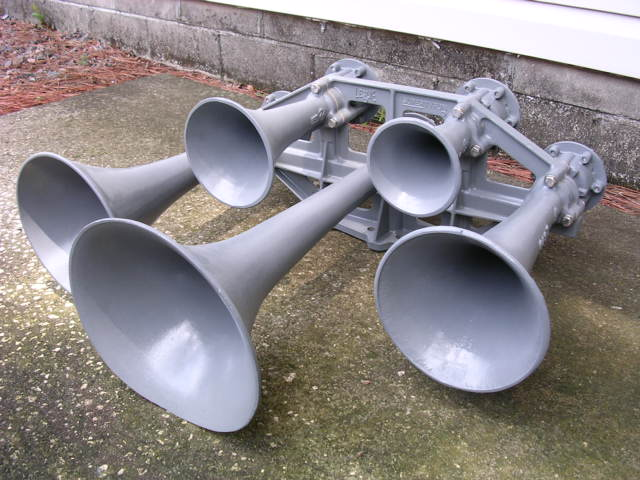
Leslie SuperTyfon model S-5T, regarded by many aficionados as the 'king of horns'

"SuperTyfon" horns were offered in single, dual, triple, quad, and five note configurations.

Leslie Controls continues to manufacture "SuperTyfon" air horns for the railroad industry.

==== Prime Manufacturing, Inc. ====
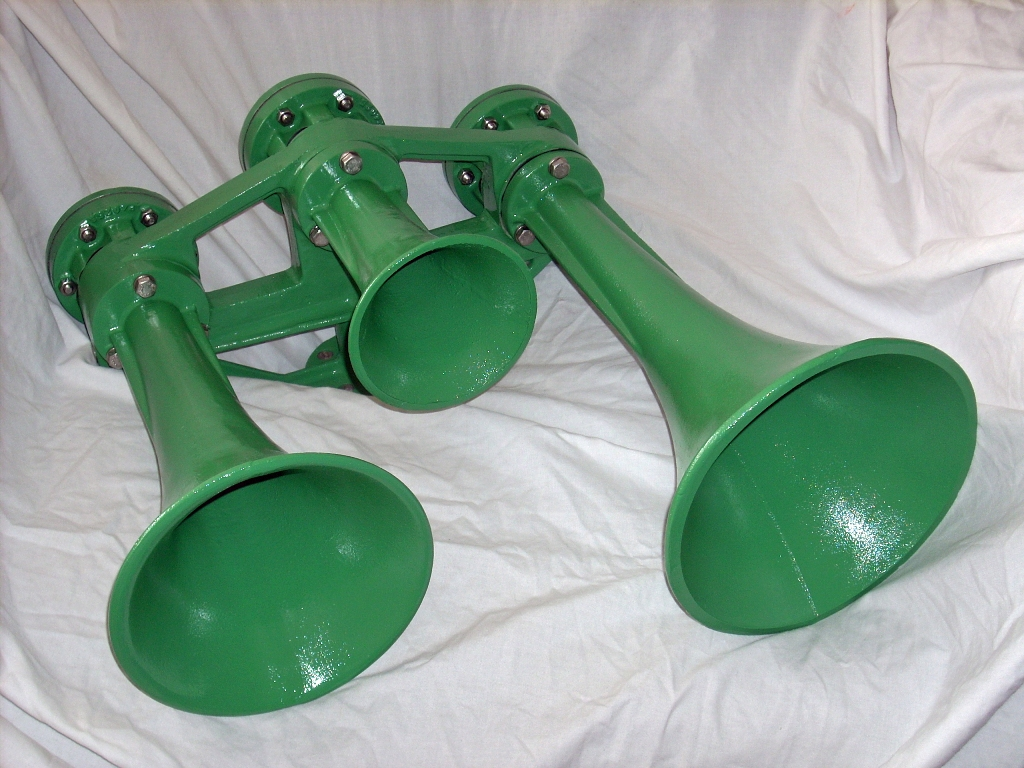
Prime model PM-990 locomotive air horn

Prime Manufacturing, Inc. had produced locomotive appliances for many years prior to their entry into the air horn market in 1972. Their line of "Pneumatic Horns" was basically a derivative of the Leslie SuperTyfon design (having taken advantage of a patent expiration at the time), though their horns employed heavier castings than equivalents from Leslie, and sounding a somewhat richer timbre as a result.

Sales were brisk (railroads such as Union Pacific and the Burlington Northern were notable customers) but ultimately disappointing. Finding themselves increasingly unable to compete in a niche market dominated by Leslie Controls and AirChime, Prime ceased air horn production c. 1999.

==== Westinghouse Air Brake Co. ====
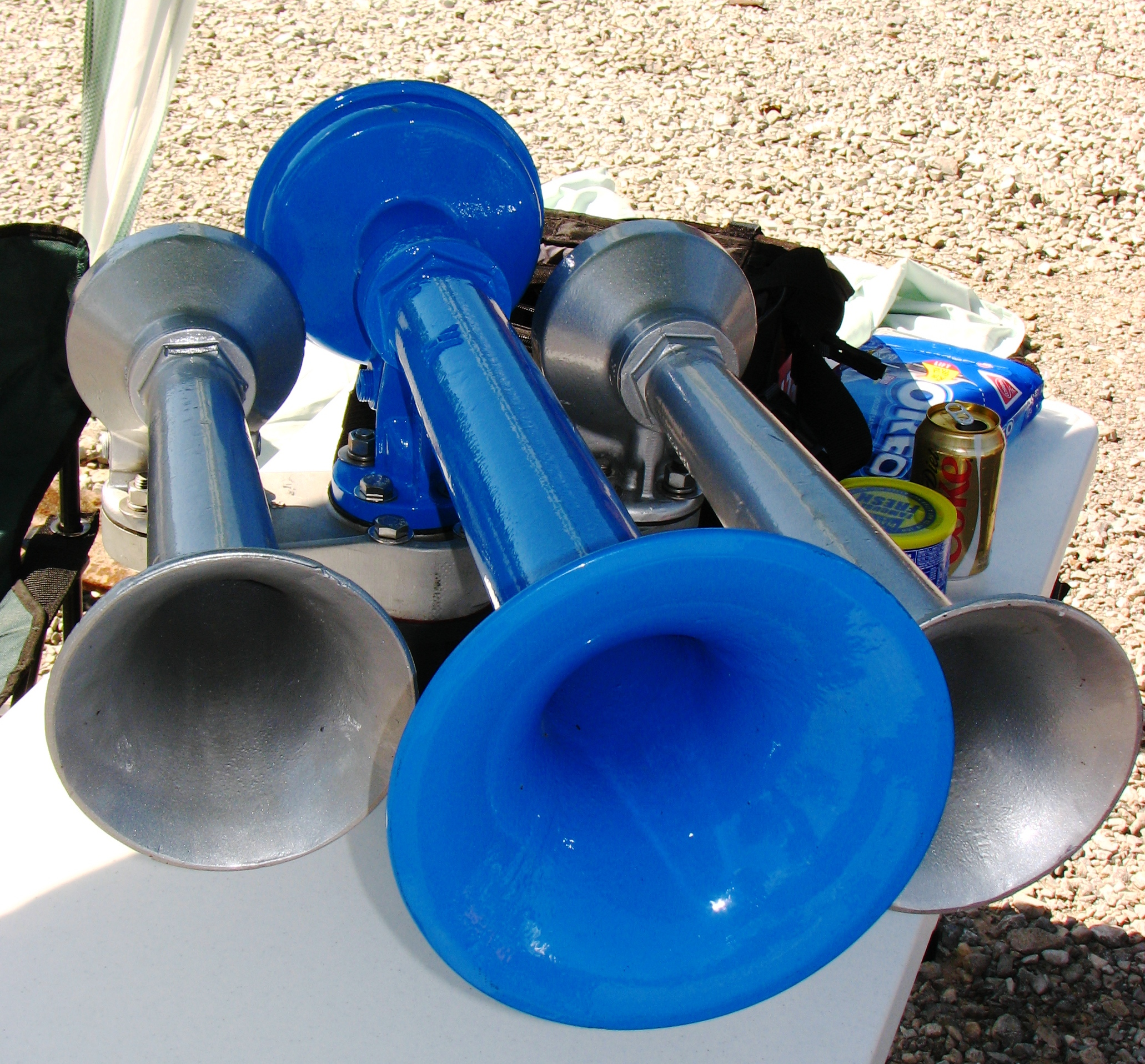
Westinghouse model E2-B1 locomotive air horn consisting of three 'singles' bolted onto a common plate

Westinghouse Air Brake Company (known throughout the 19th and 20th Century as WABCO) was the first to offer air horns specifically for use with railroad equipment, as early as the 1910s. Their model E2 was recognized by many for the deep, commanding tone it produced, and their AA-2 horns were also widely used.

In response to the Leslie multi-note "Chime-Tone" series, Westinghouse offered a bracket to which three of their single-note "honkers" could be bolted, achieving the same result as what the Chime-Tones did for Leslie.

Overshadowed later on by Leslie and AirChime, WABCO eventually ceased production of most horns for the North American market.

At present, the company is known as Wabtec, Inc., and continues to offer their line of 'Pneumatic horns' for the export market.

=== Australia ===
Railways in Australia often utilize the same type of air horns as their North American counterparts.

== See also ==
- Hancock air whistle
- Whistle post
- Air horn
- Foghorn
