= 2024 in New Zealand =

- Decades: 2000s; 2010s; 2020s
- See also: History of New Zealand; List of years in New Zealand; Timeline of New Zealand history

The following lists events that happened during 2024 in New Zealand.

== Incumbents ==
=== Regal and vice-regal ===
- Head of state – Charles III
- Governor-General – Cindy Kiro
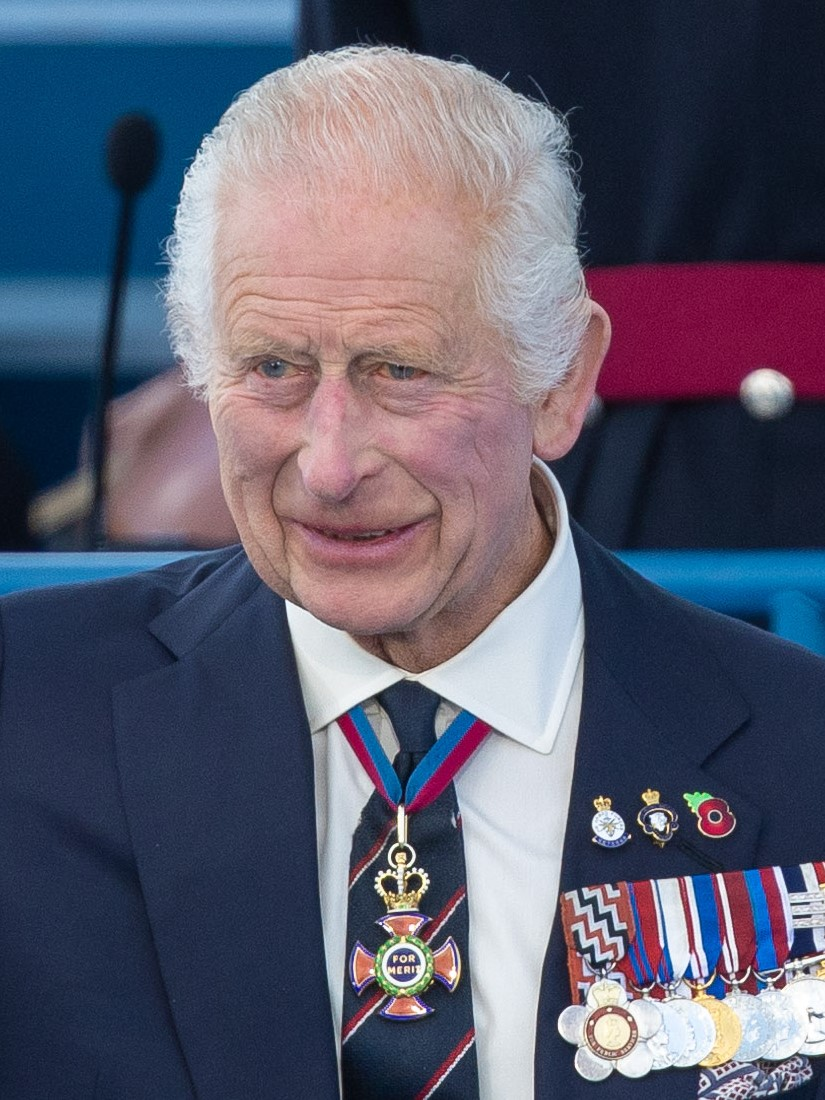
Charles III

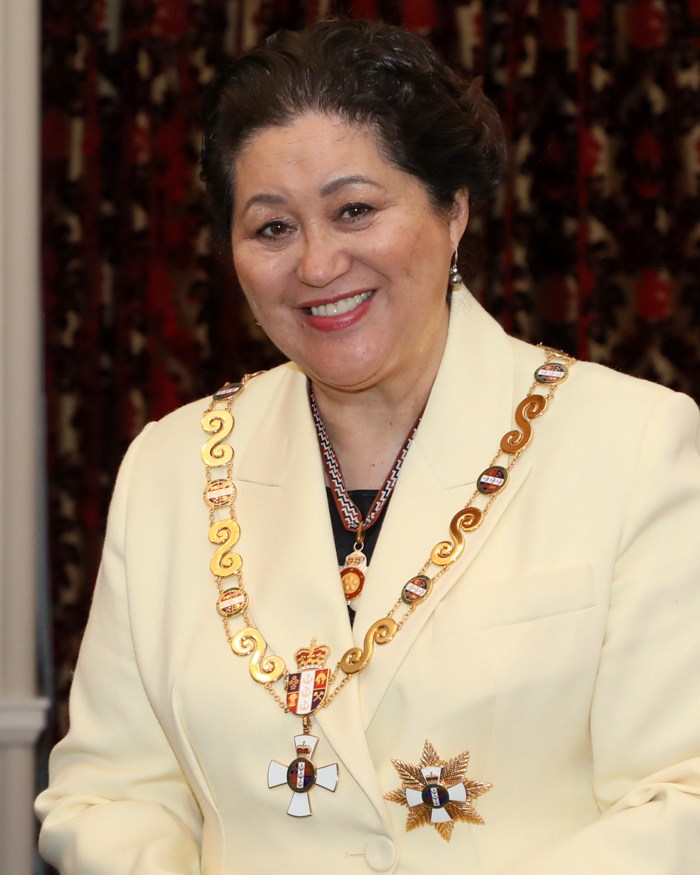
Cindy Kiro

=== Government ===
Legislature term: 54th New Zealand Parliament.

The Sixth National Government, elected in 2023, continues.

- Speaker of the House – Gerry Brownlee
- Prime Minister – Christopher Luxon
- Deputy Prime Minister – Winston Peters
- Leader of the House – Chris Bishop
- Minister of Finance – Nicola Willis
- Minister of Foreign Affairs – Winston Peters
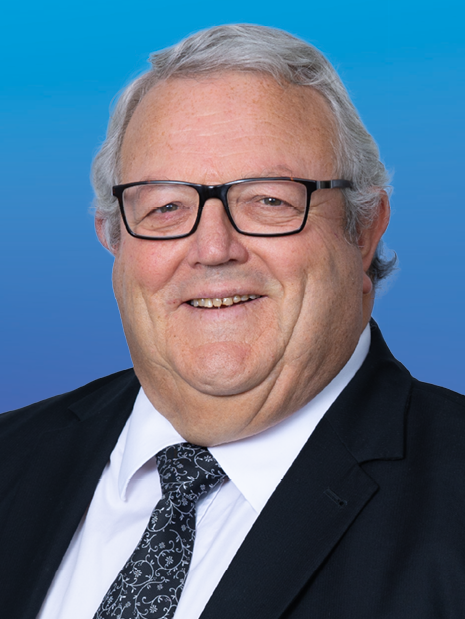
Gerry Brownlee

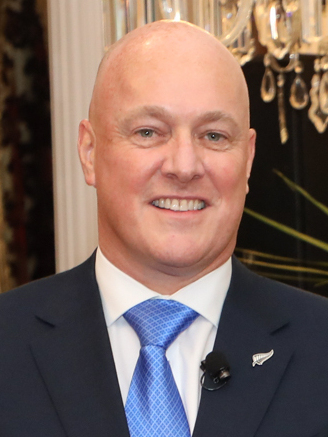
Christopher Luxon

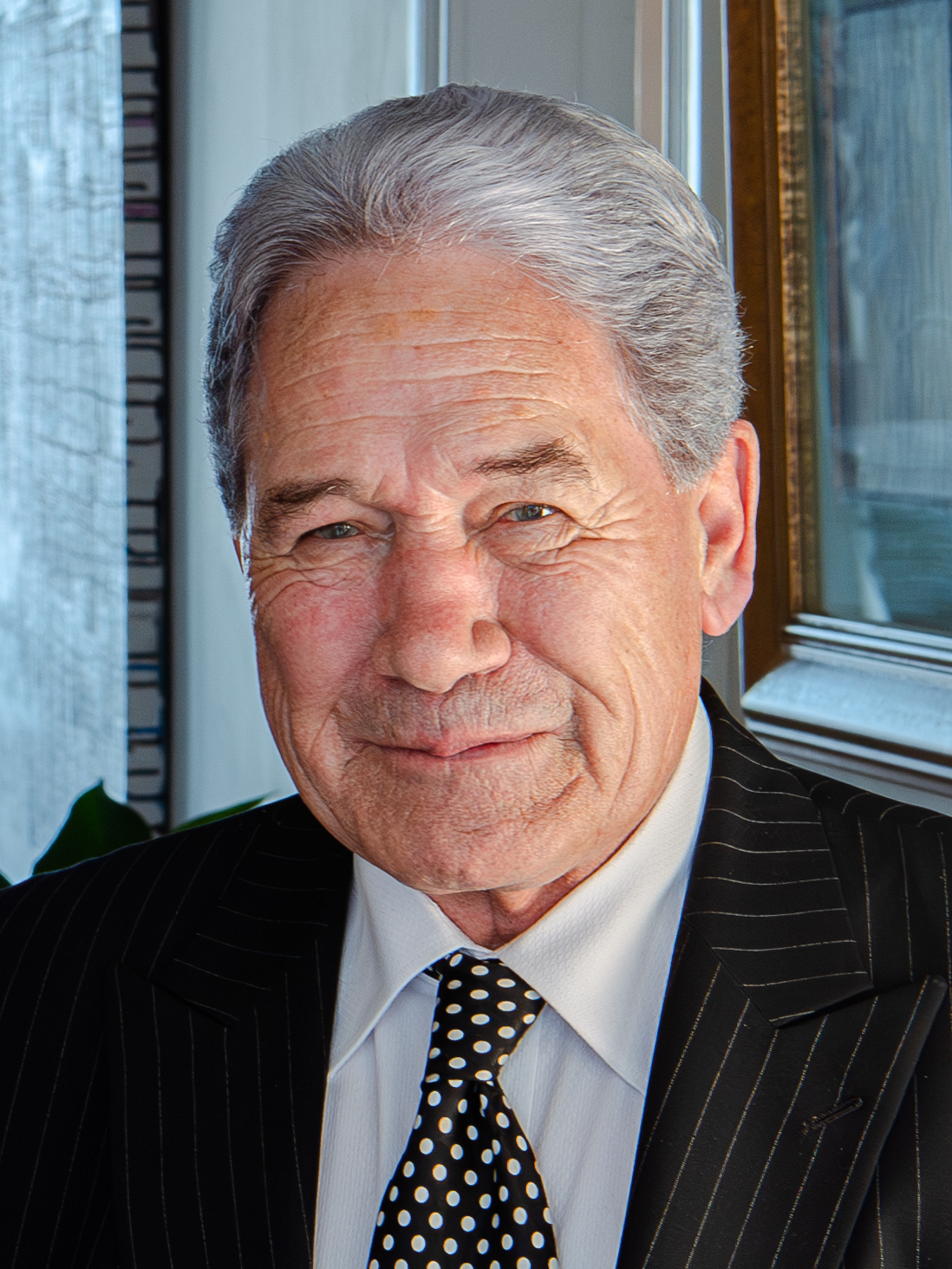
Winston Peters

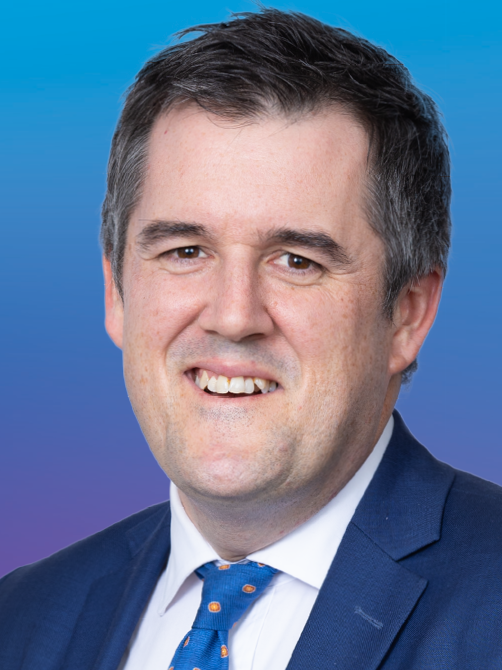
Chris Bishop

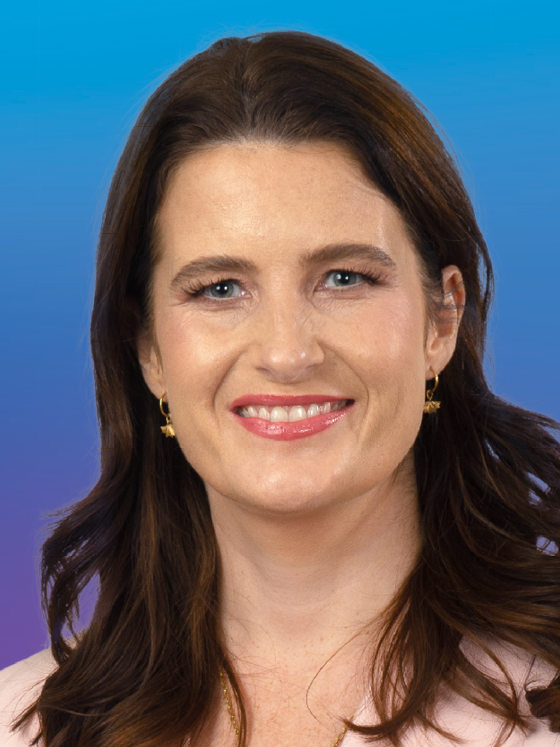
Nicola Willis

=== Other party leaders in parliament ===
- Labour – Chris Hipkins (Leader of the Opposition)
- Green – James Shaw until 10 March then Chlöe Swarbrick, and Marama Davidson
- ACT – David Seymour
- NZ First – Winston Peters
- Te Pāti Māori – Rawiri Waititi and Debbie Ngarewa-Packer
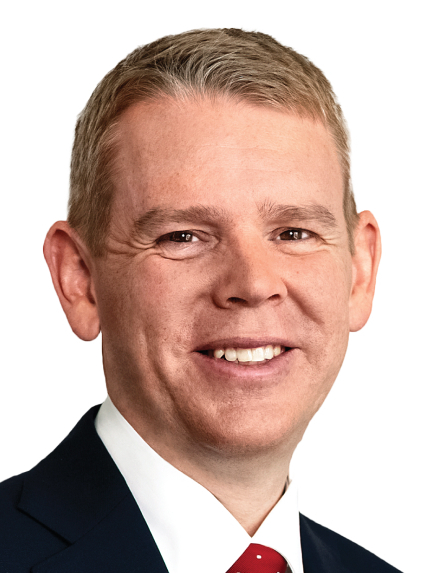
Chris Hipkins

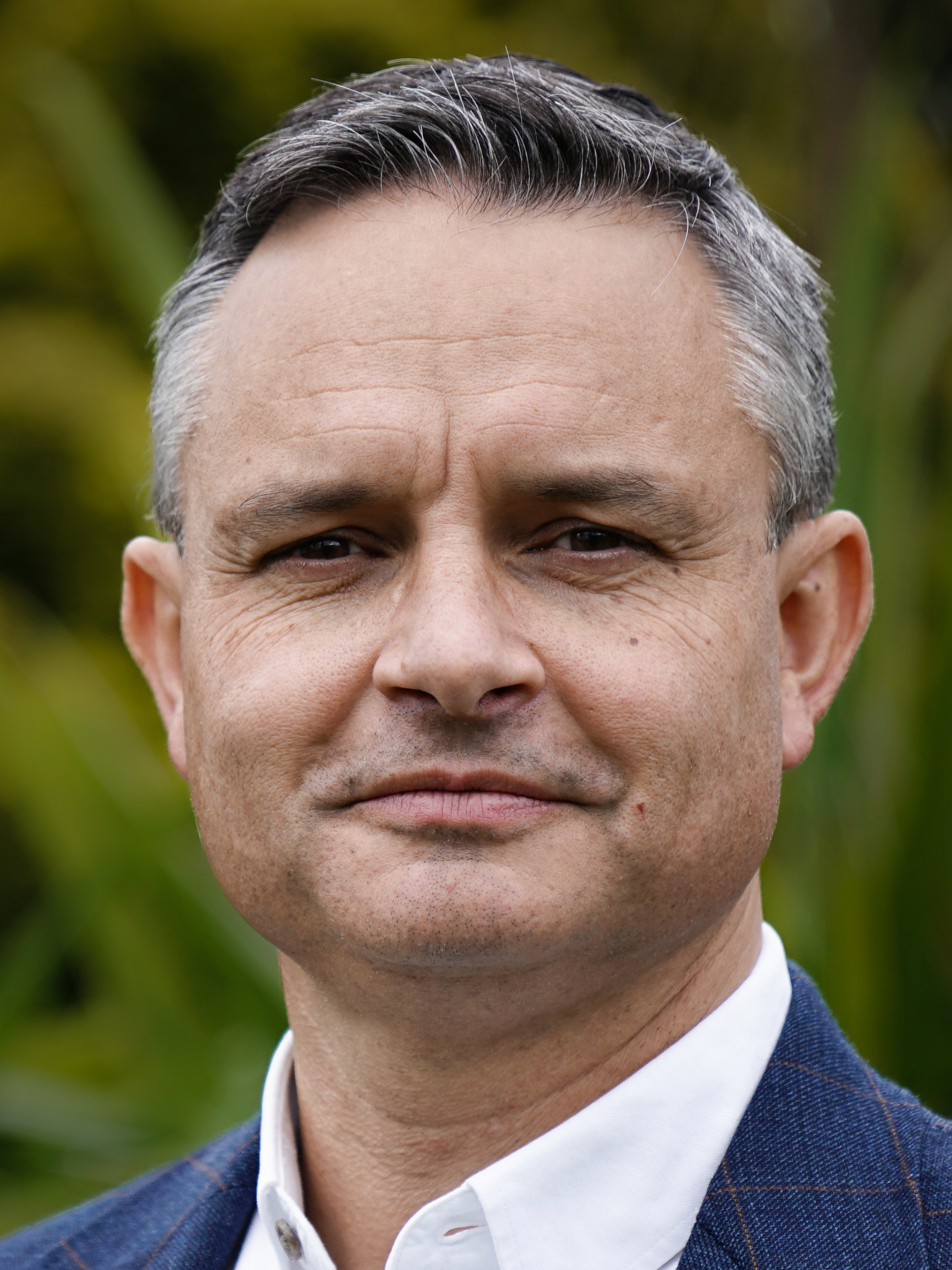
James Shaw

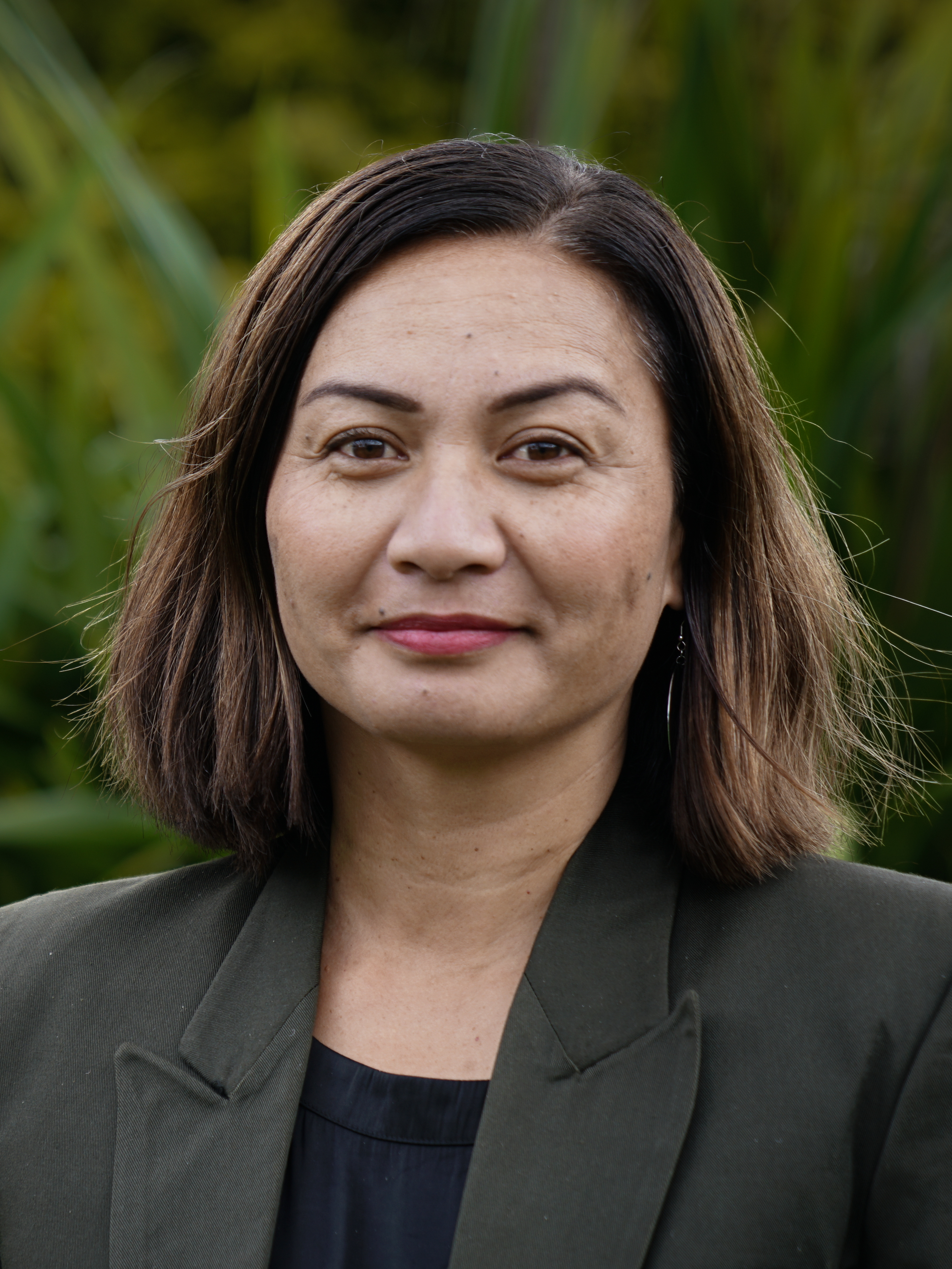
Marama Davidson

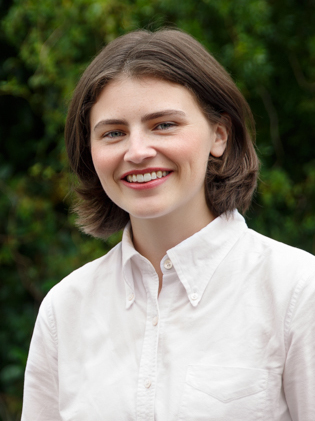
Chlöe Swarbrick

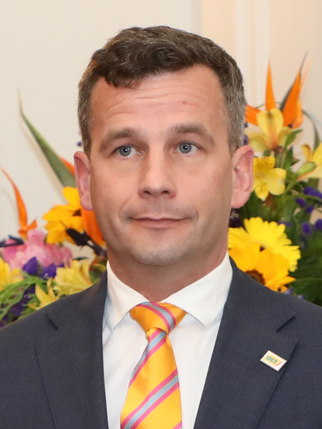
David Seymour

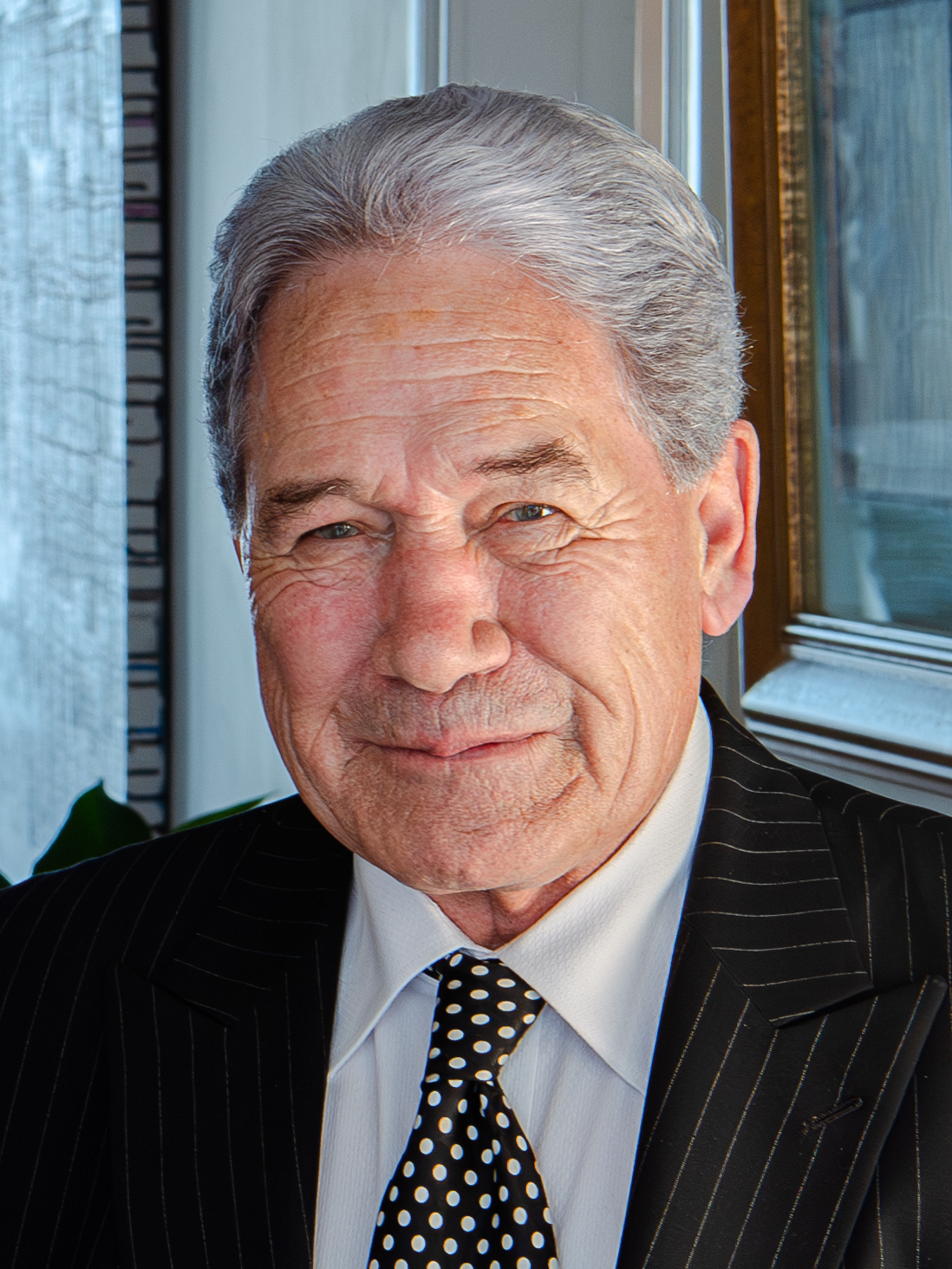
Winston Peters

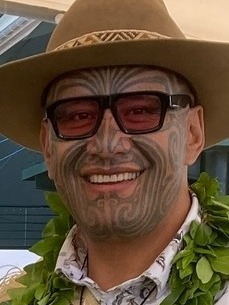
Rawiri Waititi

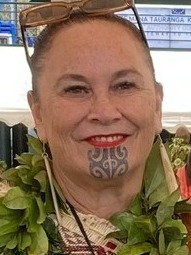
Debbie Ngarewa-Packer

=== Judiciary ===
- Chief Justice – Helen Winkelmann
- President of the Court of Appeal – Mark Cooper, then Christine French from 21 November
- Chief High Court judge – Sally Fitzgerald
- Chief District Court judge – Heemi Taumaunu
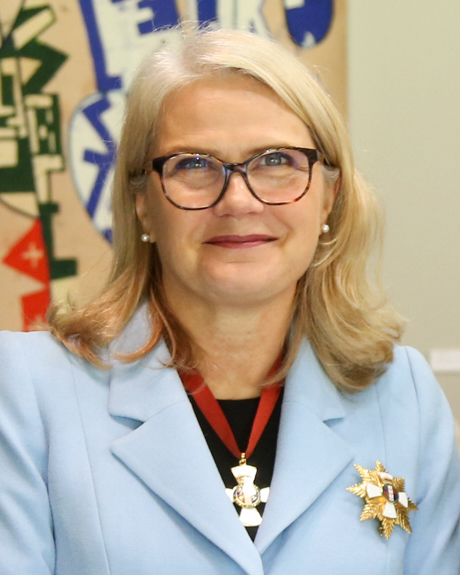
Helen Winkelmann

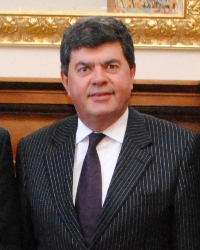
Mark Cooper

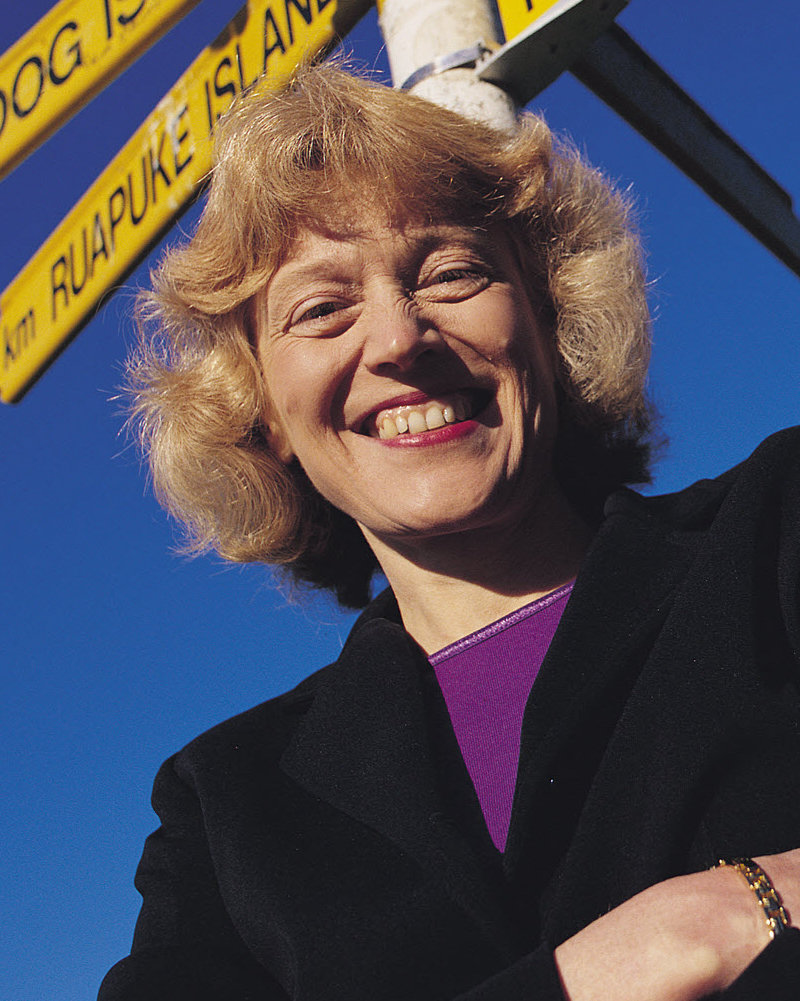
Christine French

Sally Fitzgerald

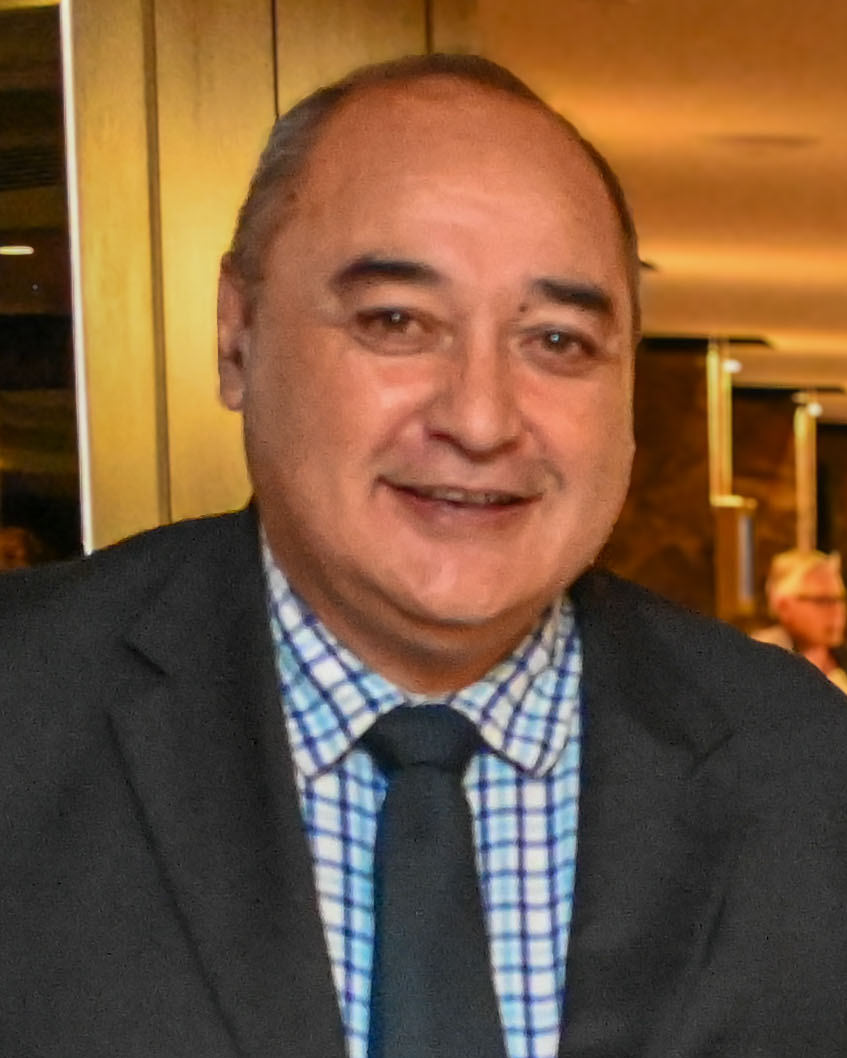
Heemi Taumaunu

=== Main centre leaders ===
- Mayor of Auckland – Wayne Brown
- Mayor of Tauranga – Anne Tolley (as chair of commissioners), then Mahé Drysdale from 2 August
- Mayor of Hamilton – Paula Southgate
- Mayor of Wellington – Tory Whanau
- Mayor of Christchurch – Phil Mauger
- Mayor of Dunedin – Jules Radich
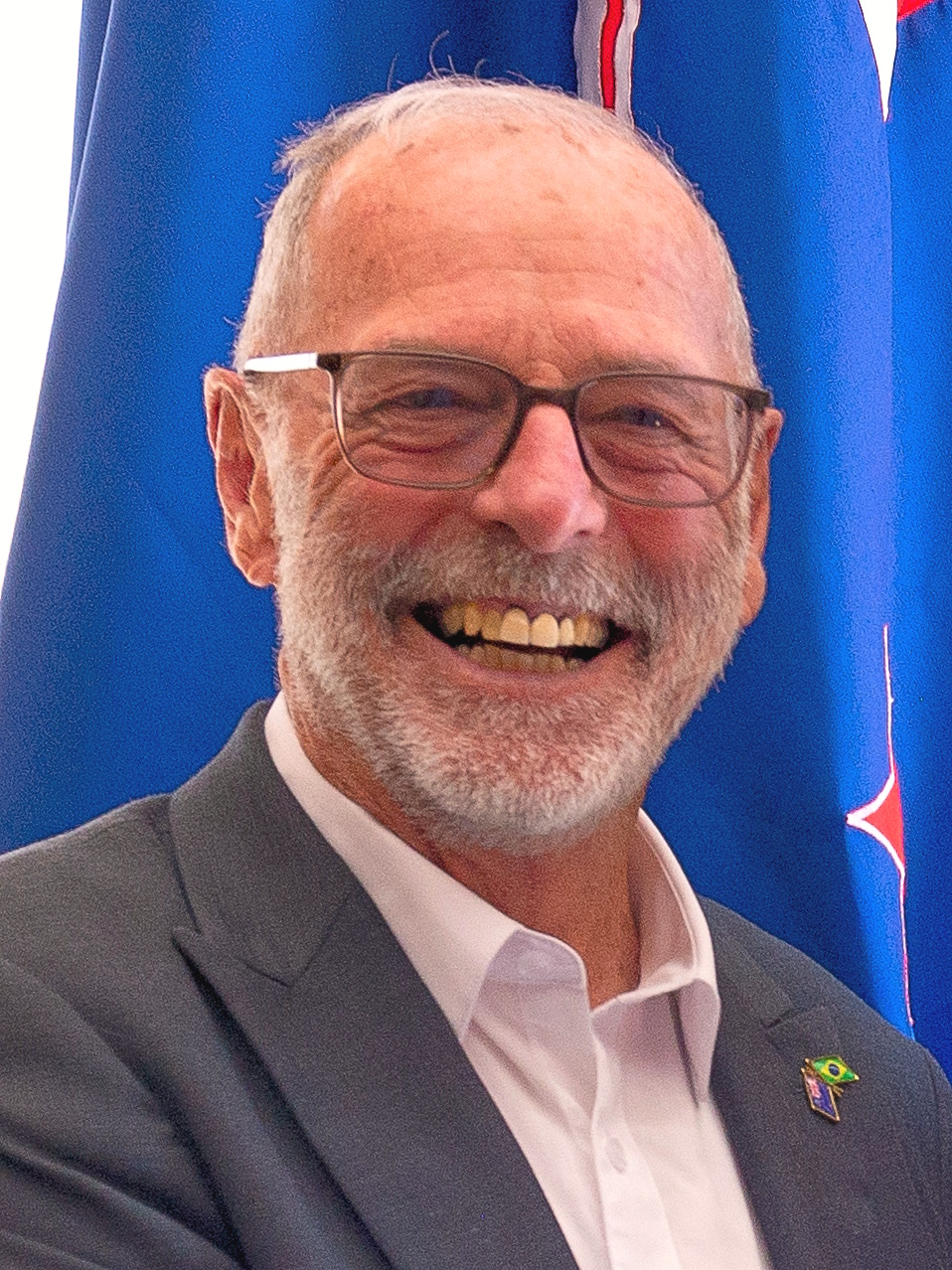
Wayne Brown

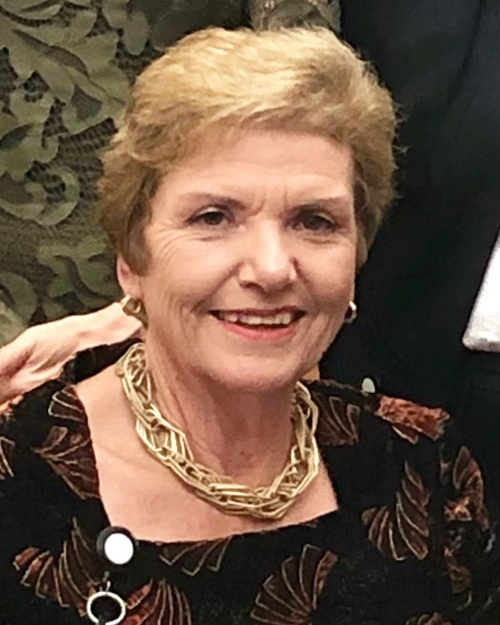
Anne Tolley

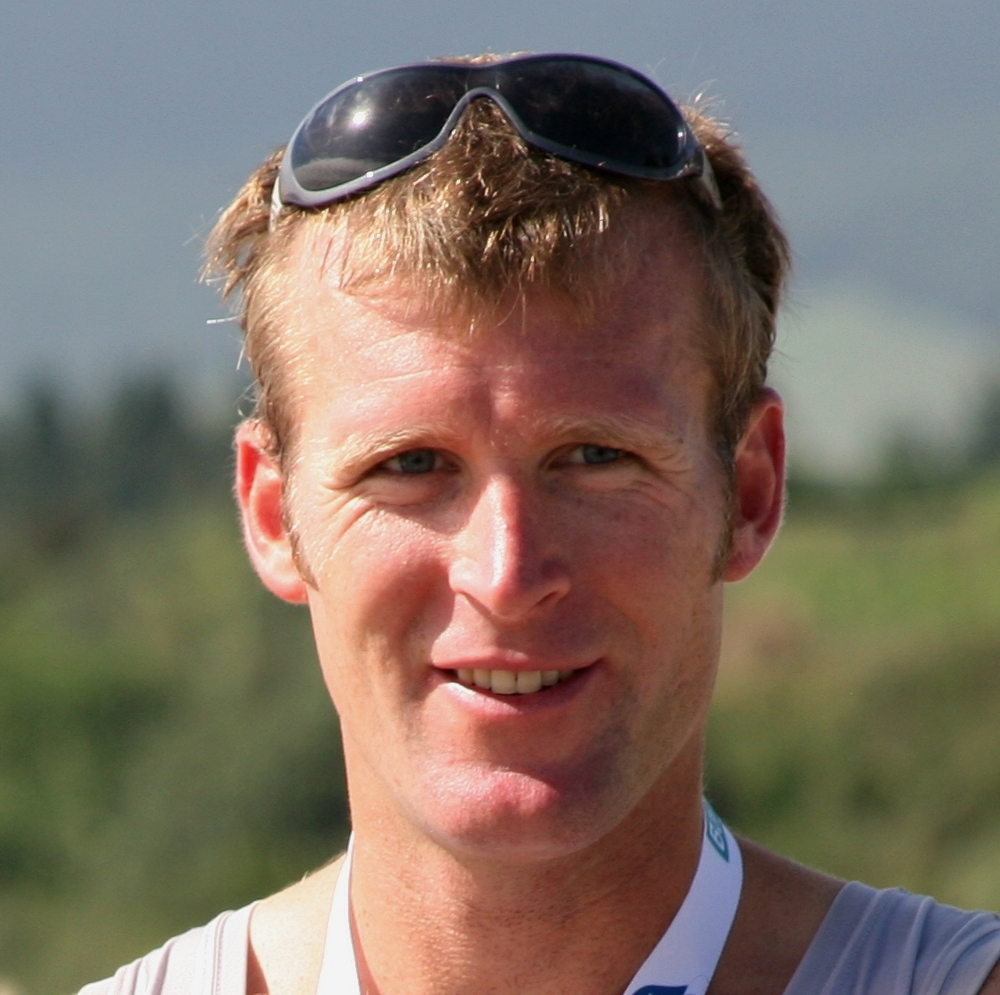
Mahé Drysdale

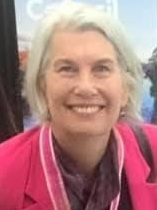
Paula Southgate

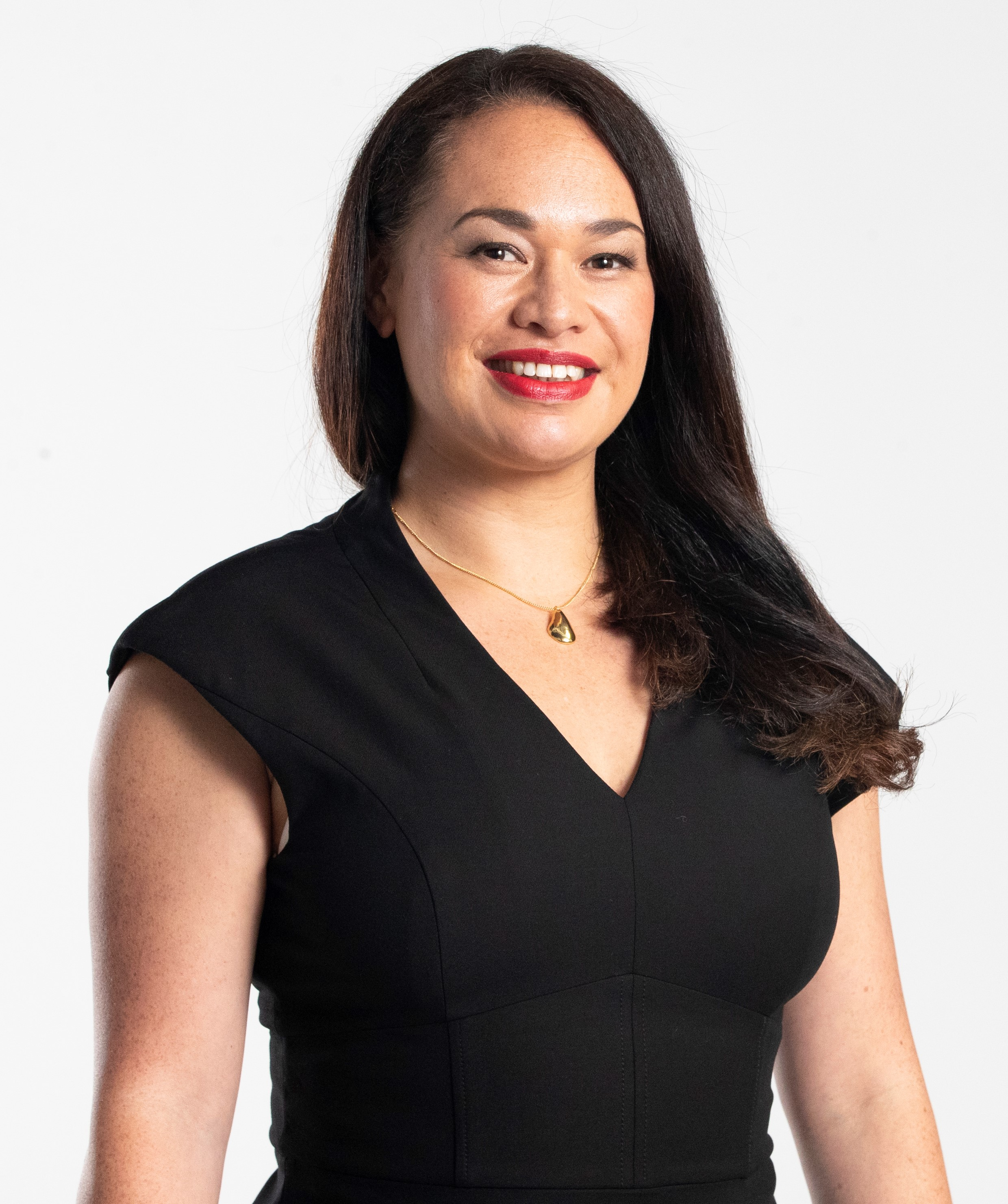
Tory Whanau

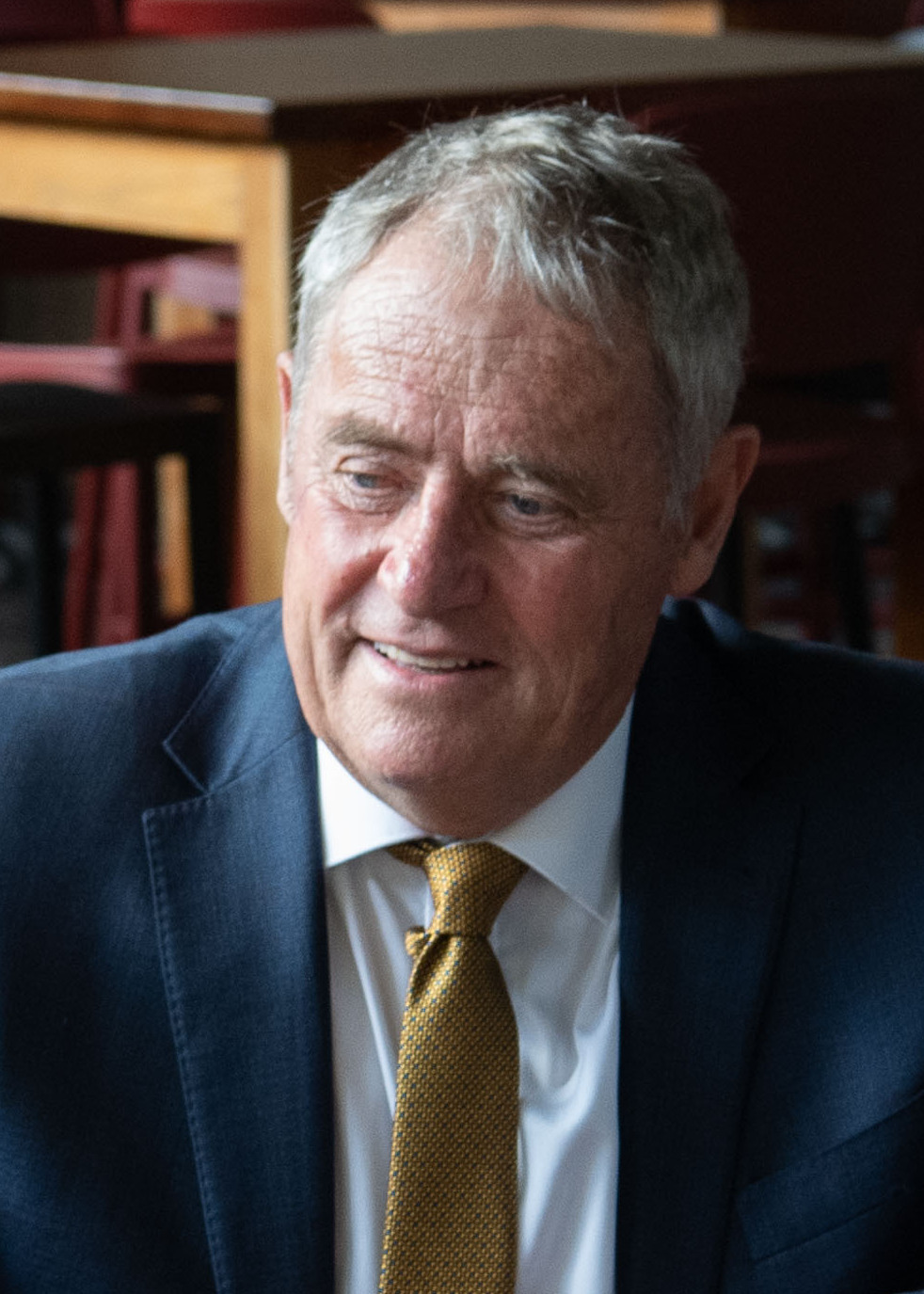
Phil Mauger

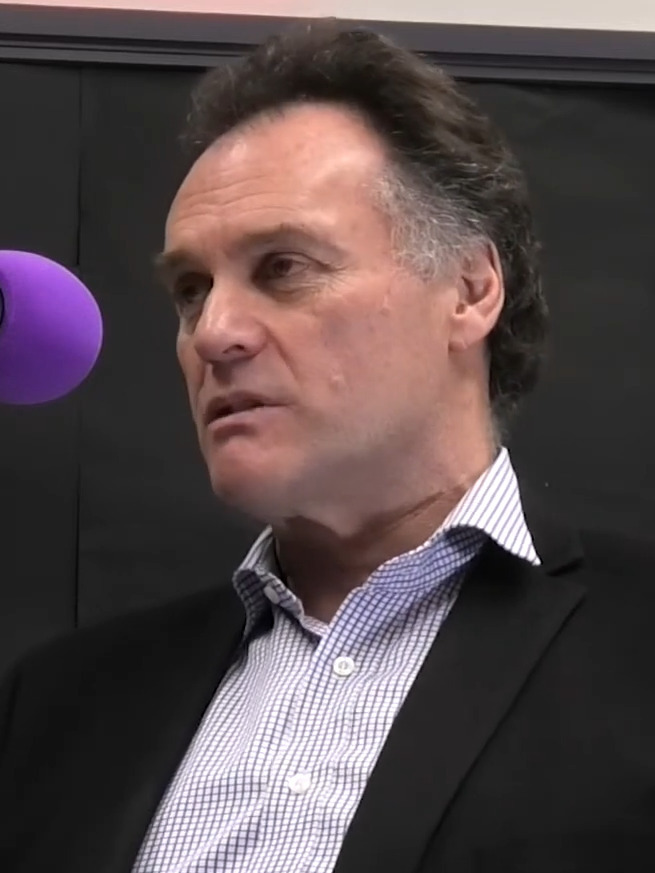
Jules Radich

== Events ==
=== January ===
- 3 January – The Waitangi Treaty Grounds and its museums are evacuated following a bomb threat received in an email.
- 6 January – Learner licence driver tests are changed in order to drop high wait times. Testees must wait 10 days until attempting another test if they fail twice in a day.
- 9 January – A seven-year legal battle concludes, marking three and a half hectares of Titirangi bush to be removed for a water treatment plant.
- 10 January – Train lines in Wellington lose power at around 3pm. Power is restored about six hours later.
- 11 January – 10 hectares of scrub in Tītahi Bay, Porirua is lit on fire, starting at around 11pm. It is contained the following day.
- 14 January – The Auckland Light Rail project is cancelled by the government. The project oversaw building light rail system in Auckland.
- 15 January
  - Train stations on Auckland's Eastern Line between Ōrākei and Sylvia Park reopen after being closed for 10 months to allow tracks to be rebuilt.
  - Prime Minister Christopher Luxon meets with the Māori King, Kīngi Tūheitia. Their discussions include the government's plans to remove Māori names from public organisations.
- 16 January – Golriz Ghahraman announces her resignation as a Green Party Member of Parliament following three accusations of shoplifting in Auckland and Wellington.
- 17 January
  - Wellington enters level two water restrictions due to its ageing infrastructure during summer demand spikes. Almost half of Wellington's water is lost to over 3,000 pipe leaks. The restrictions enact a ban of residential sprinklers and irrigation sprinklers in Wellington City, Porirua City, Hutt City and Upper Hutt City.
  - 2023 NCEA results are revealed, showing a drop in secondary school pass rates for the third year in a row. This is attributed to the COVID-19 pandemic.
  - MetService issues a heat alert in Auckland due to night temperatures forecasted at 20–21 degrees.
- 19 January
  - Four separate wildfires break out in Amberley and Loburn, Canterbury, reaching an estimated area of 10 hectares. The fires are contained in the evening by over 100 firefighters. Three homes and a church are lost in the fires.
  - Celia Wade-Brown is declared elected a list MP for the Green Party following the resignation of Golriz Ghahraman.
  - Westland declares a state of emergency due to heavy rain.
- 20 January
  - A national hui is held at Tūrangawaewae Marae, called by the Māori King Tūheitia Paki, which has several thousand attendees.
  - A second wildfire on the north side of the Waimakariri River, by Swannanoa breaks out, reaching an estimated area of 12 hectares. Forty firefighters and four helicopters are used to fight the fire.
- 21 January – A pod of 40 false killer whales and bottlenose dolphins were euthanised after becoming stranded on a reef near Māhia Peninsula in the Hawke's Bay region.
- 22 January – The Commerce Commission launches investigations into pricing and promotional practices of the two supermarket chains Woolworths and Foodstuffs.
- 23 January – The New Zealand Defence Force deploys six personnel to assist the United States-led coalition in countering the Houthi movement's attacks on international shipping in the Red Sea following the Gaza war.
- 24 January
  - Albert Park in Auckland is evacuated along with surrounding streets after a man made "concerning comments".
  - Waipukurau water supply drops to 26% due to a leak. Level four water restrictions are put in place, banning outdoor water use, and residents are asked not to use dishwashers or washing machines.
- 26 January
  - Local Government Minister Simeon Brown says that the government does not want to decrease the voting age to 16, after a similar comment was made on 16 January. This ends the previous government's intention to decrease the age.
  - Members of the Ngāti Kahu iwi (tribe) block access to Taipa ahead of the Doubtless Bay Fishing Competition to protest the Government's proposed Treaty of Waitangi Principles legislation and overfishing. Protesters vowed to continue their blockade over the weekend (27–28 January).
- 30 January
  - James Shaw, co-leader of the Green Party of Aotearoa New Zealand announces his resignation, effective March.
  - New Zealand suspends its aid contribution to UNRWA (the United Nations Relief and Works Agency for Palestinian Refugees in the Near East) following allegations that at least 12 UNRWA workers had participated in the 2023 Hamas-led attack on Israel.
- 31 January
  - The government announces that the ending of providing free COVID-19 rapid antigen test kits will be extended to 30 June.
  - A heat alert is issued for Auckland, and outdoor fires are banned in Canterbury.

=== February ===
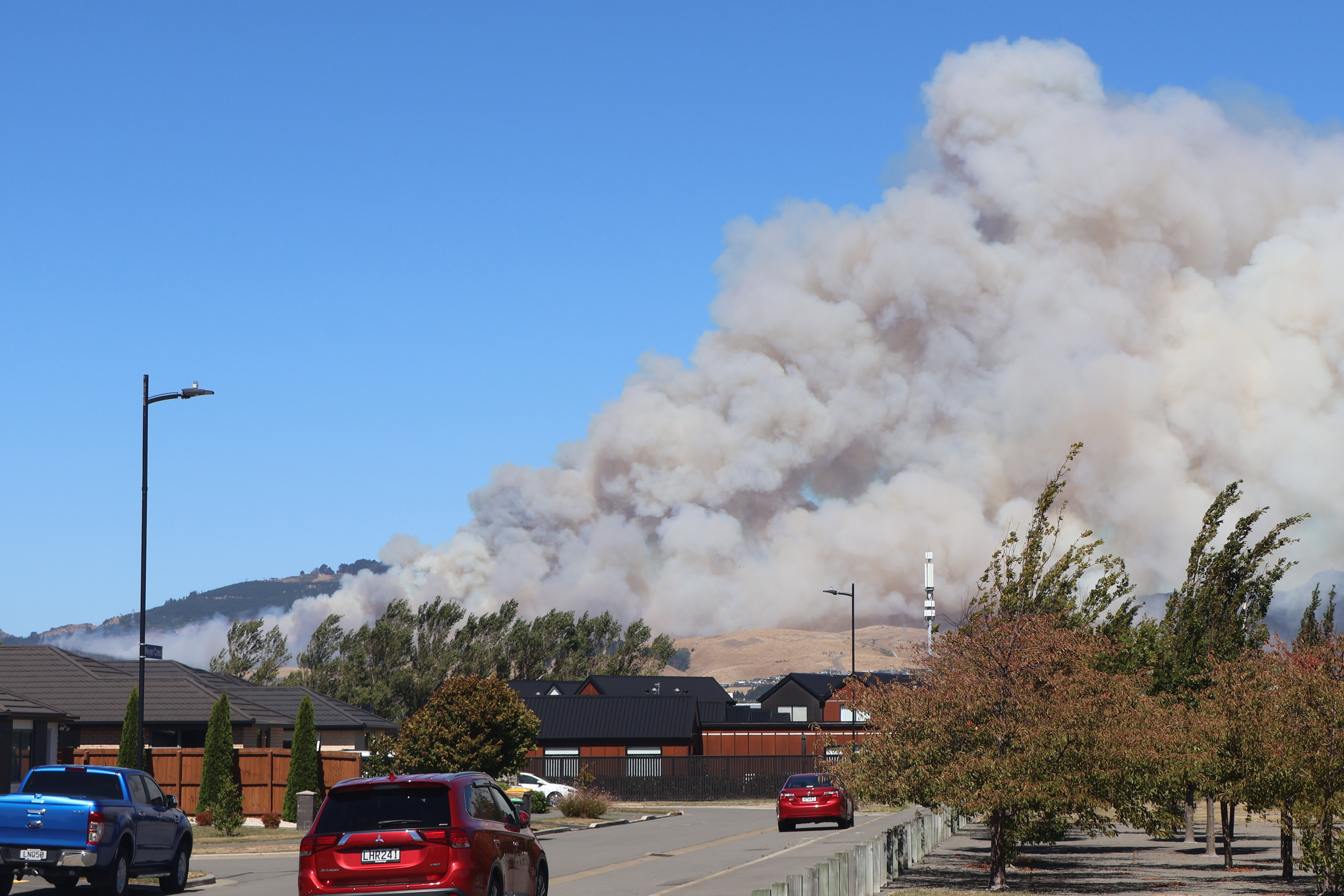
The Port Hills fire

- 4 February – A wildfire along the banks of the Waimakariri River near Kirwee reaches 80 hectares in size, leading to evacuations and the closure of Old West Coast Road.
- 5 February – Rangiora High School closes for one day due to a high COVID-19 infection rate among its staff.
- 6 February – Large crowds gather outside Treaty House in Waitangi, Northland, to protest against the Government's Māori language policies and proposed Treaty Principles legislation.
- 7 February – Supreme Court rules that iwi leader and climate activist Mike Smith can sue seven companies for pollution including Fonterra, Z Energy and Genesis Energy Limited.
- 8 February – Local state of emergency declared in the Southland township of Bluecliffs due to erosion caused by heavy rain and sea swell.
- 10 February
  - Westpac experiences an outage in which customers are unable to withdraw funds and use eftpos cards for more than 12 hours.
  - A South Dunedin Countdown supermarket closes for at least a week, after suffering a rodent infestation.
- 11 February – The government announces a $63 million funding increase for Cyclone Gabrielle recovery, to remove sediment and debris.
- 12 February – The Ministry of Primary Industries starts an investigation at a Christchurch Countdown supermarket, after a mouse is spotted running across an uncovered deli-made salad.
- 13 February – A memorial service is held at Muriwai to remember the death of two firefighters during Cyclone Gabrielle. A plaque was also unveiled.
- 14 February
  - 2024 Port Hills fire: A state of emergency is declared in Christchurch and Selwyn, as firefighters battle to control a bushfire in the city's Port Hills region.
  - Six residents of a rest home in Whitianga have died after a third of residents and staff were infected with Influenza A over a 12-day period.
  - Parliament repeals under urgency the Three Waters programme.
- 20 February:
  - Labour Member of Parliament and former cabinet minister Grant Robertson announces his resignation from politics to take up the position of Vice-Chancellor of the University of Otago commencing July 2024.
  - Thousands of shortfin eels are found dead in the Low Burn Stream near Mataura, Southland.
- 21 February – Green MP Efeso Collins collapses and dies during a charity event.
- 24 February – The new Kaeo Bridge in Northland opens after starting in 2021 and being unveiled in 2015.
- 25 February – Food labels now must contain potentially life-threatening allergens bolded in the ingredients list.
- 26 February – State Highway 1 over Brynderwyn Hills closes for repairs until 27 March.
- 28 February
  - Parliament passes legislation under urgency repealing the Smokefree Environments and Regulated Products (Smoked Tobacco) Amendment Act 2022 and disestablishing Te Aka Whai Ora (the Māori Health Authority).
  - The official cash rate is kept at 5.5%.
  - Warner Bros. Discovery releases a proposal to shut down television news broadcaster Newshub by 30 June 2024.
- 29 February
  - Petrol stations Z, Allied Petroleum, Gull, Waitomo, etc. experience nationwide self-service pump outages due to a software problem caused by the leap year.
  - New Zealand Blood Service lifts the mad cow disease blood and plasma donation restriction.
  - The entirety of Hamas is designated as a terrorist entity by the government, which follows a 2010 designation of its military as terrorist.

=== March ===
- 1 March – Judge Evangelos Thomas imposes a total of NZ$10.21 million in reparations and NZ$2 million in fines on five companies and GNS Science over their involvement in the 2019 Whakaari / White Island eruption.
- 5 March:
  - Parliament votes to end taxpayer funding for cultural reports.
  - New Zealand Media and Entertainment acquires Tauranga-based media company SunMedia.
- 6 March – Lawrence Xu-Nan is elected as a list MP for the Green Party following the death of Efeso Collins.
- 8 March – State-owned television news broadcaster TVNZ proposes eliminating 68 jobs and axing several current affairs programs including Fair Go, Sunday, 1News' midday and late night news segments due to financial difficulties.
- 9 March – The Hokitika Wildfoods Festival takes place.
- 10 March
  - Chlöe Swarbrick is elected co-leader of the Green Party, following the resignation of James Shaw.
  - Firefighters respond to multiple wildfires in the Waitaki District.
- 11 March – 50 passengers and crew are injured after LATAM Airlines Flight 800 experiences an inflight upset while landing at Auckland Airport.
- 12 March
  - Scientists on an expedition to the Bounty Trough discover more than a hundred species previously unknown in New Zealand waters.
  - New Zealand Media and Entertainment acquires the family-owned Gisborne Herald and its website.
- 13 March
  - Golriz Ghahraman pleads guilty to shoplifting.
  - The government gives Ruapehu Alpine Lifts a $7 million bailout.
- 14 March
  - The Wellington City Council approves a plan to increase housing density in Wellington.
  - The Dunedin City Council votes to consult ratepayers on a proposal to sell energy company Aurora Energy in order to pay off the company's forecast debt of NZ$750 million.
- 15 March – World of Music, Arts and Dance takes place in New Plymouth.
- 17 March – Deputy Prime Minister and New Zealand First leader Winston Peters controversially likens Co-governance to Nazi race-based theory during a state of the nation address. His remarks were described as offensive and inflammatory by Holocaust Centre of NZ spokesperson Ben Kepes and Labour Party leader Chris Hipkins.
- 19 March – The Rotorua Lakes Council cancels a scheduled Coco and Erika Flash Drag Queen Story Hour event due to safety concerns.
- 20 March – The government announces that it will ban disposable vapes, and increase the maximum fine from selling to under-18s from $10,000 to $100,000.
- 21 March
  - It is announced that the country has entered a recession, with a GDP drop of 0.1% following a 0.3% drop in the September 2023 quarter.
  - A meteorite is discovered in Mackenzie Country after it hit the ground on 13 March. It is the country's first meteorite to be recovered in 20 years, and is the country's tenth recovered meteorite.
- 22 March – MediaWorks New Zealand confirms that a hacker has compromised the personal information of 403,000 individuals who had participated in its online competitions.
- 24 March – Two people are killed and three critically wounded following a street brawl involving 100 people in Gisborne.
- 26 March
  - NZ Post confirms plans to lay off 750 workers over the next five years due to declining mail volume.
  - Members of Destiny Church protest against Erika and Coco Flash's Drag Queen reading event at the Gisborne library.
  - The Hastings District Council cancels an upcoming Erika and CoCo Flash Rainbow Story event due to safety concerns.
- 27 March:
  - The 2024 New Zealander of the Year Awards are announced, with climate scientist Jim Salinger named New Zealander of the Year.
  - The New Zealand Parliament passes major tax legislation restoring interest deductibility for residential investment property, reducing the bright-line test for residential property, and eliminating depreciation deductions for commercial and industrial buildings.
- 28 March:
  - The Government halts work on legislation to create an ocean sanctuary around the Kermadec Islands.
  - Parliament passes legislation requiring electric cars and plug-in hybrids to pay road user charges.
- 29–31 March – The 2024 Warbirds over Wanaka airshow is held, with 64,800 people attending.

=== April ===
- 1 April
  - The minimum wage is increased from $22.70 to $23.15 an hour.
  - Pharmacies become permitted to vaccinate children under the age of five.
  - Electric and hybrid electric vehicles under 3.5 tonnes now have to pay road user charges, after previously being exempt.
- 4 April – The New Zealand Government announces that local councils will have to hold referendums on Māori wards and constituencies.
- 5 April – Thousands of students participate in 20 "climate strikes" events across the country.
- 7 April – Changes to the Accredited Employer Worker Visa are announced due to 'unsustainable' immigration levels.
- 9 April – TVNZ confirms its decision to discontinue its consumer affairs programme Fair Go, along with its midday and late night news bulletins.
- 10 April
  - The OCR remains at 5.5%.
  - Heavy rain in the West Coast causes the closure of State Highway 6 and power outages due to three power poles being knocked down. Sandbags are placed in some places in Hokitika. 46 Air New Zealand flights are cancelled.
  - TVNZ confirms its decision to cancel its current affairs programme Sunday.
  - Warner Bros. Discovery confirms its decision to shut down its Newshub news service by 5 July.
- 12 April
  - A pier on a rail bridge over the Rangitata River gets washed away due to heavy rain, causing the bridge to sag.
  - 52 Air New Zealand flights are cancelled due to bad weather and "engineering issues".
  - The government pledges $8.2 million to the Pacific Connect cable and a further $8.2 million to fund building a Pacific oceans and fisheries research vessel.
- 16 April
  - The Commerce Commission brings One NZ to the High Court for allegedly breaching the 111 Contact Code, which was made to allow customers to contact emergency services during a power outage.
  - Media companies Warner Bros. Discovery and Stuff announce an agreement to replace Newshub with a 6pm news bulletin provided by Stuff.
- 17 April
  - The Ministry of Education and Oranga Tamariki (Ministry of Children) announce significant job cuts to meet Government budget savings targets of up to 7.5%.
  - Organisers of the New Zealand A&P Agricultural Show announce that the 2024 event will not go ahead, citing financial issues.
  - Members of the New Zealand Police Association vote to reject the Government's latest pay offer, which includes an overtime rate, NZ$1,500 cash payment and a pay increase for the third year.
- 23 April – The Wellington City Council cancels a NZ$32 million agreement with cinema chain Reading Cinemas to refurbish and earthquake-strengthen its Wellington building.
- 24 April – Paul Goldsmith replaces Melissa Lee as the Media and Communications Minister, and Penny Simmonds has her Disability Issues portfolio removed. Lee is removed from cabinet and is replaced by Simon Watts. In a statement, Luxon referenced issues in the media sector and "major financial issues with programmes run by the Ministry of Disabled People".
- 25 April – The Rangitata River rail bridge in the Canterbury Region reopens after damage from severe weather two weeks earlier.
- 28 April – A protest of several hundred people occurs in Petone to oppose council's proposed demolition of Petone Wharf after it was closed in 2021 due to earthquake damage.
- 29 April
  - The government increases Pharmac funding by $1.7 billion over the next four years, increasing it to $6.3 billion.
  - The government's school cellphone ban comes into force on the first day of Term Two.
  - The first Popeyes restaurant in New Zealand opens.
  - NZTA launches a mobile app which serves several functions, such as paying vehicle registrations and road user charges.

=== May ===
- 1 May – The government stops funding public transport fares which make trips free for children, and half price for people under 25.
- 2 May – The former Australian Foreign Minister, Bob Carr, says he will take 'legal action', after Winston Peters makes remarks on his views on the AUKUS arrangement.
- 3 May – The Wairoa Star newspaper ends after 103 years of publication.
- 5 May – Environment Canterbury Chair Cr Peter Scott steps down after admitting to illegal irrigation during a Newstalk ZB radio interview.
- 7 May
  - Green Party MP Julie Anne Genter is referred to the New Zealand Parliament's privileges committee following complaints that she intimidated National Party's MP Matt Doocey during a heated parliamentary exchange.
  - Junior doctors hold a nationwide strike and pickets to protest pay cuts in several healthcare sectors.
  - Mayor of Auckland Wayne Brown abandons plans to sell the Ports of Auckland, which will remain in the hands of the Auckland Council.
  - The Whanganui District Council votes to call for a permanent ceasefire in Gaza in response to the Gaza war.
- 10 May
  - The Employment Relations Authority orders public broadcaster TVNZ to enter into mediation with the E tū union over staff redundancies caused by cutbacks to several news and current affairs programmes.
  - Penguin Random House New Zealand cuts eight roles as part of a major restructure.
- 11 May – Transpower issues a power grid emergency in anticipation of an extreme geomagnetic storm, which was the most intense solar storm since 2003. As a precaution, several transmission lines are disabled. Aurorae are visible as far north as Auckland.
- 12 May – TVNZ's current affairs show Sunday airs its final episode after being broadcast for 22 years.
- 13 May
  - New Zealand Court of Appeals overturns a High Court decision squashing the Waitangi Tribunal's summons to Children's Minister Karen Chhour to testify at a hearing about the Government's proposed legislation to overturn Section 7AA of the Oranga Tamariki Act 1989.
  - TVNZ airs the final episode of its consumer affairs programme Fair Go after being broadcast for 47 years.
- 14 May
  - The Department of Internal Affairs apologises for lengthy delays in processing New Zealand passport applications.
  - Warner Bros. Discovery cancels the reality television series The Block NZ after being broadcast for 12 years.
- 16 May
  - Junior doctors stage a second strike to protest for better pay and working conditions.
  - Dairy company Fonterra announces plans to sell its global consumer business and 17 manufacturing sites in New Zealand and overseas as part of a shift towards becoming a global business-to-business supplier of dairy nutritition products.
- 21 May
  - National Party MP David MacLeod is suspended by Prime Minister Christopher Luxon from his Environment and Finance select committee roles after failing to declare 19 candidate donations worth NZ$178,000.
  - Heavy rainfall nationwide leads to flash flooding in Auckland, the Bay of Plenty and Christchurch.
  - Residents in Ngongotahā's Western Road were told to temporarily evacuate due to rising water levels in the Ngongotahā Stream.
- 22 May
  - The government announces NZ$24 million in funding for the I Am Hope Foundation's Gumboot Friday programme, which provides counselling to young people.
  - Former Labour Party MP and cabinet minister Kiri Allan pleads guilty to charges of careless driving and failing to accompany a police officer in July 2023.
- 23 May – A sixteen year old Trinity Catholic College student Enere McLaren-Taana dies after being stabbed at Dunedin's bus hub in Great King Street.
- 24 May – A thirteen-year-old boy is charged with murder in relation to McLaren-Taana's death.
- 29 May – The first results for the 2023 New Zealand census are released, covering population, age and ethnicity.
- 30 May
  - Te Pāti Māori and the Toitu Te Tiriti movement hold a nationwide day of protest in opposition to the Government's perceived assault on Tangata whenua and the Treaty of Waitangi. Protest marches and car convoy rallies occur in several urban centres including Auckland, Tauranga, Christchurch and Invercargill.
  - Junior doctors affiliated with the Resident Doctors' Association (RDA) and New Zealand Blood Service employees affiliated with APEX and the Public Service Association stage twin strikes to demand better wages and working conditions.
  - The 2024 budget is delivered.
- 31 May
  - Jetstar Flight JQ225 slides off the runway at Christchurch Airport, after suffering steering issues caused by a possible hydraulic leak.
  - Tiwai Point Aluminium Smelter reaches an agreement with Meridian Energy on an electricity supply deal, allowing it to remain open until 2044.
  - Employment Court Chief Judge Christina Inglis dismisses television broadcaster TVNZ's appeal against the Employment Relations Authority's ruling orders TVNZ to enter into collective bargaining with its employees.
  - Hawke's Bay iwi (tribe) Ngāti Kahungunu hosts a second national hui of unity at Omāhu Marae near Hastings.
  - The Wellington City Council votes to sell its 34% minority stake (worth NZ$278 million) in Wellington Airport, investing the proceeds in a major disaster investment fund.

=== June ===
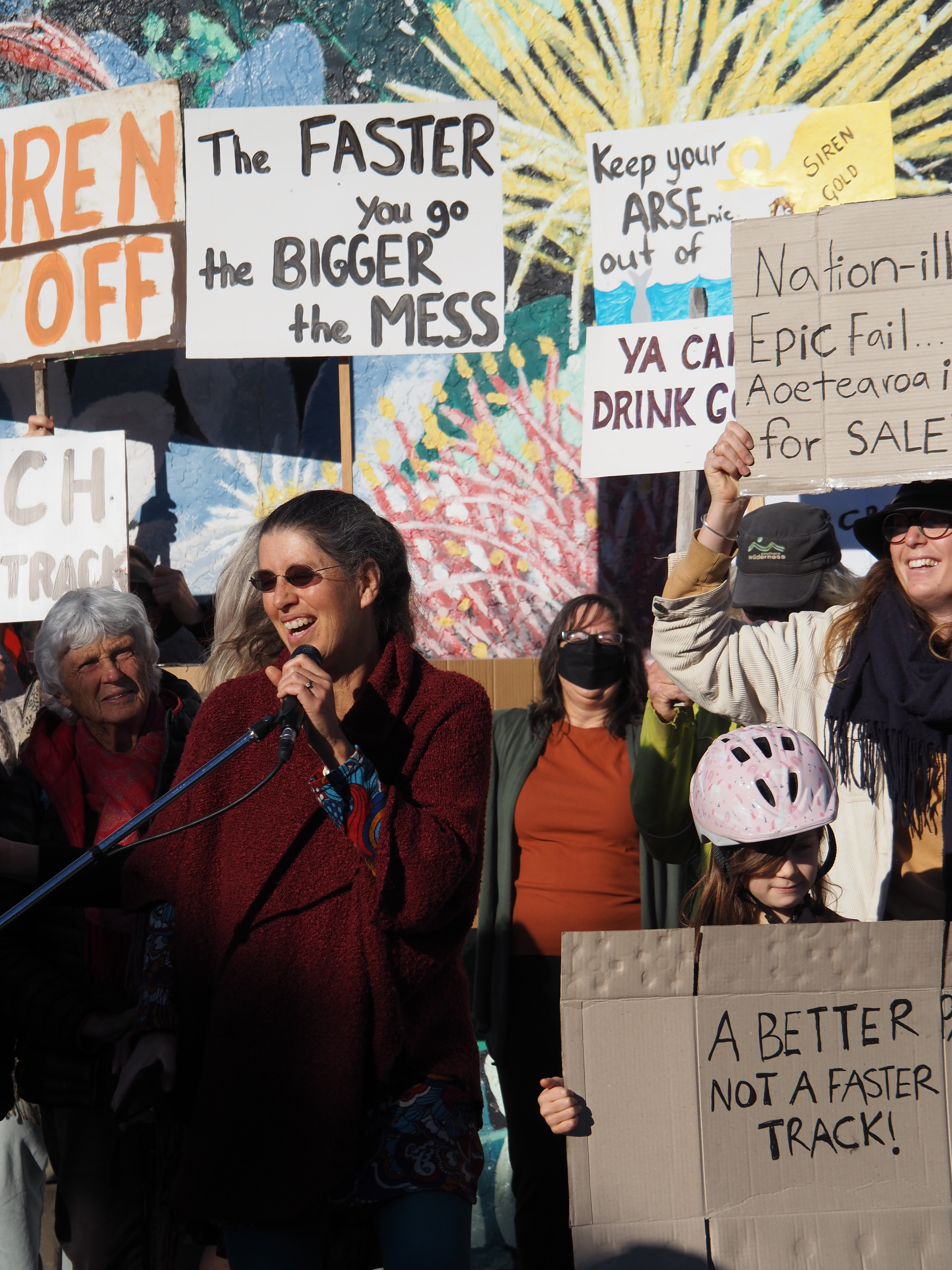
The March for Nature in Tākaka

- June – Eleven pseudoephedrine cold and flu medicines return to shelves without the requirement of a prescription after the Misuse of Drugs (Pseudoephedrine) Amendment Act 2024 was passed in April 2024. In 2011 they became prescription-only due to being a methamphetamine precursor ingredient.
- 1 June – Police in Levin arrest two individuals and impound six cars after a gathering with over 200 cars turns violent.
- 3 June – The 2024 King's Birthday Honours are announced.
- 5 June – Prime Minister Christopher Luxon and Niuean Premier Dalton Tagelagi announce an agreement to enhance the free association relationship between the two countries and that New Zealand would invest NZ$20.5 million into a new renewable energy project on Niue.
- 7 June – National Party MP David MacLeod is referred by the Electoral Commission to the Police over undeclared election donations totalling almost NZ$178,000.
- 8 June – 20,000 people take part in the "March for Nature" protest in Auckland against the Government's proposed Fast-track Approvals Bill.
- 8–10 June – Rail workers affiliated with the Rail and Maritime Transport Union strike for over weekend leave and workload issues.
- 10 June – The Public Service Commission launches an investigation into alleged privacy data breaches by Te Pāti Māori (Māori Party) during the 2023 New Zealand general election.
- 11 June – The Commerce Commission files 21 criminal charges against Kiwibank for errors resulting in over 36,000 customers being overcharged by a total of NZ$7 million.
- 13 June – Chinese Premier Li Qiang undertakes a state visit to reaffirm China–New Zealand relations.
- 16 June – Air New Zealand Flight NZ607 experiences turbulence during a flight between Wellington and Queenstown, causing injury to a crew member and passenger.
- 17 June
  - Green Party co-leader Marama Davidson announces her breast cancer diagnosis.
  - Virgin Airlines Boeing 737 VA148 makes an emergency landing in Invercargill after a bird strike.
- 20 June
  - A falling transmission tower causes a power outage that affects almost 100,000 properties in Northland, which is most of the region. The power outage was caused by Omexon contractors removing all the nuts securing the tower to its baseplate in breach of safety protocols.
  - New GDP figures are revealed, marking the country's exit out of a recession. GDP rose by 0.2% since the last quarter although GDP per capita dropped by 0.3%. This is the sixth consecutive quarter that GDP per capita has fallen.
- 21 June – Due to a steering problem, the Interislander ferry Aratere runs aground near Picton. There are no injuries.
- 22 June – Aratere is refloated.
- 24 June – The Department of Conservation delays plans to create six marine reserves in the southeast South Island, which had been announced by the previous Labour Government in October 2023.
- 25 June
  - Parliament receives a 60,000 strong petition opposing the National-led coalition government's plans to reverse the ban on live animal exports.
  - Torrential rain leads to flooding in Hastings and Wairoa, resulting in evacuations and local states of emergency.
  - Media company Stuff announces the closure of its last remaining Northland community newspapers: The Northern News, The Whangārei Leader and Far North Real Estate.
- 26 June
  - Frederick Hobson and Shane Tane are sentenced for their roles in the murder of Janak Patel.
  - Lauren Dickason is sentenced to 18 years imprisonment for murdering her three children.
  - Three fishermen are found dead following heavy rainfall and winds that caused coastal inundation along the Eastern coast.
- 27 June
  - Former Green Party MP Golriz Ghahraman is convicted of four charges of shoplifting and fined $1600 and court costs of $260.
  - Cadbury confirms that it had stopped production of chocolate fish in 2023 due to a lack of demand.
- 29 June – Postal voting for the 2024 Tauranga local elections opens.
- 30 June – Te Aka Whai Ora (the Māori Health Authority) is dissolved.

=== July ===
- 1 July
  - New Zealand Transport Agency Waka Kotahi reduces funding for the Te Huia passenger railway line between Auckland and Hamilton from 75% to 60%.
  - The Earthquake Commission is renamed the Toka Tū Ake Natural Hazards Commission.
  - Launch of the Sport Integrity Commission, the country's anti-doping agency and professional sports oversight body.
- 5 July – The last episode of Newshub is aired on television, ending 34 years of broadcasting.
- 6 July – Newshub's replacement news bulletin ThreeNews premieres on Three TV channel.
- 10 July – The Crown admits that a miscarriage of justice occurred in the convictions of Gail Maney and Stephen Stone for the murder of Deane Fuller-Sandys.
- 12 July – The New Zealand Government extends the New Zealand Defence Force's deployment to assist US-led efforts to combat Houthi forces in the Red Sea until 31 January 2025.
- 15 July – A pay dispute between the New Zealand Government and New Zealand Police Association is settled in the Government's favour following third-party arbitration.
- 16 July – Kiwibank pleads guilty to "systemic breaches" of the Fair Trading Act 1986.
- 18 July
  - Two buses travelling as part of a convoy carrying Chinese tourists overturn within 100 metre of each other along State Highway 8 between Lake Tekapo and Twizel, injuring 15 people.
  - After admitting to breaching the Gambling Act, SkyCity Auckland casino announces that it will close for five consecutive days.
- 19 July – Global IT outages affect several businesses in the country, including ANZ, ASB, Kiwibank, Westpac, Woolworths, Auckland Transport's HOP card and Jetstar.
- 20 July – Mahé Drysdale is elected as Mayor of Tauranga. Local body elections are also held, ending four years of rule by commissioners.
- 22 July – Skipper Lance Goodhew is acquitted of breaching his duties as a worker aboard the fishing boat Enchanter, which capsized at North Cape in March 2022, resulting in four deaths.
- 23 July
  - Four former Gloriavale Christian Community members file a NZ$10 million class action lawsuit against Gloriavale and five government agencies, alleging that members had been subject to modern slavery from childbirth.
  - A wildfire near Lake Pukaki burns 50 hectares of land, leading to the evacuation of four properties.
- 24 July – A formal inquiry by the New Zealand government concludes that since 1950, about 200,000 people in state and religious care were abused, experiencing abuses such as rape, sterilization, and electric shocks.
- 28 July – Stuff publishes the last issue of the Sunday News newspaper, ending a 61-year printing run.
- 29 – The Government's new boot camp pilot for youth offenders opens in Palmerston North.
- 30 July:
  - The remains of real estate agent Yanfei Bao are discovered after she went missing a year prior.
  - Parliament passes legislation reinstating the referendum requirement for Māori wards and constituencies in local councils.

=== August ===
- 1 August – A three-year boil water notice is issued for the Eastern Bush/Otahu Flat area in the Southland Region.
- 2 August – Leaders of the Ngāpuhi, Ngāti Manuhiri and Te Roroa iwi (tribes) boycott an Iwi Chairs Forum meeting with several government ministers to protest the Government's alleged anti-Māori government policies.
- 3 August – Three people die after their boat capsizes on the Riverton bar.
- 5 August – New Zealand Warriors player and 2023 Dally M Awards winner Shaun Johnson announces his retirement from rugby league at the end of the 2024 season.
- 7 August:
  - The Kaipara District Council votes to disestablish its Māori ward.
  - Lead contamination is reported in Tokomaru's water supply, with residents being told to use bottled water.
- 12 August:
  - Severe weather hits the country from Gisborne to Canterbury. MetService issues a severe thunderstorm warning for the lower North Island.
  - Five schools in Nelson and Nelson Hospital go into lockdown as a precaution against a family harm incident.
- 14 August:
  - The Reserve Bank drops the official cash rate by 25 basis points to 5.25 per cent, the first drop since March 2020.
  - Methamphetamine-laced lollies are accidentally distributed by anti-poverty charity Auckland City Mission, prompting a Police investigation in the Auckland Region.
- 15 August – Justice Minister Paul Goldsmith issues an extradition order against fugitive Internet entrepreneur Kim Dotcom, allowing him to be moved to the United States.
- 20 August – Unionised Hato Hone St John ambulance workers and call centre staff stage their first strike in response to a pay dispute.
- 21 August – Three South Korean nationals are killed in a collision between a van and a four-wheel-drive vehicle near Geraldine, Canterbury Region.
- 22 August: – Whakaari / White Island erupts, prompting flight cancellations.
- 24 August – Unionised Hatone Hone St John ambulance workers and call centre staff hold a second nationwide strike in response to a pay dispute.
- 26 August:
  - The Commerce Commission imposes a fine of NZ$420,000 on the dairy firm Milkio Foods Limited for mislabeling its ghee products as produced locally in New Zealand despite importing butter from India.
  - The Court of Appeal of New Zealand upholds the Employment Court's 2022 ruling that Uber drivers should be treated as employees rather than contractors.
- 27 August:
  - The Commerce Commission imposes a fine of nearly NZ$2.5 million on TSB Bank for overcharging customers.
  - High Court Justice Peter Andrew orders the Head Hunters gang and its alleged boss Wayne Doyle to forfeit NZ$15 million worth in cash and property assets to the New Zealand Police.
  - Australian Police and New Zealand Police announce they have concluded a joint illicit drug operation that resulted in 1,611 arrests and 2,962 charges nationwide. The police also confiscated almost 1,400 kilograms (3,100 lb) of illicit drugs and over 2,500 cannabis plants, worth 93 million AUD (US$63 million).
  - Three Samoan seasonal workers are killed in a multi-vehicle crash in Ramarama, Auckland.
  - The Auckland Council cancels e-scooter company Beam after the company deployed more e-scooters than its licence allowed.
- 28 August:
  - A roll out of an encrypted emergency services radio system begins in South Canterbury, which prevents eavesdropping by the public. It is expected to be operating nationwide by 2026.
  - Parliament passes legislation requiring local councils to develop plans for delivering drinking water, wastewater and stormwater services as part of its "Local Water Done Well" programme.
- 30 August – Tūheitia Paki, the Māori King, dies unexpectedly at the age of 69 after heart surgery.
- 31 August – The Manahau tank barge runs aground near Westport.

=== September ===
- 2 September – The Government unveils its National Land Transport Programme, which aims to build 17 "Roads of National Significance" over the next three years and complete several public transportation projects including Auckland's City Rail Link.
- 5 September – Nga wai hono i te po succeeds her father Tūheitia to become the Māori queen.
- 7 September – Several local councils voice opposition to the National-led government's plans to reverse "blanket" speed limit reductions introduced by the previous Labour Government.
- 9 September:
  - Two Auckland Muslim schools Al-Madinah School and Zayed College go into lockdown after receiving an email threat.
  - SkyCity Auckland closes for five days for failing to stop a problem gambler from spending over NZ$1 million in pokies.
  - KiwiRail pays a fine of NZ$432,500 for exposing passengers to risk after the Kaitaki lost power while travelling across the Cook Strait in late January 2023.
  - An Mpox case linked to the Winter Pride festival in Queenstown in late August 2024 is reported.
- 10 September:
  - Thousands of union-affiliated Woolworths supermarket workers strike to demand better wages and working conditions.
  - Winstone Pulp International closes down its Karioi pulp mill and Tangiwai timber mill, affecting 230 jobs in the Ruapehu District.
- 11 September:
  - An independent government-commissioned review criticises the Hawke's Bay Regional Council's lack of preparation and community engagement prior to the flooding in Wairoa in June 2024.
  - A second mpox case linked to the Queenstown Winter Pride festival is reported.
- 12 September:
  - Parliament passes a private member's bill amending the Fair Trading Act 1986 to ensure that gift cards have a minimum expiry date of three years from their initial purchase.
  - Kaikōura Dark Sky Sanctuary is accredited by DarkSky International as New Zealand's third international dark sky sanctuary.
- 13 September – Heavy snowfall in Central Otago and the Canterbury High Country leads to road and school closures, and power outages affecting thousands of residents.
- 16 September:
  - The hoiho is named Bird of the Year for 2024.
  - The Alcohol Regulatory and Licensing Authority bans 32 New World supermarkets in the South Island from selling alcohol for 48 hours after the chain offered an illegal 26% discount on alcohol beverages on 9 January 2024.
- 17 September:
  - Police charge the 41 members of the New Zealand chapter of the Comanchero Motorcycle Club with a total of 137 charges and seize NZ$9.2 million worth in assets following a complex three-year investigation.
  - Te Papa National Museum introduces a new NZ$35 entry fee for international visitors.
- 18 September:
  - Oji Fibre Solutions announces that it will close its Penrose pulp and paper recycling mill effective 18 December, leading to 72 job losses.
  - Ravensdown announces that it will close its Dunedin fertiliser plant effective January 2024, leading to 30 job losses.
- 19 September
  - The Wairoa Star is revived after selling to a new owner. The 103-year-old newspaper had previously closed in May.
  - Parliament passes two new laws banning the public display of gang insignia, imposing non-consorting orders on gang members and making gang membership an aggravating factor in sentencing.
  - Over 200 New Zealand Defence Force civilian employees opt for voluntary redundancy as part of a restructuring plan.
  - StraitNZ ferry MV Connemara loses power at 10:30pm while crossing the Cook Strait, prompting an investigation by Maritime New Zealand.
- 20 September:
  - The Supreme Court of New Zealand orders the New Zealand Crown to fund four Te Kāhui litigants NZ$105,000 in court costs prior to their customary marine title case that is scheduled to be held in November 2024.
  - Former Green Party Member of Parliament Darleen Tana loses her bid for a judicial review of her party's decision to expel her.
  - A total of 11 mpox cases, including several Clade II, cases are linked to the Queenstown Winter Pride outbreak.
- 21 September – New Zealand pilot Philip Mehrtens is released by West Papuan rebels after one and a half years in captivity following negotiations involving Indonesian authorities and New Zealand government agencies.
- 23 September – Auckland retired eye surgeon Philip Polkinghorne is acquitted of his wife Pauline Hanna's death following an eight-week murder trial.
- 24 September:
  - Bayfield High School in Dunedin and Wellington East Girls' College are evacuated after receiving email threats.
  - Police Commissioner Andrew Coster is appointed as the next chief executive of the Social Investment Agency, effective 11 November.
  - High Court Justice Robert Osborne rules against a Queenstown Lakes District Council bylaw restricting freedom camping in Queenstown and Wānaka.
- 25 September
  - The New Zealand Parliament passes legislation reviving charter schools.
  - Dunedin City Council votes to retain ownership of Aurora Energy.
  - Social housing provider Kāinga Ora announces a second round of job cuts, affecting 321 jobs.
  - GNS Science confirms that 59 roles will be cut, amounting to 10% of its workforce.
  - The Engineering New Zealand Disciplinary Committee upholds a complaint against senior engineer Alan Reay for inadequately supervising the construction of the CTV Building, which collapsed during the 2011 Christchurch earthquake.
- 26 September
  - Associate Education Minister David Seymour announces plans to prosecute parents for school truancy and to remove teacher-only days during school term time.
  - The Government confirms that the Dunedin Hospital rebuild would be scaled back significantly, citing its projected NZ$3 billion cost and upgrading projects at other regional hospitals.
  - Education Minister Erica Stanford reallocates NZ$30 million from the "Te Ahu o te Reo Māori" teacher training programme to refreshing the mathematics curriculum.
  - 100 protesters gather outside the Israeli Embassy in Wellington to protest the recent escalation in the Israel-Hezbollah conflict in Lebanon.
  - Science, Innovation and Technology Minister Judith Collins confirms plans to give the National Institute of Water and Atmospheric Research (NIWA) oversight over fellow weather forecaster and MetService following a review of the national weather forecasting system.
  - New Zealand signs a free trade agreement with the United Arab Emirates that would remove duties on 99% of New Zealand exports over the next three years.
- 27 September
  - Public broadcaster Whakaata Māori (Māori Television) proposes job cuts as part of an internal restructuring due to budgetary constraints and a digital transition.
  - The Alliance Group proposes shutting down its Timaru Alliance Smithfield meatworks plant, which would affect about 600 jobs.
  - The Hastings District Council votes by a split majority to grant non-elected youth councillors voting rights during committee meetings.
- 28 September:
  - Thousands gather in Dunedin, Westport and Reefton to protest health sector cuts including the Government's plans to scale back the reconstruction of the Dunedin Hospital.
  - Launch of the Buller Declaration petition campaign for better health services nationwide.
- 30 September:
  - A power outage caused by a helicopter cutting transmission lines affects 3,500 households in the Lake Tekapo and Aubury area.

=== October ===
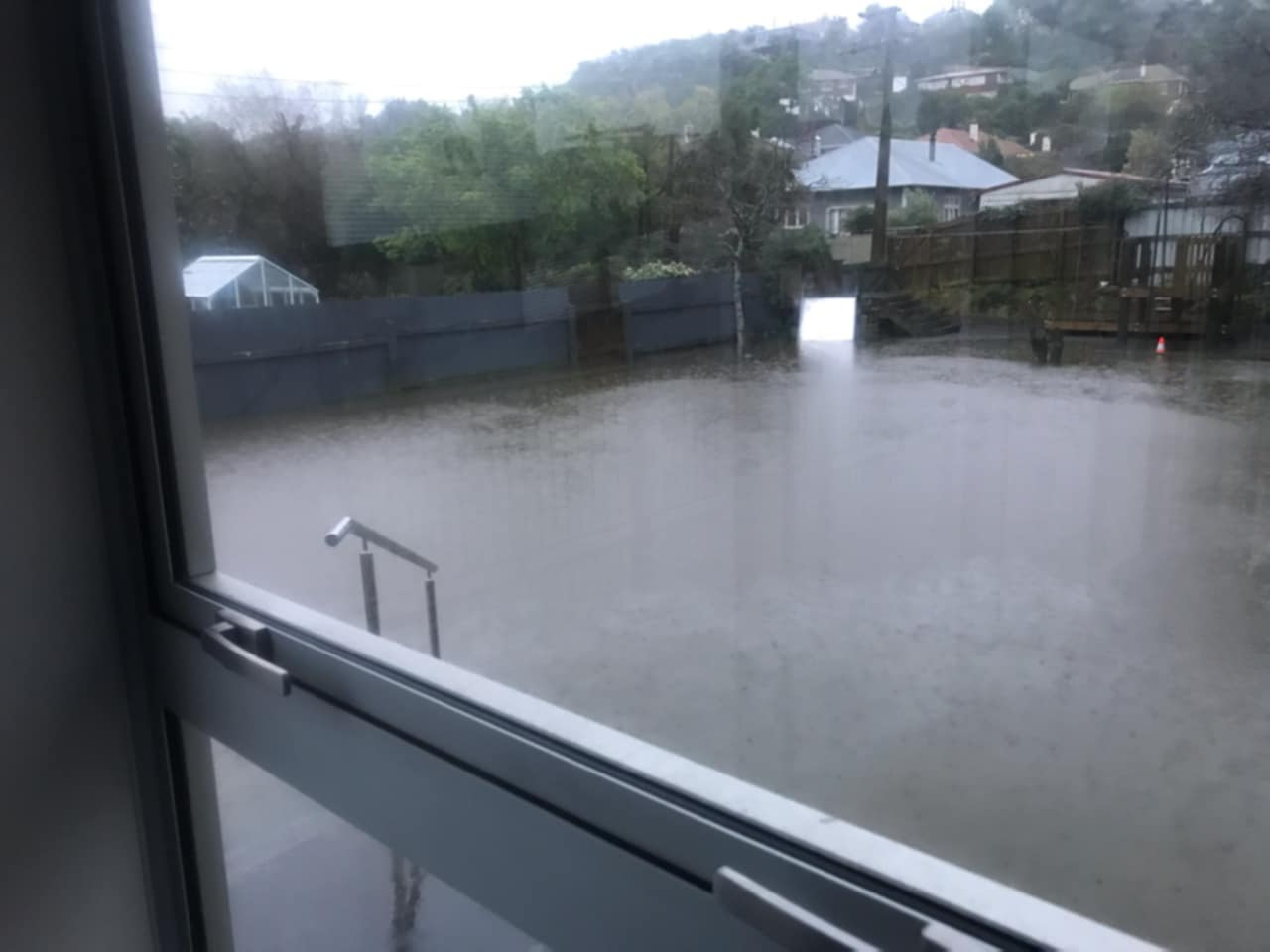
Flooding at Musselburgh Baptist Church in Dunedin

- 1 October:
  - Fines for illegally parking in disabled cark parks rise from NZ$150 to NZ$750.
  - The International Visitor Conservation and Tourism Levy (IVL) rise from NZ$35 to NZ$100.
  - COVID-19 rapid antigen tests cease to be free.
  - The Commerce Commission blocks the proposed merger of Foodstuffs' North Island and South Island divisions.
  - Regulations requiring vaping devices to have removable batteries and child safety devices come into force.
- 2 October:
  - The Court of Appeal of New Zealand quashes Gail Maney's conviction for the murder of Deane Wade Fuller-Sandys.
  - Philip Morris withdraws its IQOS heated tobacco products from the New Zealand market due to new vaping regulations.
- 3 October:
  - Statistics New Zealand releases its second tranche of data related to the 2023 New Zealand census.
  - MetService issues a red heavy rain warning for North Otago, Dunedin and the coastal Clutha District.
  - A state of emergency is declared in Dunedin in response to heavy rainfall and flooding. Residents in low-lying suburbs are told to evacuate.
- 4 October: A state of emergency is declared in the Clutha District due to heavy rainfall and flooding.
- 5 October – The Government approves a NZ$226 million roads and highways resilience package to reduce the impact of severe weather events.
- 6 October:
  - A magnitude 5.7 earthquake occurs 25 kilometres west of Wellington. A 16-storey apartment complex in Wellington is evacuated and temporarily cordoned off.
  - HMNZS Manawanui catches fire and sinks off Samoa, after running aground on 5 October. All 75 people aboard are rescued. The sinking marks the first loss of a Royal New Zealand Navy vessel in service since World War II.
  - Dunedin and the Clutha District lift their states of emergency as flooding subsides.
- 7 October:
  - Public broadcaster TVNZ proposes a second round of restructuring including closing the 1News website in February 2025 and investing more in its TVNZ+ streaming service.
  - Pro-Israel and pro-Palestinian protesters staged competing protesters outside TVNZ to mark the first anniversary of the outbreak of the Gaza war.
- 8 October – The Government allocates NZ$6 million to improve wait times and patient care and services at Palmerston North Hospital.
- 9 October:
  - The official cash rate is cut by 50 basis points to 4.75 per cent.
  - 200 pro-Palestinian protesters call on the University of Otago to condemn the "Gaza Genocide" and end collaborations with Israeli universities and corporations.
- 10 October
  - The Wellington City Council votes not to sell their 34% share in Wellington International Airport.
  - KiwiRail proposes slashing 50 operational and head office roles in the state-owned Interislander ferry service.
- 11 October – The MV Connemara loses power a second time while approaching Wellington Harbour.
- 13 October – Pro-Palestinian protesters disrupt the New Zealand First's party's annual conference in Hamilton.
- 14 October:
  - Minister of Conservation Tama Potaka announces 19 new marine protection areas in the Hauraki Gulf.
  - Mayor of Tauranga Mahé Drysdale and the Tauranga City Council adopt a resolution to fluoridate Tauranga's water supply, effective 24 October.
- 16 October – Parliament unanimously passes Deborah Russell's private member's bill exempting victims of domestic violence from waiting a mandatory two years to seek a divorce upon the granting of a protection order from their spouse.
- 17 October – The Green Party of Aotearoa New Zealand's membership votes to initiate waka-jumping legislation against former Green MP Darleen Tana.
- 18 October:
  - The Alliance Group confirms that it will close its Smithfield meat processing plant in Timaru, affecting about 600 jobs.
  - New Zealand initiates mandatory negotiations with Canada under the multilateral CPTPP trade framework in response to a bilateral dispute over Canadian dairy tariffs.
- 19 October – Air New Zealand Flight NZ247 is grounded at Sydney Airport following a bomb threat.
- 20 October – A wildfire near Meremere in Waikato burns over 2,471 acres of the protected Whangamarino Wetland, prompting an emergency response from firefighters.
- 22 October:
  - Former Green Party MP Darleen Tana is expelled from the New Zealand Parliament using the Electoral (Integrity) Amendment Act 2018.
  - Associate Education Minister David Seymour releases the Government's revised school meal programme.
  - The Government decides to appoint a Crown observer to Wellington City Council in response to the council's budgetary problems.
  - The Government amends resource management legislation to prevent local government bodies from implementing new freshwater plans before the Government can update its national policy statement for freshwater management (NPSFM).
  - The New Zealand Police arrest 28 people and seize NZ$800,000 worth in assets during a North Island-wide operation targeting the Mongrel Mob Barbarians MC gang's East Bay chapter in Ōpōtiki. In response, Te Pati Māori co-leader accused Police of terrorising Māori communities in Opotiki during Operation Highwater. Police Minister Mark Mitchell has defended the conduct of Police during the operation.
  - Thousands, including Māori queen Nga wai hono i te po, attend a third national hui for unity at Tuahiwi Marae in North Canterbury focusing on indigenous economies.
- 23 October:
  - Thousands attend nationwide protests in 12 centres organised by the New Zealand Council of Trade Unions to protest the New Zealand Government's cuts to public services and alleged attack on the Treaty of Waitangi.
  - The Christchurch City Council passes a resolution to amend its procurement policy to exclude companies involved in building and maintaining Israeli settlements in the Occupied Palestinian territories.
  - A woman is stabbed to death while travelling on a bus in Onehunga, the first violent fatality aboard an Auckland Transport public transport service since 2010.
- 24 October:
  - High winds disrupt 28 flights and the berthing of a StraitNZ ferry in Wellington.
  - The New Zealand Government appoints retired cabinet minister Richard Prebble and senior insurer Ken Williamson to the Waitangi Tribunal. Kevin Prime is reappointed for a second term.
- 25 October:
  - High winds lead to the cancellation of 30 flights in Wellington and power outages in Ohariu. Heavy rain, snow and wind warnings are issued throughout the North and South Islands.
  - Kael Leona is charged with murder of Bernice Louise Marychurch in relation to the Onehunga bus stabbing incident on 23 October.
- 26 October – Heavy rain, strong winds and snow lead to flooding, road closures and adverse weather warnings in the Nelson-Marlborough, West Coast Regions and Central Otago.
- 27 October – Firefighters contain the Whangamarino Wetland wildfire, which has destroyed more than 1,000 ha of wetland.
- 30 October:
  - American streaming platform Max launches on Sky New Zealand's channels and platforms including its Neon streaming service.
  - The Education Review Office releases truancy figures confirming that over 80,000 students were absent from school for more than three weeks during Term 2 of the 2024 school year.
  - Tamah Alley succeeds Tim Cadogan as Mayor of Central Otago.
  - The New Zealand Government reimburses 95 Lake Alice Hospital survivors, who had part of their compensation payments deducted by legal fees in 2001.
- 31 October — New Zealand signs a free trade agreement with the six-member Gulf Cooperation Council (GCC). As part of the agreement, 99% of New Zealand exports to the GCC would become duty-free over a ten-year period.

=== November ===
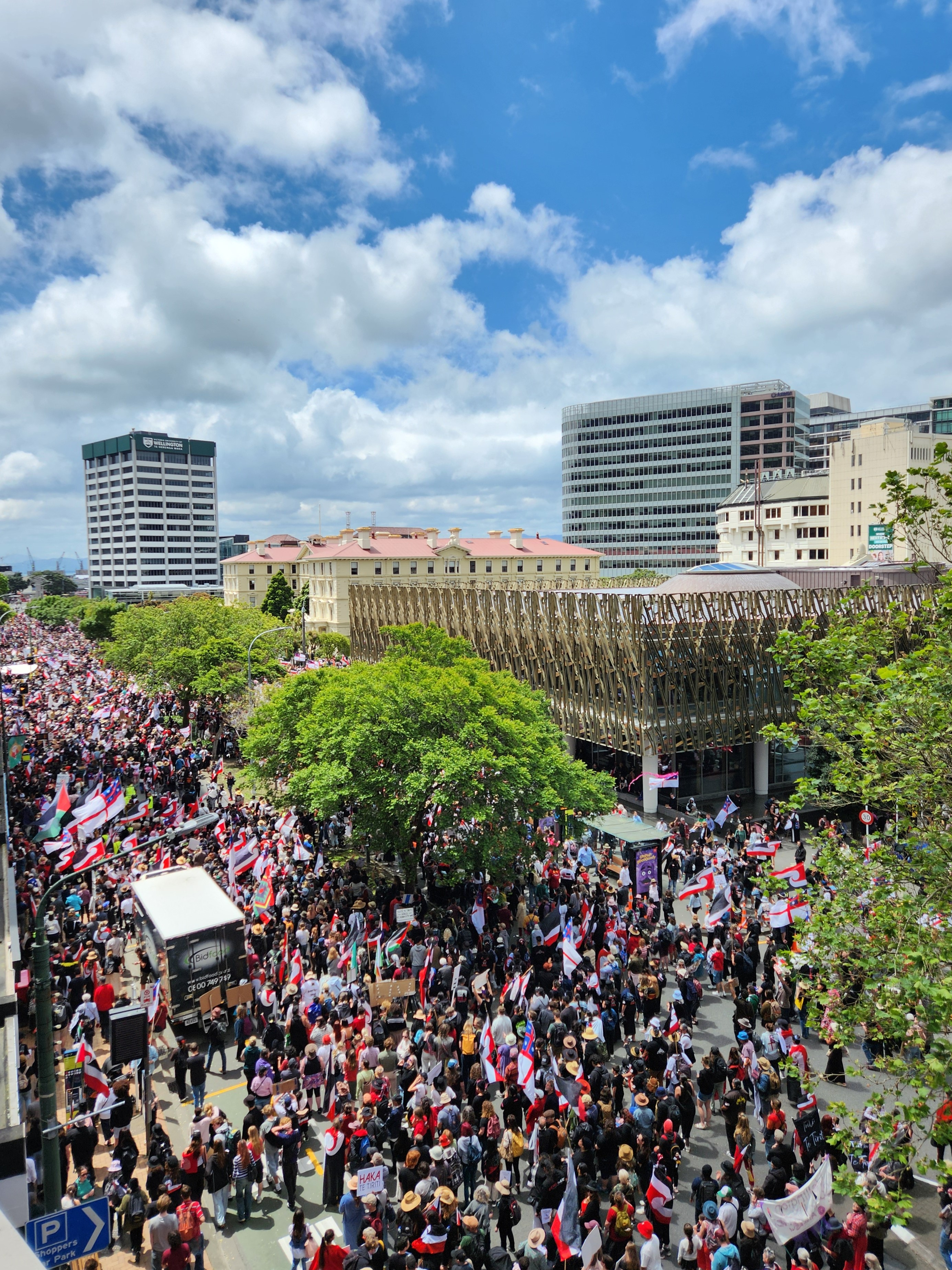
Hīkoi mō te Tiriti on Lambton Quay, Wellington

- 2 November — The Queenstown-based news website Crux ceases publication due to business difficulties.
- 4 November:
  - New Zealand Police ceases to respond to mental health call outs.
  - Two University of Canterbury residential halls report a food poisoning outbreak affecting over 100 students.
- 5 November:
  - The Inland Revenue Department ceases sharing taxpayers' encrypted details with social media platforms following criticism from 8,000 taxpayers.
  - The Imam Raza Mosque in Auckland's New Lynn suburb is the target of an attempted arson attempt, prompting a response from Police and firefighters.
- 6 November:
  - Police arrest a 19-year-old man in relation to the Imam Reza Mosque arson attempt in New Lynn yesterday.
  - The Government signs a NZ$25.2 million compensation settlement with three Kurahaupō iwi tribes to resolve a post-Treaty of Waitangi settlement issue of contaminated land at RNZAF Base Woodbourne.
- 7 November – The Treaty Principles Bill is introduced to the New Zealand Parliament ahead of schedule, sparking protests in Wellington and Auckland's Epsom suburb.
- 8 November – Heavy rain leads to flooding and road closures in the southern Westland District.
- 9 November – Mayor of Westland Helen Lash declares a state of emergency in southern Westland after the region experiences 375 mm of rain in the last 24 hours. Homes in and around Haast are also flooded. New Zealand State Highway 6 was also temporarily closed by a land slide.
- 10 November:
  - The local state of emergency in southern Westland is lifted. State Highway 6 between Haast and Franz Josef Glacier remains closed due to slips.
  - Justice Minister Paul Goldsmith announces the Government will introduce new anti-stalking legislation with new restraining and harmful digital communications orders.
- 11 November:
  - The Hīkoi mō te Tiriti (March for the Treaty) opposing the Treaty Principles Bill begins marching to Wellington in two convoys from Cape Reinga in Northland and Bluff in Southland.
  - Dairy company Fonterra confirms the sale of several consumer brands including Anchor and Mainland, its subsidiaries Fonterra Oceania and Fonterra Sri Lanka, and 17 manufacturing sites in New Zealand and overseas.
  - Sistema Plastics confirms plans to lay off 100 workers at its Auckland factory by Christmas 2024.
  - The Government appoints Lindsay McKenzie as the Crown Observer to the Wellington City Council.
- 12 November:
  - Prime Minister Christopher Luxon delivers the Government's apology to survivors of abuse in state and faith-based care.
  - The elephant Burma is moved from Auckland Zoo to Monarto Safari Park in South Australia, leaving New Zealand without any elephants.
- 13 November – Thousands of Hīkoi mō te Tiriti participants cross the Auckland Harbour Bridge on their way to Wellington.
- 14 November:
  - NZME proposes shutting down 14 of its community newspapers due to declining advertising.
  - The Treaty Principles Bill passes its first reading in the New Zealand Parliament amidst heated debate and opposition. Te Pāti Māori MP Hana-Rawhiti Maipi-Clarke is suspended for 24 hours by the Speaker after leading a haka (Ka Mate) involving members of the public that caused parliamentary proceedings to be delayed for half an hour.
- 15 November – The Government sets aside 9,000 hectares off the coast of Southland for offshore aquaculture.
- 16 November – Destiny Church leader Brian Tamaki leads a "Make New Zealand Great Again" motor rally in Auckland.
- 17 November – Thousands attend a referendum on Khalistan independence organised by Sikhs for Justice in Auckland's Aotea Square.
- 18 November – About 1,000 people gather in the Dunedin Town Hall to oppose the Government's proposed cuts to Dunedin Hospital.
- 19 November – 42,000 people attend the ninth and final day of the Hīkoi mō te Tiriti protest march outside the New Zealand Parliament, drawing international media attention.
- 20 November:
  - Oji Fibre Solutions proposes halting paper processing at its Kinleith Mill in Tokoroa by 2025, affecting 230 jobs.
  - Richard Chambers is confirmed by Police Minister Mark Mitchell as the next Police Commissioner, effective 25 November.
  - The New Zealand Government designates both Hezbollah and the Houthis as terrorist entities.
  - The New Zealand Parliament passes legislation restoring the right to New Zealand citizenship for people born in Samoa between 1924 and 1949.
- 21 November:
  - The Gangs Act 2024's provisions including a ban on gang patches comes into force.
  - Health New Zealand declares a whooping cough epidemic after an outbreak of 263 cases over the past month.
- 24 November – Volunteers led by whale rescue organisation Project Jonah manage to refloat 40 stranded whales near Ruakākā. Four whales died.
- 27 November – A bus carrying foreign tourists collides with two other vehicles outside Hamilton, killing one person and injuring 13 others.
- 28 November – The report into the first phase of the Royal Commission of Inquiry into COVID-19 Lessons Learned is released to the public.
- 29 November:
  - A man is convicted of discharging effluent into the Low Burn Stream near Mataura in mid-February 2024, which killed thousands of shortfin eels.
  - The first report from the naval inquiry into the sinking of HMNZS Manawanui attributes the sinking to human error.
  - The Waitangi Tribunal found that the New Zealand Crown had breached the Treaty of Waitangi by disestablishing Te Aka Whai Ora (the Māori Health Authority).
  - The Whangārei District Council votes to reject a directive by the Ministry of Health to flouridate their water supply.

=== December ===
- 2 December:
  - The Hillgrove Egg Farm in Moeraki, which is run by Mainland Poultry, reports the country's first case of the H7N6 subtype of avian influenza, leading to the culling of 40,000 chickens. Biosecurity Minister Andrew Hoggard orders a halt to all New Zealand poultry exports until the country is free of the H7N6 subtype.
  - The Supreme Court of New Zealand rules in favour of the Attorney-General's appeal against a 2023 decision by the Court of Appeal which lowered the threshold for proving Māori customary foreshore and seabed customary claims.
- 3 December:
  - A second shed at the Hillgrove Egg Farm is infected with the H7N6 subtype of avian influenza, leading to the culling of about 80,000 chickens.
  - 36,000 nurses, midwives and healthcare assistants stage an eight-hour strike to protest adverse pay and working conditions at hospitals nationwide.
  - Transport Minister Simeon Brown and Mayor of Auckland Wayne Brown announce an overhaul of Auckland municipal transport agency Auckland Transport's functions and mandate.
  - Thirteen beached pilot whales die in Golden Bay despite local efforts to refloat them.
  - Three American and Canadian hikers are reported missing on Aoraki / Mount Cook.
- 4 December:
  - Ten Auckland high schools receive email threats, prompting a Police investigation.
  - Minister of Science, Innovation and Technology Judith Collins announces that the New Zealand Government will end Marsden grants for humanities and social science research in favour of STEM research.
- 5 December:
  - A wildfire breaks out near Bridge Hill in the Canterbury Region, engulfing 535 hectares of scrubland and leading to the closure of State Highway 73 between Springfield and Arthur's Pass.
  - Two Dunedin high schools including Bayfield High School and ten early childhood centres in Auckland receive email threats.
- 6 December – The 2024 New Zealand bravery awards are announced.
- 7 December – A third shed at the Hillgrove Egg Farm tests positive for the H7N6 bird flu virus. Biosecurity New Zealand also confirms plans to cull another 40,000 chickens at a fourth shed, bringing the total number of culled birds to 160,000.
- 8 December – Firefighters work on containing the Bridge Hill fire, which has engulfed nearly 1,000 hectares of land northwest of Springfield, Canterbury.
- 9 December:
  - 40,000 rearing hens at the Hillgrove Egg Farm are culled in order to contain the H7N6 bird flu, bringing the total number of culled birds to 200,000.
  - Minister for Workplace Relations Brooke Van Velden announces that the Government will enact policies to allow employers to deduct pay for striking employees.
  - The Court of Appeal of New Zealand allows the Bank of New Zealand to proceed with action to close Gloriavale Christian Community's accounts, citing breaches of the bank's human rights policy.
- 10 December:
  - The Commerce Commission announces that it will file criminal charges against Woolworths and two Pak'nSave supermarkets, alleging inaccurate pricing and misleading specials.
  - Winston Peters announces that the New Zealand Government will ban greyhound racing by July 2026.
- 11 December:
  - Winston Peters is appointed Minister for Rail.
  - The National Iwi Chairs Forum issues an open letter to King Charles III requesting that he intervene to address the New Zealand Crown's alleged breaches of Treaty of Waitangi obligations towards Māori.
- 12 December - Parliament passes legislation introducing pet bonds for tenants and reinstating 90 day no-cause evictions.
- 13 December:
  - The New Zealand Parliament passes legislation reinstating the three strikes law that was repealed by the Sixth Labour Government.
  - The Government abandons plans to progress the Fair Digital News Bargaining Bill, which proposed a tax on social media companies for using New Zealand media content.
- 16 December – Supermarket chain Woolworths signs a new collective bargaining agreement with First Union, giving union-affiliated workers a 6.8 percent pay rise over a period of two years.
- 17 December:
  - The New Zealand Government's Fast-track Approvals Bill passes its third reading.
  - 3,000 Ministry of Business, Innovation and Employment (MBIE) workers commence a partial strike in opposition to a zero percent pay offer from the Government.
- 18 December:
  - The Government offers survivors of abuse and torture at Lake Alice Hospital lump sum payments of NZ$150,000 each.
  - Fire and Emergency New Zealand imposes a total fire ban in Wairarapa due to dry conditions.
- 19 December:
  - The Nelson-Tasman Region introduces a new regional cat control plan requiring all new cats to be microchipped, de-sexed and registered on the New Zealand Companion Animal Register.
  - Fire and Emergency New Zealand bans fireworks, sky lanterns and open fires in the Hawke's Bay and Queenstown Lakes District in response to dry conditions.
  - The New Zealand economy enters into a state of recession, with its third quarterly GDP dropping by 1%.
- 21 December – A lightning strike disrupts power for 50,000 Transpower customers in Hawke's Bay, Gisborne and Wairoa.
- 23 December:
  - A total fire ban comes into force in the Canterbury Region due to recent wildfires and dry conditions.
  - The Interislander ferry Kaiārahi experiences a technical fault while sailing from Wellington to Picton. The ferry resumes sailing after repairs are made to its lubrication pump.
- 26 December – Auckland's passenger rail network shuts down for up to 96 days between Christmas 2024 and late January 2026 for upgrades ahead of the City Rail Link project's completion.
- 31 December:
  - Parent support and education provider Parents Centres New Zealand ceases operations.
  - The 2025 New Year Honours are announced.
  - 100 union-affiliated Immigration New Zealand border staff commence strike action until 20 January 2025 to demand a pay rise from the Government.
  - Kapiti Island and Mana Island are returned to Ngāti Toa Rangatira after a Treaty of Waitangi settlement with the Crown in 2014.

== Holidays and observances ==
Public holidays in New Zealand in 2024 are as follows:

- 1 January – New Year's Day
- 2 January – Day after New Year's Day
- 6 February – Waitangi Day
- 29 March – Good Friday
- 1 April – Easter Monday
- 25 April – Anzac Day
- 3 June – King's Birthday
- 28 June – Matariki
- 28 October – Labour Day
- 25 December – Christmas Day
- 26 December – Boxing Day

== Weather ==
Highest annual sunshine hours

1. 2769 hours – Blenheim
2. 2760 hours – Richmond
3. 2734 hours – Tauranga

Highest annual rainfall

1. 11,503 millimetres (452.9 in) – Cropp River

Lowest annual rainfall

1. 354 millimetres (13.9 in) – Alexandra and Bromley
3. 374 millimetres (14.7 in) – Riccarton

Highest recorded temperature

1. 37.0 °C (98.6 °F) – Hanmer Forest, 5 February

Lowest recorded temperatures

1. −11.8 °C (10.8 °F) – Lake Tekapo, 3 August
2. −11.1 °C (12.0 °F) – Mount Cook Aerodrome, 3 and 4 August

Highest recorded wind gust

1. 198 km/h (123 mph) – Cape Turnagain, 20 September

== Sport ==
=== Cricket ===
January

- New Zealand defeats Pakistan 4–1 in a five-match Twenty20 International series in New Zealand.
- The 2024 Women's T20I Pacific Cup is played in Auckland, with New Zealand Māori losing to Papua New Guinea in the final.
- The 2023–24 Women's Super Smash is won by the Wellington Blaze, their eighth title.
- The 2023–24 Men's Super Smash is won by the Auckland Aces, their fifth title.

February

- New Zealand beats South Africa 2–0 in a two-Test series in New Zealand, becoming the inaugural winners of the Tangiwai Shield and winning a Test series against South Africa for the first time.
- Australia defeats New Zealand 3–0 in a three-match T20I series in New Zealand.

March

- Australia defeats New Zealand 2–0 in a two-match Test series in New Zealand.
- The England women's cricket team defeats New Zealand 4–1 in a five-match T20I series in New Zealand.

April

- The England women's cricket team defeats New Zealand 2–1 in a three-match ODI series in New Zealand.
- New Zealand and Pakistan draw 2–2 in a five-match Twenty20 International series in Pakistan.

=== Horse racing ===
==== Harness racing ====
- Auckland Cup
  - Better Eclipse (May)
  - Republican Party (December) (Note: The Auckland Cup was run twice in 2024, in May and December, as the race was moved back to its traditional December running after three years of being held in May.)
- New Zealand Cup – Swayzee
- Rowe Cup – Just Believe

==== Thoroughbred racing ====
- Auckland Cup – Mahrajaan
- New Zealand Cup – Mehzebeen
- Wellington Cup – Mary Louise

=== Motorsport ===
- 19 February – Shane van Gisbergen makes his first NASCAR Xfinity Series full-time start at Daytona International Speedway.
- 1 June – Shane van Gisbergen wins his first Xfinity race at the Pacific Office Automation 147.

=== Olympics ===
New Zealand sends a team of 195 competitors across 22 sports to the 2024 Summer Olympics, held in Paris from 26 July to 11 August.

Gold	Silver	Bronze	Total
10	7	3	20

=== Paralympics ===
New Zealand sends a team of 24 competitors across eight sports to the 2024 Summer Paralympics, held in Paris from 28 August to 8 September.

Gold	Silver	Bronze	Total
1	4	4	9

=== Rowing ===
- New Zealand Secondary School Championships (Maadi Cup)
  - Maadi Cup (boys' U18 coxed eight) – St Bede's College
  - Levin Jubilee Cup (girls' U18 coxed eight) – Christchurch Girls' High School
  - Star Trophy (overall points) – Hamilton Boys' High School

=== Shooting ===
- Ballinger Belt – Mike Collings (Te Puke)

=== Tennis ===
The ASB Classic tournament is held in Auckland from 1 to 13 January:

- Women's singles – Coco Gauff
- Women's doubles – Anna Danilina / Viktória Hrunčáková
- Men's singles – Alejandro Tabilo
- Men's doubles – Wesley Koolhof / Nikola Mektić

=== Winter Youth Olympics ===
New Zealand sends a team of 22 competitors across seven sports to the 2024 Winter Youth Olympics, held in Gangwon, South Korea, from 19 January to 1 February.

Gold	Silver	Bronze	Total
1	2	4	7

== Deaths ==
=== January ===
- 1 January
  - Sandra Blewett, marathon swimmer (born 1949).
  - Ngamoni Huata, poi expert, kapa haka performer, tutor and judge, Te Tohu Whakamanawa o Te Matatini (2023) (born 1946).
- 2 January – Richard Izard, Hall of Fame industrialist and philanthropist (born 1934).
- 3 January – Martin Thrupp, education academic (University of Waikato) (born 1964).
- 4 January – Y. P. Reddy, Fijian businessman, co-founder of the Reddy Group (born 1934).
- 5 January – Mike Cross, rugby union player (Manawatu) and administrator, president of the New Zealand Rugby Football Union (1997–1998) (born 1936).
- 6 January
  - Tony Adeane, lawyer and judge, District Court judge (1993–2020) (born c. 1951).
  - Richard Wallace, Māori Anglican bishop, Pīhopa o Te Waipounamu (since 2017) (born 1945).
- 8 January
  - Michael Brown, Anglican clergyman, dean of Wellington Cathedral of St Paul (1985–2002) (born 1936).
  - Duncan Hales, rugby union player (Canterbury, Manawatu, national team) (born 1947).
- 9 January
  - Bill Harris, political scientist (University of Otago) (born 1952).
  - Magnus Murray, Catholic priest, schoolteacher, convicted child sex offender (born 1927).
- 10 January – Anaru Rangiheuea, Māori leader (Te Arawa) (born 1935).
- 11 January – Hugh Willis, volunteer bush-track builder (born 1934).
- 18 January – Louise Petherbridge, theatre actor, director and producer (born 1931).
- 19 January – Ann Pacey, jazz singer, actress (Send a Gorilla, Dangerous Orphans, Oscar and Friends), and television personality (Beauty and the Beast) (born 1941).
- 22 January
  - Brien Bennett, snooker and billiards player and administrator, chair of the International Billiards and Snooker Federation (1980–1990) (born 1937).
  - Jimmy Choux, Thoroughbred racehorse, New Zealand 2000 Guineas (2010), New Zealand Derby (2011), Rosehill Guineas (2011), New Zealand Horse of the Year (2010–11) (foaled 2007).
- 23 January – Bryan Nicholson, lawyer and judge, District Court judge (1967–1987), Chief Justice of Samoa (1976–1980) (born 1929).
- 24 January – Selwyn Muru, artist (Waharoa), broadcaster (Radio New Zealand, TVNZ), actor (Runaway), writer and educator, Te Tohu mō Te Arikinui Dame Te Atairangikaahu (1990) (born 1937).
- 26 January – Peg Moorhouse, weaver (born 1917).
- 29 January – Ronnie Joyner, basketball player (Washington State Cougars, Wellington Saints, Northland Suns), NBL All-Star (1985, 1986) (born 1959).
- 30 January
  - Feau Halatau, drummer (The Radars) (born 1945).
  - Mary-Annette Hay, promoter of wool (New Zealand Wool Board), and watercolour artist (born 1925).
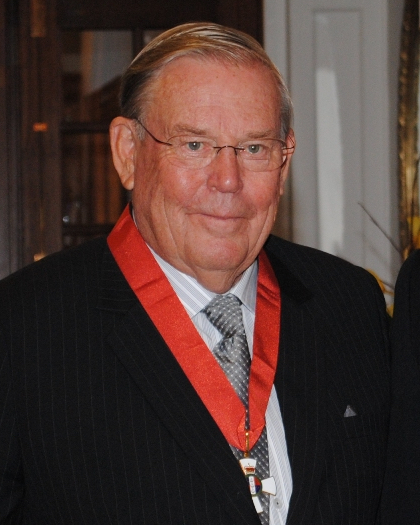
Richard Izard

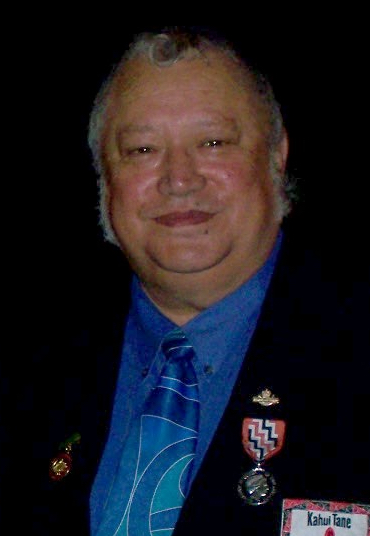
Richard Wallace

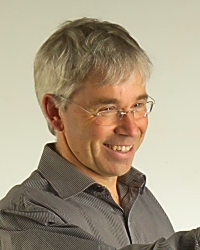
Bill Harris

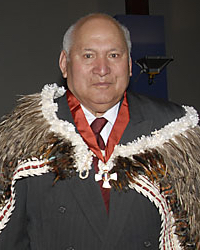
Anaru Rangiheuea

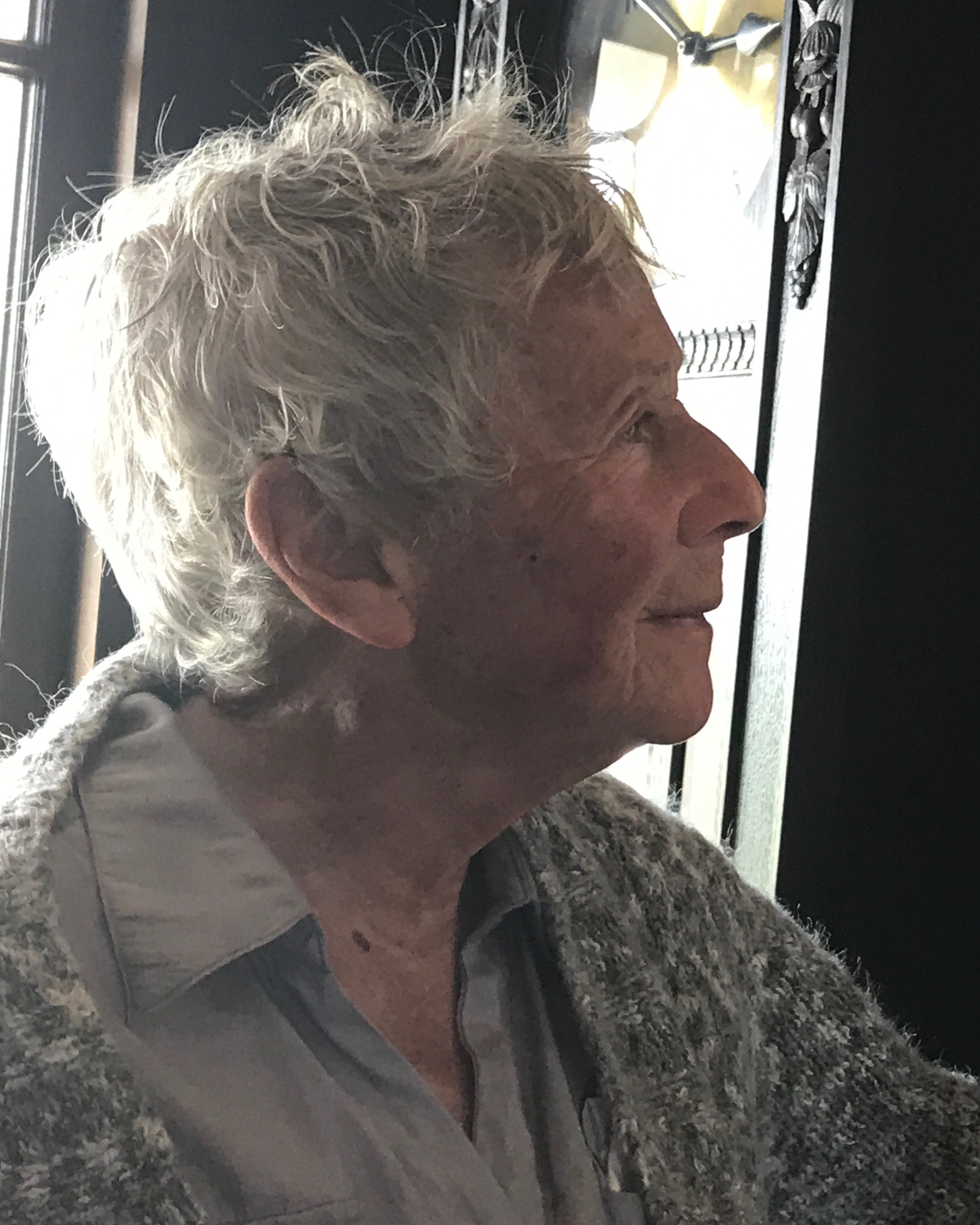
Louise Petherbridge

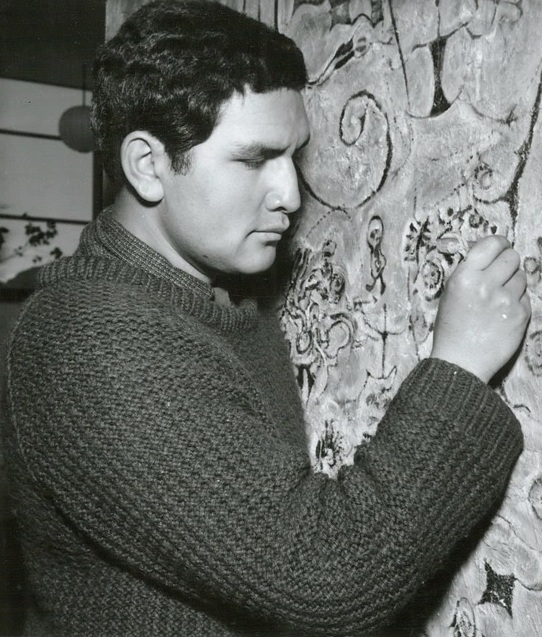
Selwyn Muru

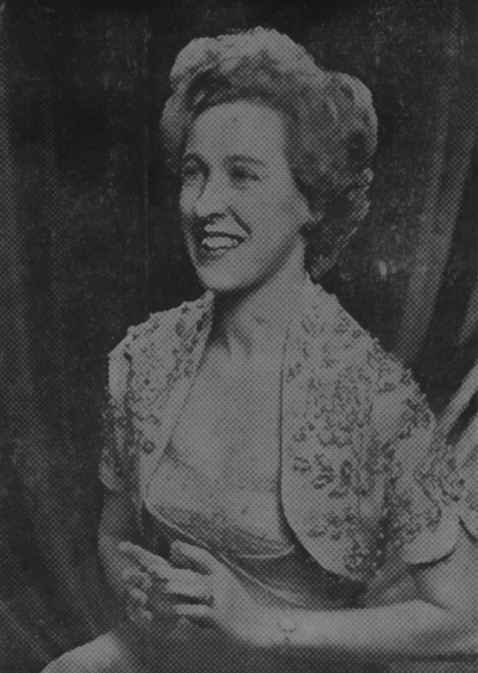
Mary-Annette Hay

=== February ===
- 2 February – Honor McKellar, operatic mezzo-soprano (New Zealand Opera Company, Glyndebourne Chorus, John Alldis Choir), singing teacher (Jonathan Lemalu, Patrick Power) and lecturer (University of Otago) (born 1920).
- 3 February – Ray Watters, geographer (Victoria University of Wellington), co-developer of the MIRAB model (born 1928).
- 4 February – Desmond Kelly, actor (Smash Palace, The Scarecrow, Dark Knight) (born 1928).
- 6 February – Don McKay, rugby union player (Auckland, national team) (born 1937).
- 9 February
  - Pat Benson, rugby union player (Hawke's Bay, Junior All Blacks), marathon swimmer, restorer of art deco buildings (born 1957).
  - John Donoghue, musician (Bulldogs Allstar Goodtime Band, The Human Instinct, The Warratahs) (born c. 1948).
  - Paul Schultz, rugby league player (Auckland, national team) (born 1940).
- 10 February – Gerald Hensley, public servant and diplomat, High Commissioner to Singapore (1976–1980), Head of the Prime Minister's Department (1980–1987), Secretary of Defence (1991–1999) (born 1935).
- 13 February – Kerry Carman, botanical artist, gardening writer and columnist (New Zealand Listener) (born 1939).
- 14 February – Muru Walters, rugby union player (North Auckland, New Zealand Māori), carver, educator (Dunedin Teachers' College, St John's Theological College) writer, broadcaster (Radio New Zealand), and Anglican clergyman, Pīhopa o Te Upoko o Te Ika (1992–2018), Tom French Cup (1957) (born 1935).
- 15 February – Ellen Ellis, feminist, archivist and researcher (born 1944).
- 18 February
  - Garry Tee, mathematician and computer scientist (University of Auckland) (born 1932).
  - Verry Elleegant, Thoroughbred racehorse, Caulfield Cup (2020), Melbourne Cup (2021), Australian Champion Racehorse of the Year (2020–2021) (foaled 2015).
- 19 February – Graeme Everton, entrepreneur, Māori spectrum claimant (WAI 776, WAI 2224) (born 1963).
- 21 February – Efeso Collins, politician, Auckland Councillor (2016–2022), Green list MP (since 2023) (born 1974).
- 24 February
  - Bill Alington, architect (Wellington High School, Alington House) (born 1929).
  - Lesley Shand, conservationist (born 1942).
- 26 February – Charlie Crofts, Māori leader (Ngāi Tahu) (born 1943).
- 29 February
  - Craig Cary, microbial ecologist (University of Waikato) (born 1954).
  - Ross Garrett, physicist (University of Auckland), yachtsman, writer and conservationist (born 1928).
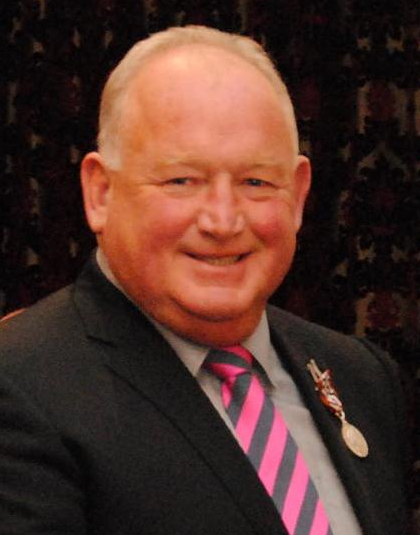
Pat Benson

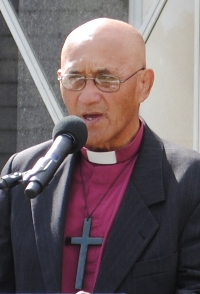
Muru Walters

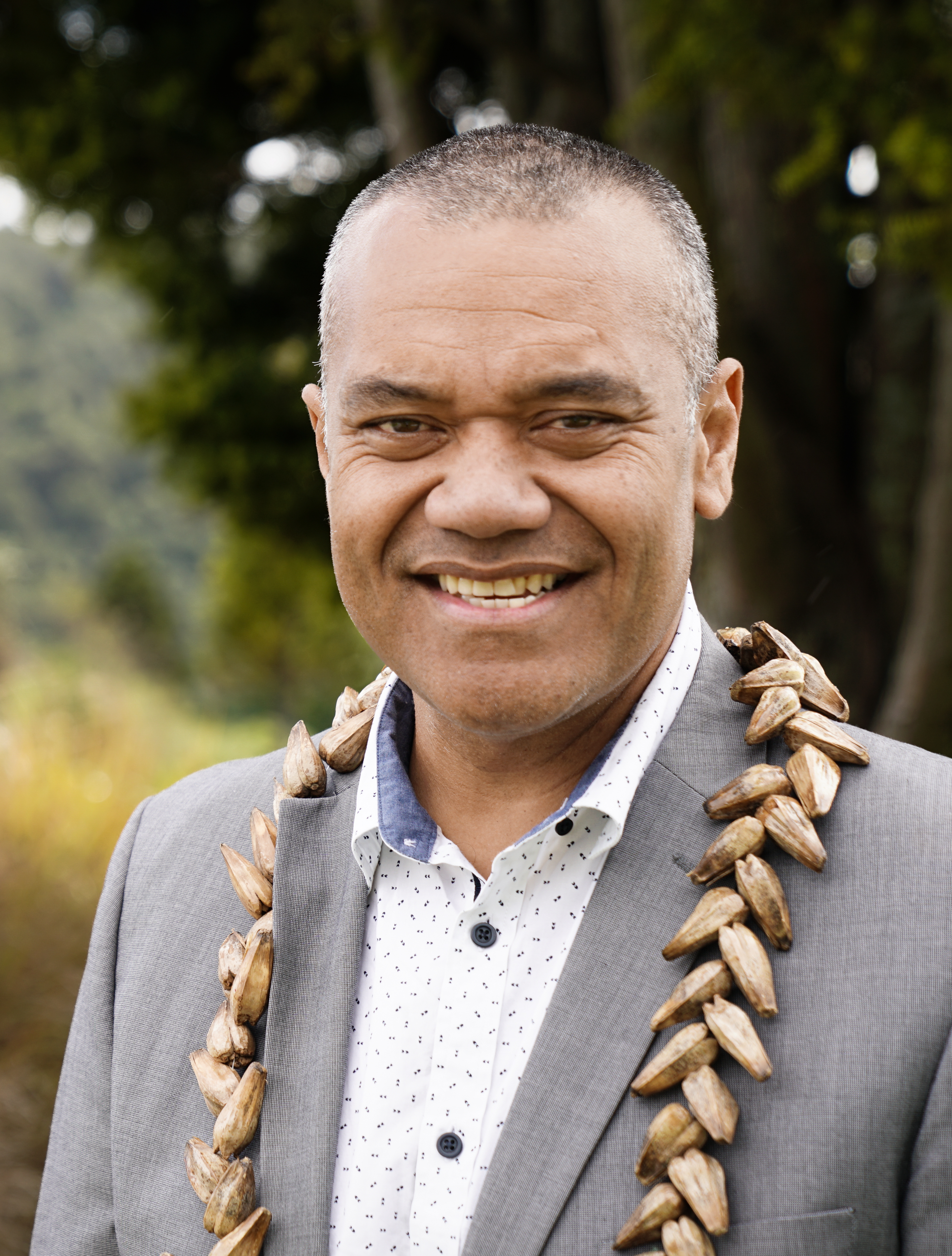
Efeso Collins

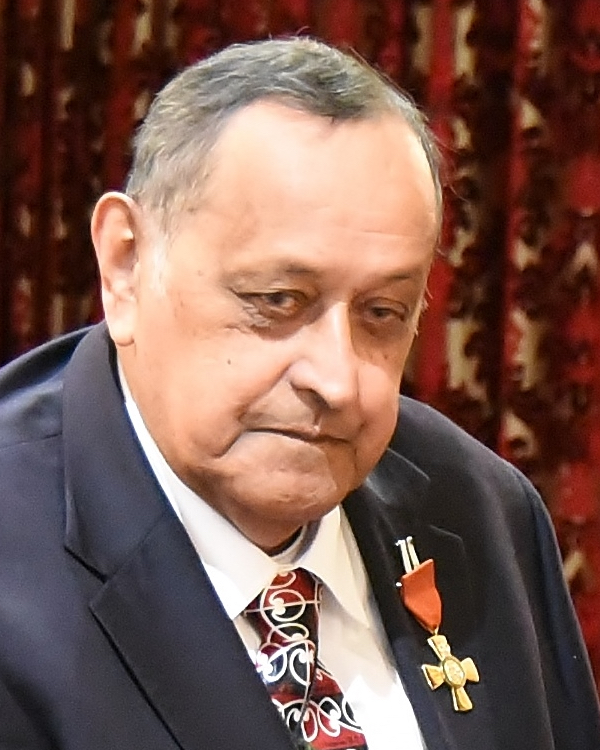
Charlie Crofts

=== March ===
- 1 March – Jim Davis, legal academic (University of Canterbury, Australian National University) (born 1936).
- 4 March – Bob Kirk, geomorphologist (University of Canterbury) and local politician, Canterbury Regional Councillor (2004–2010) (born 1944).
- 5 March
  - John Behrent, cricketer (Wellington, Auckland) (born 1938).
  - Jim Ng, general practitioner and Chinese community historian (born 1936).
- 8 March
  - David Gapes, journalist (The Evening Post, NZ Truth), commercial radio pioneer, band manager (Hello Sailor), and magazine editor, co-founder of Radio Hauraki (1966) (born 1942).
  - Jonathan Hunt, politician and diplomat, MP for New Lynn (1966–1996), Labour list MP (1996–2005), Postmaster-General (1984–1987), Speaker of the House of Representatives (1999–2005), High Commissioner to the United Kingdom (2005–2008), Privy Counsellor (since 1989), Member of the Order of New Zealand (since 2004) (born 1938).
  - Paul Lothian, decathlete, athletics coach (Hamish Kerr, Nneka Okpala, Kate Horan), national decathlon champion (1971) (born 1943).
  - Raymond Procter, cricketer (Otago) (born 1938).
- 10 March – John Bond, rugby league player (Canterbury, national team) (born 1931).
- 11 March
  - Brian Fineran, botanist (University of Canterbury) (born 1937).
  - Robin Fraser, pathologist (University of Otago, Christchurch) (born 1933).
- 16 March
  - Michal McKay, fashion and lifestyle editor (Vogue New Zealand, New Zealand Woman's Weekly, Cuisine).
  - Allan Pye, agribusiness entrepreneur (born 1941).
- 18 March – Jocelyn Munro, lawyer and judge, District court judge (2007–2020) (born 1950).
- 19 March
  - Caryll Clausen, local-body politician, Mayor of Manawatu (1989–1995) (born 1931).
  - Rod Oram, journalist and commentator (born 1950).
  - Neil Thimbleby, rugby union player (Hawke's Bay, national team) (born 1939).
- 20 March – Bernadette Farnan, lawyer and judge, District Court judge (since 2015) (born 1956).
- 21 March – Philip Recordon, lawyer and judge, District Court judge (2004–2018) (born 1948).
- 23 March
  - Harry Percival, soil scientist (Soil Bureau, Landcare Research) (born 1943).
  - Edmund Bohan, historian and singer (born 1935)
- 26 March – Clare Elliott, singer (Suburban Reptiles).
- 28 March – John Taylor, educator, headmaster of Rathkeale College (1979–1987) and King's College (1988–2002) (born 1941).
- 30 March – Diana Fenwick, arts sector leader, chair of the New Zealand Symphony Orchestra (2006–2009).
- 31 March – Jonathan Bennett, philosopher of language and metaphysics (University of Cambridge, University of British Columbia, Syracuse University) (born 1930).
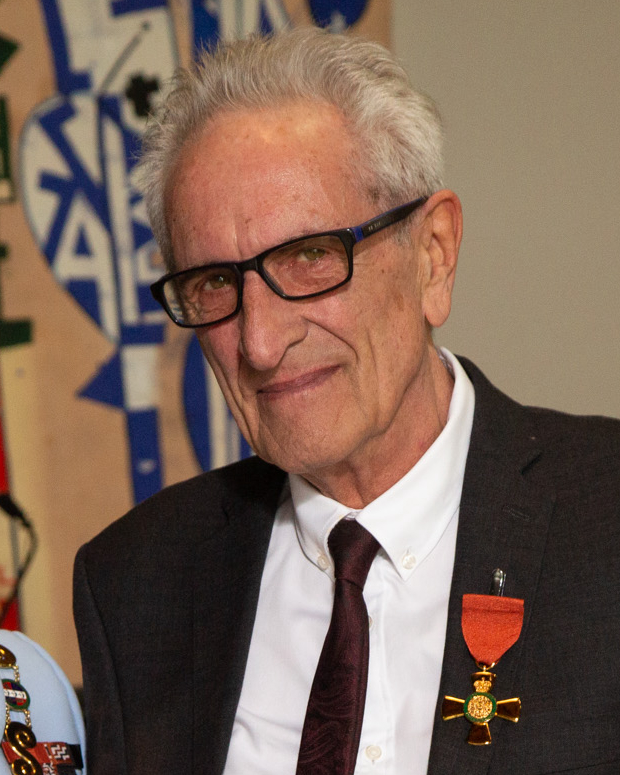
David Gapes

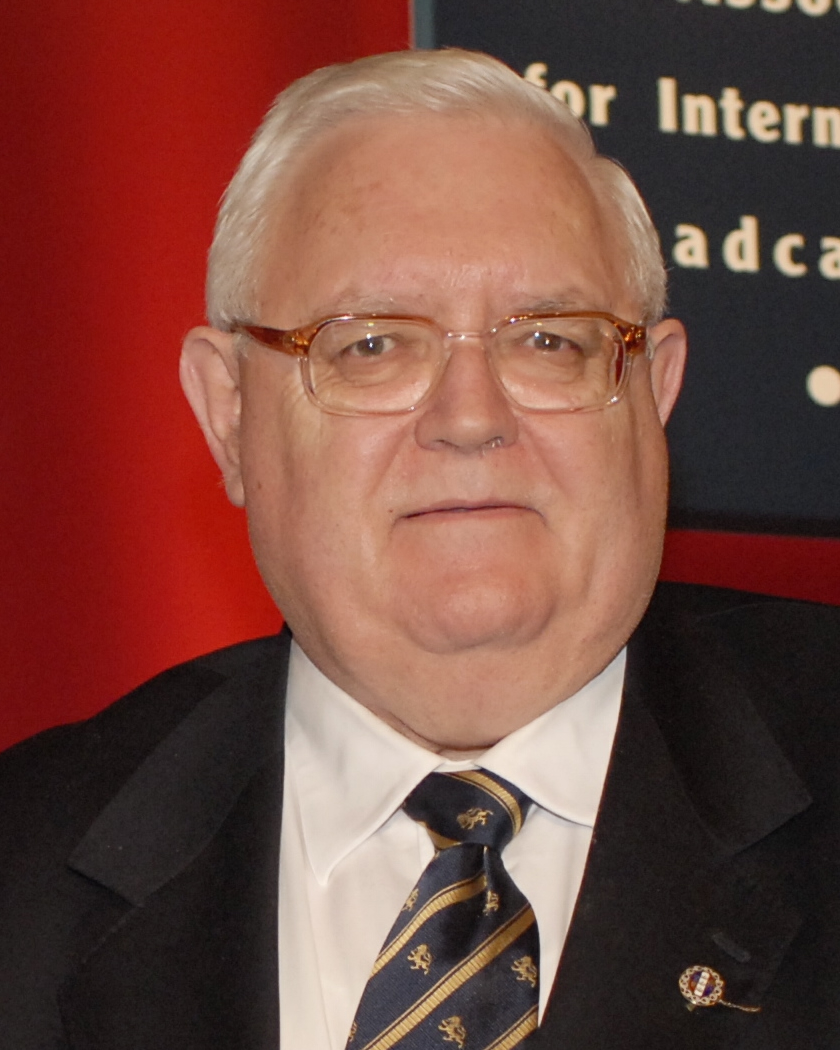
Jonathan Hunt

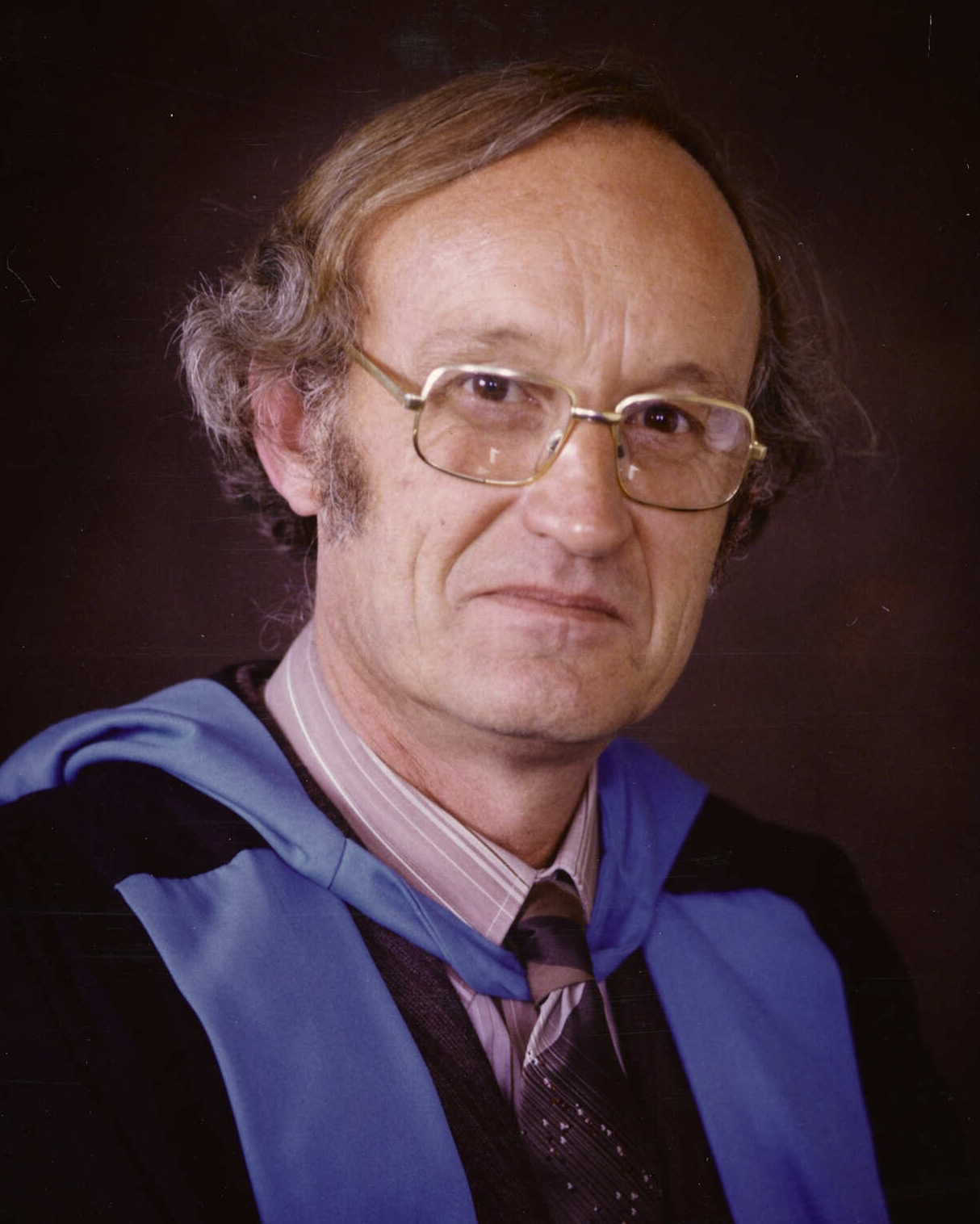
Robin Fraser

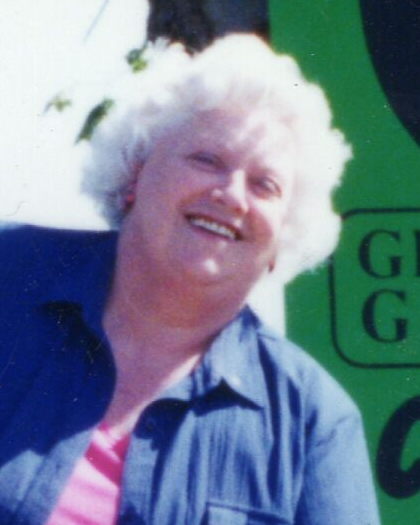
Caryll Clausen

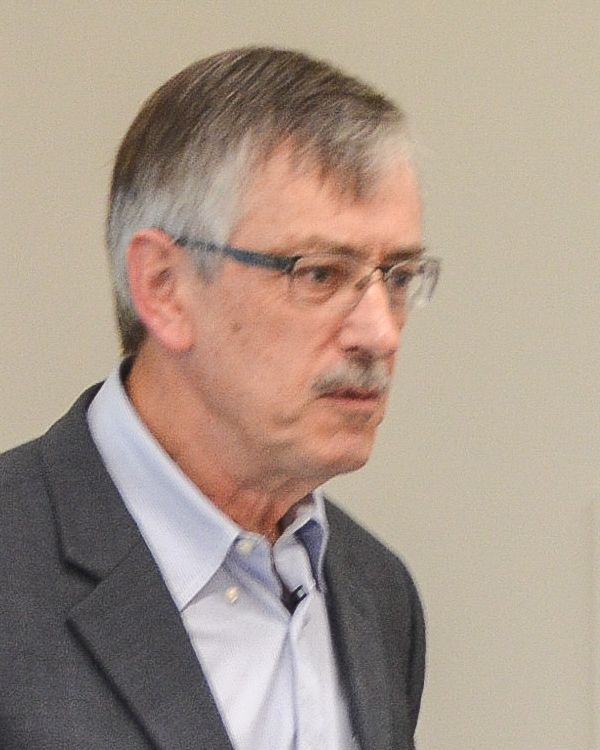
Rod Oram

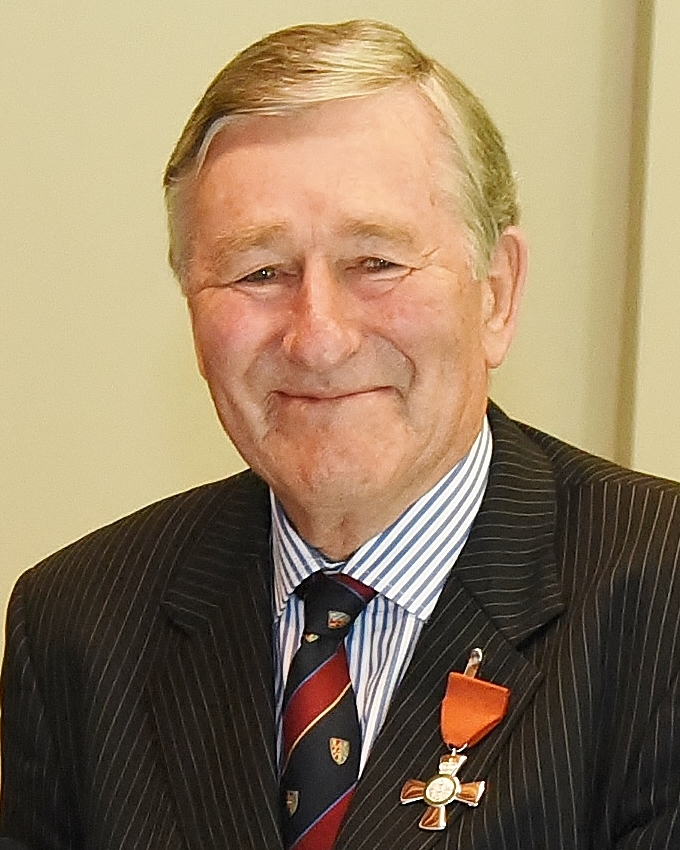
John Taylor

=== April ===
- 8 April – Ray Ralph, molecular biologist (University of Auckland), Fellow of the Royal Society of New Zealand (since 1993) (born 1932).
- 9 April
  - Jack Alabaster, cricketer (Otago, national team) and schoolteacher, principal of Kingswell High School (1975–1981) and Southland Boys' High School (1981–1988) (born 1930).
  - Denis Fairfax, naval officer (Royal New Zealand Navy), historian and writer, contributor to the Dictionary of New Zealand Biography, chief executive officer of Wellington Free Ambulance (1987–1990).
- 14 April – Alan Poletti, physicist (University of Auckland), Fellow of the Royal Society of New Zealand (since 1979) (born 1937).
- 17 April – Sir Colin Giltrap, Hall of Fame businessman and philanthropist (born 1940).
- 19 April – Ben Schrader, historian, W. H. Oliver Prize (2016), CLNZ Writers' Award (2017) (born 1964).
- 21 April – Chris Allum, bungy-jumping pioneer, set world record for highest bungy jump (1992) (born 1948).
- 26 April – Dave O'Sullivan, Hall of Fame Thoroughbred racehorse trainer (Horlicks, Mr Tiz, Waverley Star) (born 1933).
- 28 April – Sir Vincent O'Sullivan, writer and literary academic (Victoria University of Wellington, University of Waikato), Poet Laureate (2013–2015) (born 1937).
- 30 April
  - Sir Robert Martin, disability rights activist, member of the Committee on the Rights of Persons with Disabilities (since 2017) (born 1957).
  - Ngapare Hopa, Māori academic, born 1935.
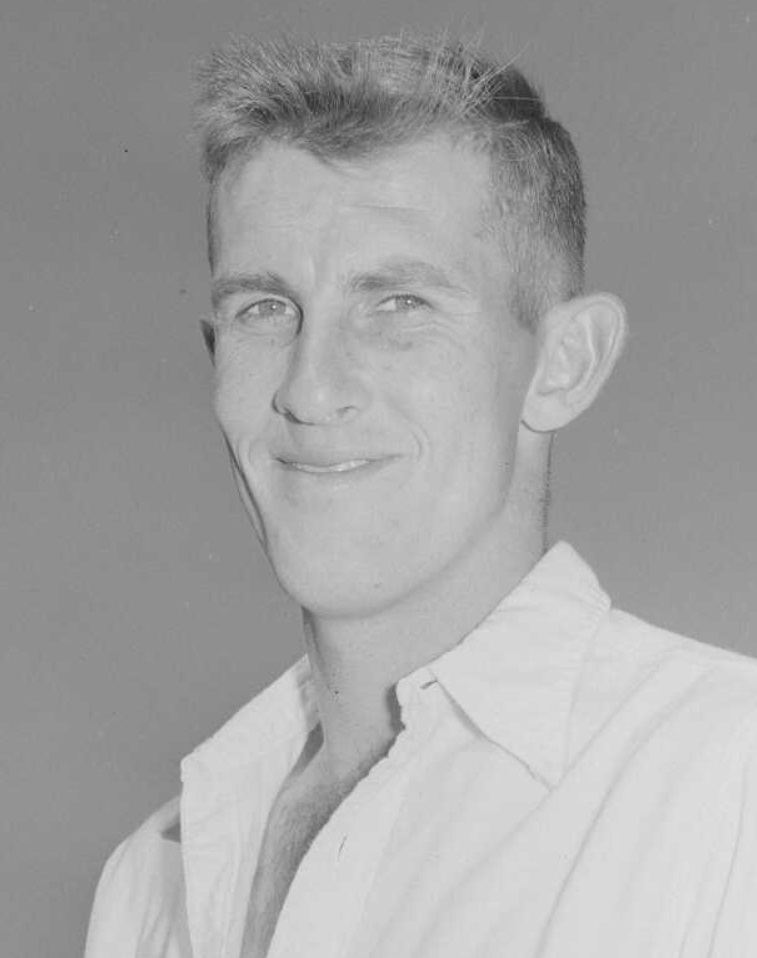
Jack Alabaster

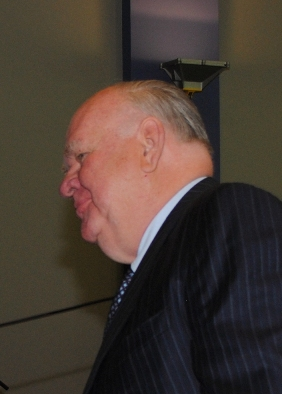
Sir Colin Giltrap

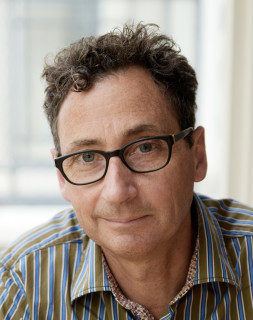
Ben Schrader

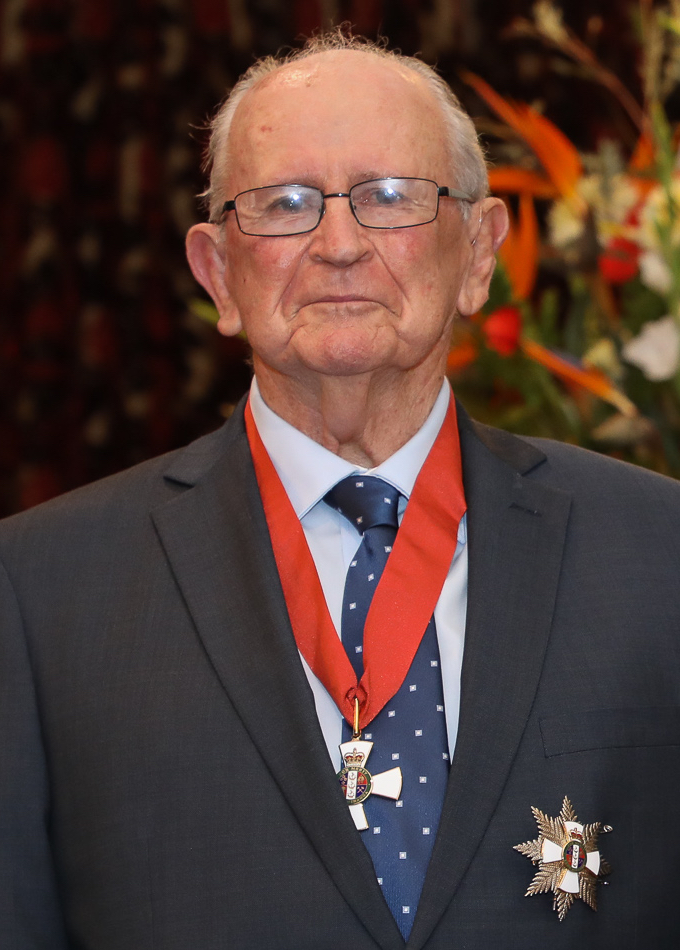
Sir Vincent O'Sullivan

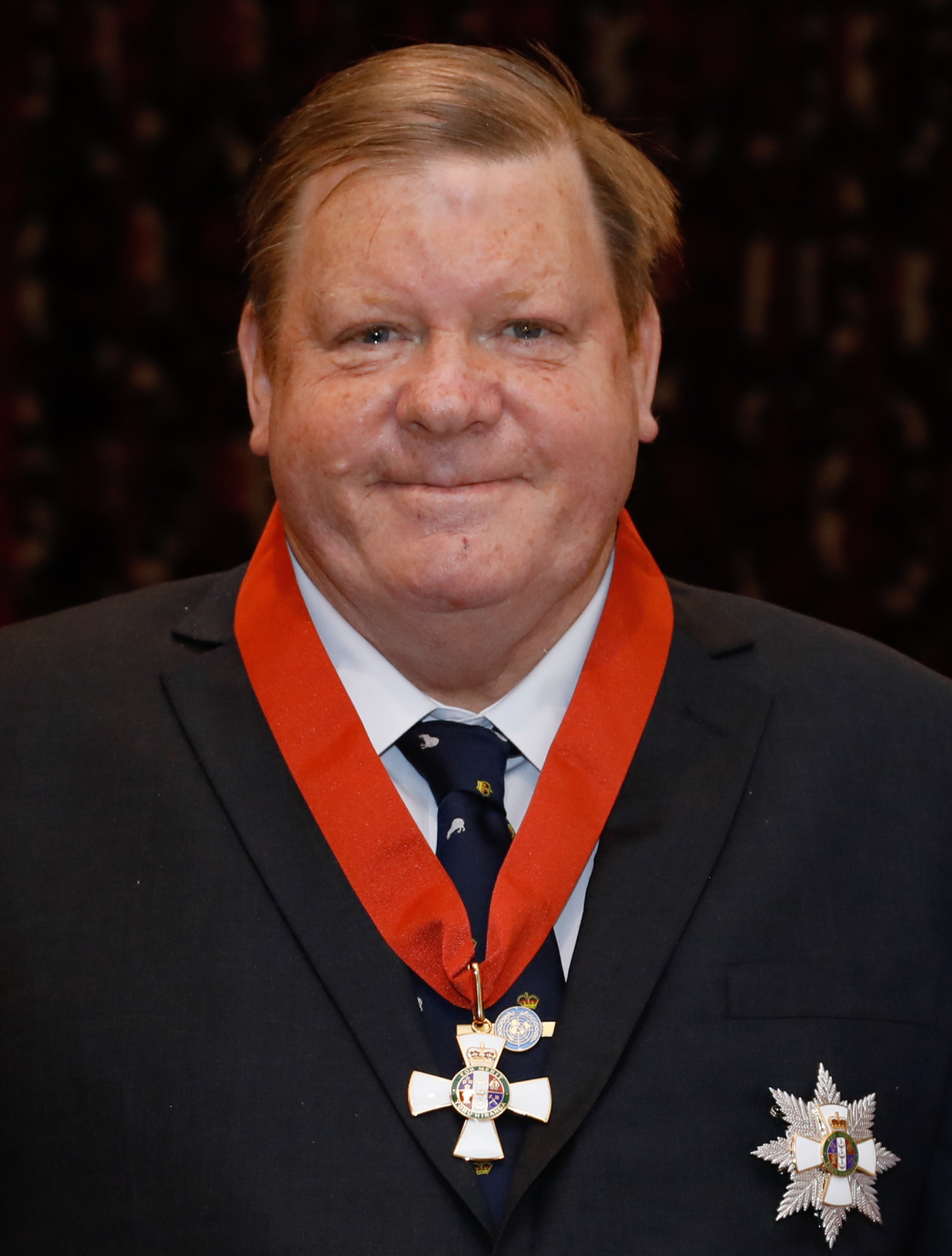
Sir Robert Martin

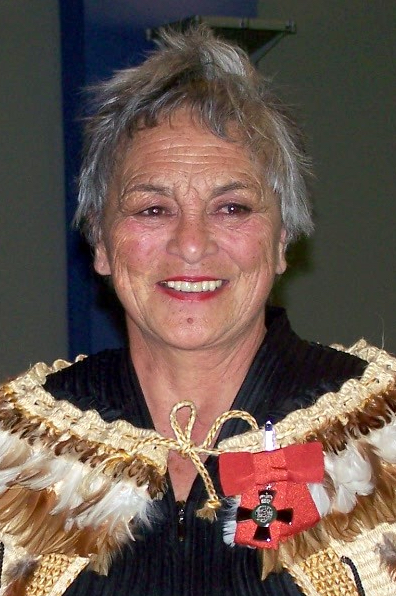
Ngapare Hopa

=== May ===
- 2 May
  - Derek Angus, politician, MP for Wallace (1981–1990) (born 1938).
  - David Heatherbell, oenologist (DSIR, Oregon State University, Lincoln University) (born 1941).
- 4 May
  - Judith Medlicott, lawyer and advocate, New Zealand Mastermind champion (1988), Chancellor of the University of Otago (1993–1998) (born 1942).
  - Oliver Stead, art historian and curator (Dunedin Public Art Gallery, Auckland War Memorial Museum, Alexander Turnbull Library) (born 1963).
- 5 May – Willie Hona, Hall of Fame musician (Herbs) (born 1953).
- 7 May
  - John Charles, film composer (Goodbye Pork Pie, Utu, The Quiet Earth) (born 1940).
  - Neil Grant, potter and ceramics teacher (Otago Polytechnic) (born 1938).
- 8 May – Shirley Warren, local politician and community leader (born 1940).
- 10 May
  - Janis Paterson, psychologist (Auckland University of Technology), founder of the Pacific Islands Families Study (2000) (born 1945).
  - Dick Webb, legal academic (University of Auckland) (born 1926).
- 11 May
  - Jock Allison, animal scientist, director of Invermay Research Centre (1978–1986), Bledisloe Medal (2003) (born 1943).
  - Colin Moyle, politician, MP for Manukau (1963–1969), Māngere (1969–1976), Hunua (1981–1984) and Otara (1984–1990), Minister of Agriculture (1972–1975, 1984–1990) (born 1929).
- 13 May – Richard Bolton, rugby league player (Auckland, New Zealand Māori, national team) and coach (Waikato, New Zealand Māori) (born 1943).
- 14 May – Dene O'Kane, snooker player (born 1963).
- 17 May
  - Joe Anderson, lawyer, judge, and territorial soldier, District Court judge (1972–1999), honorary colonel of the 4th Otago and Southland Battalion (born 1931).
  - Sid Going, Hall of Fame rugby union player (North Auckland, New Zealand Māori, national team) (born 1943).
- 20 May
  - Kevin Burns, cricketer (Southland, Otago) (born 1960).
  - David Penny, evolutionary biologist (Massey University), Marsden Medal (2000), Rutherford Medal (2004), Fellow of the Royal Society of New Zealand (since 1990) (born 1938).
- 22 May
  - Jane Coughlan, politician, member of the Ashburton Hospital Board (1974–1989), Timaru District Councillor (1992–2013) (born 1939).
  - John England, cricketer (Canterbury) (born 1940).
  - Jan Lothian, Commonwealth Games hurdler (1974), national 100-metre hurdles (1970 1976, 1977) and 400-metre hurdles champion (1976) (born c. 1948).
- 24 May – Heather Ayrton, journalist, coroner, and heritage advocate (born 1934).
- 27 May – Rodger Fox, trombonist, band leader (Rodger Fox Big Band), and jazz educator (New Zealand School of Music), Aotearoa Music Award for jazz recording of the year (1983, 2001, 2004, 2012) (born 1953).
- 28 May – Hugh Macdonald, film and television director (The Frog, the Dog and the Devil, The Governor (born 1943).
- 29 May – Leslie Watson, cricketer (Canterbury) (born 1956).
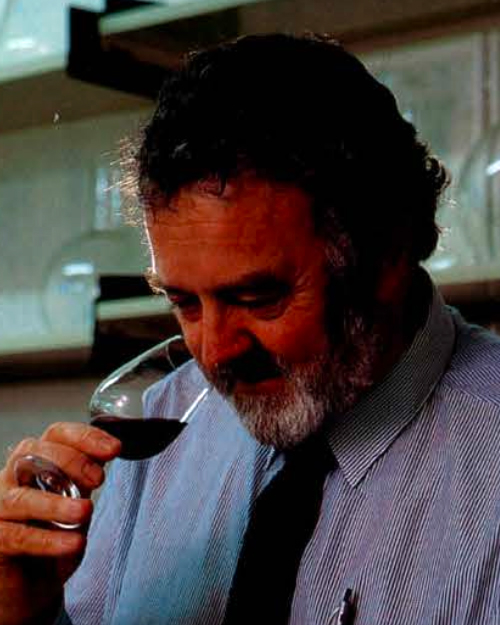
David Heatherbell

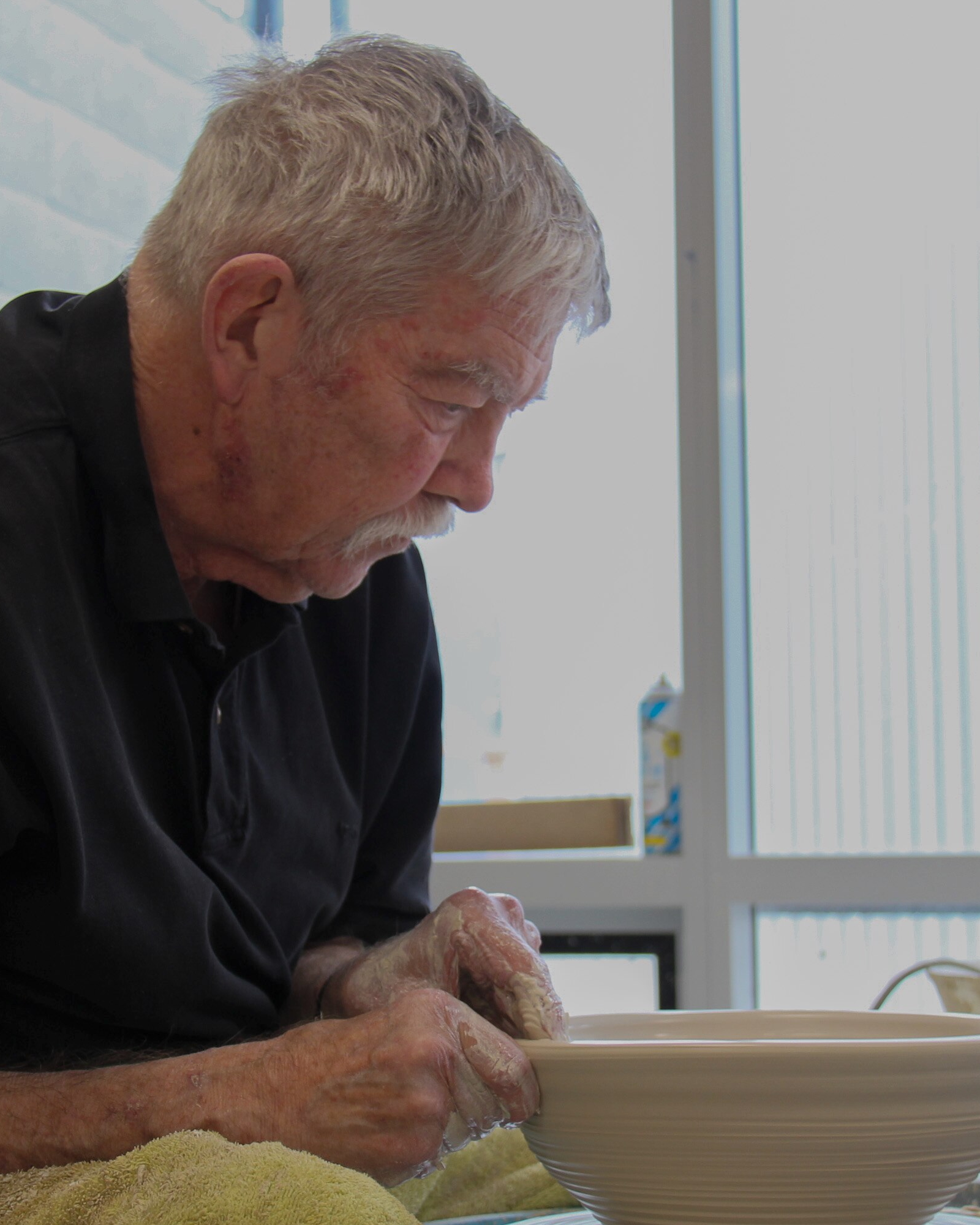
Neil Grant

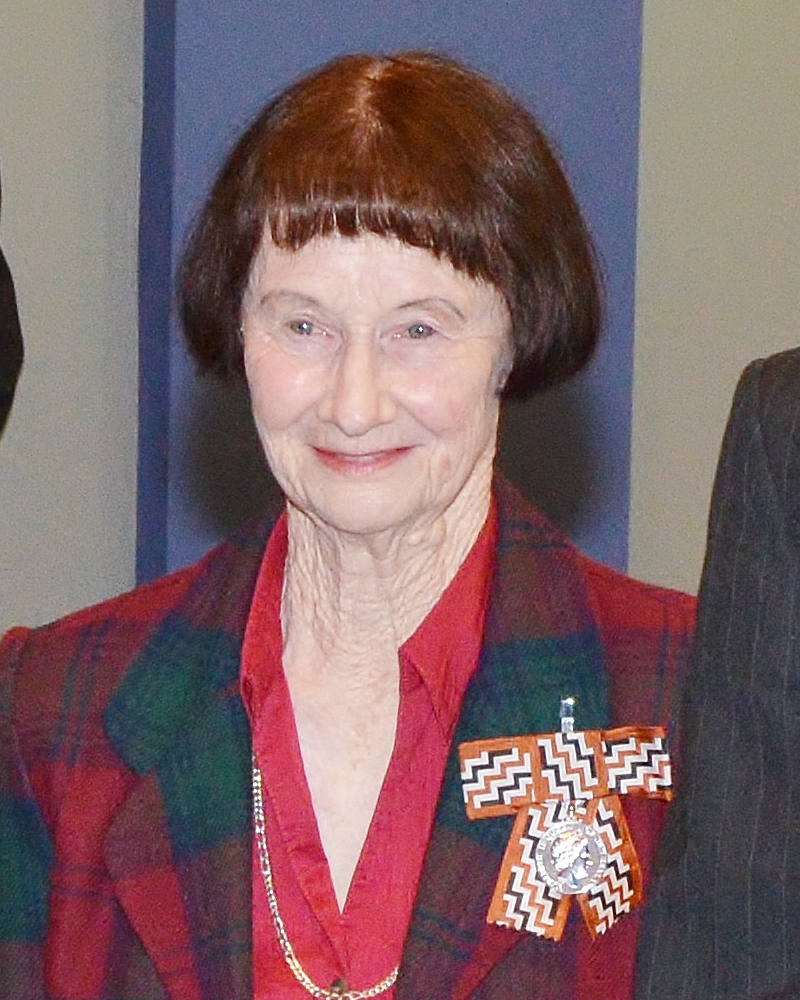
Shirley Warren

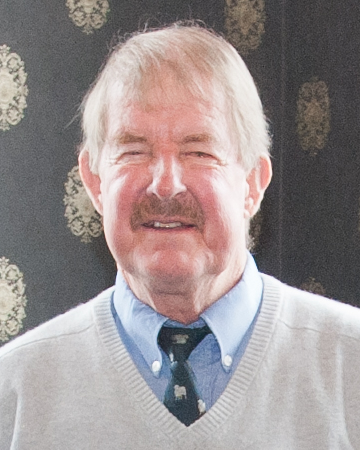
Jock Allison

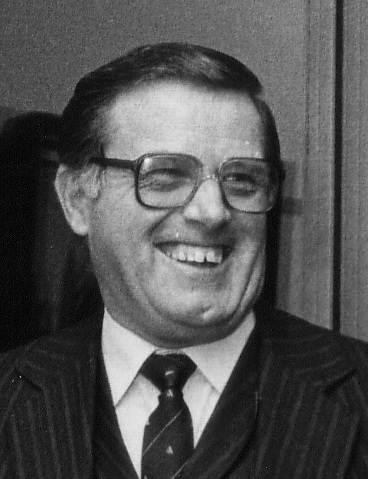
Colin Moyle

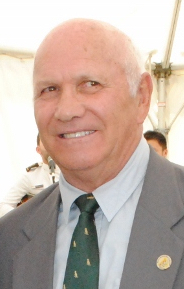
Sid Going

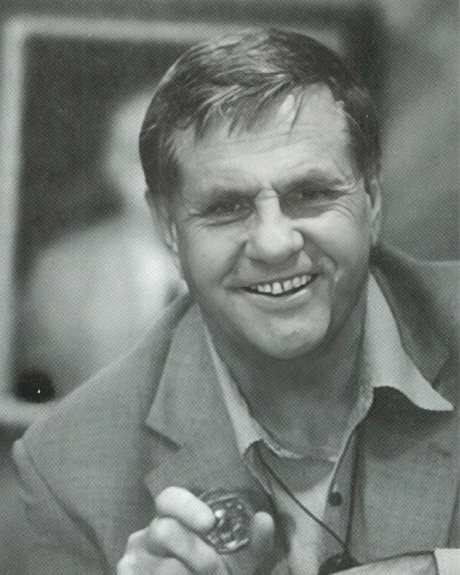
David Penny

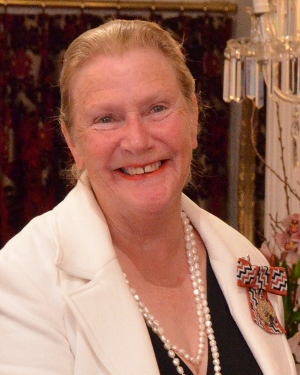
Jane Coughlan

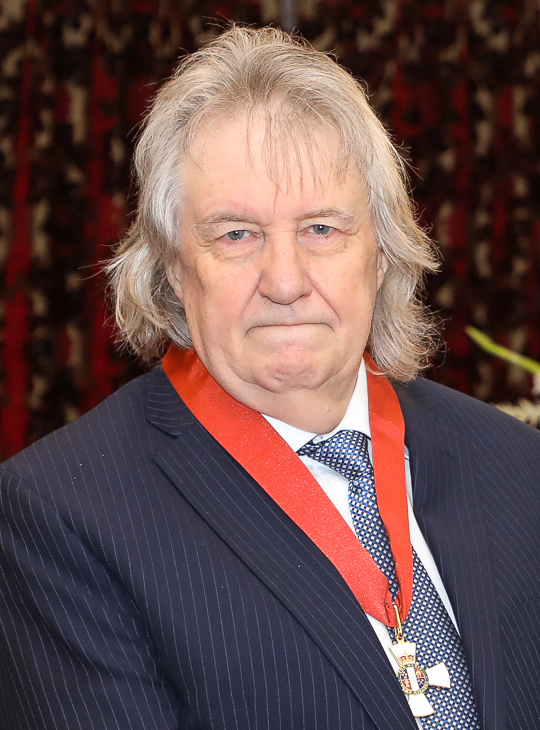
Rodger Fox

=== June ===
- 1 June – June, Lady Hillary, trekking guide, and advocate for the Nepalese community (born 1931).
- 2 June – Barbara Stewart, politician, New Zealand First list MP (2002–2008, 2011–2017) (born 1952).
- 4 June – Rex Kirton, local politician, Mayor of Upper Hutt (1977–2001), Wellington Regional Councillor (2001–2010) (born 1942).
- 8 June – Peter Duncan, lawyer and judge, District Court judge (1977–1995) (born 1927).
- 9 June – Ralph Caulton, rugby union player (Wellington, national team) and coach (national under-17 team) (born 1937).
- 10 June – Sheila O'Toole, Catholic nun, welfare worker (born 1929).
- 13 June – Graham Ansell, public servant and diplomat, High Commissioner to Fiji (1973–1976), Ambassador to Belgium (1977–1980), Ambassador to Japan (1983–1984), High Commissioner to Australia (1985–1989), Secretary of External Relations and Trade (1989–1991).
- 17 June
  - Connor Garden-Bachop, rugby union player (Wellington, Highlanders, Māori All Blacks) (born 1999).
  - Priscilla Williams, public servant and diplomat, High Commissioner to Tonga (1983–1985), High Commissioner to India (1989–1993) (born 1940).
- 20 June – Sally Sloman, opera singer (born 1946).
- 21 June – Keith Locke, activist and politician, Green list MP (1999–2011) (born 1944).
- 22 June – Ken Stevens, education academic (James Cook University, Victoria University of Wellington, Memorial University of Newfoundland) (born 1946).
- 23 June – Glen, Lady Rowling, community leader and the spouse of the prime minister Bill Rowling (born 1930).
- 25 June – Shayne Philpott, rugby union player (Canterbury, national team) (born 1965).
- 26 June – Mary, Lady Hardie Boys, watercolourist, vice-regal consort (1996–2001) (born 1933).
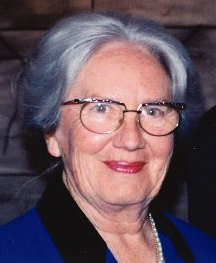
June, Lady Hillary

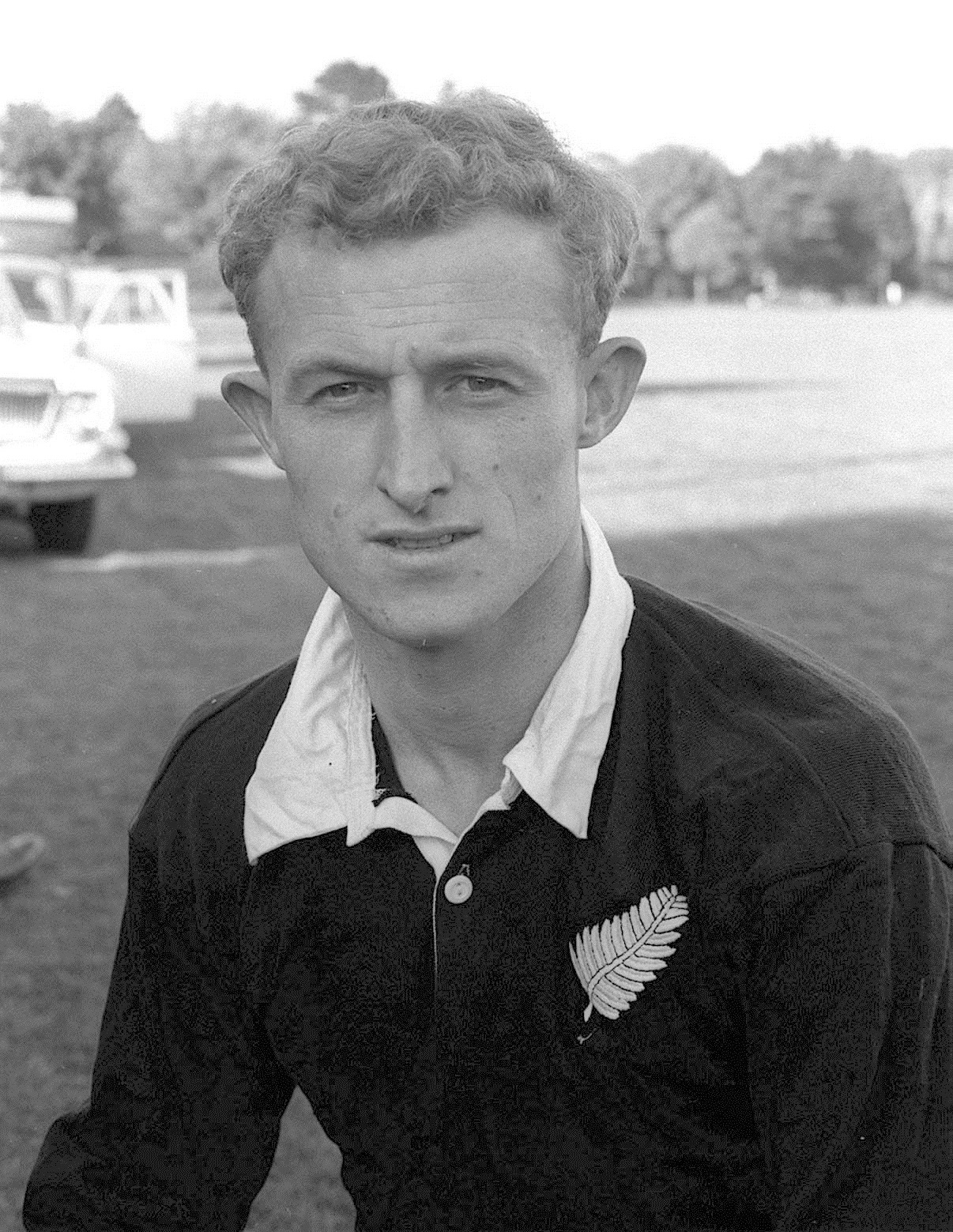
Ralph Caulton

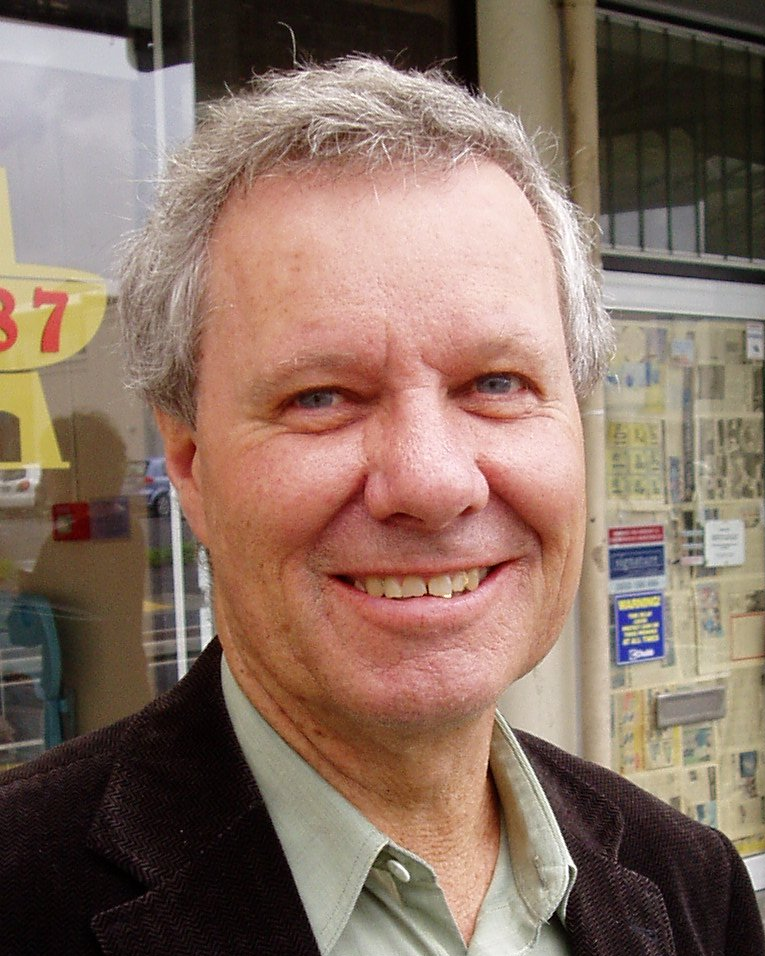
Keith Locke

Glen Rowling

=== July ===
- 4 July – Sylvia Fausett, community worker (born 1933).
- 6 July
  - John Laurenson, lawyer and judge, King's Counsel (since 1989), High Court judge (1996–2005) (born 1937).
  - Harry Morgan, cricketer (Wellington) (born 1938).
- 9 July – Diana Hill, biochemist (University of Otago), Fellow of the Royal Society of New Zealand (since 1997).
- 12 July – Billy Ibadulla, cricketer (Warwickshire, Otago, Pakistan national team), cricket coach, umpire and commentator (born 1935).
- 16 July – Norm Hewitt, rugby union player (Hawke's Bay, Hurricanes, national team), Dancing with the Stars winner (2005).
- 17 July – Michael Kenny, Olympic boxer (1984), Commonwealth Games gold medallist (1990) (born 1964).
- 19 July – Trevor Burnard, historian (University of Canterbury, University of Melbourne, University of Hull) (born 1960).
- 21 July – Laurie Byers, Olympic cyclist (1964) and local politician, British Empire and Commonwealth Games bronze medallist (1962, 1966), Far North District Councillor (1992–2010) (born 1941).
- 22 July
  - Janet Mackey, politician, MP for Gisborne (1993–1996), Mahia (1996–1999) and East Coast (1999–2005) (born 1953).
  - Patrick Neville, air force officer, Chief of the Air Staff (1986–1988) (born 1932).
  - Ros Whiting, accounting academic (University of Otago) and chartered accountant (born 1958).
- 28 July
  - Jim Newbigin, cricketer (Wellington) (born 1931).
  - Martin Phillipps, singer-songwriter and guitarist (The Chills) (born 1963).
- 30 July
  - Kevin Laidlaw, rugby union player (Southland, national team) and coach (Southland) (born 1934).
  - Young Sēkona, Tongan-born boxer, South Pacific Games silver medallist (1969), NZPBA heavyweight champion (1982–1983) (born 1952).
- 31 July
  - Sir Colin Maiden, mechanical engineer, university administrator and company director, vice-chancellor of the University of Auckland (1971–1994), Thomson Medal (1986) (born 1933).
  - Vernice Wineera, poet, editor and educator (Brigham Young University–Hawaii), first Māori woman to publish a poetry collection (1978) (born 1938).
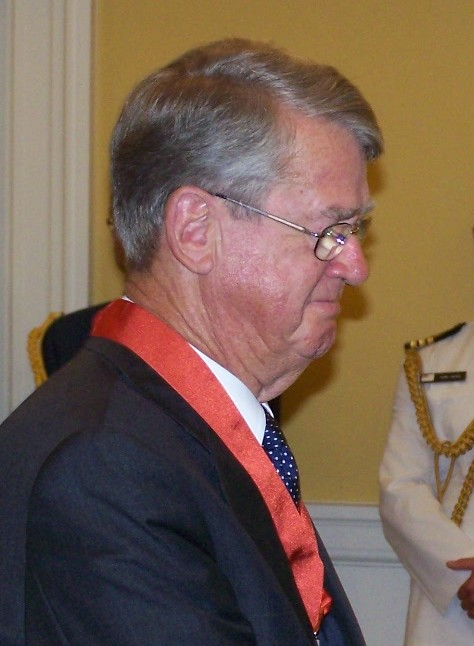
John Laurenson

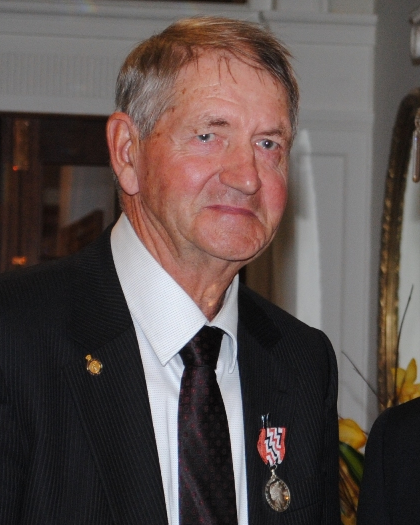
Laurie Byers

=== August ===
- 3 August – Douglas Ewen, lawyer, King's Counsel (since 2024) (born 1967).
- 5 August – Maurice Cockerill, rugby union player (Taranaki, national team) (born 1928).
- 6 August – Dave Quested, cricket umpire (born 1946).
- 10 August
  - Dame June Mariu, netballer (national team) and Māori community leader, president of the Māori Women's Welfare League (1987–1990) (born 1932).
  - Dean Roberts, musician (Thela) and composer (born 1975).
- 11 August – James Liu, psychologist (Victoria University of Wellington, Massey University).
- 12 August – Lester Davey, biochemist, director of the Meat Industry Research Institute of New Zealand (1977–1987) (born 1929).
- 15 August – Rowena Jackson, prima ballerina (Sadler's Wells Ballet) and artistic director (Royal New Zealand Ballet) (born 1926).
- 16 August – Robin Sampson, Olympic archer (1972) (born 1940).
- 17 August – Peter Aimer, political scientist (University of Auckland) (born 1934).
- 20 August – Brooke Rangi, association footballer (national team), and track and field athlete, Oceania Championships silver medallist (2000) (born 1982).
- 23 August
  - Nathan Dahlberg, racing cyclist, winner of Tour du Maroc (2001) and Tour d'Indonesia (2004) (born 1964).
  - Kevin Hickman, Hall of Fame businessman (Ryman Healthcare), athletics coach, and Thoroughbred racehorse owner and breeder (Silent Achiever) (born 1950).
- 24 August
  - Garrick Murfitt, farmer and local politician, Pahiatua County Councillor (1985–1988), member (1989–2010) and chair (2004–2010) of Horizons Regional Council (born 1941).
  - Stephen E. Thorpe, entomologist (born 1970).
- 25 August – Rod Vaughan, journalist (TVNZ, TV3) (born 1947).
- 28 August – Roger Stevenson, music teacher (Havelock North High School) and choral director, New Zealand Secondary Students' Choir musical director (1987–2000) (born 1944).
- 30 August
  - Tūheitia Paki, Māori King (since 2006) (born 1955).
  - Sir Shridath Ramphal, Guyanese statesman, Commonwealth Secretary-General (1975–1990), honorary Member of the Order of New Zealand (since 1990) (born 1928).
  - Neale Thompson, badminton player and cricketer (Otago) (born 1937).
- 31 August
  - Peter Gresham, politician, MP for Waitotara (1990–1996), National list MP (1996–1999), Minister of Social Welfare (1993–1996), Minister of Senior Citizens (1993–1996) (born 1933).
  - Sir Harold Marshall, acoustician and architect, Fellow of the Royal Society of New Zealand (since 1994), Wallace Clement Sabine Medal (1995), Pickering Medal (2013), Rayleigh Medal (2015) (born 1931).
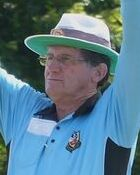
Dave Quested

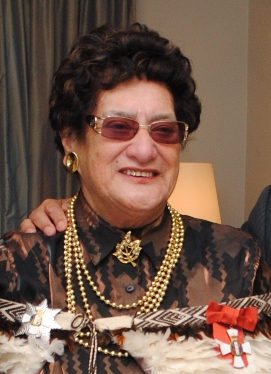
Dame June Mariu

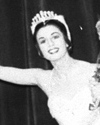
Rowena Jackson

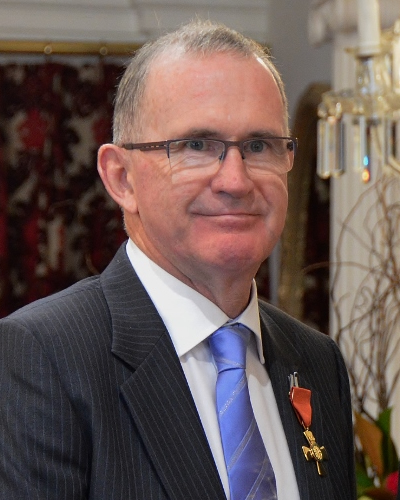
Kevin Hickman

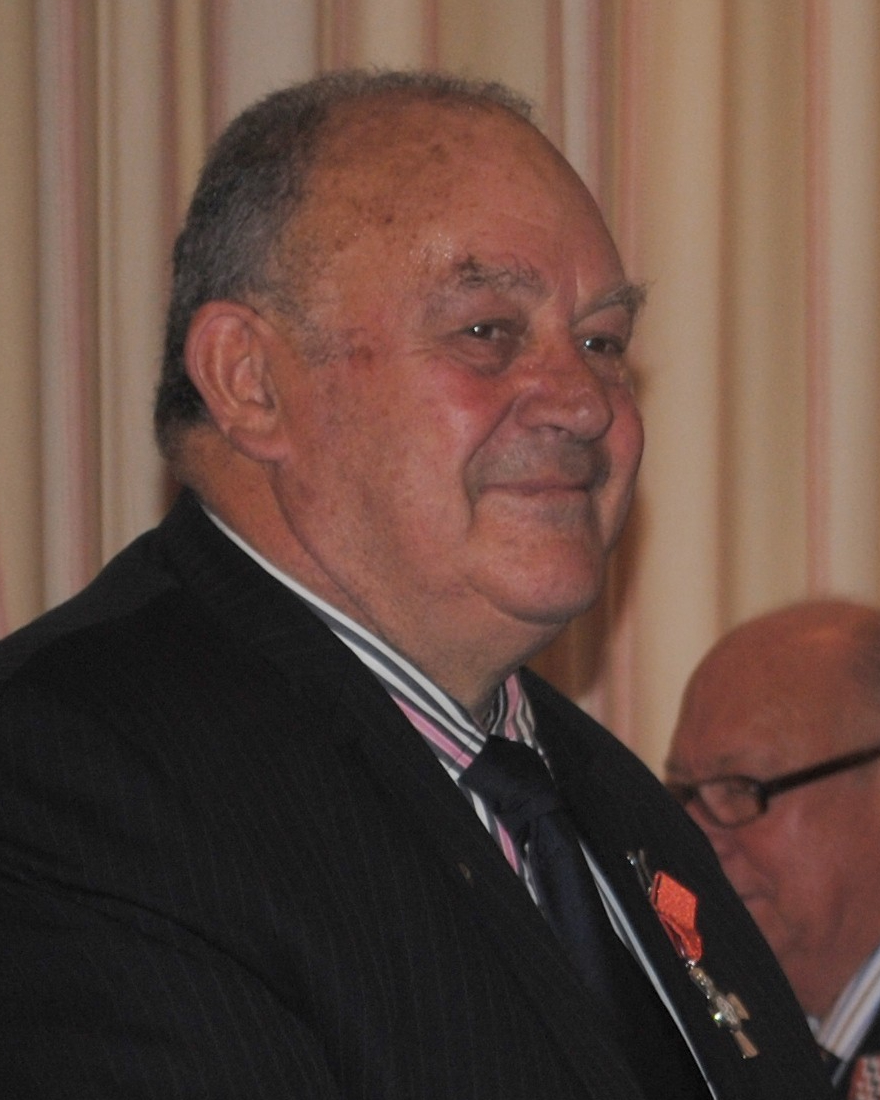
Garrick Murfitt

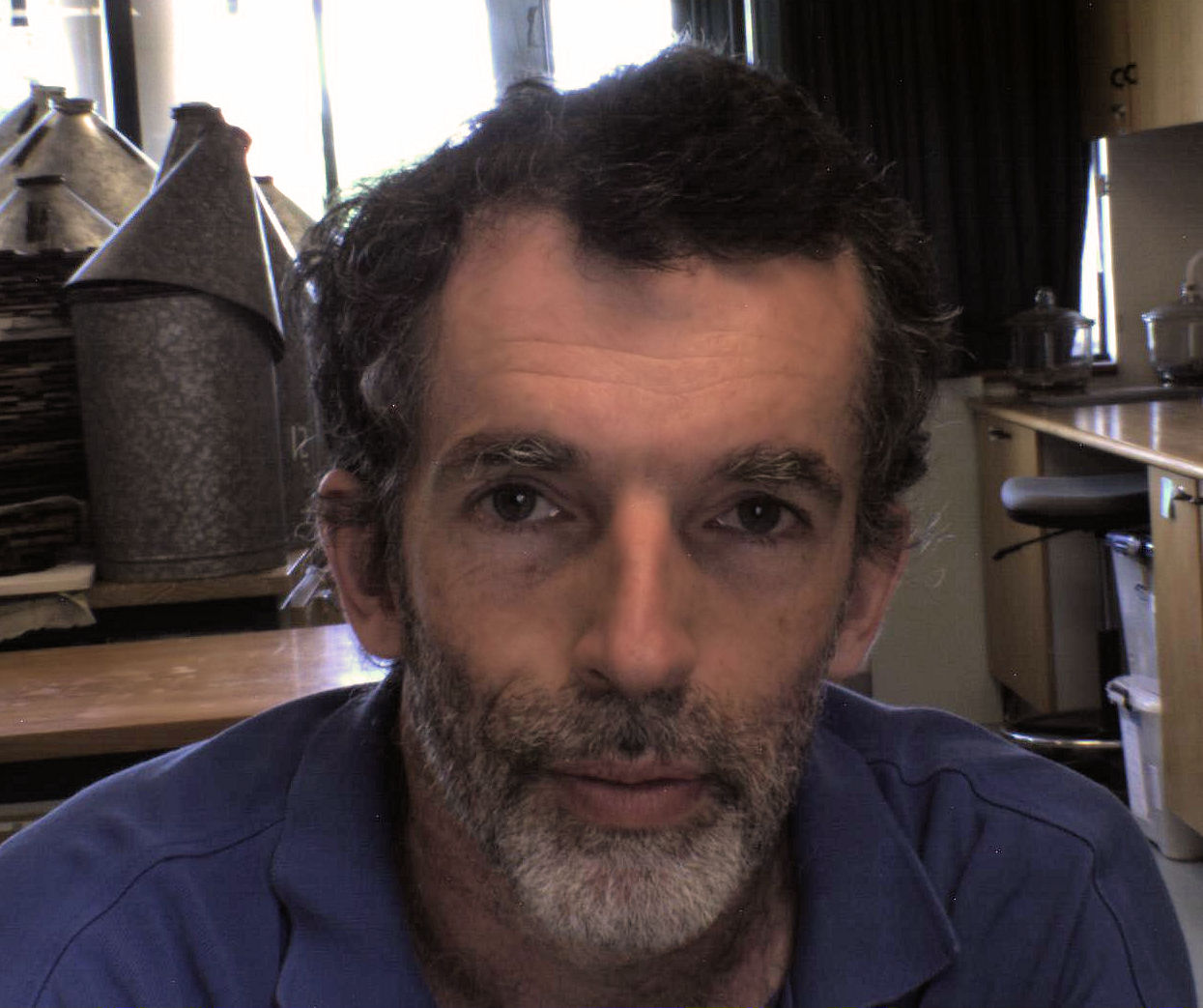
Stephen Thorpe

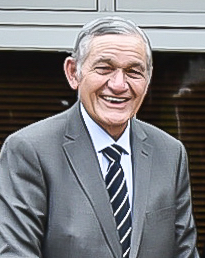
Tūheitia Paki

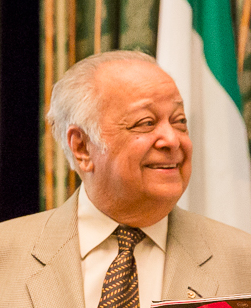
Sir Sonny Ramphal

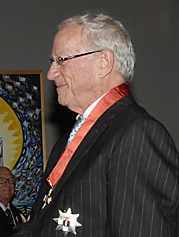
Sir Harold Marshall

=== September ===
- 1 September
  - Denis Browne, Roman Catholic prelate, Bishop of Rarotonga (1977–1983), Bishop of Auckland (1983–1994), Bishop of Hamilton (1994–2014) (born 1937).
  - James Guild, farmer and conservationist, chair of the Queen Elizabeth II National Trust (2011–2020) (born c. 1949).
- 3 September
  - Beverley Shore Bennett, portrait artist, stained-glass artist (Napier Cathedral, Wellington Cathedral of St Paul), and embroiderer (born 1928).
  - Dougal Thorburn, general practitioner, public health medicine specialist and athlete, national marathon champion (2013) (born 1981).
- 10 September – Doug Hood, musician (The Clean), record producer (Flying Nun Records), and music promoter (born 1953).
- 11 September – Aussie Malcolm, politician and businessman, MP for Eden (1975–1984), Minister of Immigration (1981–1984), Minister of Health (1981–1984) (born 1940).
- 13 September – George Mason, botanist, chemist and philanthropist (born 1930).
- 14 September – Glenis Levestam, actress (Close to Home, City Life, Black Sheep) (born 1937).
- 17 September – Ron McDowall, engineer, Distinguished Fellow of Engineering New Zealand (since 2019) (born 1951).
- 18 September – Sam Malcolmson, association footballer (Albion Rovers, Stop Out, national team) (born 1947).
- 21 September – Eddie Low, country and folk singer and musician, Benny Award (2009) (born 1943).
- 22 September
  - Max Cresswell, philosopher and logician (Victoria University of Wellington), Fellow of the Royal Society of New Zealand (since 2011) (born 1939).
  - Peter Dallas, radio announcer (4ZB, Concert FM, National Programme).
- 24 September – Steve Hinds, rugby union player (Wellington) and official, and police officer, World Rugby citing commissioner manager (since 2017), president of the New Zealand Police Association (1989–1995) (born 1955).
- 26 September – Alvin Pankhurst, magic realism artist (born 1949).
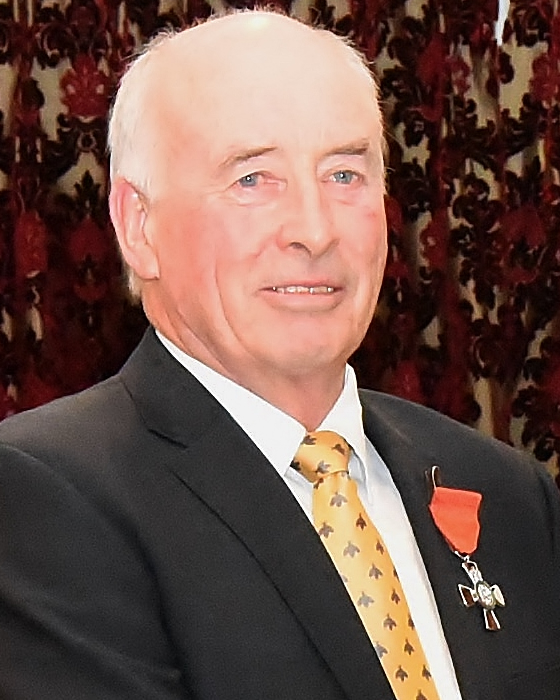
James Guild

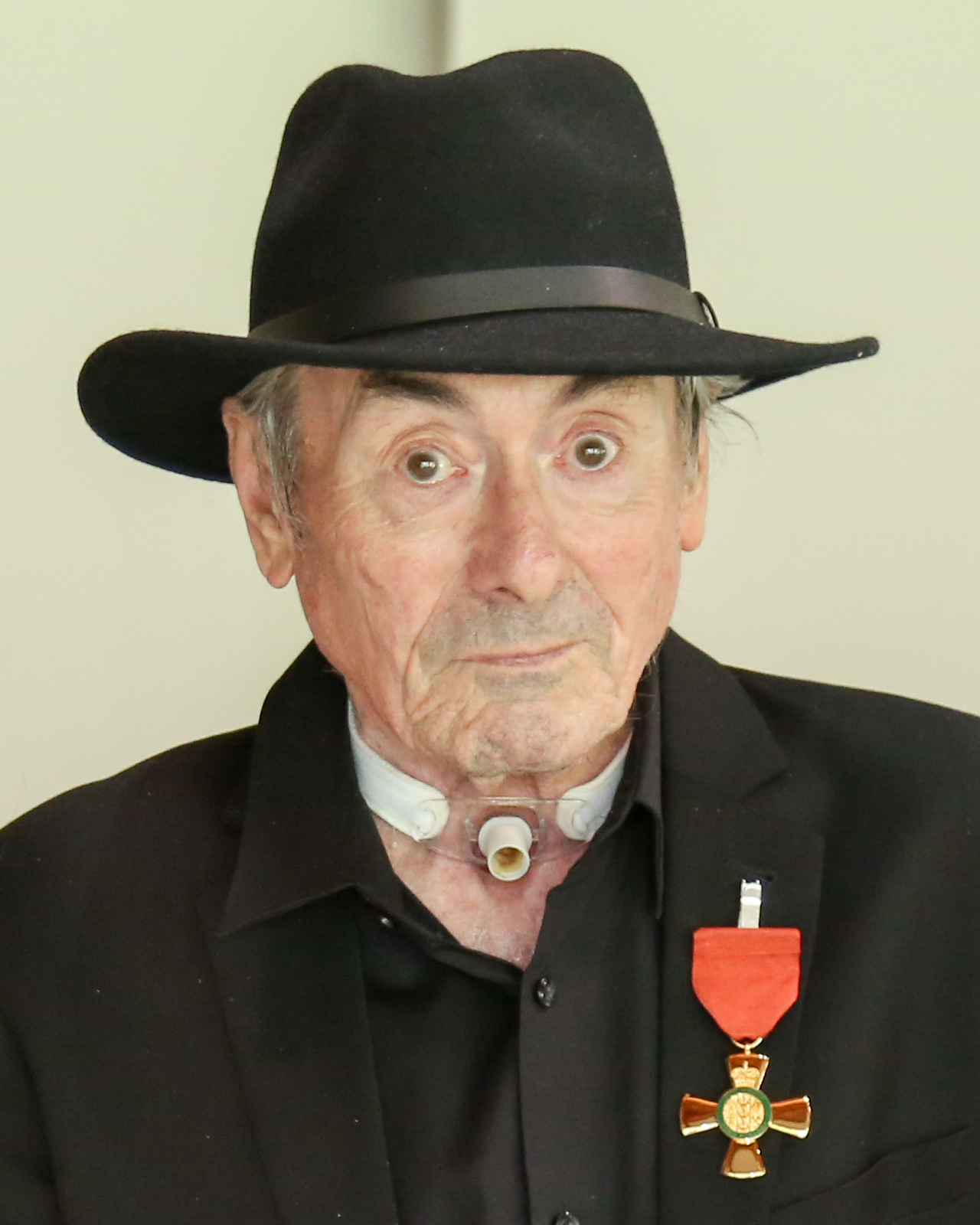
Doug Hood

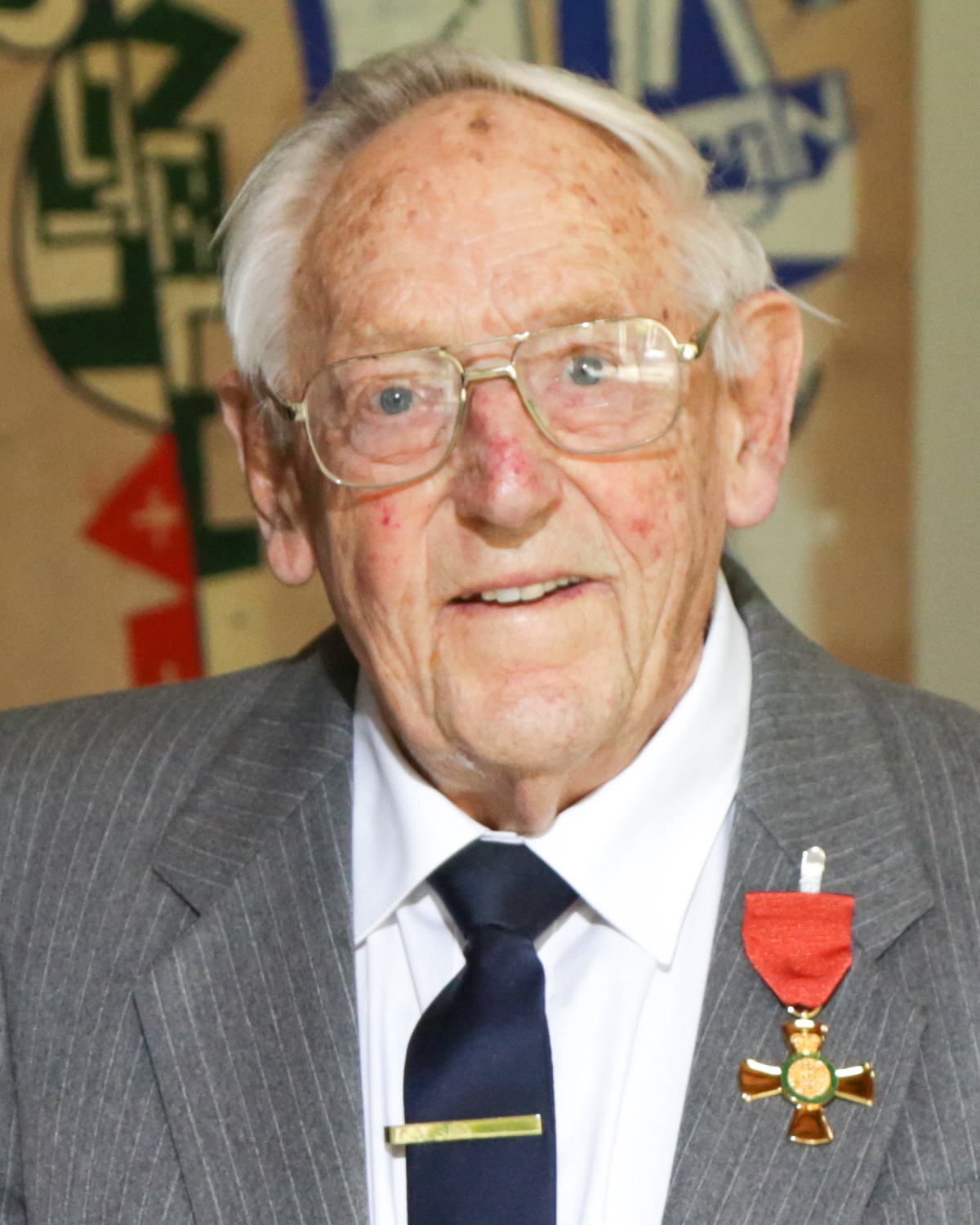
George Mason

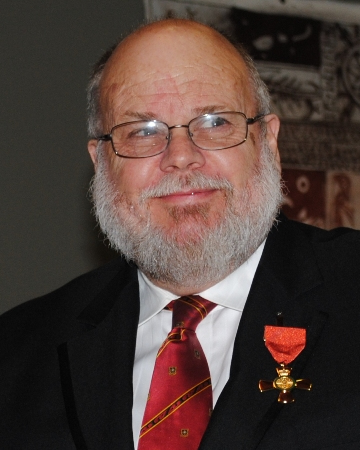
Ron McDowall

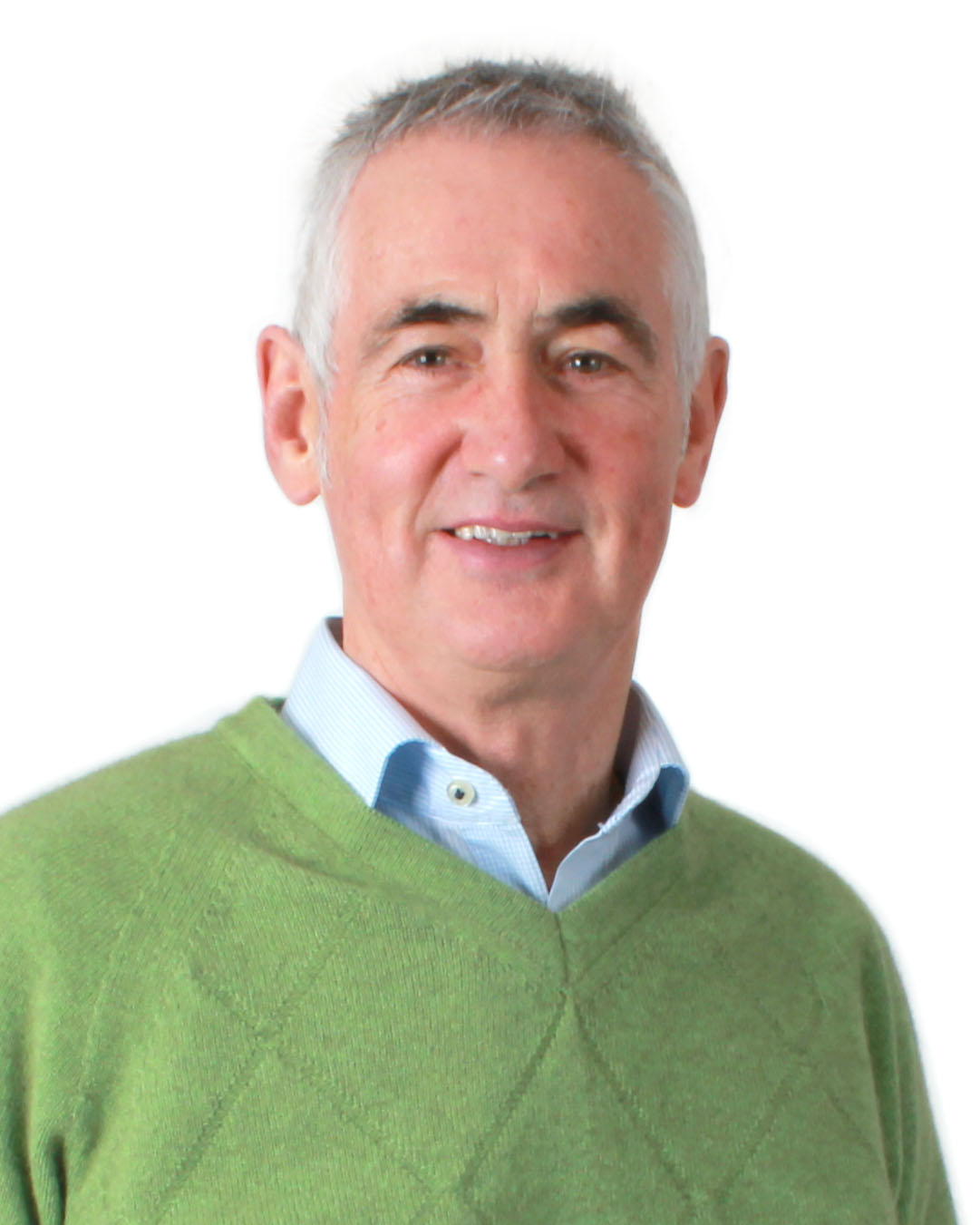
Sam Malcolmson

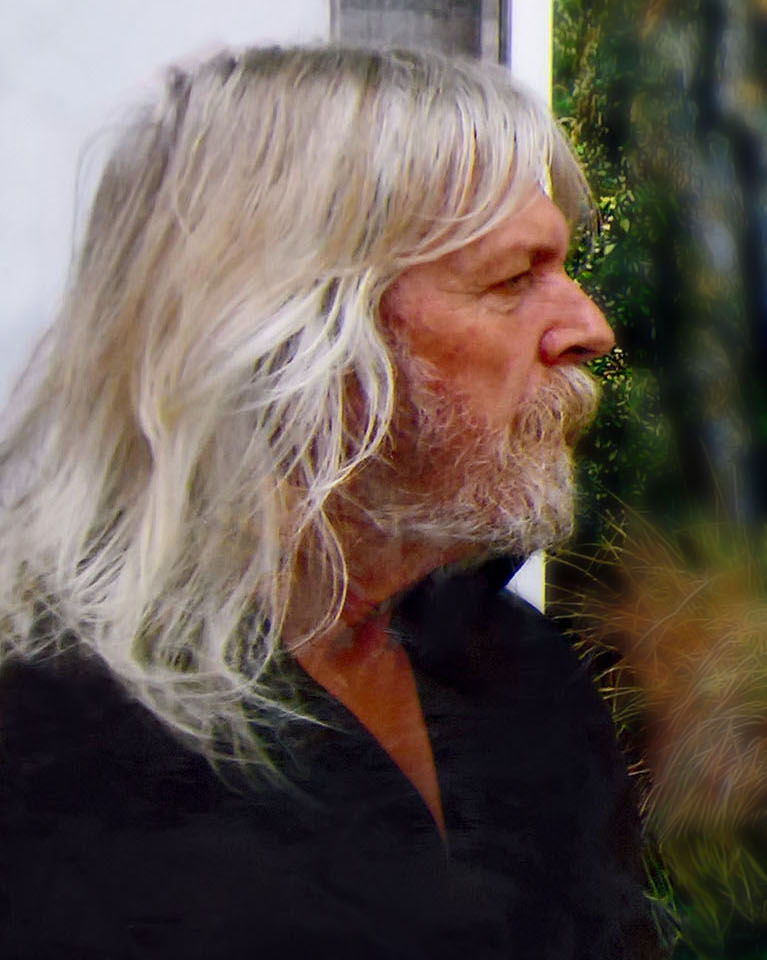
Alvin Pankhurst

=== October ===
- 2 October – Gerald Kember, rugby union player (Wellington, national team) (born 1945).
- 4 October – Linzy Forbes, poet (born 1952).
- 7 October – Brian Hastings, cricketer (Wellington, Central Districts, Canterbury, national team).
- 8 October – Frank Habicht, photographer (born 1938).
- 10 October – Fleur Adcock, poet, Cholmondeley Award (1976), Queen's Gold Medal for Poetry (2006), Fellow of the Royal Society of Literature (since 1984) (born 1934).
- 13 October – Dame Elizabeth Hanan, local-body politician, science educator, and community leader, deputy mayor of Dunedin (1998–2004) (born 1937).
- 14 October – Robert Maxwell, cricketer (Otago) (born 1945).
- 16 October – Alan Mansfield, Hall of Fame musician (Dragon), record producer ("Rain") and songwriter ("Young Years") (born c. 1952).
- 18 October
  - Burns Macaskill, marine chemist (National Institute of Water and Atmospheric Research) (born 1941).
  - Johnathan Parkes, jockey, Auckland Cup (2018, 2021), New Zealand Derby (2022), New Zealand St. Leger (2019) (born 1988).
- 19 October
  - Robert Ludbrook, lawyer and legal campaigner, co-founder of Citizens Advice Bureau New Zealand (born 1934).
  - Theo Spierings, businessman, chief executive officer of Fonterra (2011–2018) (born 1964).
- 22 October – David Andersen, cricketer (Auckland, Northern Districts) (born 1939).
- 24 October
  - Tony Lanigan, civil engineer, chancellor of Auckland University of Technology (2000–2001) (born 1948).
  - Henry Lowen-Smith, artist (born 1935).
- 29 October – Tony Signal, physicist (Massey University) (born 1962).
- 31 October – David Vere-Jones, statistician and probabilist (Victoria University of Wellington), Rhodes Scholar (1958), New Zealand Science and Technology Gold Medal (1999), Fellow of the Royal Society of New Zealand (since 1982) (born 1936).
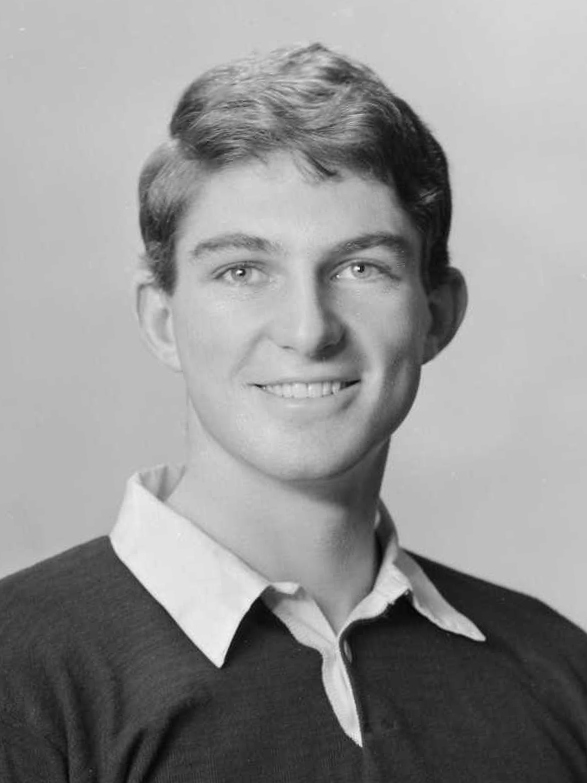
Gerald Kember

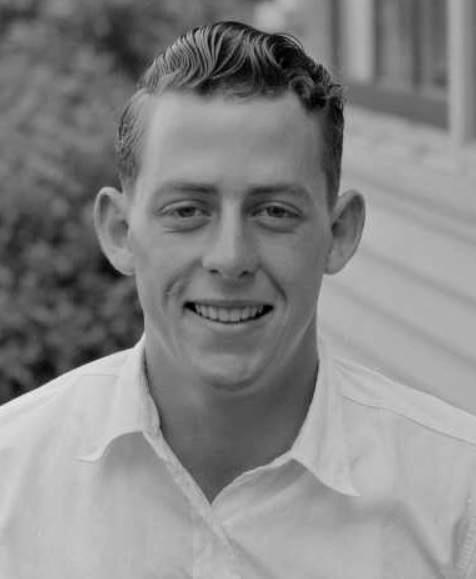
Brian Hastings

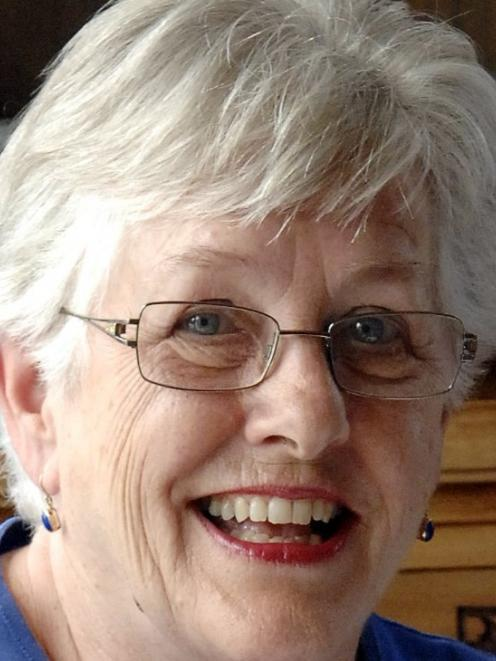
Dame Elizabeth Hanan

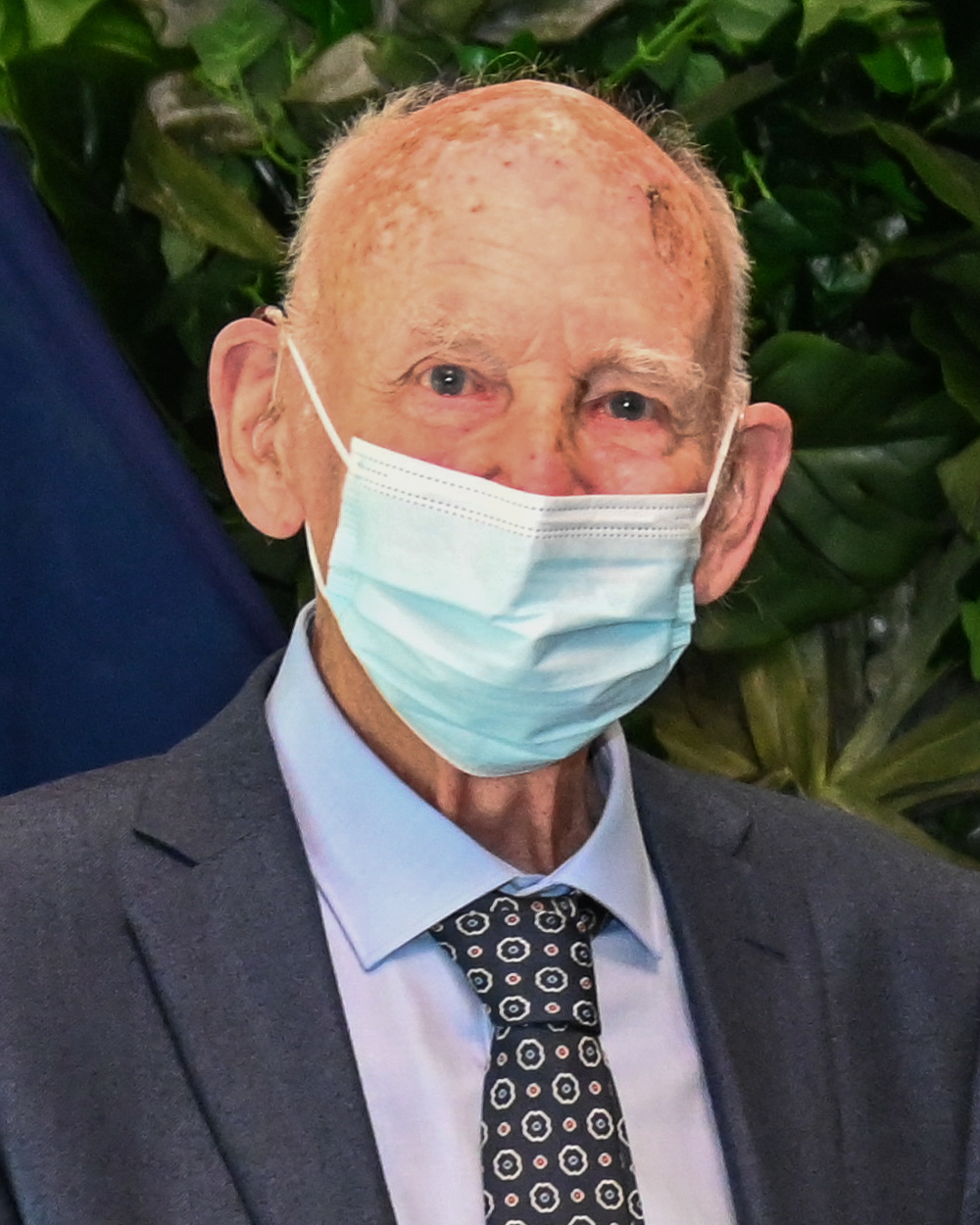
Robert Ludbrook

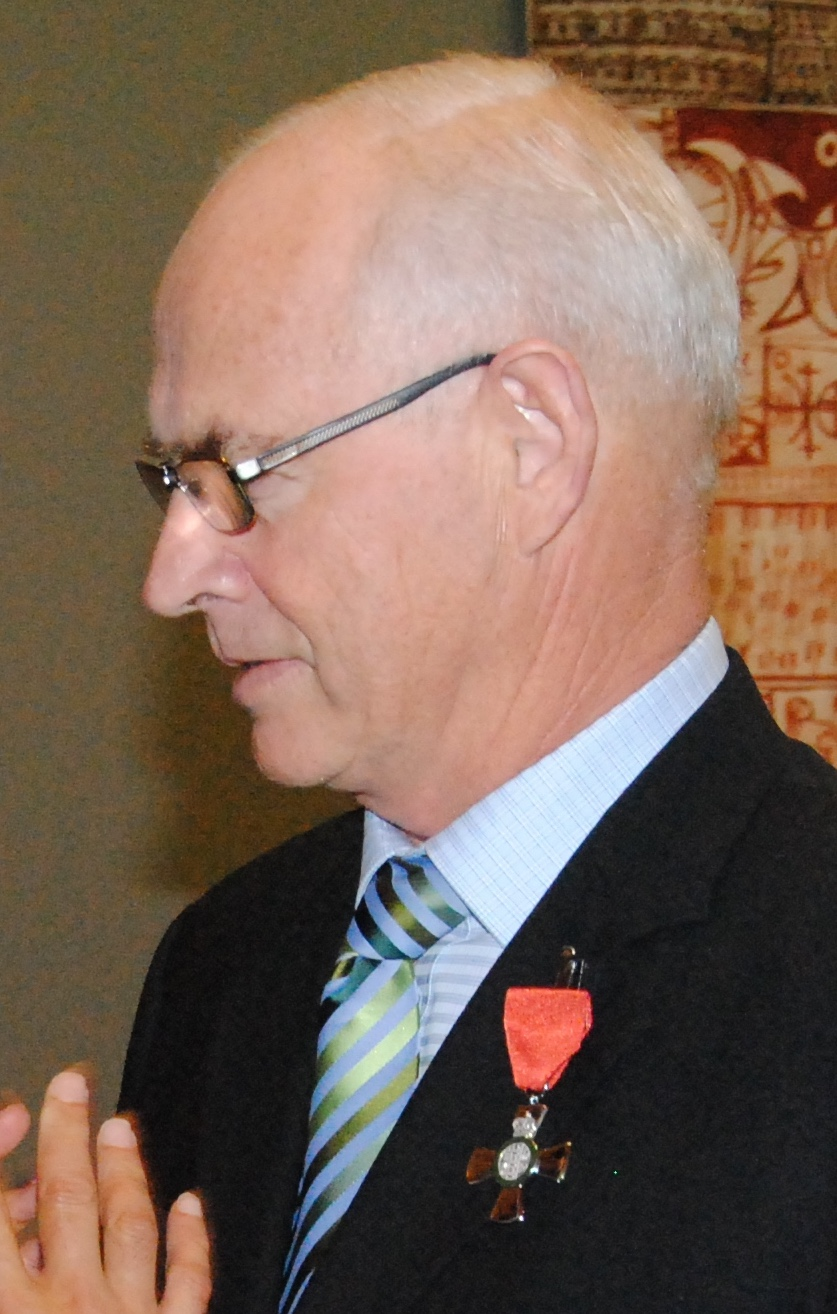
Tony Lanigan

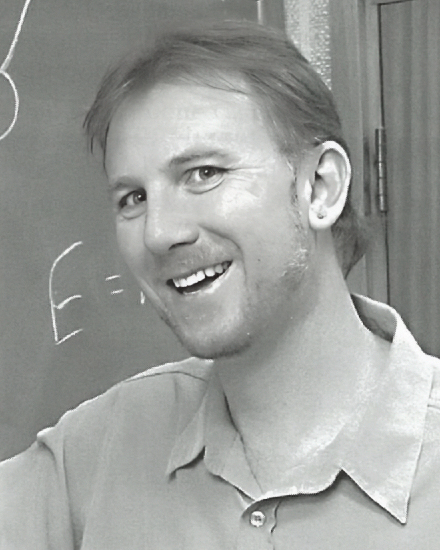
Tony Signal

=== November ===
- 2 November – Maree Lawrence, sculptor (born 1939).
- 5 November – Marise Chamberlain, Hall of Fame middle-distance athlete, Olympic bronze medallist (1964), British Empire and Commonwealth Games silver medallist (1962), women's mile world record holder (1962–1967) (born 1935).
- 7 November – Sir Bom Gillies, soldier, last surviving member of the Māori Battalion (born 1925).
- 8 November – William Gillespie, orthopaedic surgeon, dean of University of Otago Dunedin School of Medicine (1998–2002) and Hull York Medical School (2003–2007) (born 1940).
- 12 November – Lindsay Yeo, radio personality (2ZB) (born 1946).
- 14 November – Elaine Lee, association footballer (Blockhouse Bay, Eastern Suburbs, national team), Asian Cup champion (1975) (born 1957).
- 15 November – Richard Mulgan, political scientist (University of Auckland, University of Otago, Australian National University), member of the Royal Commission on the Electoral System (born 1940).
- 18 November – Rangi Hetet, master carver (born 1937).
- 19 November – Roy Christian, rugby league player (Auckland, national team), and Presbyterian minister (born 1943).
- 20 November – Rosemary O'Brien, field hockey player (national team) (born 1937).
- 21 November
  - Barry Coley, cricketer (Wellington) (born 1946).
  - Mei Whaitiri, model for the Pania of the Reef statue (born 1938).
  - Kathleen Wharton, rugby league player, World Cup champion (2008) (born 1983).
- 22 November
  - Les Coffman, association football referee, FIFA international referee (1968–1980) (born 1929).
  - Dave Wickenden, Commonwealth Games boxer (1990) (born 1970).
- 23 November
  - Helen Hughes, botanist (DSIR), Parliamentary Commissioner for the Environment (1987–1996) (born 1929).
  - Nikki Kaye, politician, MP for Auckland Central (2008–2020), Minister for Youth (2013–2017), Minister of Civil Defence (2013–2016), Minister of Education (2017), deputy leader of the National Party and deputy leader of the Opposition (2020) (born 1980).
- 27 November – Angus Macfarlane, education academic (University of Waikato, University of Canterbury), Fellow of the Royal Society of New Zealand (since 2018).
- 29 November – John Dalmer, lawyer and judge, District Court judge (1978–2003) (born 1938).
- 30 November – Peter Yealands, aquaculture and winery entrepreneur (Yealands Estate) (born c. 1948).
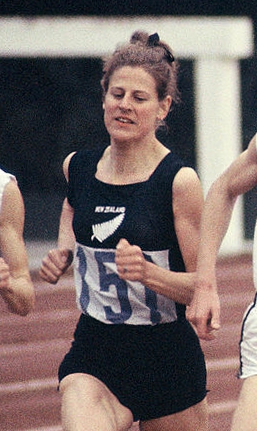
Marise Chamberlain

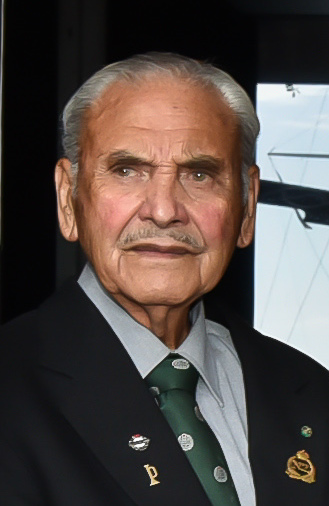
Sir Bom Gillies

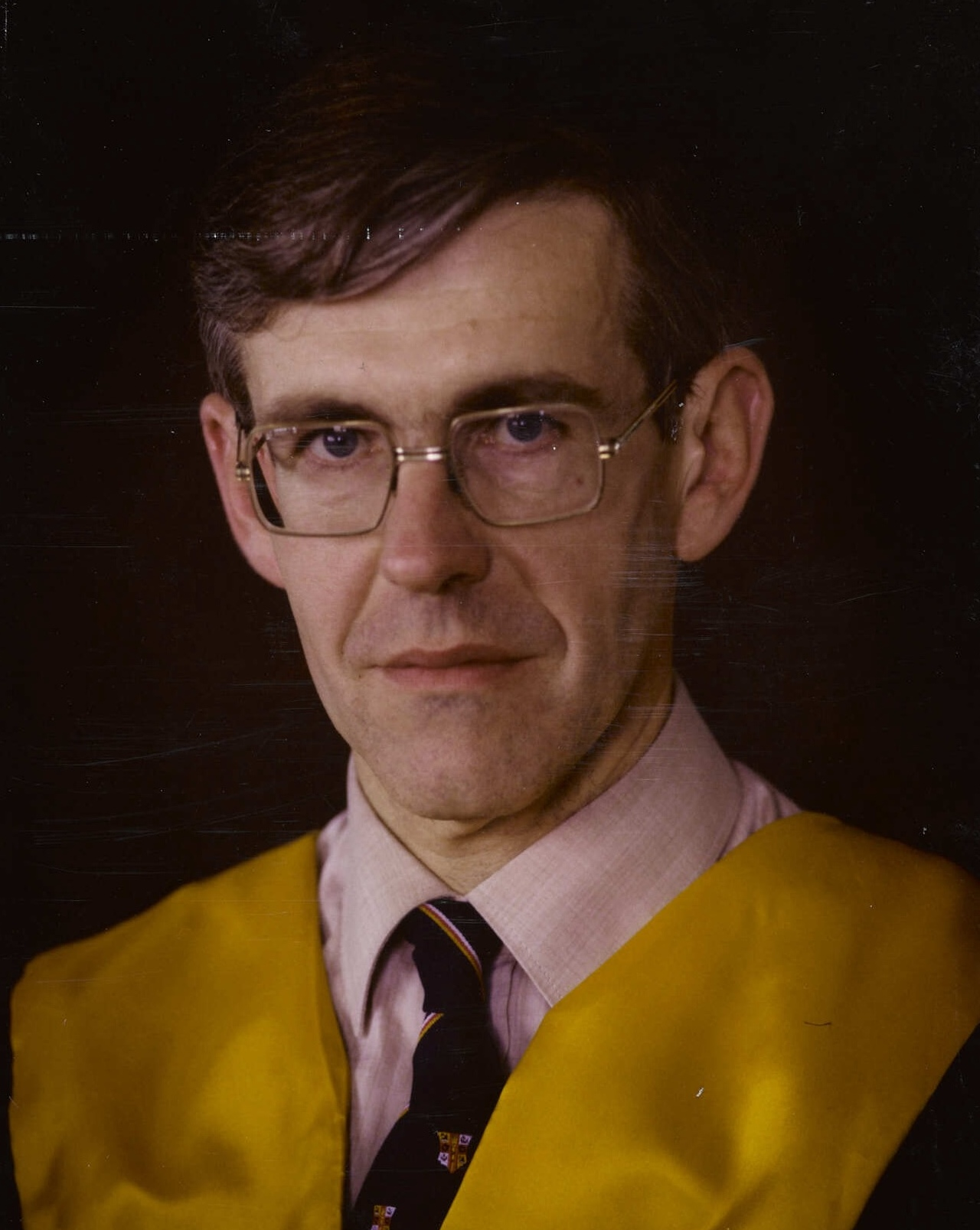
William Gillespie

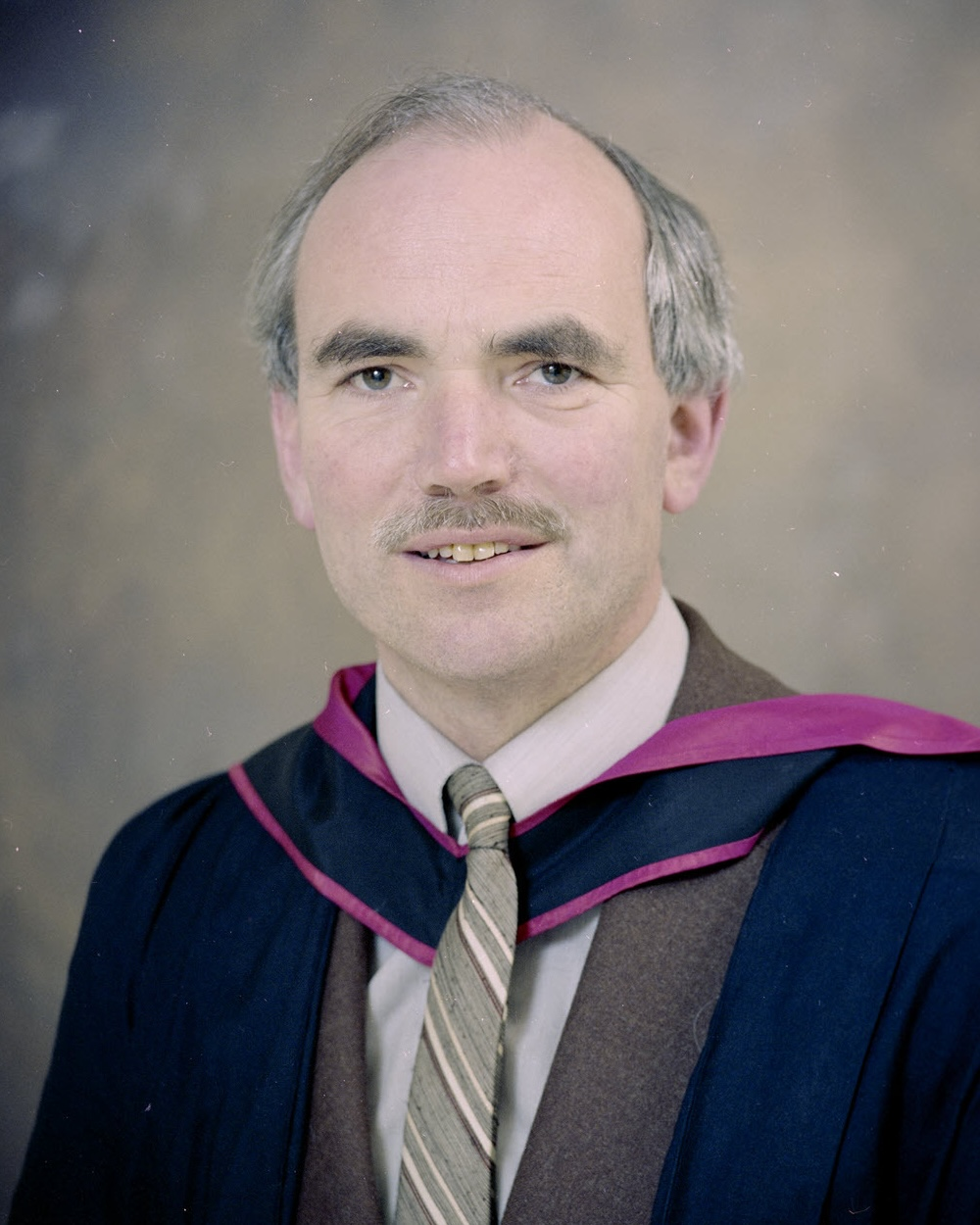
Richard Mulgan

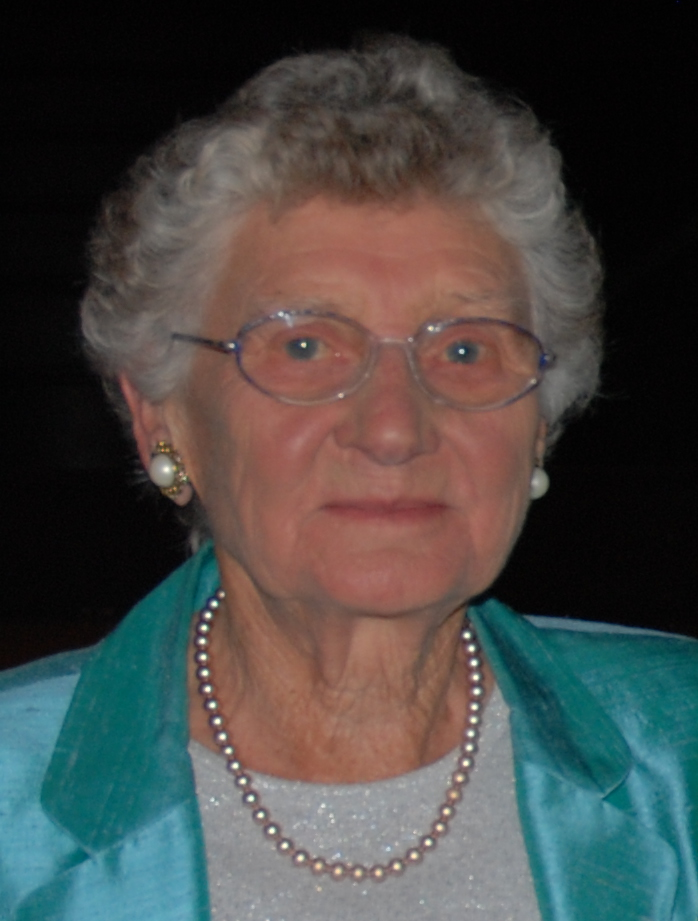
Helen Hughes

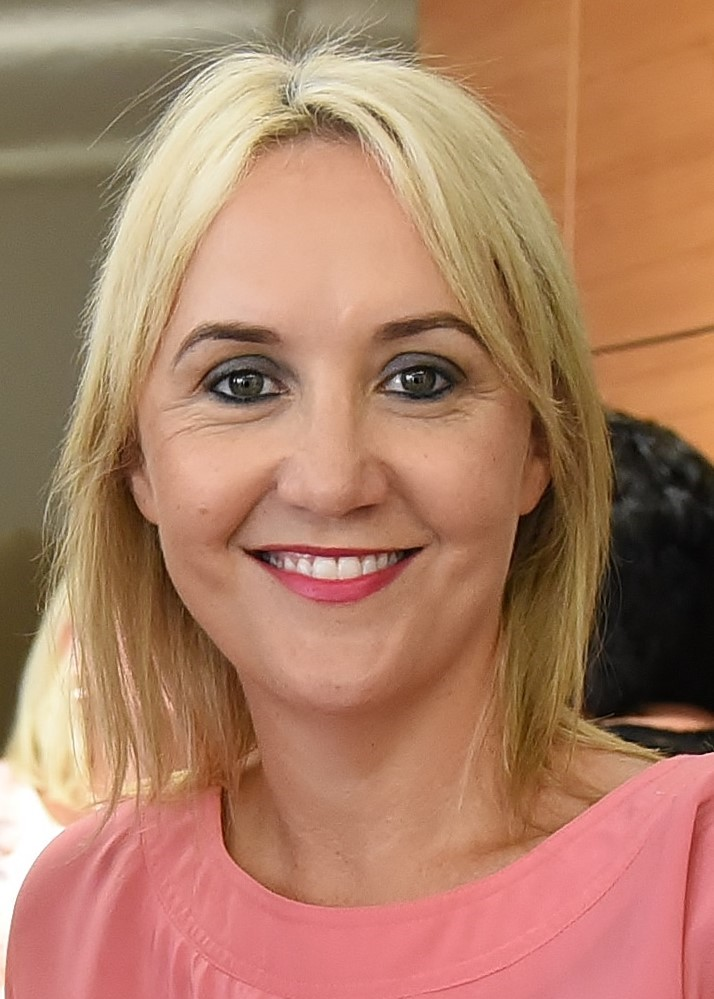
Nikki Kaye

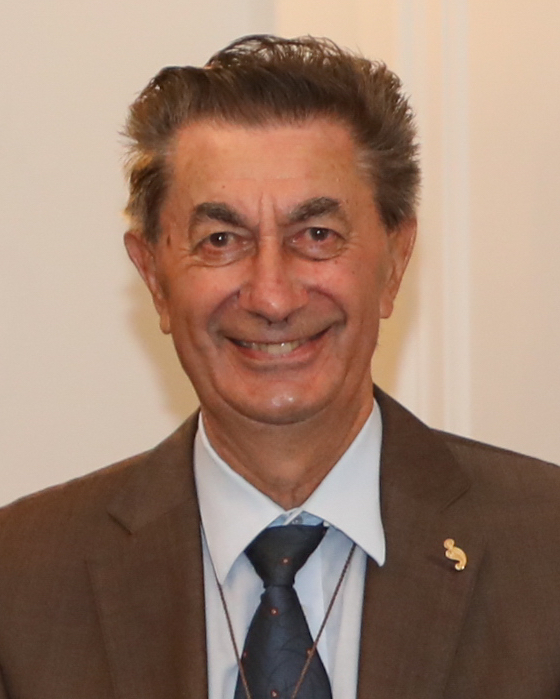
Angus Macfarlane

=== December ===
- 3 December – Jon McLachlan, rugby union player (Auckland, national team) (born 1949).
- 5 December – Peter Tracy, Commonwealth Games pole vaulter (1974), national high jump (1973) and pole vault champion (1974) (born 1955).
- 8 December
  - Michael Gill. cricketer (Central Districts) (born 1957).
  - Robert Smith, cricketer (Wellington) and cricket administrator (born 1946).
- 12 December – David Weatherley, actor (The Lord of the Rings: The Fellowship of the Ring, Power Rangers Operation Overdrive, Under the Mountain) (born 1939).
- 13 December
  - Luke Crawford, police officer and Māori cultural advisor (Māori All Blacks, New Zealand Rugby) (born 1961).
  - Roy Walker, theatre administrator (Mercury Theatre, Fortune Theatre) (born 1924).
- 17 December – Mark Braunias, artist, Wallace Art Awards paramount award (1992) (born 1955).
- 18 December – Martin Lodge, composer and musicologist (University of Waikato) (born 1954).
- 20 December
  - Ann Hartley, politician, MP for Northcote (1999–2005), Labour list MP (2005–2008), Mayor of North Shore City (1989–1992) (born 1942).
  - Ola Höglund, glass artist (born 1956).
- 27 December – Ann Wylie, botanist (University of Otago) (born 1922).
- 29 December – Bob McNeil, broadcast journalist (1ZH, 1ZB, TV3) (born 1942).
- 31 December – Wally Hirsh, educator (Mount Cook School, Karori West Normal School, Auckland University of Technology) Jewish community leader, and public servant, chair of the New Zealand Jewish Council (1980–1985), Race Relations Conciliator (1986–1989) (born 1936).
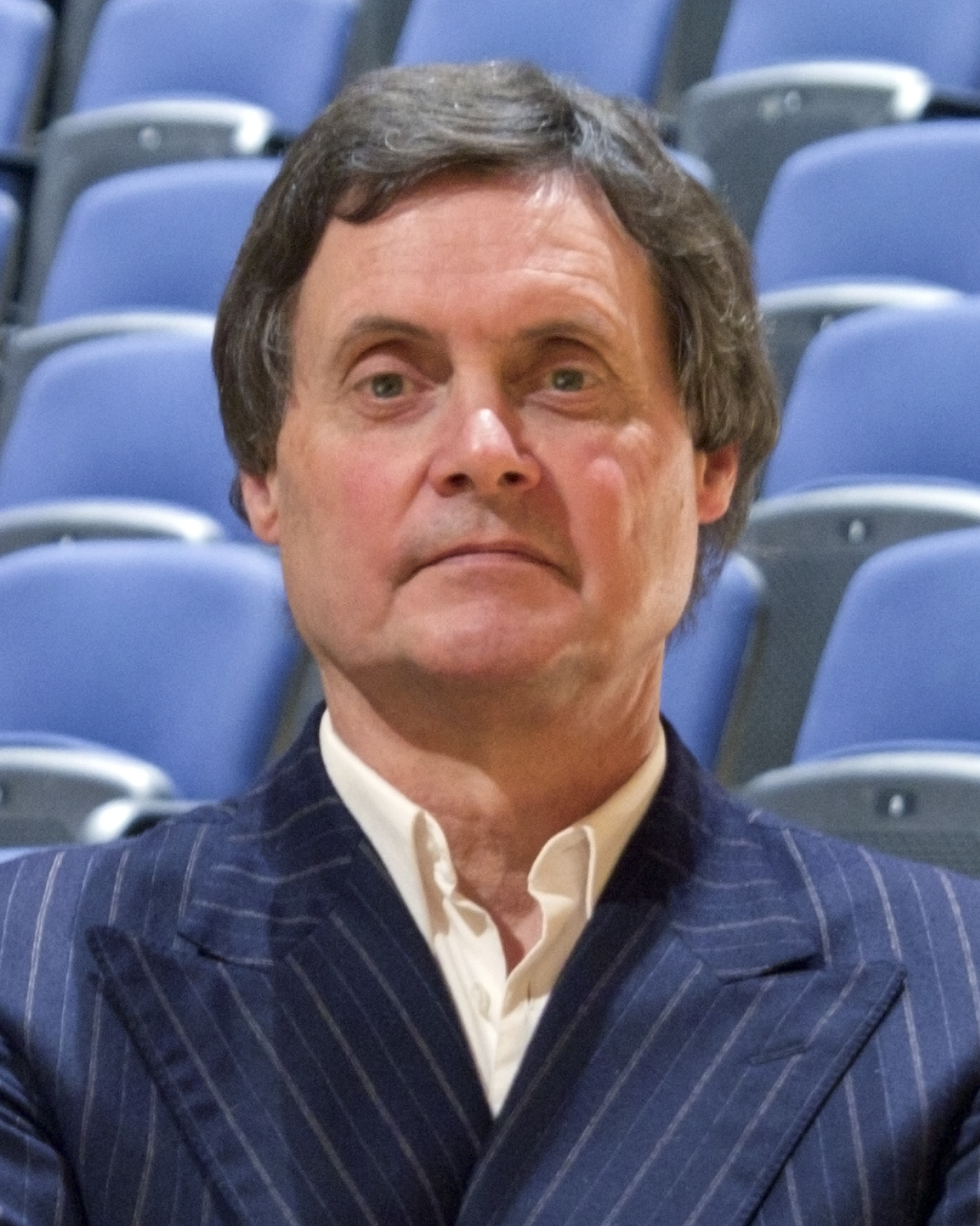
Martin Lodge

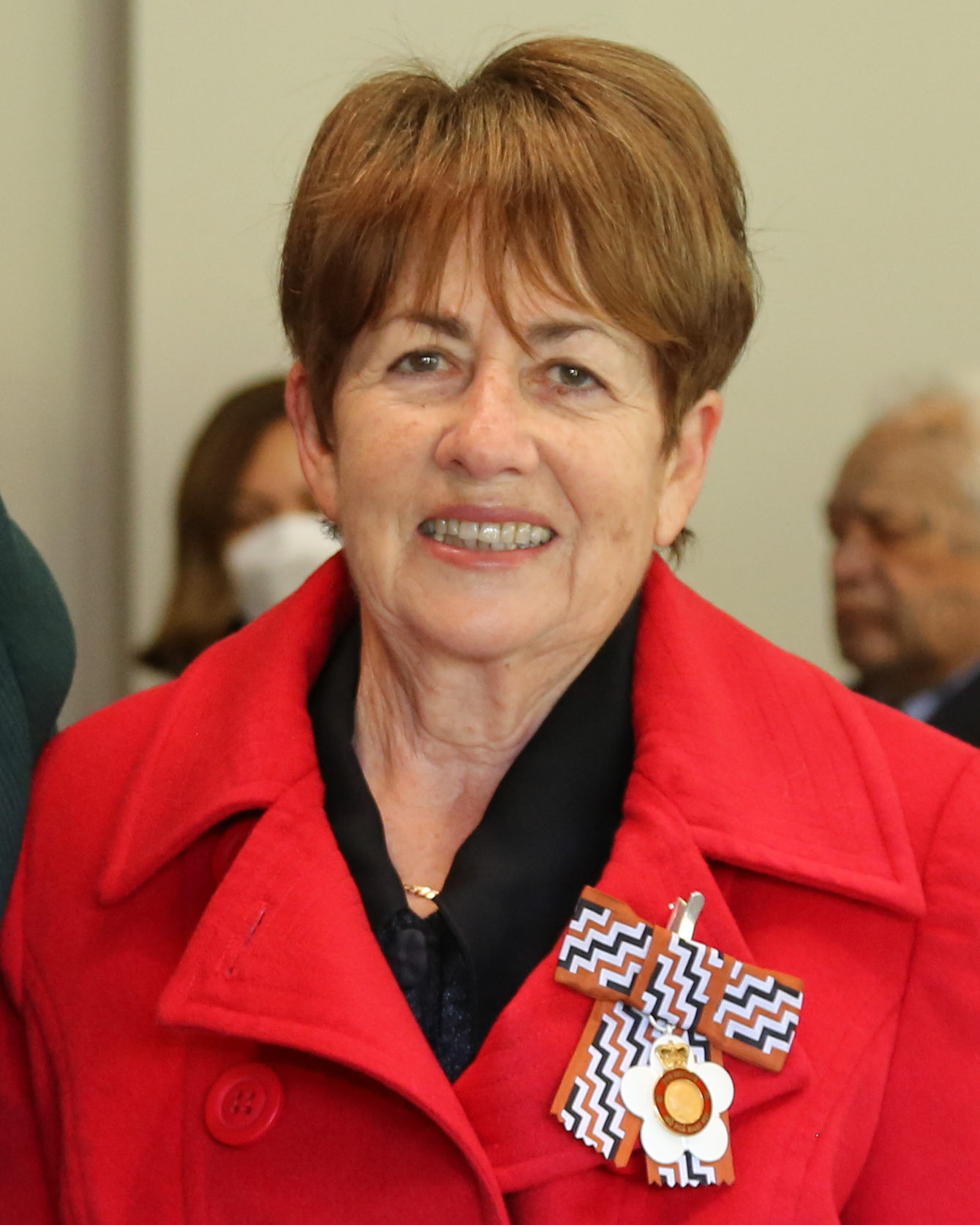
Ann Hartley
