= Death of Tūheitia =

2024 death of the Māori King

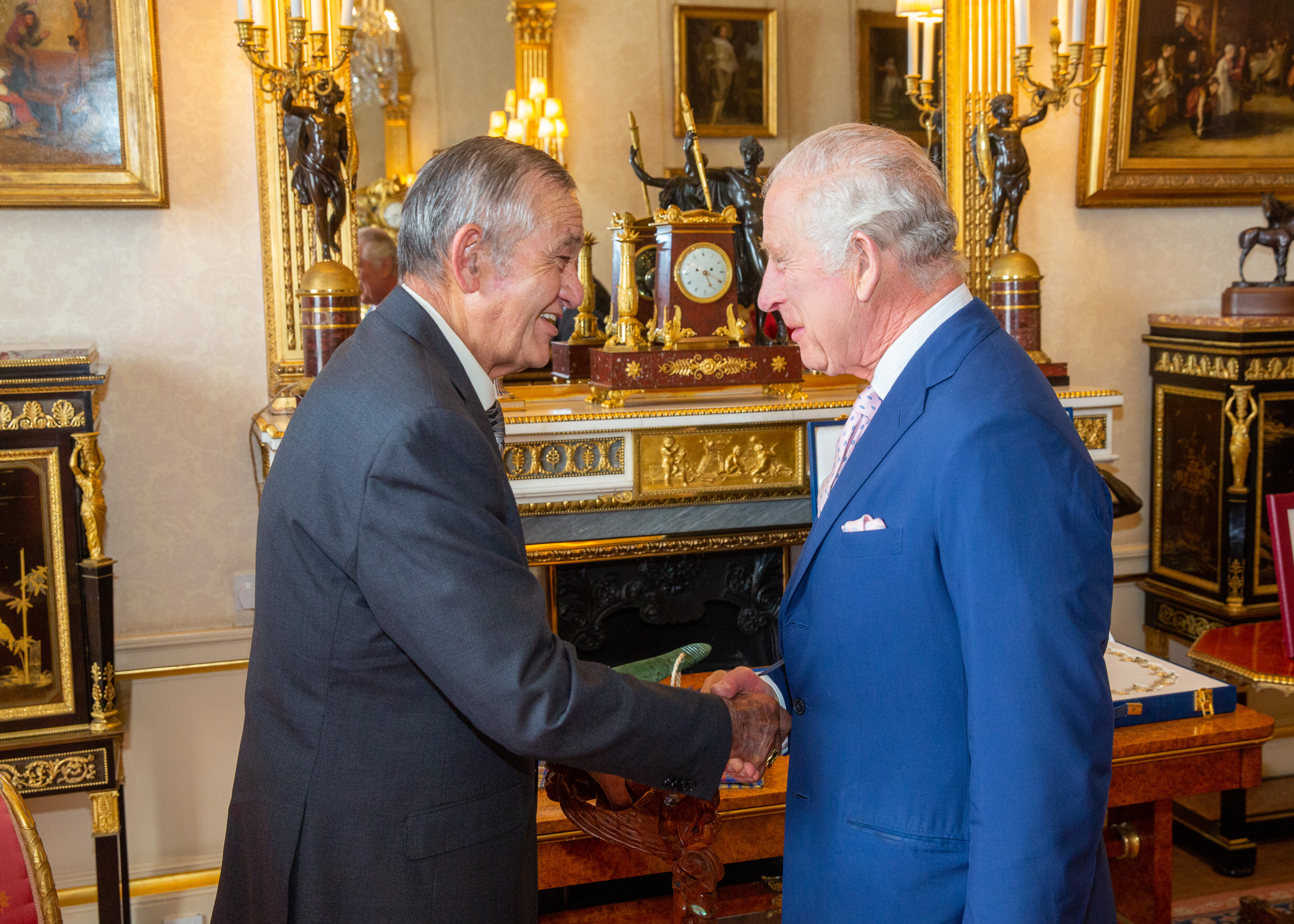
- Tūheitia with Charles III in London in 2023, the year before his death
- Date: 30 August 2024 (death); 5 September 2024 (burial)
- Venue: Tūrangawaewae marae (lying-in-state and funeral); Taupiri mountain (burial ceremony)
- Location: Ngāruawāhia (funeral); Taupiri (burial)

Tūheitia, the Māori King and leader of the Kīngitanga, died on 30 August 2024 at the age of 69. The King had been recovering in hospital from an unsuccessful cardiac surgery. His death came less than two weeks after hosting his eighteenth koroneihana, the annual celebration of his coronation. As the Māori monarchy is not hereditary by right, leaders of tribes associated with the Kīngitanga gathered to elect Tūheitia's successor during his tangihanga (funeral rites), which lasted five days. Tūheitia was succeeded by his daughter, Nga wai hono i te po, who was raised to the throne on the final day of his tangi.

== Background and death ==
The death of Kiingi Tūheitia is a moment of great sadness for followers of Te Kiingitanga, Maaoridom and the entire nation.

He kura kua ngaro ki tua o Rangi-whakamoe-ariki. Moe mai raa.
(A chief who has passed to the great beyond. Rest in love.)

— The office of the Kiingitanga

Tūheitia had suffered from poor health for many years. At his eighth koroneihana in August 2014, he revealed he had been suffering from diabetes and cancer for much of 2013. As he was obese, he had undergone weight loss surgery in response. Although Kīngitanga spokesman Tukoroirangi Morgan had said the King was in good spirits and would attend the 2014 koroneihana, he cautioned that recovery "was never going to be a short-term thing". In his absence, Tūheitia's son Whatumoana acted as regent.

Later in 2014 Tūheitia suffered a heart attack and spent weeks in Waikato Hospital recovering. In December 2016, he received a kidney transplant from his youngest son, Korotangi.

The King died on the morning of Friday, 30 August 2024, according to a statement released by the office of the Kīngitanga early on Friday morning. According to the Australian Associated Press, the statement read "Kiingi Tuheitia Pootatau Te Wherowhero VII has died peacefully ... accompanied by his wife [Te Atawhai] and their children Whatumoana, Korotangi and Ngawai Hono I Te Po [sic]". Kīngitanga chief of staff Ngira Simmonds confirmed a prior heart surgery had been unsuccessful, saying "It didn't quite go as we had all hoped".

To mark his death, the New Zealand government ordered flags to be flown at half-mast on all government and public buildings with immediate effect.

== Tangihanga ==
The king's body lay in state at Tūrangawaewae marae, the seat of the Kīngitanga, in Ngāruawāhia in the Waikato. His tangihanga lasted for five days, from Saturday 31 August 2024 until Thursday 5 September.

Plans for the tangihanga were released by the Kīngitanga late on Friday 30 August.

=== Saturday, 31 August ===
Māori attendees of the diverse Tainui confederation were the first to arrive at Tūrangawaewae. A pōwhiri for nearly 1,000 members began that morning at 8am, with karanga led by women from both manuhiri (guests) and mana whenua. As per Waikato Tainui tikanga, most were dressed in black, and women leading karanga donned pare kawakawa, a mourning headdress made from Piper excelsium leaves. Wearing black is a Victorian tradition that was widely adopted by Māori in the 19th century, as are the use of photographs.

The Prime Minister, Christopher Luxon, had given a press conference from Tonga the previous day, where he had been attending the Pacific Islands Forum, and announced he would travel to Ngāruawāhia to attend.

A government delegation led by Prime Minister Luxon and Māori Development Minister Tama Potaka then visited the marae. Luxon subsequently departed for a pre-planned work trip to Malaysia and South Korea on 1 September 2024. Luxon and Potaka were accompanied by senior politicians and officials including former Prime Minister Jenny Shipley, former Deputy Prime Minister Don McKinnon, and former Governor-General Silvia Cartwright.

=== Sunday, 1 September ===
On 1 September 2024, a number of notable dignitaries arrived at 8am, and were again welcomed by pōwhiri. Guests included Governor-General Dame Cindy Kiro. There were also representatives from the Rātana Church, and the iwi of Ngāti Tūwharetoa, Te Arawa, Ngāti Toa, Ngāti Raukawa, Ngāti Kauwhata and Ngāti Hine. Te Haahi Rātana Brass Band performed on behalf of the Rātana Church. Notable speakers included Meng Foon, the Māori-speaking Chinese New Zealander who had been mayor of Gisborne and the race relations conciliator.

=== Wednesday, 4 September ===
On 4 September 2024, a political pōwhiri was held as part of the tangi. Deputy Prime Minister Winston Peters led the government delegation consisting of Members of Parliament (MPs) from the National, ACT and New Zealand First parties including Speaker Gerry Brownlee, National deputy leader Nicola Willis, ACT leader David Seymour, MPs Nicole McKee, Karen Chhour, Shane Reti, Paul Goldsmith, Shane Jones and Casey Costello. In addition, MPs from the opposition Labour and Green parties including Labour leader Chris Hipkins, Labour Māori caucus co-leader Willie Jackson, Peeni Henare, Greens co-leader Chlöe Swarbrick and Green MP Teanau Tuiono attended the Wednesday tangi. Te Pāti Māori MPs participated in the tangi as members of their own iwi (tribes) and did not take part in the Wednesday pōwhiri.

=== Thursday, 5 September ===
5 September 2024 was the final day of the tangi. Tūheitia's daughter and youngest child, Nga wai hono i te po, was announced as the new monarch by leaders of tribes associated with the Kīngitanga, including the Tekau-mā-rua ("Twelve"), a council of senior Kīngitanga advisers from across the country. She was subsequently acclaimed as Queen by the process of Te Whakawahinga. Using the original 1858 Bible of Pōtatau Te Wherowhero, Archbishop Don Tamihere used sacred oils to bestow "prestige, sacredness, power and spiritual essence" upon the new Queen in the presence of her father's remains.

After the enthronement ceremony, Tūheitia's body was carried by pallbearers to his hearse, where a procession began down to the banks of the Waikato River, with crowds of mourners in attendance. A guard of honour from Ngāti Mahuta and the New Zealand Defence Force guarded the casket and guided it to the banks. His body was placed onto the waka Tātahi Ora.

The waka, also bearing the new queen, travelled 10 kilometres down the river to Mount Taupiri, where Māori monarchs are buried in unmarked graves as a sign of equality among their people. A train was hired to take mourners from Tūrangawaewae to the burial grounds. The waka journey took two hours. His casket was carried up 300 steps to the site of the grave by members of the Taniwharau and Tūrangawaewae Rugby League Clubs, with traditional ropes supporting them by Raungaiti Rugby Club. A small private service was then conducted at the grave.

== Reactions ==
=== Leaders ===
Official statements were made by the King of New Zealand, Charles III, Governor-General Dame Cindy Kiro, Prime Minister Christopher Luxon, all acknowledging Tūheitia's passing, and his character and service. Similar statements in his honour were put out to social media by former prime ministers, Chris Hipkins, Jacinda Ardern and Helen Clark.

Governor-General Kiro said in a bilingual statement: "The thunder crashes, the lightning flashes, it illuminates the heavens, and hammers downward. The land is forever shaking. The sadness within is palpable at the hearing of your passing." She said "his loss will be felt across Māoridom and the wider Pacific." She extended condolences to Tūheitia's wife Te Atawhai, and their three children, Whatumoana, Korotangi and Nga wai hono i te po.

Around the Pacific, leaders made statements and spoke condolences, including from Prime Minister of the Cook Islands Mark Brown, Prime Minister of Fiji Sitiveni Rabuka, Prime Minister of Tonga Siaosi Sovaleni, Governor of Hawaii Josh Green and Secretary General of the Pacific Islands Forum and former President of Nauru Baron Waqa.

The New Zealand Olympic Committee released a statement extending condolences, noting the special relationship the committee had formed with the kiingitanga.

Mayor of Kaipara Craig Jepson attracted controversy for refusing to hold a moment of silence to mark the passing of Māori King Tūheitia. Councillor Pera Paniora described Jepson's actions as disrespectful towards Māori.

At the next sitting of the New Zealand House of Representatives on 11 September 2024, the sole business was to pay to tribute to the King and then adjourn for the day.

=== Media commentary ===
After his death, Joseph Los'e, writing for The New Zealand Herald, compared Tūheitia favourably to Louis XVI of France and George Washington as a leader who "committed [himself] to a greater cause".

After Tūheitia's death, media attention reported that the King's public profile had increased after the 2024 hui-ā-motu he held at the official royal residence of Tūrangawaewae marae, in response to the election of the Sixth National Government and their policies towards Māori. Tūheitia, who had previously involved himself in partisan politics on several occasions, issued a royal proclamation in December 2023 to hold the hui that January. On 10 January 2024, Tūheitia's Waikato-Tainui iwi had filed a legal challenge at the Wellington High Court against the Government's plans to limit the usage of the Māori language in the public sector, claiming that it breached the Crown's 1995 raupatu treaty settlement with them. The national hui was held on 20 January 2024. After his death, The Spinoff said "it was in the past year, during the outrage from Māoridom over the government's Māori-related policies, that Tuheitia really stepped to the fore, taking on the leadership mantle".

Tūheitia had been a truck driver before becoming king, which was widely reported, and mentioned by politicians (namely Shane Jones) after his death. He had also worked as a cultural adviser to Te Wānanga o Aotearoa.
