= Koroneihana 2025 =

Annual celebration of the Māori Monarch

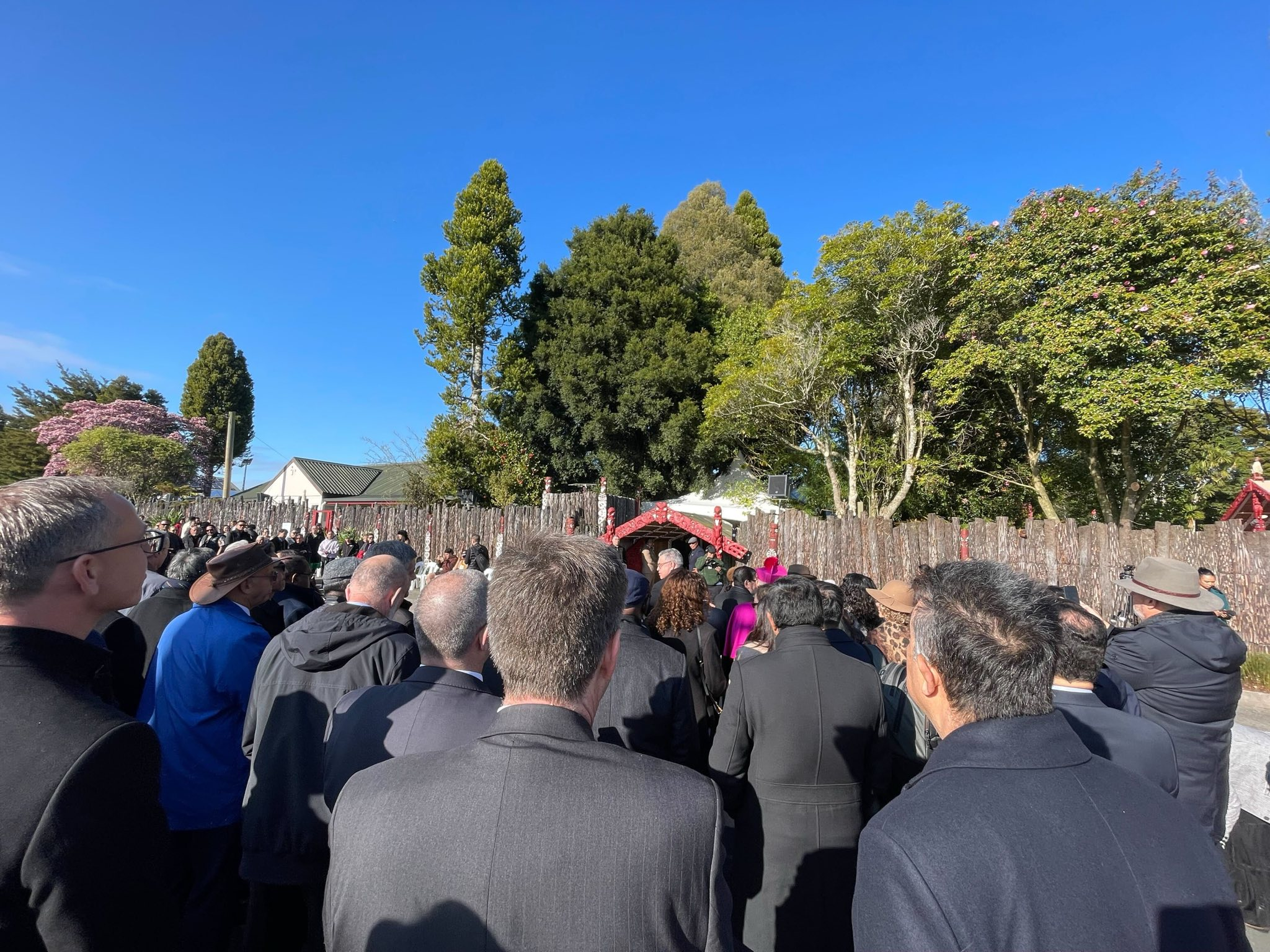
- Crowds gather outside the marae
- Date: September 2–6, 2025
- Venue: Turangawaewae Marae
- Location: Ngaruawahia, New Zealand
- Organized by: Kīngitanga
- Monarch: Nga wai hono i te po
- Previous: Koroneihana 2024

Koroneihana 2025 was the first annual koroneihana (coronation celebration) of Māori Queen Nga wai hono i te po's reign. It was held from 2 to 6 September 2025. It saw the new queen's first public speech since her assumption of the role.

== Background ==
Māori Queen Nga wai hono i te po in 2026

Every year, the Kīngitanga movement hosts a celebration of its monarch's coronation in which thousands of people gather from across the country, the Pacific, and elsewhere. The event is hosted at the Tūrangawaewae Marae complex in Ngaruawahia, the royal residence and headquarters of the movement, located along the banks of the Waikato River. Koroneihana are regarded as one of the more important events on the annual Māori political calendar. Pōwhiri, whaikōrero, karakia, and waiata are common ceremonial aspects of the celebrations.

The 2025 celebration was the first since the death of the previous king Tūheitia, the first in honor of his daughter, Nga wai hono i te po. A one-year period of mourning occurs after the death of a Māori monarch; the 2025 koroneihana marked the end of that period.

== Attendees ==
Members of the Te Wherowhero royal family were in attendance, including the new queen's brother and mother. Several Pacific royals and nobles were also in attendance, including Tongan Crown Prince Tupoutoʻa ʻUlukalalam, House of Ariki President Tou Travel Ariki, and Hawaiian Princes Quentin and Riley Kawānanakoa. Government and political party leaders from the Pacific also attended. Politicians from Labour, the Greens, and Te Pāti Māori were in attendance; Prime Minister Christopher Luxon did not attend.

== Proceedings ==
=== 2–3 September ===
The first two days were set aside as days of remembrance for deceased loved ones, as is the custom. The first day's pōwhiri saw a crowd of thousands as people grieved the deceased of Tainui waka. Kapa haka groups from Tainui waka performed in the afternoon.

The Rātana band lead iwi groups into the marae in the morning of the 2nd day; a pōwhiri for those gathered followed. Relatives of the late Tariana Turei were in attendance for the day of mourning; the same was true for the late Iritana Tawhiwhirangi and the late Bom Gillies. The pōwhiri ended at 1:35pm after 4.5 hours. Kapa haka groups from Northland performed to large crowds during the celebrations.

Several Te Pāti Māori members of Parliament attended as members of their whanau and iwi, namely Rawiri Waititi, Debbie Ngarewa-Packer, Hana-Rawhiti Maipi-Clarke, and Mariameno Kapa-Kingi. Green MP Hūhana Lyndon also attended in a similar manner.

=== 4 September ===
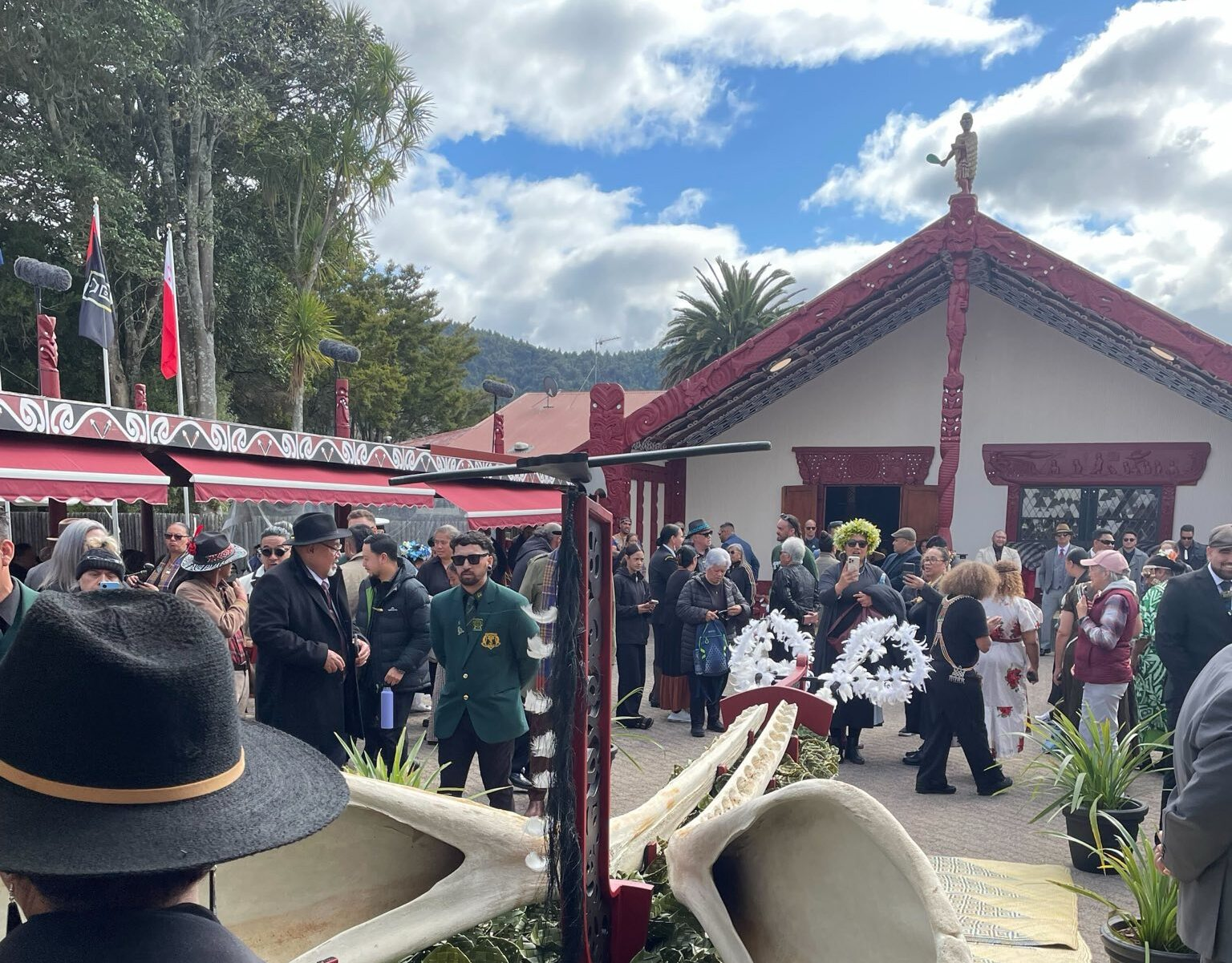
Crowds gathered in the ātea of the marae.

Delegations from the Pacific nations of Tonga, the Cook Islands, Tahiti, Hawai'i and Fiji were greeted by pōwhiri on the 3rd day.

Te Ara Maurei, a sperm whale jawbone, was gifted to the Queen. It was originally planned as a gift from the eight iwi of Te Tauihu to the previous female Māori monarch, Te Atairangikaahu. The jawbone had been held in Nelson in preparation to be handed over at the koroneihana. Te Pāti Māori MP Tākuta Ferris accompanied the iwi.

Delegations from the Green and Labour parties arrived on this day, including Labour leader Chris Hipkins and Green co-leaders Chlöe Swarbrick and Marama Davidson.

=== 5 September ===
5 September marked the official one year anniversary of Nga wai hono i te po's coronation. The day opened with karakia from various religious authorities and speeches from iwi leaders. A ceremony for the transfer of the mauri of Te Matatini occurred across the road from the marae, at Paterson Park. Waikato-Tainui iwi will host the 2027 contest at Hōpuhōpū.

==== Queen's maiden speech ====
External video
- Māori Queen gives first national address – Radio New Zealand (in Māori)

The new queen had planned to deliver her first speech at 12:30pm; it began at 1pm instead.

She acknowledged the legacy of those that held the position before her, especially her father, and the heavy responsibility that came with the role. She called for unity and collective responsibility amongst iwi. The Queen announced a new fund for the benefit of Māori, Tahua Kotahitanga, pointing towards government cuts towards Māori initiatives as reason it was necessary. The Queen ended her speech with a poi performance and a haka.

The reaction to the speech was overwhelmingly positive from those in attendance; one woman described it as "amazing" and as a "promise for the future", another saying the speech was real and relatable through its expression of sorrow for the death of the Queen's father. One kaumātua ('elder') described it as "beautiful" and said his head was "flowing with joy". A woman who had attended koroneihana for almost 30 years described the Queen as having the mana for the role, saying she was a "good role model" for young Māori. The idea that the Queen represented the future and was a role model for young Māori was common amongst reactions.

=== 6 September ===
An outdoor concert closed out the celebrations.
