= Elective monarchy =

Monarchy ruled by an elected ruler

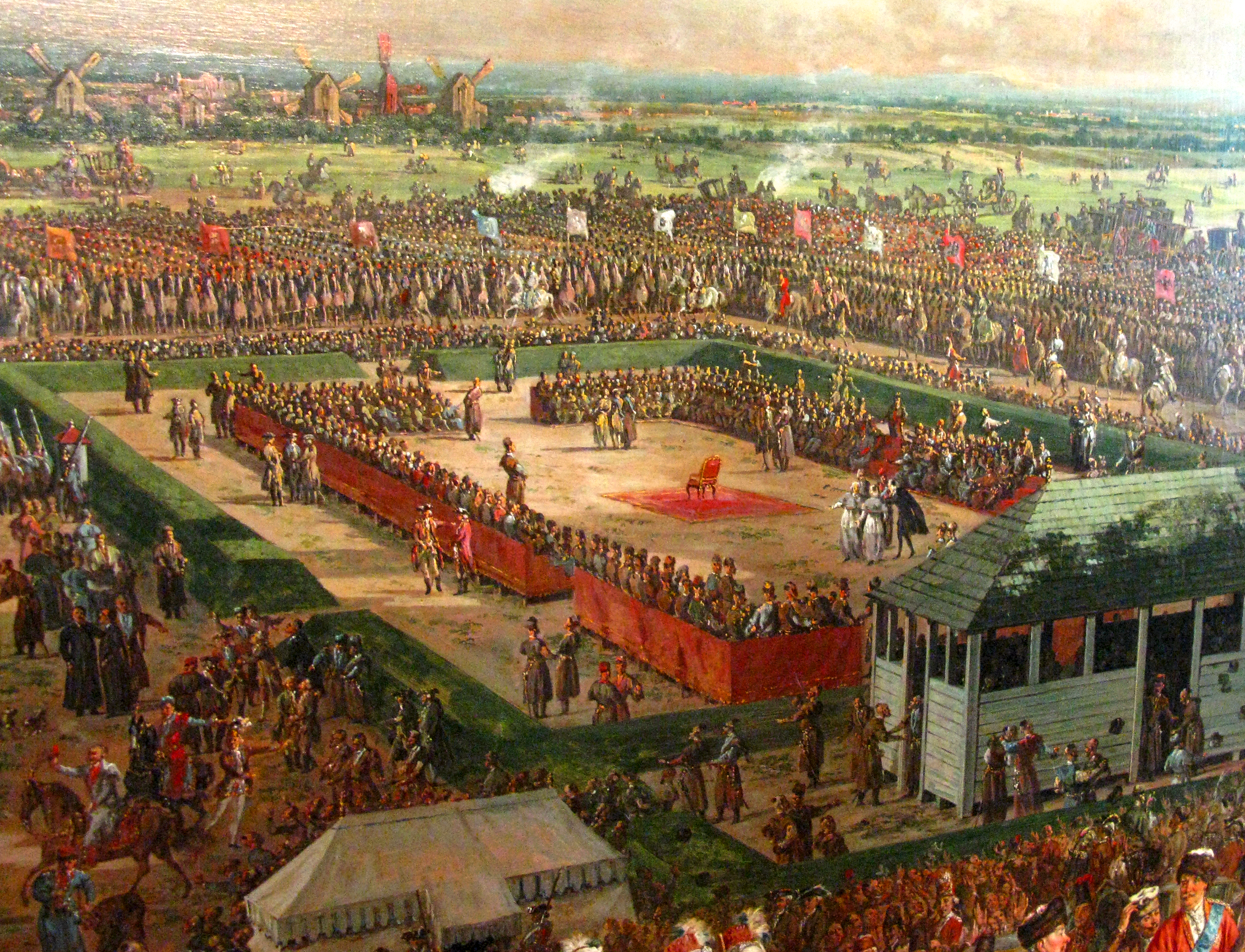
The 1764 Polish royal election

An elective monarchy is a monarchy where the ruling head is elected instead of strictly inheriting power. The manner of election, the nature of candidate qualifications, and the electors vary from case to case. Historically, it was common for elective monarchies to transform into hereditary ones (whether legally or de facto) by repeated election of the previous rulers' children, or for hereditary monarchies to acquire elective or semi-elective succession laws, particularly following dynastic crises.

== Evolution ==
Most elected monarchies practiced hereditary succession, guaranteeing that the title and office stayed within the royal family and specifying, more or less precisely, the order of succession. Many monarchies, to avoid a succession crisis, elected the next monarch when the previous one died and left no heir.

== Historical examples ==
=== Europe ===
==== Ancient Greece ====
The kings of Macedon and of Epirus were elected by the army, which was similar in composition to the Ecclesia of the Demos, the assembly of all free Athenian citizens.

==== Ancient Rome and Byzantium ====
In the ancient Roman Kingdom the kings were elected by the Roman assemblies. When a king died, the senate would appoint an interrex to oversee the election for a new king. Whilst given many titles (including "Augustus", i.e. "majestic") Octavian described himself as princeps senatus, or merely "first among senators". Thus he portrayed an illusion of being elected by and from the Senate.

==== England ====
A system of elective monarchy existed in Anglo-Saxon England (see Witenagemot).

John, King of England was chosen as King of England by a council of nobles and royal advisors at the death of his brother, Richard I, in 1199 because the heir by strict primogeniture, Arthur of Brittany, was a child at that time.

In 14th, 15th, late 17th and early 18th century England, the evolving relations between the Crown and Parliament resulted in a monarchy with both hereditary and quasi-elective elements – at least as between various contenders with some dynastic claim for the throne. Henry IV of England was chosen by Parliament in 1399 to replace Richard II. Richard was childless, and the Earl of March, the next in line to the throne, was a young child at the time, so Parliament bypassed him in favour of Henry, who had led a revolt against Richard. Parliament also confirmed depositions during the Wars of the Roses, as well as Henry VIII's settlements of the crown. During the Exclusion Crisis, King Charles II strongly opposed any such idea.

Following the Glorious Revolution, a Convention Parliament enacted the Bill of Rights 1689, which chose William III and Mary II to replace James II. (Mary was James's elder daughter, and William was his nephew.) They were succeeded by Mary's younger sister Anne, and the parliament of England enacted the Act of Settlement 1701.

==== Scotland ====
In Scotland, the Declaration of Arbroath of 1320 asserted the rights of the nobles to choose a king if required, which implied elective monarchy. Tanistry was also the system of royal succession until King Malcolm II in the early 11th century introduced direct inheritance. The Isle of Man also used tanistry.

==== Great Britain ====
By the Acts of Union of 1707, England and Wales and Scotland were united into a single kingdom called Great Britain. Therafter, the parliament of this new state regulated the succession to its throne, enacting the Succession to the Crown Act 1707, confirming the disinheritance of the Stuarts in favour of the House of Hanover, whose dynastic claim was far more remote. "Papists" (Roman Catholics), who included the male descendants of James II, were explicitly excluded from the order of succession.

The Succession to the Crown Act 2013 replaced male-preference primogeniture with absolute primogeniture and also ended the disqualification of a person who married a Roman Catholic from the succession. This confirmed the view of parliament that such decisions were entirely a matter for elected politicians to decide, although there had been an agreement with the other Commonwealth realms.

==== Ireland ====
In Ireland, from the beginning of recorded history until the mid-16th/early 17th century, succession was determined by an elective system based on patrilineal relationship known as tanistry.

==== Gaul/France ====
The Gallic tribes were each ruled by a rix, which can be translated as king, who were elected for terms of one year or longer. Candidates were drawn from relatives of past kings.

The Frankish kingdom was at least partly elective. Merovingian kings were elected, while Carolingian kings were elected at times. In the 10th century Western Frankish royal elections switched between different lineages before settling on the Capetians. Medieval France was an elective monarchy at the time of the first Capetian kings; the kings however took the habit of, during their reign, having their son elected as co-king and successor during their reigns. The election soon became a mere formality and vanished after the reign of Philip II.

After declaring the throne vacant, the French Chamber of Deputies voted 229–33 to declare Louis-Philippe of France as King of the French during the July Revolution of 1830, creating an elective monarchy. France briefly had again a kind of elective monarchy when Napoleon III was first elected President of France and then transformed himself into an Emperor.

==== Holy Roman Empire ====
The Holy Roman Empire, beginning with its predecessor Eastern Francia, is perhaps the best-known example of an elective monarchy. However, from 1440 to 1740, a Habsburg was always elected emperor, the throne becoming unofficially hereditary. During that period, the emperor was elected from within the House of Habsburg by a small council of nobles called prince-electors. The secular electoral seats were hereditary. However, spiritual electors (and other prince-(arch)bishops) were usually elected by the cathedral chapters as religious leaders, but simultaneously ruled as monarch (prince) of a territory of imperial immediacy.

==== Bohemia ====
Since medieval times, the King of Bohemia was elected by the Estates of the Lands of the Bohemian Crown. Since 1526, when Ferdinand I assumed the Bohemian Crown, it was always held by the Habsburg branch who later became Holy Roman Emperor and who expected this situation to go on indefinitely. In 1618, the Bohemians chose to exercise in practice their legal right to choose a King at their discretion, despite having already elected Ferdinand II as king, and bestowed the Bohemian Crown on Frederick V, Elector Palatine – "The Winter King". However, the Habsburgs regarded this as an act of rebellion, re-imposed their rule over Bohemia in the Battle of the White Mountain, and in the aftermath abolished the Bohemian Elective Monarchy and made exclusive Habsburg rule the de jure as well as de facto situation.

==== Hungary ====
Hungary was an elective monarchy until 1687. This elective right carried on for another two more decades in the Principality of Transylvania which de jure continued to belong to the Lands of the Hungarian Crown but had split from Hungary when the childless King Louis II died after the Battle of Mohács.

==== Iberia ====
Visigothic Hispania elected the king from the relatives of past kings, in accordance with the Germanic traditions. In practice, the Visigoth kings appointed their eldest sons to manage the kingdom's affairs, so that when the king died the eldest son was politically skilled enough to secure the throne. In the 5th century, hereditary succession was increasingly stable until the Frankish invasions against the Visigoths led to a period of crisis in which the Visigoths reverted to elections. After the crisis was over in the 6th century, the family of Leovigild attempted to revive hereditary succession until Swintila was overthrown and the Fourth Council of Toledo formally declared elective succession as the principle of succession in 633.

The Kingship of Aragon was initially elected by the "rich men" barons. Later this right was limited to the Cortes confirming the succession of the heir.

==== Crown of the Kingdom of Poland ====
After Jadwiga Anjou inherited the throne of Kingdom of Poland in 1384, nobles elected Jogaila of Lithuania to be her husband and co-king in 1386. As the Queen was hereditary monarch, it was expected the royal pair's offspring will be the new heir; however, the succession line was broken when Jadwiga and her only daughter, Princess Elizabeth, both died in 1399. While Polish noblemen continued to recognize Jogaila as the King (under the name of Ladislaus II), his children by next wives were not automatically viewed as heirs, though he ultimately managed to secure their election as future rulers of Poland. His descendants in male line were being chosen to reign over the kingdom until the death Sigismund II Augustus in 1572 (and again in female line from 1575 to 1668 during Polish–Lithuanian Commonwealth [see below]). Nobles were supportive of continuation of dynasty, however, they wished to have control over who ascends the throne, believing it would lead to the royal children being raised as more competent than in case they would inherit automatically. This politics continued into time when Crown of the Kingdom of Poland was united with Grand Duchy of Lithuania, creating Polish–Lithuanian Commonwealth, where the ruling King's children were considered primary candidates as successors, but the throne remained elective.

==== Polish–Lithuanian Commonwealth ====
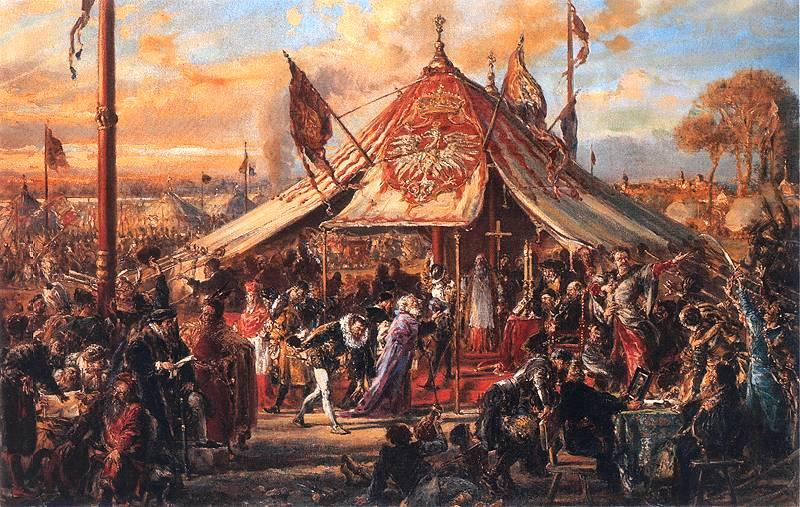
The Republic at the Zenith of Its Power. Golden Liberty. The Royal Election of 1573, by Jan Matejko

The tradition of electing the country's ruler, which occurred when there was no clear heir to the throne, dates to the very beginning of Polish statehood. The election privilege, exercised during the gatherings known as wiec, was usually limited to the most powerful nobles (magnates) or officials, and was heavily influenced by local traditions and strength of the ruler.

Although the elective principle was already established in Polish political culture in the late Middle Ages, the rules changed significantly in the 1570s, and the principles developed in that period lasted until the Partitions of Poland. There were thirteen royal elections in Poland–Lithuania from 1573 to 1764. Roșu (2017) marked the 1575/1576 Polish–Lithuanian royal election as the most significant for several reasons. First, 'the citizens of the commonwealth were forced to de facto depose their first elected king – thus applying the right of disobedience they had inscribed in their public records only two years before.' Second, it resulted in two candidates being proclaimed the winner, and in subsequent events the nobility was able to confirm their majority choice for Stephen Báthory and have it recognised, while avoiding war with Maximilian II of Habsburg.

==== Scandinavia ====
Scandinavian kingship, according to the Germanic tradition, was elected upon the death of the previous king. The selection was not always limited to the heirs of the previous king (e.g. in Sweden when the royal house was changing between the houses of Eric and Sverker between generations). Originally, kings were supposed to be elected from among the descendants of a previous king, which was connected to descent from gods. There could also be joint rule between multiple kings. Disputed succession was common because of a large number of sons sired by kings. However, when single rule appeared in the 9th century, civil wars grew in frequency throughout the region. Later, Christianisation led to the promulgation of primogeniture in Norway in 1163 and Denmark in 1170, but the elective idea still persisted in the requirement to be certified by a local assembly and subsequently the magnates would still elect the new king, albeit while the incumbent king was still alive. This demonstrated the enduring power of the nobles.

==== Sovereign Military Order of Malta ====
The Sovereign Military Order of Malta, formerly known as the Knights Hospitaller or the Knights of Malta, remains a sovereign subject of international law since it was exiled to Rome from Malta during the French occupation of Malta under the French First Republic. The Order is ruled by the Prince and Grand Master, who is elected for life by the Council Complete of State. The Prince and Grand Master holds the rank of Prince, bestowed by the Holy Roman Emperor in 1607 and holds the precedence of a cardinal of the Church since 1630. The Council that elects the prince includes members of the Sovereign Council and other high-ranking office-holders and representatives of the Order's worldwide entities. The Sovereign Council, including the Grand Commander, the Grand Chancellor, the Grand Hospitaller, and the Receiver of the Common Treasure, aid the prince in governing the order.

=== Asia ===
==== Afghanistan ====
In Afghanistan, loya jirgas have been reportedly organized since at least the early 18th century when the Hotaki and Durrani dynasties rose to power.

==== Persia/Iran ====
The Parthian Empire (248 BC–224 AD), also known as the Arsacid Empire, is considered to be the first elective monarchy in Asia.

==== Mongol Empire ====
In the Mongol Empire, the Great Khan was chosen by the Kurultai. This was often convened in the capital. Other critical leadership positions were also assigned.

==== Korea ====
The ancient Korean kingdom of Silla elected its first king by a conference of tribal and village elders in 57 BC. Unified Silla's kings were elected by the aristocracy whose powers were on par with the king. In the kingdom of Goguryeo, the ruler was originally chosen from among the heads of the five tribes, most often the Sono tribe.

==== Siam/Thailand ====
There were several occasions that the Kingdom of Siam and Thailand turned to a semi-elective monarchy system to settle the succession of the crown among disputed heirs:

- In 1824, Phutthaloetla Naphalai died suddenly without having named a successor to viceroy Maha Senanurak, who had died 16 July 1817. According to the traditions of royal succession, the viceroy or uparaja was heir presumptive. If there were none, then an ad hoc senabodi consisting of senior officials present at the death of a king, would elect a successor. As a result of enormous support from senior and influential nobles, Chetsadabodin was elected as the successor.
- In 1867, as Mongkut had not designated who would succeed him, the choice fell to a council to decide. The council led by Prince Deves, Mongkut's eldest half-brother, then chose Chulalongkorn as Mongkut's successor. However, Chulalongkorn was only 15 and so the council choose Si Suriyawongse to become the regent until Chulalongkorn came of age.
- On 2 March 1935, Prince Ananda Mahidol was elected by the National Assembly and the Thai government to succeed his uncle, King Prajadhipok, as the eighth king of the Chakri dynasty, because Prajadhipok, the previous king, had not named an heir before his abdication.

=== Oceania ===
Several Māori tribes of the central North Island of New Zealand elected Pōtatau Te Wherowhero as their monarch in 1858. The Māori King movement or Kiingitanga has continued to the present. King Tuheitia's daughter and youngest child, Nga wai hono i te po, was announced by the Tekau-ma-Rua as the next monarch on 5 September 2024, the last day of his tangi. She is the second queen of the Kīngitanga, after her grandmother Te Arikinui Dame Te Atairangikaahu.

=== The Americas ===
==== United States ====
An attempt to create an elective monarchy in the United States failed. Alexander Hamilton argued in a long speech before the Constitutional Convention of 1787 that the President of the United States should be an elective monarch, ruling for "good behavior" (i.e., for life, unless impeached) and with extensive powers. Hamilton believed that elective monarchs had sufficient power domestically to resist foreign corruption, yet there was enough domestic control over their behavior to prevent tyranny at home. His proposal was resoundingly voted down in favor of a four-year term with the possibility of reelection.

==== Haiti ====
The crown of the Empire of Haiti, established in 1804, was also elective according to its 1805 constitution.

== Other elections ==
In 1971 seven individual Emirates in the Arabian Peninsula united to form the United Arab Emirates and became a federation. Upon its formation, Sheikh Zayed bin Sultan Al Nahyan of Abu Dhabi was elected as the head of the state and Ra'is (President) of the union by the ruling monarchs of the other six Emirates, while Zayed himself voted for Rashid bin Saeed Al Maktoum, then ruler of Dubai. Gopala, the first emperor of the Pala Empire, was chosen by independent regional warchiefs in the 8th century. This arrangement was common in many contemporary tribal societies in the region.

== Invitation ==
Historically, new polities or countries in internal turmoil sometimes selected and invited some person to become their monarch. For example, on 9 October 1918 the Parliament of newly independent Finland elected Prince Frederick Charles of Hesse, brother-in-law of the German Emperor Wilhelm II, as King of Finland – but soon afterwards, this move was foiled by the German defeat in World War I and the demise of monarchy in Germany itself, and Finland opted to become a republic instead.

According to Russian historiographic tradition, in 862, various East Slavic and Finnic tribes invited Rurik, a Varangian chief, to re-establish order; he is considered to be the traditional founder of the Russian monarchy and his descendants ruled Russia until 1598. In the Russian city-states of Pskov and Novgorod, various princes from neighboring principalities were invited to serve in their cities.

== Current elective monarchies ==
=== Cambodia ===
Article 13 of the Cambodian Constitution stipulates that the monarch is chosen for a life term by the 9-member Royal Council of the Throne, the composition of which includes the President of the Senate, the Speaker of the National Assembly, the Prime Minister, the two Patriarchs of the country's two main Buddhist Sangha Nikayas, the 1st and 2nd Deputy Presidents of the Senate and the 1st and 2nd Deputy Speakers of the National Assembly. Article 14 of the Constitution further states that the royal candidate for the throne must be at least 30 years old and a descendant of King Ang Duong, King Norodom or King Sisowath.

=== Holy See ===
In the Holy See and the associated Vatican City State, the Pope is elected for life in a conclave by the College of Cardinals, generally from among their number. The Cardinal or any other elected individual that obtains the necessary majority of two thirds needed to be elected Pope may decline which would mean the Conclave shall continue voting until another person gets the majority and accepts. The Pope may resign at any time after his election as long as the resignation is made "freely and properly manifested". The resignation does not need to be accepted by any other entity or individual and takes effect immediately.

=== Malaysia ===
The Yang di-Pertuan Agong (King) of Malaysia is elected to a five-year term. Nine hereditary rulers from the Malay States form a Conference of Rulers to determine the next king via secret ballot. The position has to date been de facto rotated amongst the state rulers, originally based on seniority. The Yang di-Pertuan Agong shall not be re-elected unless the rotation succession was complete.

- Additionally, the Malaysian state of Negeri Sembilan is itself an elective monarchy, where the Yang di-Pertuan Besar of Negeri Sembilan is selected by a council of ruling chiefs. The ruling chiefs themselves are elected by the chieftain. Male candidates are determined based on matrilineal clan due to the influence of Minangkabau culture. The system was partially the basis for the federal monarchy.
- The Sultan of Perak is selected from amongst the most senior male princes descending from the 18th Sultan of Perak, Sultan Ahmadin. The Sultan, Raja Muda (Crown Prince), and Raja Di-Hilir (Deputy Crown Prince) are selected by the Dewan Negara of Perak. A son of the reigning Sultan cannot become Raja Muda if there is a more senior prince descended from the previous Sultan; this is possible should the senior prince relinquish his right to become Raja Muda.

=== United Arab Emirates ===
The president is elected by the Federal Supreme Council with a term of five years. Since its formation, the position has been a de facto hereditary position to the Al Nahyan sheikhs of Abu Dhabi by consensus of the Federal Supreme Council. Likewise, the Al Maktoum sheikhs of Dubai hold a vice presidential position and the role of prime minister. Elections are held every 5 years. The position of the ruler of each emirate of the United Arab Emirates is determined by consensus of the respective ruling royal family of that emirate.

=== Similar forms ===
- Andorra can be considered a semi-elective principality, with the unique feature that one of its two co-monarchs is democratically elected by the people of a different country, namely France. The two co-princes of Andorra are the Bishop of La Seu d'Urgell, who resides in Spain and is appointed by the Pope, and the President of France. The President's role derives from the original medieval co-rule arrangement, which stemmed from a treaty between the Bishop and the Count of Foix; the Count's role was later inherited by the King of Navarre and then by the King of France, finally devolving on the President once France became a republic.
- The cacique of the Ngöbe people of Costa Rica and Panama is appointed for life by a council of 13 elders. The latest election was in 2013 after the death of the previous cacique at around 100 years old. The current cacique is Costa Rican-born Pedro Palacios, son of the previous cacique Pedro Bejarano.
- While Samoa has been a parliamentary republic since independence in 1962, it was commonly mistaken for an elective monarchy for most of its existence. The Constitution of Samoa provides that the O le Ao o le Malo, the Samoan head of state, is elected for a five-year term by the Fono, the Samoan parliament. Articles 18 and 45 of the Constitution provide, respectively, that any citizen who is eligible for Parliament (and meets additional optional qualifications which are decided by Parliament) may be elected head of state, and that any Samoan citizen may be elected to Parliament, although 47 out of the 49 seats in the Fono are reserved for matai, or chiefs (the other two are reserved for non-Samoans). However, most of the confusion stemmed from a special clause which named Malietoa Tanumafili II and Tupua Tamasese Meaʻole, who were two of the four paramount chiefs (Tama-a-Aiga), as joint presidents for life, only reverting to the normal rule of electing the head of state for five years upon Malietoa's death in 2007. In addition, the Samoan head of state is referred to as "His Highness".
- Saudi Arabia's throne, while hereditary, is not determined by a succession law but rather by consensus of the House of Saud as to who will be Crown Prince of Saudi Arabia; consensus may change depending on the Crown Prince's actions or influence, creating strong incentive for the Crown Prince to assert his power. Since 2007, the process of establishing the consensus of the House has been institutionalized in the form of the Allegiance Council, comprising the most powerful senior princes, which has the power to disapprove the King's nominee for Crown Prince and substitute its own by simple majority vote.
- The Kiingitanga movement in New Zealand chooses a Māori monarch, elected by the Tekau-mā-rua, who are generally chiefs of various New Zealand iwi (tribes). However, every Māori monarch to date has been succeeded by a child. Notably, the current Māori monarch Nga wai hono i te po was chosen ahead of her 2 elder brothers, which was subject to some controversy in the Māori community.
- In Eswatini (formerly Swaziland), the Liqoqo, independent traditional council will select one wife of Ngwenyama after his death to be the "great wife" and Ndlovukati, the son of selected Ndlovukati will be made a new King by the council.

== See also ==
- Elective dictatorship
- President for life
- Autocracy
