= 2024 Kīngitanga election =

2024 election of the Māori Queen

- 3–5 September 2024
Nominee	Nga wai hono i te po
Monarch before election
Tūheitia †
Elected Monarch
Nga wai hono i te po

The election of the eighth Māori monarch took place from 3 to 5 September 2024, following the death of King Tūheitia. The Tekau-mā-rua (Tūheitia's privy council) convened a meeting of tribal leaders from throughout New Zealand to choose his successor by consensus. They chose Nga wai hono i te po, Tūheitia's youngest child and only daughter. As is custom, she was revealed as the next monarch on the last morning of her father's tangi at Tūrangawaewae marae in Ngāruawāhia and then crowned, making her the youngest reigning monarch in the world.

== Background and process ==
The kahui ariki, the Māori royal family, is usually defined as the descendants of King Tāwhiao. Tūheitia first appointed his Tekau-mā-rua, the privy council of the Māori monarch, in 2014 from important Māori leaders, both male and female, from across the country. Appointing members from across New Zealand is a relatively new innovation; prior to 1989, all members of the Tekau-mā-rua were Tainui. The Tekau-mā-rua meet four times a year at Tūrangawaewae.

The monarch is chosen in a closed meeting by iwi who support the Kīngitanga. The previous monarch may have a say in who succeeds them; for example, Tūheitia himself was "shocked" to learn of his mother's endorsement of him, which occurred on her deathbed, after she reportedly changed her mind about his sister Heeni Katipa, who had long been singled out to succeed her.

== Election ==
For the first few days after Tūheitia's death, the subject of his succession was not discussed, allowing mourners time to grieve him first. The process of choosing the Māori monarch lay with the Tekau-mā-rua, who were to meet and begin deliberations on the night of 3 September. The job of the fourteen members of the Tekau-mā-rua was to convene a wānanga (forum) of tribal leaders who would choose the monarch by consensus. Tumu Te Heuheu presided over the wānanga, assisted by Che Wilson, the Tekau-mā-rua chairperson. The leaders attending the wānanga were from throughout New Zealand, but excluding the tribes of the Tainui confederation (Waikato, Ngāti Maniapoto, Ngāti Raukawa, and Pare Hauraki). About half the leaders were women and half men, whereas not many women were in the wānanga that selected Tūheitia in 2006. The Tekau-mā-rua did not suggest any candidate, but left it to the wider wānanga. Only if the wānanga could not agree would the Tekau-mā-rua have chosen the monarch.

The wānanga met in the Māhinārangi meeting house at Tūrangawaewae for six hours and chose Nga wai hono i te po, the daughter of Tūheitia. Naida Glavish, one of the attendees related, "When the discussion was agreed Tā Tumu Te Heuheu stood up asking the question of everybody in the room about Ngā Wai Hono i te Pō being the new monarch," to which they all agreed.

Nga wai hono i te po had been widely expected to succeed her father. Aged 27 at the time of the election, she is substantially younger than the then-youngest reigning monarch of a sovereign nation, the Emir of Qatar. She had been working on behalf of her father for several years, attending official engagements with him and on his behalf, while also taking care of the Kīngitanga royal archives, before her appointment.

Her two older brothers Whatumoana and Korotangi Paki were not expected to be elected. In 2013, Tūheitia had announced that his second-born son Korotangi Paki would not succeed him as king due to concerns about his readiness. This announcement received mixed responses but reflected Tūheitia's commitment to the future stability of the Kīngitanga. Korotangi was subsequently convicted of drunk driving in 2014 and assaulting his girlfriend in 2020. Tūheitia also fell out with his first-born son Whatumoana Paki, after the latter married Rangimarie Tahana in June 2022. The Office of the Kīngitanga publicly denounced their wedding and stripped Whatumoana of his royal title.
