= Ard van der Vorst =

Dutch diplomat

Ard van der Vorst (born 28 September 1969 in Breda) is a Dutch diplomat who is the ambassador to New Zealand.

Van der Vorst studied public administration at Leiden University. He worked on behalf of the Dutch Ministry of Foreign Affairs in Tirana, Abuja, Ramallah, San Francisco and Atlanta, among other places. Since 2022, Van der Vorst has been ambassador to New Zealand, based in Wellington.

Following the death of Māori King Tūheitia, Van der Vorst posted on X, "At this difficult moment my thoughts are with the Kingitanga family and Tainui people. May his legacy inspire to continue to build a future as he envisioned. Rest in Peace."
