= Nga wai hono i te po =

Māori Queen since 2024

- Te Arikinui Kuīni
- Nga wai hono i te po in 2026

Māori Queen
- Reign: 5 September 2024 – present
- Coronation: 5 September 2024
- Predecessor: Tūheitia
- Born: Nga wai hono i te po Paki; 13 January 1997 (age 29); Waikato, New Zealand
Regnal name
- Nga wai hono i te po Pōtatau Te Wherowhero VIII
- Kāhui Ariki: Te Wherowhero
- Father: Tūheitia
- Mother: Makau Ariki Te Atawhai
- Religion: Roman Catholicism
- Education: University of Waikato (BA, MA)

Nga wai hono i te po (Note: Māori pronunciation: [ŋaː wai ˈhono i te poː]; also written with different capitalisation and/or with long vowels written with macrons or as duplicated vowels, e.g. Ngā Wai Hono i te Pō, Ngā wai hono i te pō, Ngaa wai hono i te poo, etc.) (born 13 January 1997) is the Māori queen. She has reigned since 2024, when she was elected to succeed her father King Tūheitia. The youngest child and only daughter of Tūheitia, she is a direct descendant of the first Māori king, Pōtatau Te Wherowhero, who was installed in 1858. Titled Te Arikinui Kuīni, (Note: Māori pronunciation: [te ˈaɾikiˌnui kuˈiːni]) she is the eighth monarch and the second queen of the Kīngitanga.

Nga wai hono i te po was born into the Kīngitanga royal family during the reign of her paternal grandmother Te Arikinui Dame Te Atairangikaahu. Her parents are Kīngi Tūheitia Pōtatau Te Wherowhero VII and Makau Ariki Atawhai Paki. Her early life was steeped in the cultural and spiritual practices of the Māori people, with a particular focus on the traditions of the Kīngitanga movement.

Following the death of her father, Nga wai hono i te po was selected as the Māori queen by a wānanga (forum) of tribal leaders that was convened by the Tekau-mā-rua. Her coronation took place at Tūrangawaewae Marae, the seat of the Kīngitanga, in a ceremony attended by leaders and dignitaries from across the country and the Pacific. Her accession was seen as a continuation of the Kīngitanga's mission to unify Māori people and protect their rights.

== Early life and education ==
Nga wai hono i te po Paki was born on 13 January 1997, the third child and only daughter born to Tūheitia Paki and his wife Te Atawhai. Her paternal grandmother was Te Arikinui Dame Te Atairangikaahu, the only previous Māori queen. She has two older brothers, Whatumoana Paki and Korotangi Paki. Te Atairangikaahu was on the annual Tira Hoe Waka canoe journey down the Whanganui River and had stopped for the night at Parikino Marae when she heard that her granddaughter had been born. She asked Whanganui kuia Julie Ranginui for a name for the baby, and together they settled on Nga wai hono i te po (meaning "the waters joining in the night"), referring to the meeting of Waikato River people with Whanganui River people that night. Max Mariu, the first Māori Catholic bishop as Auxiliary Bishop of Wellington, baptised Nga wai hono i te po in Huntly, at the request of Te Atairangikaahu.

Māori is her first language. She has been deeply immersed in Māori culture and traditions from an early age. When Nga wai hono i te po was nine years old, Te Atairangikaahu died and her father became Māori king. Nga wai hono i te po travelled to Taumarunui with her family to receive instruction from priests for Confirmation, and made her first Confession in a chapel at Hopuhopu, near Ngāruawāhia. In 2007, she was Confirmed and received First Communion at a Mass during the Koroneihana celebrations on the first anniversary of her father's coronation.

She had her school education at Te Wharekura o Rakaumanga, a year 1–15 kura kaupapa Māori (Māori-language school) in Huntly. She received a Sir Edmund Hillary Scholarship to study for a Bachelor of Arts at the University of Waikato. She began teaching kapa haka in her second year at university. She finished a BA in Tikanga Māori and Reo Māori (Māori language) in 2017 and then entered a Masters degree studying Tikanga Māori, which she completed in 2020. She received a moko kauae (chin tattoo) in 2016, at age 19, along with her mother and her cousin Nanaia Mahuta, to celebrate her father's tenth anniversary on the throne.

== Early career ==
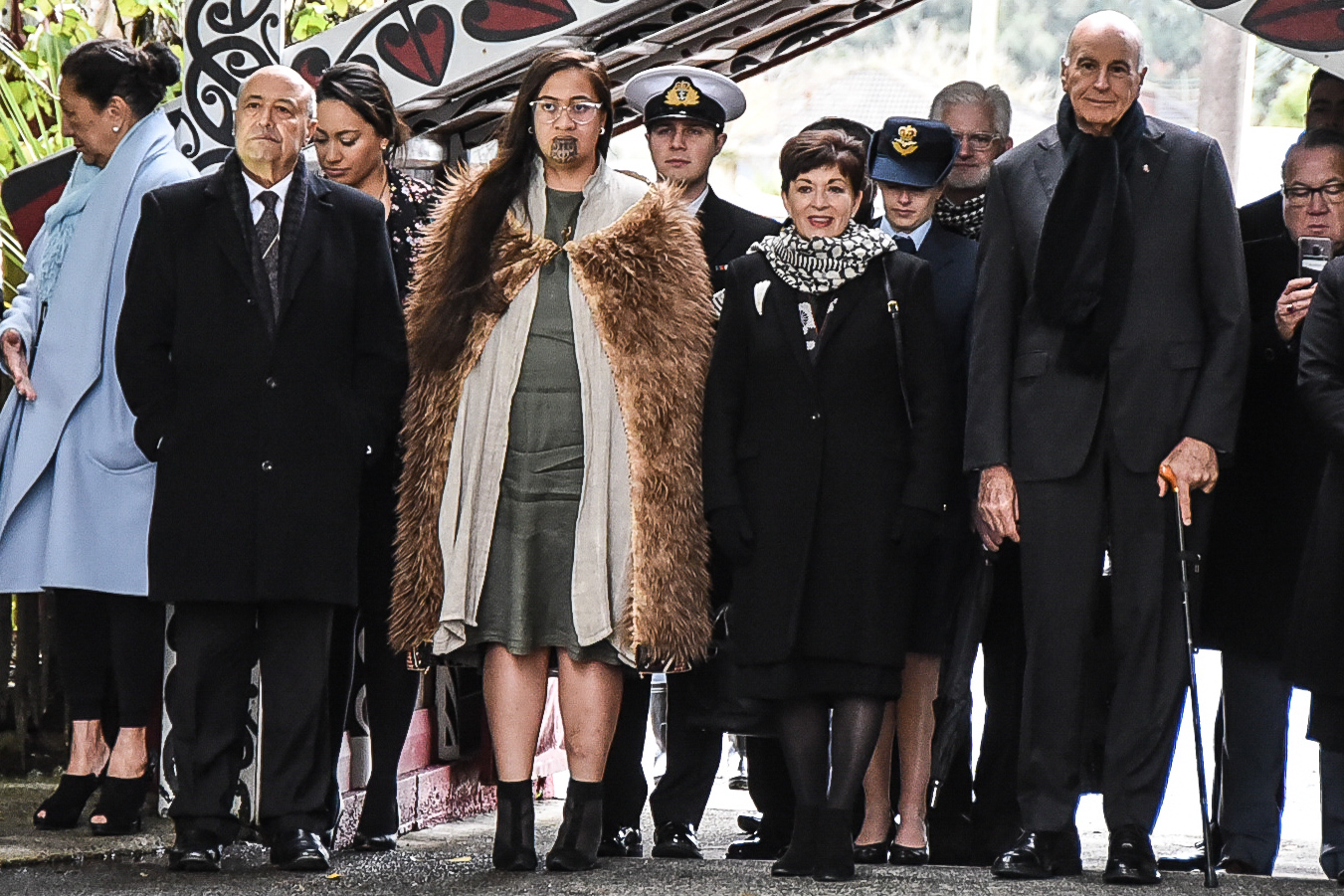
Nga wai hono i te po with Patsy Reddy and David Gascoigne at Koroneihana 2019

Nga wai hono i te po started to take a more prominent role in the Kīngitanga in her early twenties as she began to represent her father at cultural and political events. In 2022, she met with then Prince Charles in London. She was appointed to the Waitangi National Trust Board in 2020, and appointed to the University of Waikato Council for a four-year term in 2023. She was a board member of the Waikato-Tainui College for Research and Development. She attended meetings of the Te Kōhanga Reo National Trust board as a representative of the king, who was the patron of the trust.

== Accession and reign ==
Nga wai hono i te po acceded to the throne at the age of 27, the second-youngest to do so. Her accession was not automatic, as the Māori monarchy is not strictly hereditary. However, her growing prominence in the years preceding her election, including her participation in official engagements and representation of Māori interests, positioned her as a strong candidate. Upon her accession, she was younger than the youngest reigning monarch of a sovereign nation (Tamim bin Hamad Al Thani, the sovereign Emir of Qatar).

Tūheitia's death on 30 August 2024 triggered the selection of his successor by a wānanga (forum) of tribal leaders who chose her by consensus. The wānanga was convened by the Tekau-mā-rua (the Kīngitanga advisory council), a diverse group of prominent Māori iwi leaders, academics, executives, and politicians from across many iwi, and presided over by Tumu Te Heuheu. The announcement of her selection and her installation took place during the tangihanga (funeral) of her father, Kiingi Tūheitia, at Tūrangawaewae Marae. In this ceremony, known as Te Whakawahinga, the Tekau-mā-rua escorted her to the throne, a Bible was placed on her head, a tradition that dates back to the establishment of the role, and she was anointed by Archbishop Donald Tamihere.

On 22 October 2024, Nga wai hono i te po attended a national hui for unity at Tuahiwi Marae, near Christchurch, focusing on indigenous economies. This was the third in four hui called by her father in response to the National Party-led coalition government's policies towards Māori. On 19 November 2024 in Wellington, she joined tens of thousands of people in the Hīkoi mō te Tiriti, a nationwide protest against the ACT Party's Treaty Principles Bill.

On 23 January 2025, Nga wai hono i te po made her first visit as Māori Queen to Rātana Pā as part of the annual Rātana church celebrations. On 19 May 2025, Nga wai hono i te po made her first official visit to Whakatū Marae in the South Island's Marlborough District, where she was welcomed by the leadership of the eight local tribes.

Koroneihana 2025 was the first anniversary of her accession, and was hosted at Tūrangawaewae marae. 9,000 people attended the ceremony including Te Pāti Māori co-leader Debbie Ngarewa-Packer. During a public address on 5 September, Nga wai hono i te po talked about Māori identity in modern New Zealand. She also launched two economic initiatives: namely a summit to develop economic opportunities for Māori and a seed investment fund supported by Māori entities.

Nga wai hono i te po and New Zealand Ambassador to the United Arab Emirates Richard Kay led a New Zealand delegation to Abu Dhabi which met with Emirati Princess Latifa bint Mohammed bin Rashid Al Maktoum and Minister of State for Foreign Trade Thani bin Ahmed Al Zeyoudi to strengthen bilateral cultural and trade relations on 7 October 2025.

On 29 November 2025, she launched a new multimillion dollar Māori investment platform called the "Kotahitanga Fund" at the inaugural Ohanga ki te Ao Māori Economic Summit in Hamilton.

In mid-May 2026, Nga wai hono i te po visited the United Kingdom to mark the 50th anniversary of the King's Trust, a charity focused on helping vulnerable young people. She met with Prince William at Windsor Castle (her first meeting with a member of the royal family since her accession), had an audience with Charles III, and attended a garden party for the King's Trust at Buckingham Palace.

During the second Koroneihana in September 2026, she urged Māori to move from a legacy of historical trauma to a future based on economic and social triumph.

== Notes ==
Regnal titles
Preceded by Tūheitia	Queen of the Kīngitanga; 2024–present	Incumbent
