= 2006 Kīngitanga election =

2006 election of the Māori King

← 1966	15–21 August 2006	2024 →
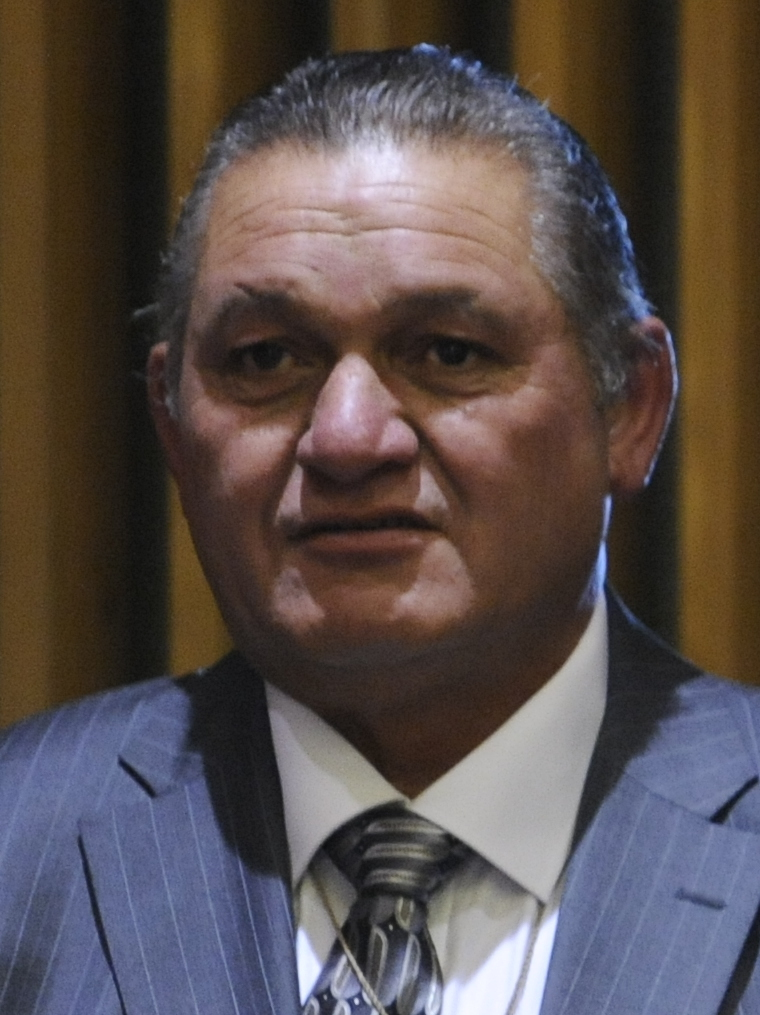
Nominee	Tūheitia
Monarch before election
Te Atairangikaahu †
Elected Monarch
Tūheitia

An election was held to elect the seventh monarch of the Kīngitanga following the death of Te Atairangikaahu on 15 August 2006. The result of the election was announced on 21 August, the day of Te Atairangikaahu's tangihanga; her son Tūheitia Paki was unexpectedly chosen.

== Background ==
It was clear that the incumbent monarch, Te Atairangikaahu, was unwell following the celebrations of her 40th koroneihana earlier in May 2006. On 15 August, she died.

== Potential candidates ==
Though not strictly required, all prior monarchs had been direct descendants of the previous monarch. As such, it was expected that the next monarch would be one of Te Atairangikaahu's seven children, though it was possible that a new monarch could be chosen from another family.

Although Tūheitia was the eldest son, it was expected by most that his older sister Heeni Katipa would be chosen instead as he had not been groomed for the role whilst she had. He had been a truck driver.

Supposedly, Te Atairangikahu on her death bed told Heeni that she desired for Tūheitia to succeed her. The council of chiefs, consisting predominantly of Tainui members, was told this before they made their decision.

== Result ==
Te Atairangikaahu's eldest son Tūheitia Paki was chosen, continuing the hereditary tradition. He was told of the decision to elect him on the night of 20 August, the day before his mother's funeral. He was crowned as Kīngi Tūheitia Potatau Te Wherowhero VII prior to her burial.
