= Tūheitia =

Māori King from 2006 to 2024

- Kīngi
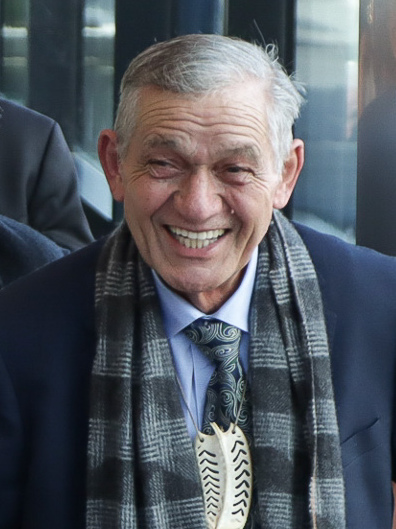
- Tūheitia in 2021

Māori King
- Tenure: 21 August 2006 – 30 August 2024
- Coronation: 21 August 2006
- Predecessor: Dame Te Atairangikaahu
- Successor: Nga wai hono i te po
- Born: Tūheitia Paki; 21 April 1955; Huntly, New Zealand
- Died: 30 August 2024 (aged 69); Hamilton, New Zealand
- Burial: 5 September 2024; Mount Taupiri, New Zealand
- Makau Ariki: Te Atawhai
- Issue: Whatumoana Te Aa Paki; Korotangi Paki; Nga wai hono i te po Paki
Regnal name
- Tūheitia Pōtatau Te Wherowhero VII
- Kāhui Ariki: Te Wherowhero
- Father: Whatumoana Paki
- Mother: Te Atairangikaahu

Tūheitia Pōtatau Te Wherowhero VII GCCT KStJ KCLJ (born Tūheitia Paki; 21 April 1955 – 30 August 2024), crowned as Kīngi Tūheitia, reigned as the Māori King from 2006 until his death in 2024. He was the eldest son of the previous Māori monarch, Te Arikinui Dame Te Atairangikaahu, and was announced as her successor and crowned on 21 August 2006, the final day of her tangi.

Tūheitia was patron to Te Matatini, the largest Māori cultural festival, and also of Kirikiriroa Marae in Hamilton. He signed a formal accord with the Department of Corrections in 2017 that led to the establishment of iwi justice panels, as well as centres for female prisoners to reintegrate into prison life after giving birth. He made numerous state visits and met with other monarchs, including Charles III at the latter's coronation in 2023. Tūheitia also advocated for Māori survivors of climate change in the aftermath of Cyclone Gabrielle.

Among his activities, he involved himself in politics, as does the Kīngitanga as an institution. In January 2024, he held a national hui of Māori unity to respond to the policies of the Sixth National Government towards Māori and the Treaty of Waitangi, which the Kīngitanga believed were regressive and would reverse "decades of hard fought justice."

Tūheitia struggled with poor health throughout his life. In 2024, over a week after his eighteenth koroneihana (coronation anniversary), he died in hospital following cardiac surgery. He was succeeded by his daughter Nga wai hono i te po on the day of his funeral.

== Early life and family ==
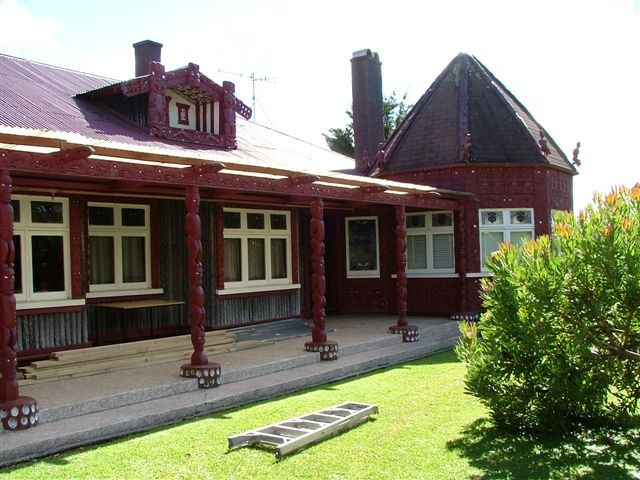
Turongo House, the official royal residence, at Tūrangawaewae

Tūheitia was the son of Whatumoana Paki (1926–2011) and Te Arikinui Dame Te Atairangikaahu (1931–2006), who married in 1952. He was educated at Rakaumanga School in Huntly, Southwell School in Hamilton and St Stephen's College (Te Kura o Tipene) in Bombay, south of Auckland, New Zealand. He had five sisters – Heeni Katipa (née Paki); Tomairangi Paki; Mihi ki te ao Paki; Kiki Solomon (née Paki); Manawa Clarkson (née Paki) – and one brother, Maharaia Paki.

He was married to Te Atawhai, who has the title Makau Ariki, and they had three children: Whatumoana, Korotangi, and Nga wai hono i te po. Following his ascent to the throne, Te Atawhai was appointed patron of the Māori Women's Welfare League in 2007 and Te Kohao Health, a Māori public health organisation.

Tūheitia suffered ill health in 2013 and announced that he was establishing Te Kaunihera a te Kiingi (the King's Council) and deputising his elder son Whatumoana to act in his stead. As the King's representative, Whatumoana was given the title Te Whirinaki a te Kīngi, the title held by Te Wherowhero Tāwhiao while he acted for King Mahuta in the early 1900s. Tūheitia later experienced a falling out with Whatumoana after the latter married Rangimarie Tahana in June 2022. In response, the Office of the Kīngitanga publicly denounced Whatumoana and Tahana's wedding and stripped Whatumoana of his royal title.

In 2013, Tūheitia also announced that his second-born son Korotangi would not succeed him as King due to concerns about his readiness. Korotangi was subsequently convicted of drink-driving offending in 2014 and assaulting his girlfriend in 2020. Following Tūheitia's death in late August 2024, his daughter Nga wai hono i te po succeeded him as Māori Queen.

== Duties and background ==
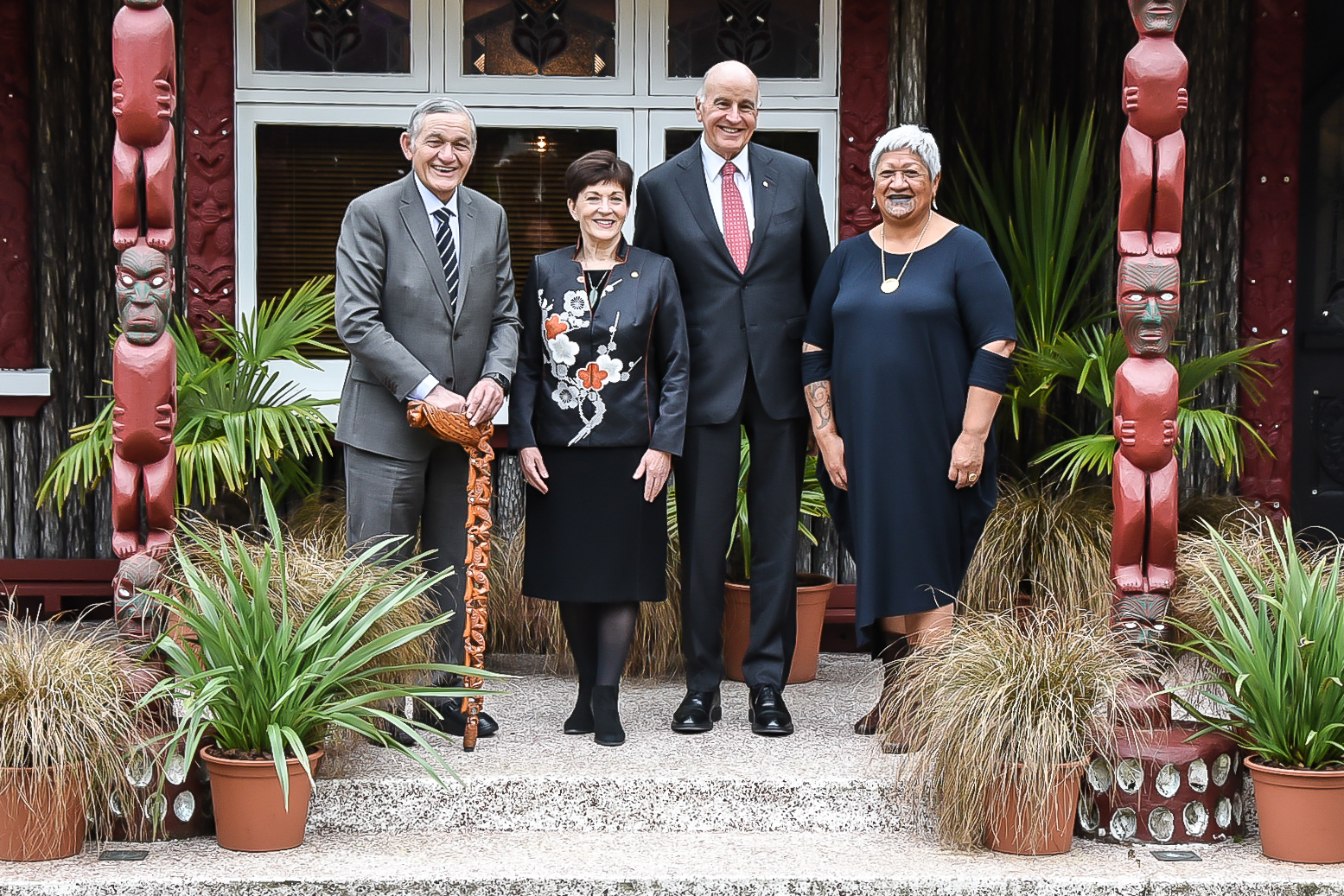
Tūheitia with Dame Patsy Reddy, Sir David Gascoigne, and the Makau Ariki, Atawhai, at Tūrangawaewae for the koroneihana celebrations of 2019

The King generally spoke publicly only once a year, at the annual celebrations in Ngāruawāhia of his coronation.

His official duties included attending the following events:

- funeral of King Tāufaʻāhau Tupou IV of Tonga, September 2006
- opening of Pūkawa Marae on the shore of Lake Taupō, 17–19 November 2006
- opening of "Mauri Ora", an exhibition of Māori artefacts from Te Papa on exhibition at the Tokyo National Museum in Japan on 22 January 2007
- funeral of Malietoa Tanumafili II of Samoa, 19 May 2007
- re-opening of the marae/war memorial hall in Ngaiotonga, Whangaruru, 2007
- opening of the Māori garden in Hamilton Gardens, 2008
- unveiling of Te Kawerau a Maki's new pou for the Arataki Visitor Centre in the Waitākere Ranges in 2011
- haka and speech for the fleet of 110 waka to commemorate 160 years of Kīngitanga in 2018
- coronation of Charles III and Camilla in London, May 2023

King Tūheitia attended hundreds of events every year both nationally and internationally. He was the patron to several key organisations; including Te Matatini, the largest Māori cultural festival in the world, and Kirikiriroa Marae, a large urban marae in Hamilton.

He frequently received international dignitaries, foreign diplomats, members of other royal families, and members of governments. In 2014, the King notably received 26 diplomats to discuss international and trade interests for the Kīngitanga.

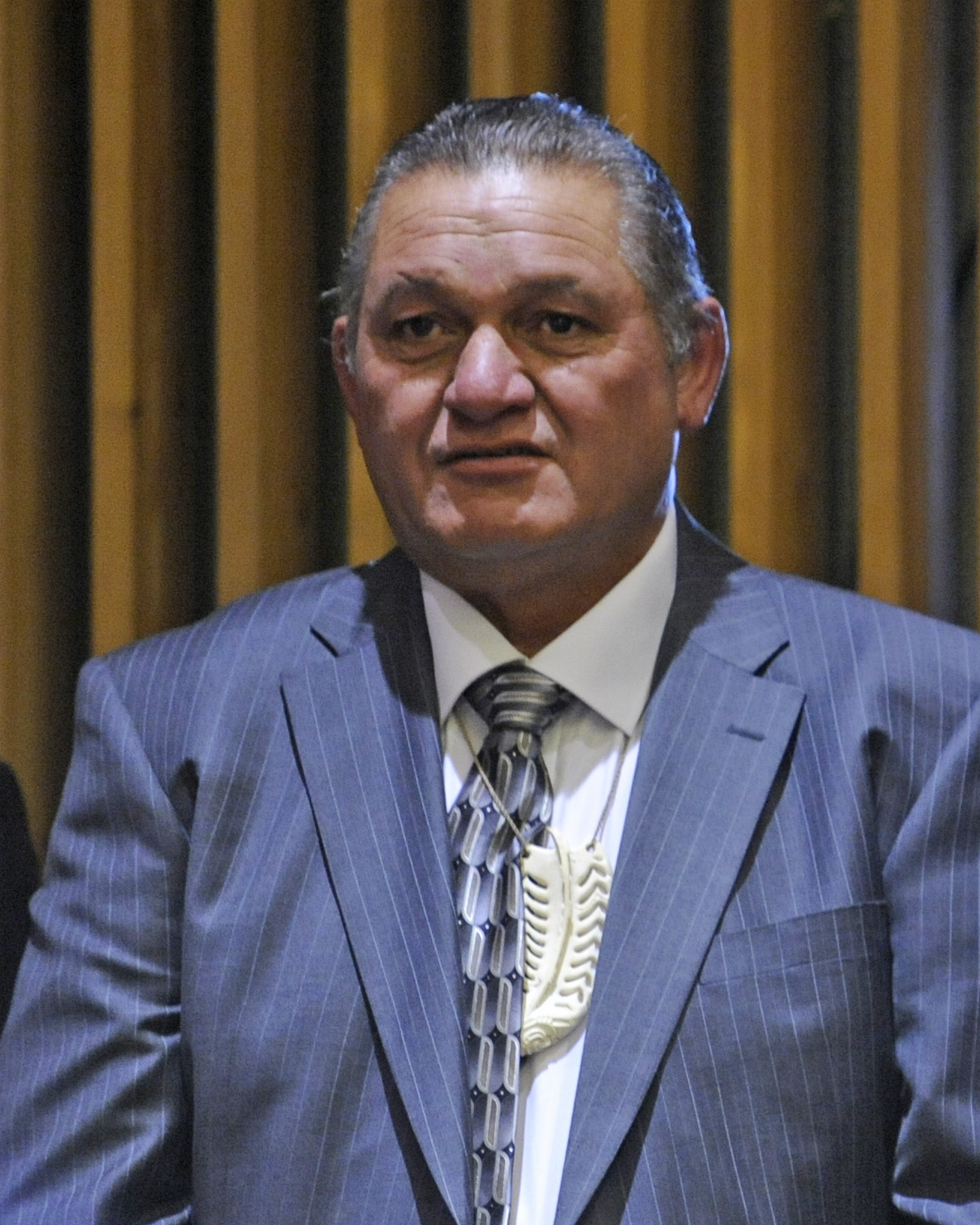
Kīngi Tūheitia in 2009

In 2009, King Tūheitia visited the New Zealand Parliament and was acknowledged in the valedictory speech of the former Prime Minister of New Zealand, Helen Clark. In the same year, the King accompanied Helen Clark to the United Nations upon her appointment as the United Nations Development Programme administrator.

The King regularly attended significant events of Māoridom around the country. In July 2018, the King and Royal family attended the 150th Celebrations of the Ringatu Church, to which the King's eldest grandson, Hikairo, has been baptised. The King also frequently attended the annual 25 January celebrations of the Rātana Church expressing his continued support for all denominations and his deep desire to unify the people.

In 2018, two archbishops of the Anglican Church in Aotearoa, New Zealand and Polynesia visited Tūrangawaewae to join in honouring King Tūheitia and 160 years of the Kīngitanga. In May 2019, King Tūheitia and members of the Whare Ariki travelled to the Vatican City where the King met Pope Francis in a private audience. The two met and discussed issues pertaining to Te Iwi Maori and indigenous peoples around the world. King Tūheitia also issued a formal invitation for the Pope to visit Tūrangawaewae marae and New Zealand.

In the aftermath of Cyclone Gabrielle in 2023, King Tūheitia visited parts of the devastated East Coast across the Ngāti Kahungunu rohe to help rebuild.

== Poukai ==
The Poukai is an annual series of visits by the Māori King to marae around and beyond the Tainui region, a tradition that dates back to the 19th century. Poukai were established by the second Māori King, Tāwhiao, who said "Kua whakatūria e ahau tēnei kaupapa hei whāngai i te pouaru, te pani me te rawakore, he kuaha whānui kua puare ki te puna tangata me te puna kai" (I have instituted this gathering to feed the widowed, the bereaved and the destitute, it is a doorway that has been opened to the multitudes of people and the bounty of food).

There are 29 Poukai every year and King Tūheitia attended each one. Poukai are a critical event in the Kīngitanga calendar. A unique element of Poukai is their focus on: te pani (the bereaved), te pouaru (the widowed) and te rawakore (the destitute). These events, led by the monarch, are put in place to assist and help ease the burdens and challenges faced by people.

== Political involvement ==
King Tūheitia was at the forefront of many political issues, particularly pertaining to Māori.

In February 2017, King Tūheitia signed a formal accord with the Department of Corrections; the accord would later be recognised by an award from Corrections in August the same year. The accord led to the development of "iwi justice panels", and a further partnership with Corrections to build a reintegration centre for incarcerated women who gave birth while in prison. In a visit to a women's prison in Auckland, the King visited mothers and their children and pledged to do more for all incarcerated people. In 2018, the King launched, in collaboration with the New Zealand Police and Ministry of Justice, the iwi justice panel. This approach to restorative justice aims to reduce incarceration rates among Māori, which are among the highest for an indigenous people in the world.

=== 2024 national hui ===
In December 2023, King Tūheitia issued a royal proclamation to hold a national hui (meeting) to promote Māori unity in January 2024. The hui was in response to the Kīngitanga movement's concerns that the new National-led coalition government's policies towards the Treaty of Waitangi would reverse "decades of hard fought justice." The national hui was held at Tūrangawaewae marae on 20 January 2024. Key topics expected to be discussed at the hui included the Government's proposals to abolish Te Aka Whai Ora (the Māori Health Authority), roll back the use of the Māori language in the public service, repeal the Smokefree Environments and Regulated Products (Smoked Tobacco) Amendment Act 2022 and review the principles of the Treaty of Waitangi. During his address, Tuheitia said “the best protest we can do right now is be Māori, be who we are, live our values, speak our reo, care for our mokopuna.”

On 15 January 2024, King Tūheitia met with Prime Minister Christopher Luxon and Minister for Māori Development Tama Potaka and discussed several of the Government's policies including the proposed Treaty Principles legislation and plans to roll back the use of Māori language in the public service. The King's chaplain, Archdeacon Simmonds, stated that the King would continue to speak Māori regardless of Government policy and direction.

On 20 January, 10,000 people attended the national hui at Tuurangawaewae Marae including former Prime Minister Jenny Shipley, activist and artist Tame Iti, former New Zealand First and National MP Tau Henare, former Te Pāti Māori president Tuku Morgan, and National MPs Tama Potaka and Dan Bidois (who attended as government representatives). The national hui commenced with five workshops focusing on the Māori language, Treaty of Waitangi, national identity, oranga tangata (well-being of people) and oranga taiao (well-being of nature) followed by a plenary session. Tūheitia addressed attendees at 4pm.

During his address, King Tūheitia stated that "the best protest we can do right now is be Māori, be who we are, live our values, speak our reo ['language'], care for our mokopuna ['children']." He also said that the world was watching and urged the Government not to tamper with the Treaty of Waitangi in its proposed legislation. Tūheitia also said that other indigenous nations were supporting the Māori cause and that the kohanga movement had a new generation of leaders.

King Tūheitia attended a further national hui, held at Hastings in late May 2024.

=== 18th koroneihana ===
In mid-August 2024, Tūheitia's eighteenth koroneihana (coronation anniversary celebration) was held at Tūrangawaewae Marae in Ngāruawāhia. Invitations were extended to leaders across the New Zealand political spectrum. While the National, Labour, New Zealand First, Te Pāti Māori and the Greens accepted the invitations extended to their leaders, ACT declined. At the event, both Prime Minister Luxon and NZ First senior minister Shane Jones reiterated that their respective parties would not support ACT's Treaty Principles Bill beyond its first reading.

== Personal life and death ==
Tūheitia was a truck driver before becoming the Māori King. His time in the profession was widely reported on after his death, although he spent most of his career as administrator at Te Wānanga o Aotearoa. At the time of his ascension, Tūheitia was cultural adviser to Te Wānanga and had previously managed its campus in Huntly. According to Willie Jackson, former Minister of Māori Development, Tūheitia was never groomed to be king, and was given short notice about his ascension in 2006 by his dying mother. He was apparently "almost immediately assailed by lobbyists and political groups jockeying for his favour". Tūheitia was known for his bright and exuberant personality, and was described as a “a bit of a character” by the Waikato Times. He co-founded the Huntly-based Taniwharau Culture Group, a kapa haka, and regularly participated.

Tūheitia suffered from poor health throughout much of his reign. At his koroneihana in 2014, he revealed he was battling diabetes and an unspecified type of cancer. He had to appoint his son Whatumoana as regent in 2013 because of his health battles, and in December 2016 underwent a kidney transplant donated by his youngest son, Korotangi.

On 30 August 2024, over a week after his eighteenth koroneihana, Tūheitia died while recovering from heart surgery in hospital in Hamilton. He was 69. A new monarch, his daughter Nga wai hono i te po, was elected by leaders of tribes associated with the Kīngitanga on the day of Tūheitia's funeral.

== Tekau-ma-Rua and Te Kahui Wairua ==
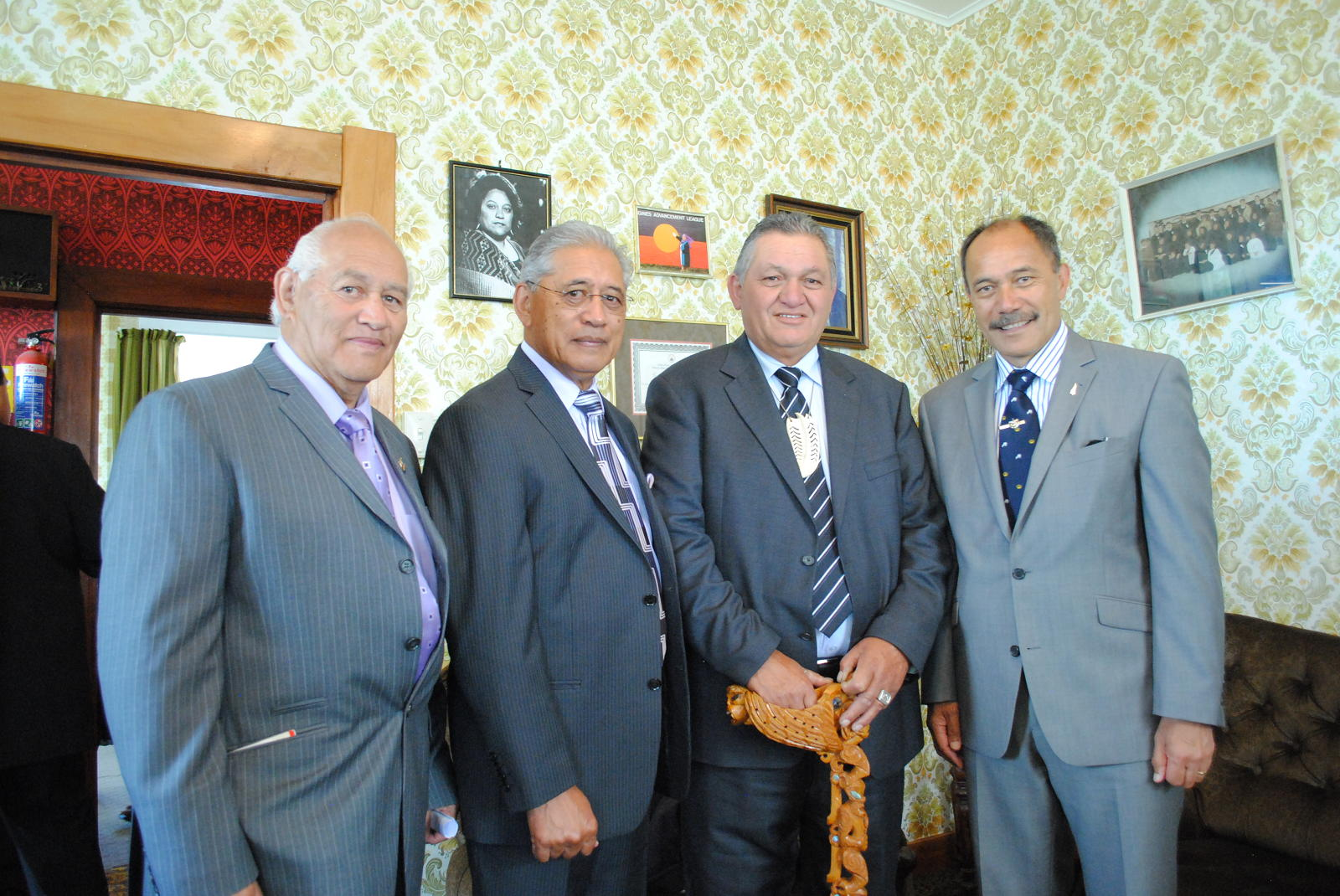
Māori leaders at Rātana Pā on 25 January 2012. (L-R) Harerangi Meihana, Sir Tumu Te Heuheu, Kingi Tūheitia and Sir Jerry Mateparae

An advisory council, the Tekau-mā-Rua ('the Twelve'), exists to offer advice and act as a senior council within the Kīngitanga. From the time of Tāwhiao to Te Atairangikaahu, the Tekau-mā-Rua were selected from within Tainui, the monarch's tribal confederation. Historically all members were men. Te Atairangikaahu's council went into recess after Henare Tuwhangai died in 1989. King Tūheitia decided to re-establish the Tekau-mā-Rua, but made up of members from outside Tainui, and including women. He asked iwi leaders in August 2013 to suggest candidates. Forty-eight iwi leaders from around New Zealand met in March 2014 and selected members. Hemana Manuera was the inaugural chair, and other members included Pou Temara, Sir Toby Curtis, Kihi Ngatai, Mere Broughton and June Mariu. Tūheitia established a spiritual council, Te Kāhui Wairua, at the same time, with membership from various churches. These two councils worked together in providing advice, guidance and a strategic platform for the King and the Kīngitanga.

=== Tekau-mā-Rua ===
At August 2023:

Member	Karangatanga (representative area)
Che Wilson (Chairperson)	Te Wainuiarua-Whanganui
Rikirangi Gage	Te Whānau-ā-Apanui
Hemana Manuera	Ngāti Awa
Sir Pou Temara	Ngāi Tūhoe
Te Kahautu Maxwell	Te Whakatohea
Sir Herewini Parata	Ngāti Porou
Wharehoka Wano	Taranaki
Jerry Hapuku	Ngāti Kahungunu
Hone Harawira	Taitokerau
Turi Ngatai	Tauranga Moana
(Vacant)	Te Arawa
Justin Tipa	Te Wai Pounamu

At 2020:

Companion members (Mema Āpiti)
Prue Kapua – Māori Women's Welfare League
Dame Iritana Tawhiwhirangi – Te Kōhanga Reo
Sir Taihakurei Durie – NZ Māori Council

=== Te Kāhui Wairua ===
At 2020:

Member	Karangatanga (denomination)
Tumuaki Rev. Diana Tana (Chairperson)	Te Hāhi Weteriana / The Methodist Church
Rev. Rex Nathan	Te Hāhi Weteriana / The Methodist Church
Apotoro Takiwa Joe Everitt	Te Hāhi Ratana / The Rātana Church
Rev. Wayne Te Kaawa	Te Aka Puaho / The Presbyterian Church
Rev. Mahaki Albert	Te Aka Puaho / The Presbyterian Church
(Vacant)	Pai Mārire
Poutikanga Wirangi Pera	Te Hāhi Ringatu / The Ringatu Church
Ven. Ngira Simmonds (Note: Archdeacon Simmonds is the chaplain to the Kiingitanga and private chaplain to the King.)	Te Hāhi Mihinare / The Anglican Church
Rt. Rev'd Ngarahu Katene	Te Hāhi Mihinare / The Anglican Church
(Vacant)	Te Hāhi Katorika / The Catholic Church

== Honours ==
Standard of King Tūheitia
- Use: Small vexillological symbol or pictogram in black and white showing the different uses of the flag

- In 2009, King Tūheitia was appointed a Knight of the Venerable Order of Saint John by Queen Elizabeth II, and he was presented with the insignia for the honour by the governor-general, Sir Jerry Mateparae in 2016 during the 10th anniversary commemorations of the King's coronation.
- He was appointed a Knight Grand Cross of the Order of the Crown of Tonga during the coronation ceremonies of King George Tupou V of Tonga.
- In 2010, he was appointed a Knight Commander of the Order of Saint Lazarus.
- In 2014, he established and became the first sovereign head of the Māori Kīngi Honours
- In 2016, in celebration of the King's 10th Coronation Anniversary, the mayor of Hamilton awarded him the city's highest honour, the Freedom of the City. In the same year, the King also received an honorary doctorate from the University of Waikato.

Regnal titles
Preceded by Te Atairangikaahu	King of the Kīngitanga; 2006–2024	Succeeded by Nga wai hono i te po
