= Koroneihana =

Māori monarchal ceremony

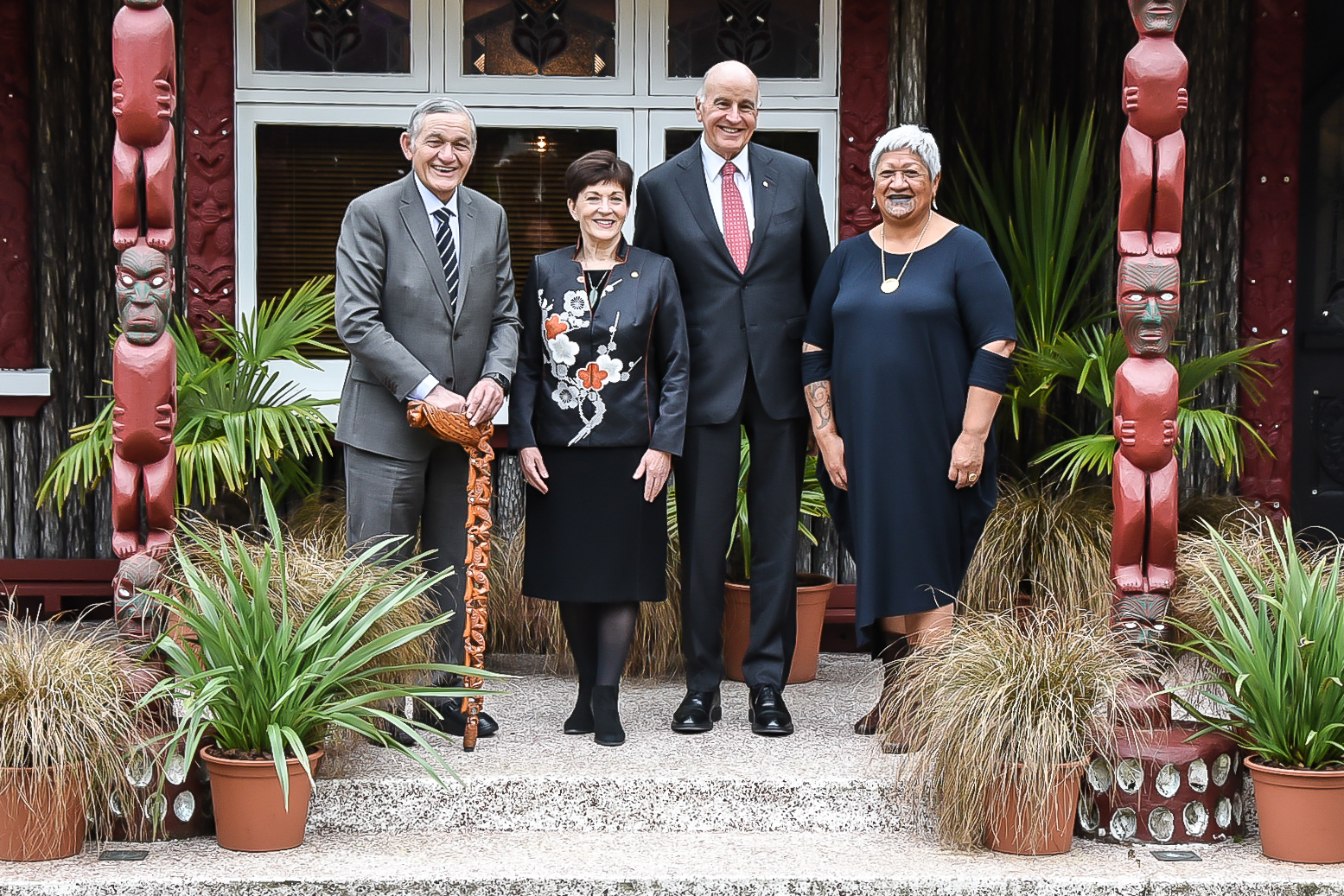
Kīngi Tūheitia, Dame Patsy Reddy, Sir David Gascoigne, and Makau Ariki Atawhai at the 2019 Koroneihana celebrations

Koroneihana (Māori for 'coronation') are the week-long annual celebrations of the anniversary of the Māori monarch's accession and coronation. They are held at the monarch's official residence of Tūrangawaewae marae in Ngāruawāhia in the Waikato.

In 2024, the koroneihana was held in August to coincide with the 18th anniversary of King Tūheitia's accession.

Koroneihana 2025 was held in September, the first of Nga wai hono i te po's reign. It included her first public speech, following the end of the year-long period of mourning as is custom.

During Koroneihana 2026, iwi have gathered at Tūrangawaewae to remember a generation of formidable leaders lost over the past year.
