= Tekau-mā-rua =

Official council of advisors to the Māori monarch

The Tēkau-mā-rua ("The Twelve") is the official council of the Māori monarch of the Kīngitanga.

The council was originally established by King Tawhiao, who was inspired by the twelve apostles of Jesus, to assist in running the Kīngitanga. Members were initially only selected from rangatira within Tainui, and replaced when they died.

During her reign, Te Atairangikaahu did not appoint new members to the Tēkau-mā-rua. As a result, when Henare Tuwhangai, the last remaining member, died in 1989 the council went into recess.

In 2014, King Tuheitia re-established the Tēkau-mā-rua and expanded the membership to include rangatira from iwi from throughout New Zealand, not just Tainui. This included members selected by each of Te Kohanga Reo, the Māori Women's Welfare League and the Māori Council.

Its members are currently:

Name	Tribal affiliation(s)
Che Wilson (chairperson)	Ngāti Rangi
Pou Temara	Tūhoe
Rikirangi Gage	Te Whānau-a-Apanui
Peeni Henare	Ngāti Hine, Ngāpuhi
Hone Harawira	Ngāti Hau, Ngāti Wai, Ngāti Hine, Te Aupōuri, Ngāpuhi, Ngāti Whātua
Te Kahautu Maxwell	Ngāi Tai, Ngāti Awa, Te Whānau a Apanui, Ngāti Porou, Tūhoe, Ngāti Maniapoto
Wharehoka Wano	Te Ātiawa, Taranaki, Ngāti Awa
Selwyn Parata	Ngāti Porou
Jerry Hapuku	Ngāti Kahungunu
Companion members
Edward Taihakurei Durie	Rangitāne, Ngāti Kauwhata, Ngāti Raukawa
Kahurangi Iritana Tāwhiwhirangi	Ngāti Porou, Ngāti Kahungunu, Ngāpuhi
Prue Kapua	Te Arawa
