= Ngāruawāhia =

Town in Waikato, New Zealand

- Town
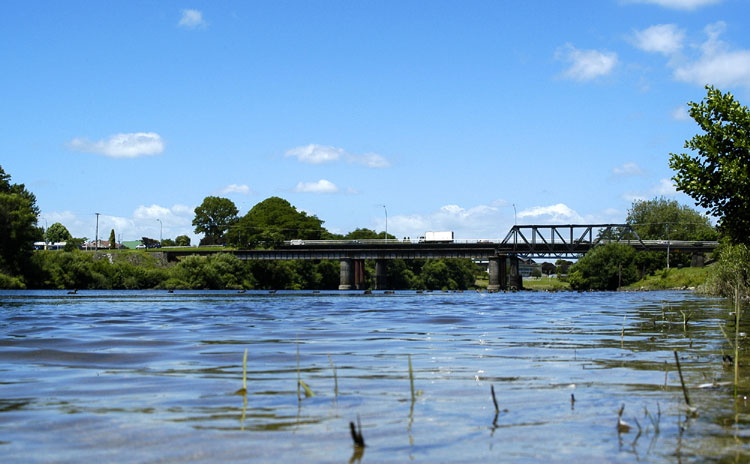
- Waikato River passing through Ngāruawāhia
- Interactive map of Ngāruawāhia
- Coordinates: 37°40′S 175°9′E
- Country: New Zealand
- Region: Waikato
- District: Waikato District
- Wards: Newcastle-Ngāruawāhia General Ward; Tai Runga Takiwaa Maaori Ward
- Community: Ngāruawāhia Community
- Electorates: Waikato; Taranaki-King Country; Hauraki-Waikato (Māori)

Government
  - Territorial authority: Waikato District Council
  - Regional council: Waikato Regional Council
  - Mayor of Waikato: Aksel Bech
  - Waikato MP and Taranaki-King Country MP: Tim van de Molen and Barbara Kuriger
  - Hauraki-Waikato MP: Hana-Rawhiti Maipi-Clarke

Area
  - Territorial: 11.86 km^{2} (4.58 sq mi)

Population (June 2025)
  - Territorial: 8,570
  - Density: 723/km^{2} (1,870/sq mi)
- Time zone: UTC+12 (NZST)
  - Summer (DST): UTC+13 (NZDT)

Ngāruawāhia (Māori pronunciation: [ŋaːɾʉaˈwaːhia]) is a town in the Waikato region of the North Island of New Zealand. It is located 20 kilometres (12 mi) north-west of Hamilton at the confluence of the Waikato and Waipā Rivers, adjacent to the Hakarimata Range.

== History ==
=== Early history ===
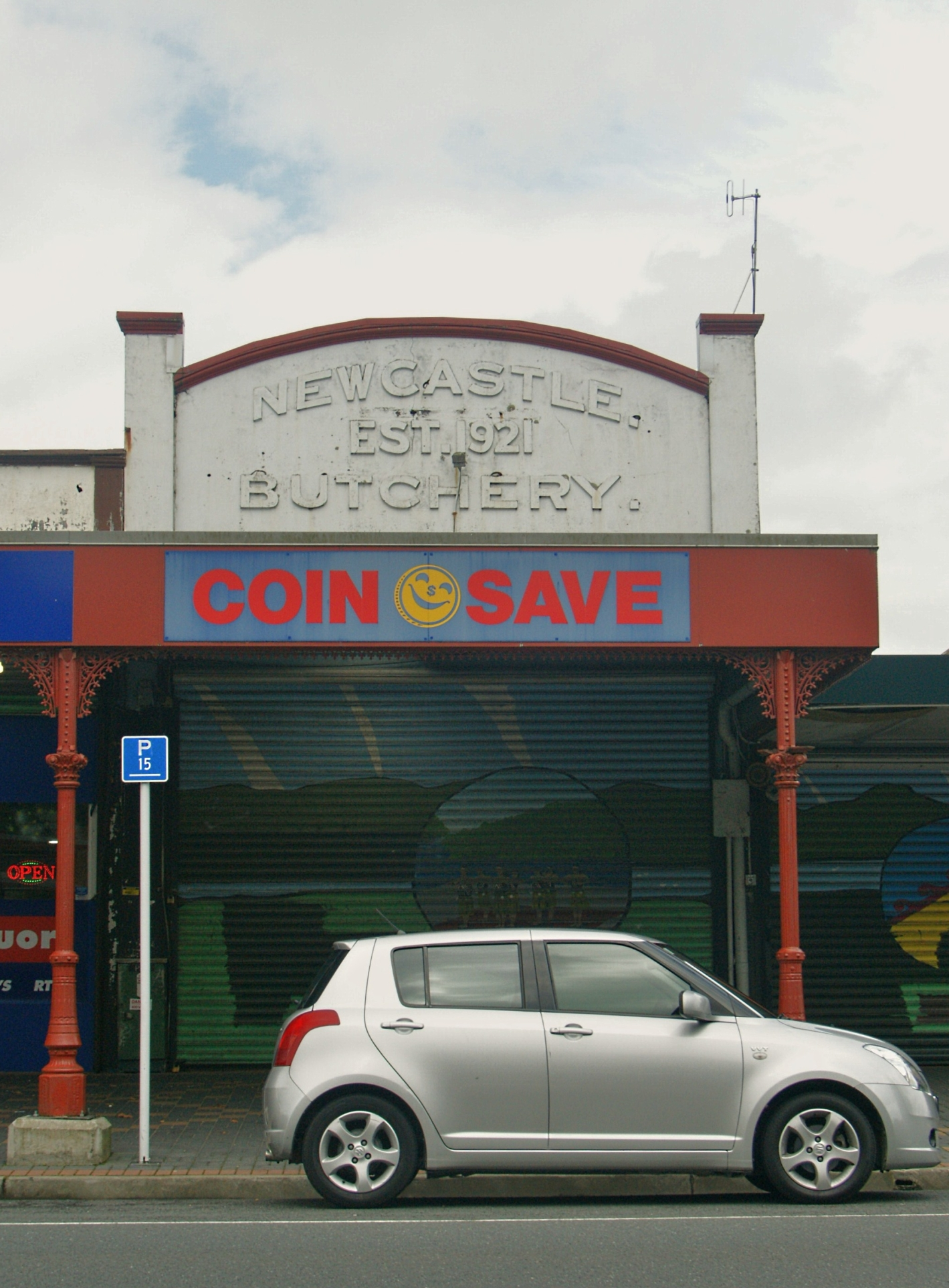
One of the few surviving examples of Ngāruawāhia's previous name is the old Newcastle Butchery building, c. 1921

The name Ngāruawāhia means "the opened food pits", which derives from a great feast in the 17th century. Te Ngaere, a Ngāti Tamainupō chief, and Heke-i-te-rangi, a Ngāti Maniapoto woman, had eloped and settled at Ngāruawāhia, causing a rift between their tribes. When their first child was born, Ngāti Maniapoto were invited to the celebration in an attempt to reconcile the tribes. Te Ngaere's father named the boy Te Mana-o-te-rangi in honour of Ngāti Maniapoto. Peace was established between the tribes, and Te Ngaere shouted "Wāhia ngā rua" (break open the food pits).

=== 19th century ===
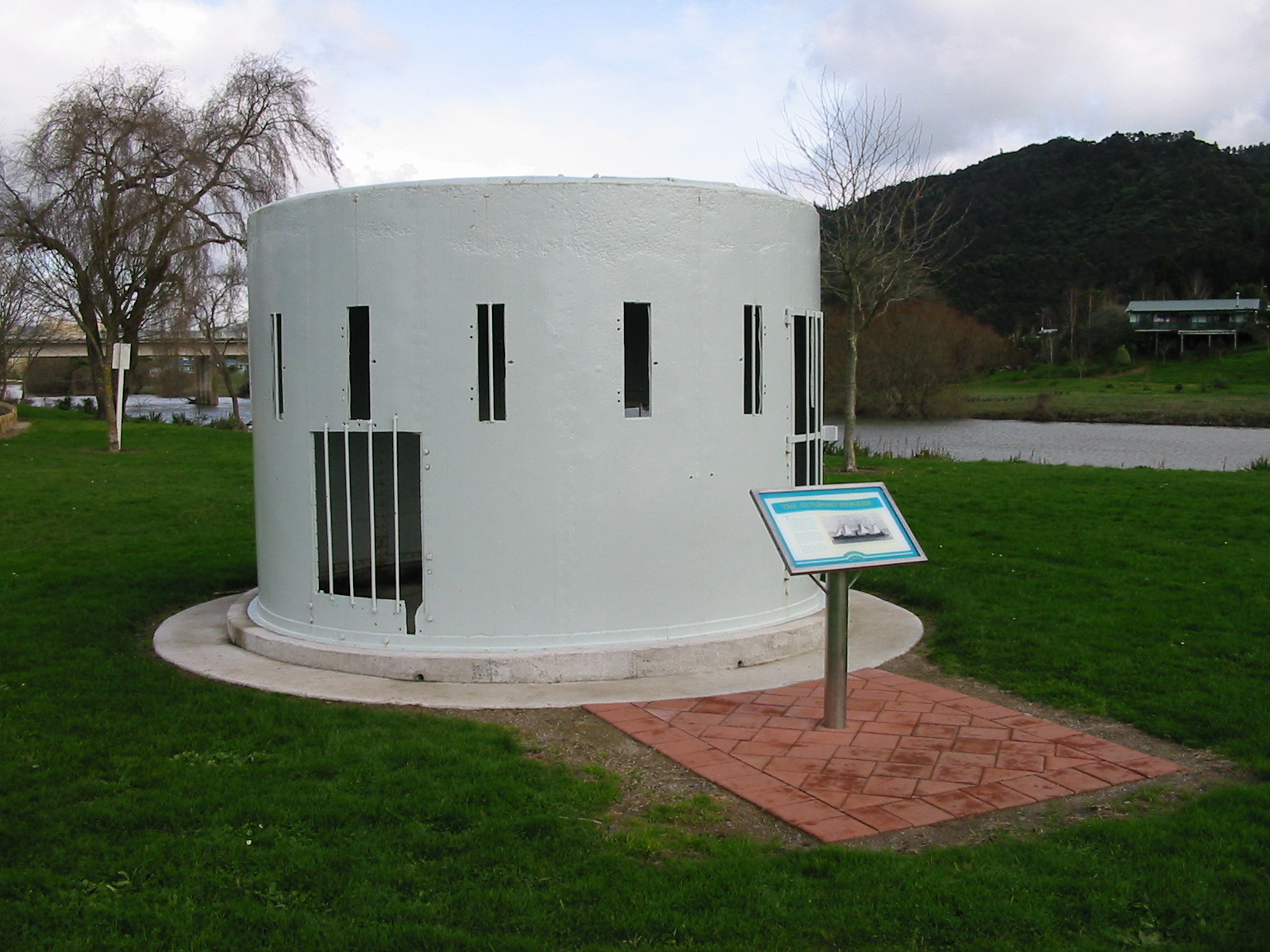
A gun turret of the paddle-steamer gunboat Pioneer, now mounted near the Waikato River

Waikato chief Pōtatau Te Wherowhero was crowned the first Māori king at Ngāruawāhia in 1858 and settled there beside the very confluence of the Waikato and Waipā rivers.

When Rangiriri pā was taken by General Cameron during the invasion of the Waikato after a white flag of truce was flown, Cameron informed Māori that Governor Grey would only come to talk peace if his forces were allowed to enter Ngāruawāhia unopposed. Cameron entered a deserted Ngāruawāhia on 8 December 1863, but Grey never came to talk peace. Despite Māori protest, sales of confiscated land and settlement by Europeans went ahead in 1864, shortly after the invasion, and Ngāruawāhia was renamed "Queenstown". It was renamed again, to "Newcastle", in 1870. The town returned to the original name in 1878.

Hopuhopu is 5 km (3.1 mi) north of Ngāruawāhia. From 1853 Hopuhopu had a boys' mission school, which lost most of its pupils in 1862 and, by 1863, was reported as in disrepair. The mission house burnt down in 1886.

=== 20th century ===
A 100 hp (75 kW) gas power station was built in Herschell St in 1913 by the Town Board for lighting. It used Glen Massey coal, which was converted to gas in a Cambridge Patent Gas Producer (many were used about this time in Australasia) and used to drive a 2-cylinder gas engine. It closed in 1924. Much of the machinery was removed in 1950 and from 1954 the building was used as a scout hall.

Until 1923 the water supply came from springs in Waipa Esplanade and Market Street. In April 1923 a reticulation scheme was opened, supplied by a dam on the Quarry Creek (now Mangarata Stream), 3/4 mile (1.2 km) away, in the Hakarimatas. The concrete dam is 100 feet (30 m) long and 26 feet (7.9 m) high and now accessible by the Waterworks Walk from Brownlee Avenue, alongside Mangarata Stream. The population was then 1100 in 240 houses. By 1965 the population was 3,630, so water was instead pumped from the Waikato and from a deep bore, with a new reservoir and water treatment plant opened in 1965.

Hopuhopu army camp was built on the Hopuhopu mission site in the 1920s, including its own water supply, ammunition dumps and a railway siding. A 1925 photograph showed only one building and many tents. A 1955 aerial photo showed the extent of building, which was largely complete by 1927. In 1993 the camp was returned to Waikato-Tainui, who converted it to their headquarters and Waikato-Tainui College for Research and Development.

Officers from the United States visited Ngāruawāhia during World War II and would share food at hāngī. Queen Elizabeth II visited Ngāruawāhia on two occasions (in 1953 and 1974). On the latter occasion, Māori Queen Dame Te Ātairangikaahu and her husband Whatumoana Paki welcomed Elizabeth to the local marae.

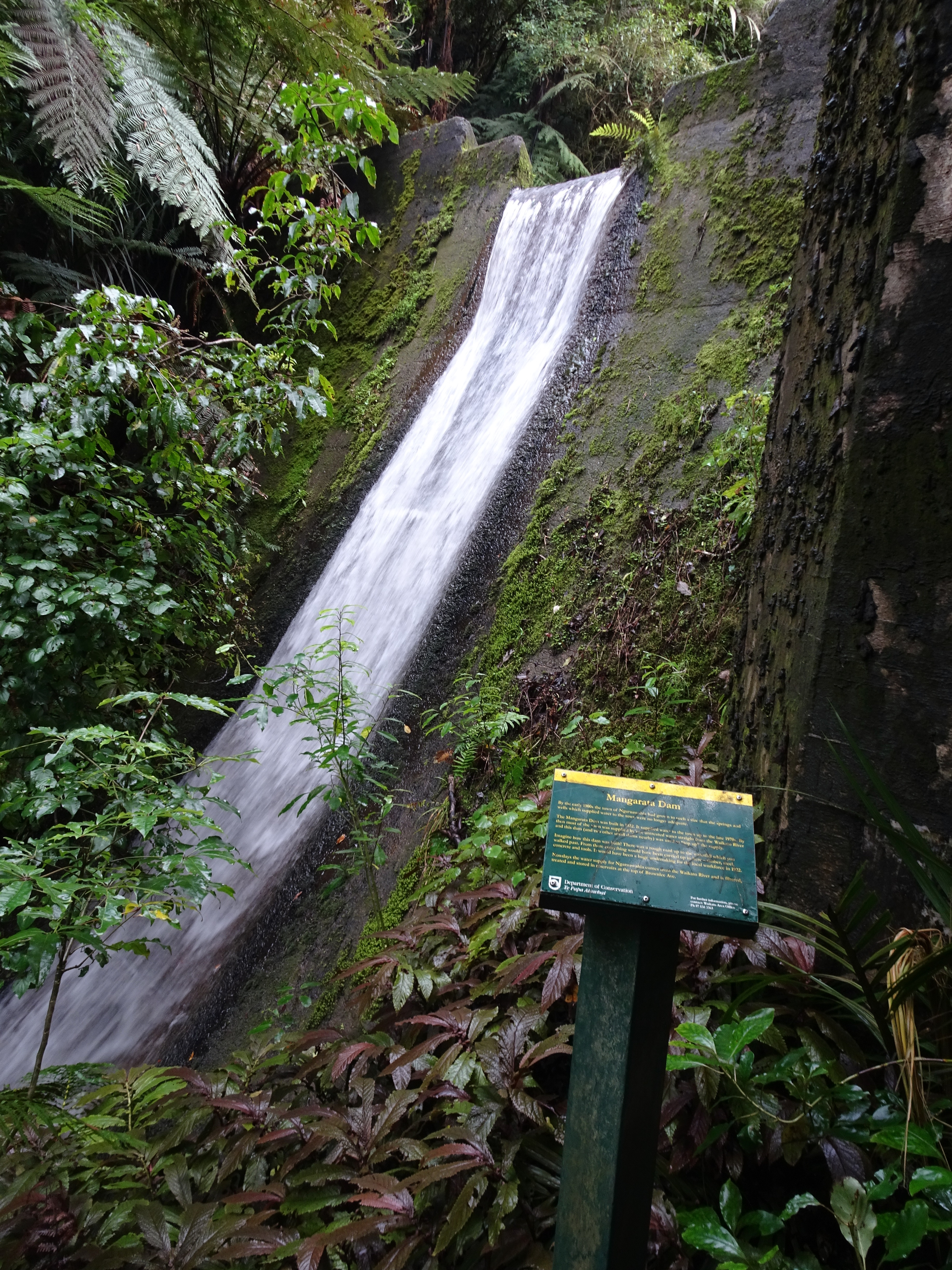
Mangarata Reservoir, Hakarimata

The Great Ngaruawahia Music Festival was held in 1973, and featured many music acts, including some that went on to become internationally famous such as Black Sabbath and Split Enz. It was the first large outdoor music festival in New Zealand.

In 1980, Mayor Latta released a book about the history of the town titled 'Meeting of the Waters'.

In March 1998, a freight train derailed on the local North Island Main Trunk line's rail bridge across the Waikato River. The incident caused structural damage to the bridge. The bridge was mended by April 2001.

=== 21st century ===
In 2008, Ngāruawāhia set a world record for the largest haka. By 2010 the town had its own community news. In 2011, murals were installed for Ngāruawāhia's 150th anniversary in 2013.

In May 2016, Heather du Plessis-Allan (an NZME broadcaster) claimed that the "town is rotting". The broadcaster later accepted a challenge to visit the town and an article relating to the incident appeared on a Waikato Times front page. According to Waikato District Mayor Allan Sanson, du Plessis-Allan "really upset locals". In June 2016, local mayor Allan Sanson said du Plessis-Allan spent around three hours in the town, apologizing to residents.

In 2019, the name of the town was officially gazetted as "Ngāruawāhia".

=== River bridges ===
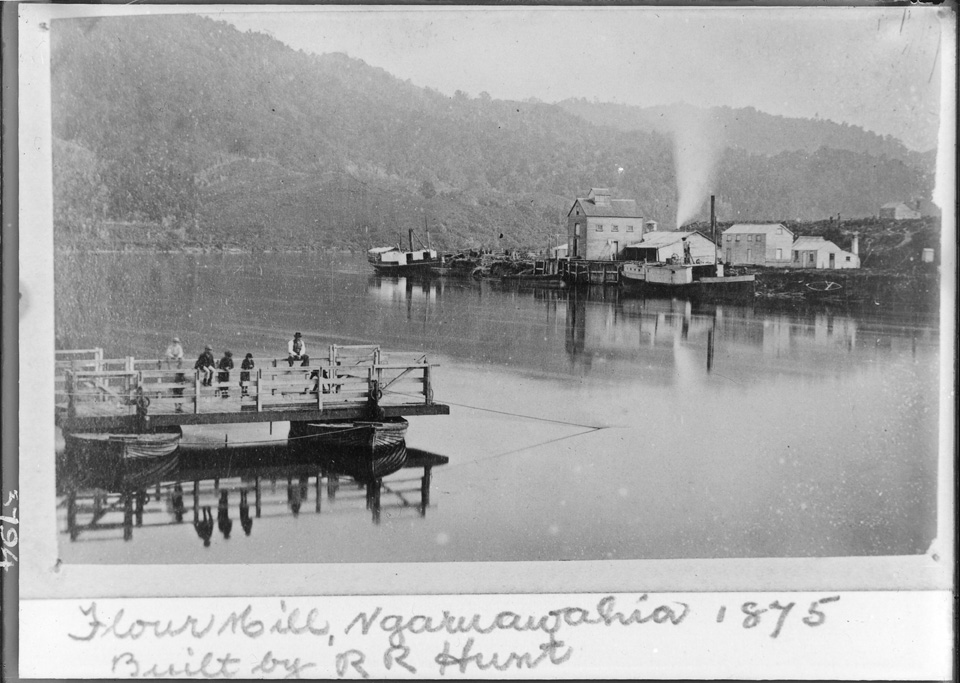
1875 punt, with Waikato Steam Navigation Company flour mill, paddle steamers Waipa and Bluenose and Hakarimata Range in the background

Until the Waikato invasion the rivers were the main transport routes, but, after the Great South Road and main trunk line were built, the rivers became barriers, which needed crossings.

As early as 1870 a public meeting called for a bridge, but a punt continued to be the main means of crossing the river until the road-rail bridge opened for traffic in 1876. So long as there were few trains, there was little complaint that gates closed 10 minutes before a train was due. However, by the 1900s road and rail traffic was increasing, averaging 20 trains, 275 pedestrians, 43 equestrians, 29 light vehicles, 18 milk carts, 6 wagons, and 55 stock a day in 1910.

A survey for a road bridge was done in 1911. Test borings for piles were done in 1912. The Ngāruawāhia Town Board and Waikato, Waipa, and Raglan County Councils agreed to share the cost in 1914. The State Advances office lent £2,500 for the bridge in 1915. Wartime shortages caused further delays, but by 1917 the new bridge was taking shape. Further delay occurred when additional piles had to be driven. The Minister reported the work well in hand in 1919, but then a temporary bridge, used in construction, was hit by a steamer. Work got under way again, £3,000 was in the Public Works Estimates and the bridge was reported complete in 1920, except for its approaches. The bridge opened in 1921 and, on 28 July 1921, was officially opened by the Minister of Public Works, J. G. Coates. It was 12 ft (3.7 m) wide and 436 ft (133 m) long, made up of 3 x 123 ft (37 m), a 43 ft (13 m) and a 20 ft (6.1 m) span. Two piers were in the river on 6 ft (1.8 m) concrete cylinders sunk 37 ft (11 m) below normal water-level. The others were reinforced concrete on concrete piling and the deck and trusses of Australian hardwood.

Complaints had been made about a single-lane bridge since before it was built, so, when the new NIMT bridge was built, the Main Highways Board leased the old one and added decking. The conversion was completed in early November 1931, allowing 2-way traffic. Single lane traffic was reinstated for a few months in 1936 to allow a 40 ft (12 m) truss on the 1921 bridge to be replaced. Traffic was still increasing. In 1935 traffic between Ohinewai and Ngāruawāhia averaged 660 vehicles a day. By 1938 it had risen to 1,329.

On 13 March 1953 a contract was let for a new steel truss bridge. An April 1955 photo shows two piers in the river. (Note: "Ngaruawahia, Waikato, view south to town at the confluence of the Waikato River with the Domain and bridge with Great South Road, and Waipā River with Waingar Road Bridge beyond".) On 20 August 1955 the centre span was placed and a 1955 photo shows the bridge almost finished. (Note: "Ngaruawahia road and rail bridges under construction over the Waikato River, Waikato Region".) The first car drove over the bridge on 19 October 1956. By 2008 17,392 vehicles a day were crossing the bridge. No more recent counts have been published, but, after the opening of the Taupiri link in 2013, traffic on the Great South Rd in Ngāruawāhia, was 12,467 in 2015, suggesting that traffic on the bridge has been reduced by about 5,000 vehicles a day.

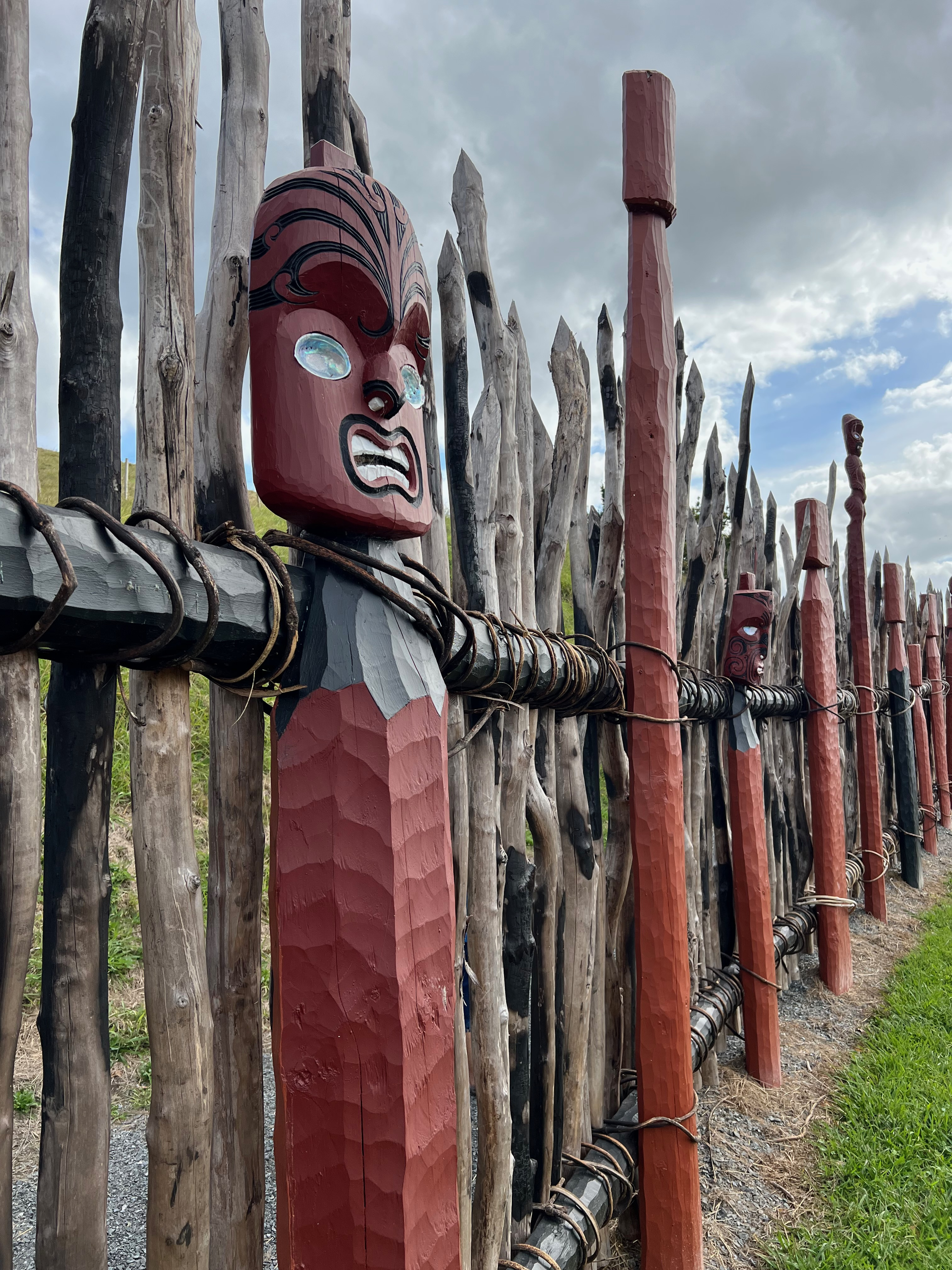
Figurehead at Puke i Āhua pā site

=== Listed buildings ===
Ngāruawāhia's history is reflected in the number of its Listed Buildings:

Category 1 Turangawaewae House built in 1912–1919 as Te Kauhanganui building in a fusion of Arts and Crafts and traditional Māori styles;

Category 2 – Band Rotunda, Delta Tavern, Doctor's House, former bakery, former Flourmill Store, former Māori pā – Puke i Ahua, Grant's Chambers, 13 Lower Waikato Esplanade, 2 Old Taupiri Rd, Pioneer Gun Turret, Riverdale, St Paul's Church, War Memorial.

== Demographics ==
Ngāruawāhia covers 11.86 km^{2} (4.58 sq mi) and had an estimated population of 8,570 as of June 2025, with a population density of 723 people per km^{2}.

Historical population
Year	Pop.	±% p.a.
2006	5,334	—
2013	5,682	+0.91%
2018	6,987	+4.22%
2023	7,992	+2.72%
The 2006 population is for a smaller area of 9.42 km^{2}. Source:

Ngāruawāhia had a population of 7,992 in the 2023 New Zealand census, an increase of 1,005 people (14.4%) since the 2018 census, and an increase of 2,310 people (40.7%) since the 2013 census. There were 3,951 males, 4,020 females and 21 people of other genders in 2,442 dwellings. 2.6% of people identified as LGBTIQ+. The median age was 31.7 years (compared with 38.1 years nationally). There were 2,022 people (25.3%) aged under 15 years, 1,707 (21.4%) aged 15 to 29, 3,489 (43.7%) aged 30 to 64, and 774 (9.7%) aged 65 or older.

People could identify as more than one ethnicity. The results were 55.4% European (Pākehā); 54.0% Māori; 6.4% Pasifika; 7.0% Asian; 0.9% Middle Eastern, Latin American and African New Zealanders (MELAA); and 1.6% other, which includes people giving their ethnicity as "New Zealander". English was spoken by 95.4%, Māori language by 17.8%, Samoan by 0.5%, and other languages by 7.1%. No language could be spoken by 3.0% (e.g. too young to talk). New Zealand Sign Language was known by 0.6%. The percentage of people born overseas was 12.7, compared with 28.8% nationally.

Religious affiliations were 28.1% Christian, 1.5% Hindu, 0.4% Islam, 4.9% Māori religious beliefs, 0.3% Buddhist, 0.5% New Age, and 1.4% other religions. People who answered that they had no religion were 56.3%, and 6.9% of people did not answer the census question.

Of those at least 15 years old, 936 (15.7%) people had a bachelor's or higher degree, 3,498 (58.6%) had a post-high school certificate or diploma, and 1,536 (25.7%) people exclusively held high school qualifications. The median income was $44,700, compared with $41,500 nationally. 456 people (7.6%) earned over $100,000 compared to 12.1% nationally. The employment status of those at least 15 was that 3,387 (56.7%) people were employed full-time, 651 (10.9%) were part-time, and 306 (5.1%) were unemployed.

Individual statistical areas
Name	Area (km^{2})	Population	Density (per km^{2})	Dwellings	Median age	Median income
Ngāruawāhia North	2.92	2,634	902	777	31.2 years	$45,000
Ngāruawāhia Central	3.85	3,297	856	1,038	32.2 years	$43,500
Ngāruawāhia South	5.10	2,058	404	627	31.7 years	$46,400
New Zealand					38.1 years	$41,500

== Community ==
=== Māori society ===
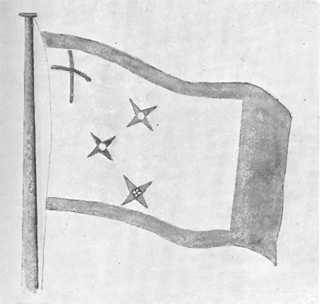
The flag hoisted at Ngāruawāhia on the proclamation of Pōtatau Te Wherowhero as the first Māori king, drawn 1863

Ngāruawāhia is home to the Māori King movement. The first king, Pōtatau Te Wherowhero, was crowned at Ngāruawāhia in 1858 and was living there when he died two years later. The current Māori queen is Nga wai hono i te po; she acceded to the throne at Tūrangawaewae Marae following the death of her father in 2024. A Bible is traditionally used during the crowning of a Māori monarch.

Ngāruawāhia has two marae affiliated with the Waikato Tainui hapū of Ngāti Mahuta and Ngāti Te Weehi: Tūrangawaewae and its Mahinaarangi or Turongo meeting house, and Waikeri-Tangirau Marae.

=== Christianity ===
On the northern side of the Waipā River is the Christian Youth Camps (CYC), the largest youth camp site in New Zealand. CYC started in the early 1960s with large Easter conventions. Today there are two separate camp sites on 38 hectares of land. The camp offers school holiday camps throughout the year. During the terms, the camps are used by various groups, including schools, churches and sporting organisations.

In 1995, the Holy Trinity Anglican Church burned down, and a new church had been built in its place by 1998.

=== Tribal Huk gang ===
A local gang is Tribal Huk, who have been seen as heroes by the community for providing lunches to schoolchildren in Ngāruawāhia, Hamilton and Huntly. In particular, they have been known for making sandwiches, which earned them the nickname "Sandwich Gang".

In October 2016, Tribal Huk president Jamie Pink started a movement against methamphetamine, known in New Zealand as "P". Waikato District Mayor Allan Sanson supported Pink's message to Ngāruawāhia methamphetamine dealers to either leave the town within 24 hours or "visits" would begin. The demand was also supported by members of the community who had gathered at a local meeting. According to a gang source, Ngāruawāhia became P free, but the Police Association stated that there was no evidence that P dealers had left Ngāruawāhia. There is additionally concern Pink has damaged the work that Tribal Huk did feeding a thousand Waikato schoolchildren. In November 2016, another community meeting was held. Pink was not present.

=== Sport and recreation ===
The town has two rugby league clubs. Turangawaewae Rugby League Club is named after the marae opposite its clubrooms. The Ngaruawahia Rugby League Club's team is the Ngaruawahia Panthers. Ngaruawahia RLC is the oldest such club in the Waikato. Early games were played at various venues, such as Taupiri paddock and Paterson Park. The first major match for the town was held in August 1911 when they lost to Auckland 22 – 36 at the Caledonian Ground in Frankton. Ngaruawahia beat Hamilton United 27 – 4 in the first ever Northern Union game to be played at Hamilton's Steele Park in 1912. The senior team were Champion of Champions in 1956 and 1957.

The local football (soccer) club is Ngaruawahia United, known as "The Green Machine", founded in 1968. Centennial Park is the home ground for the club, and has been the home venue for ASB Premiership side Waikato FC in past seasons.

The local regatta has been a fundamental event for the region for well over a century. An event is held every year in March on the Waikato River. The first regatta was an unofficial event in 1892, involving both Māori and Pākehā festivities. The regatta provided a means of association between two ethnic groups, socially and culturally. The first official regatta took place in 1896 and since then has grown to become one of New Zealand's largest aquatic festivals. During the centennial regatta in March 1996, over 48,000 people visited the town to see thousands of performers from a number of countries.

For many years, jumping off the rail bridge has been a tradition. However, organisations such as KiwiRail want the practice to end.

== Education ==
Ngaruawahia High School is the town's co-educational state secondary school, with a roll of 356 as of July 2026. The school opened in 1963.

The town has two English-language state primary schools: Ngaruawahia School, with a roll of 175; and Waipa School, with a roll of 329. Ngaruawahia School opened in 1886, with origins from 1869, and Waipa School opened in 1957.

St Paul's Catholic School is a co-educational state-integrated primary school, with a roll of 115. St Paul's opened in 1928.

Te Kura Kaupapa Māori o Bernard Fergusson is a co-educational Māori-language state primary school, with a roll of 170. It opened as Bernard Fergusson School in 1965.

== Former residents ==
- Kelvin Cruickshank, television personality
- Martin Donnelly, cricketer
- Shaun Kenny-Dowall, rugby league player
- Leonard Manning, UN peacekeeper
- Inia Te Wiata, operatic singer and traditional carver
- Richard Tomlinson, MI6 officer
- Dallin Watene-Zelezniak, rugby league player
- Allan Wilson, biochemist
- Stacey Gregg, children's author, screenwriter and former fashion journalist

== See also ==
- Ngaruawahia Railway Station
- Glen Massey Line
