= Tūrangawaewae =

Sacred Māori place in Waikato, New Zealand

- Marae
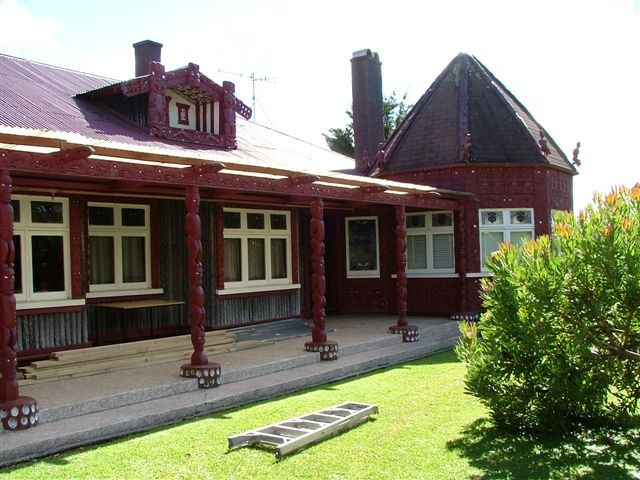
- Tūrongo House, one of the main buildings

- Location within New Zealand
- Coordinates: 37°39′48″S 175°09′13″E
- Location: 29 River Road, Ngāruawāhia, New Zealand
- Opened: 1929 (Māhinārangi)
- Website: waikatotainui.com/marae/tuurangawaewae/

Tūrangawaewae (Māori: [tʉːɾaŋawaewae]) is a marae and a royal residence in Ngāruawāhia, Waikato, New Zealand. It is the official residence of the Māori monarch and the administrative headquarters of the Kīngitanga movement. Of its numerous buildings, the two principal ones are the Māhinārangi meeting house, and Tūrongo House, which is official residence of the queen or king.

Māhinārangi and Tūrongo are made of wood and are covered in complex Māori carvings (whakairo), painted burgundy and cream. Over the years, it has undergone renovations, in harmony with the original style, which represents a unique synthesis of classical Māori and Edwardian architecture. For its 2012 renovations, Tūrangawaewae was awarded the New Zealand Institute of Architects' Waikato-Bay of Plenty Regional Award in the Heritage Category.

== Buildings and history ==
Ngāti Tamaoho hapū under the leadership of Princess Te Puea Hērangi began by clearing swampy land overgrown with scrub and blackberry vines, including an area that had been used recently as a rubbish dump in August 1921. The name Tūrangawaewae means a place to stand.

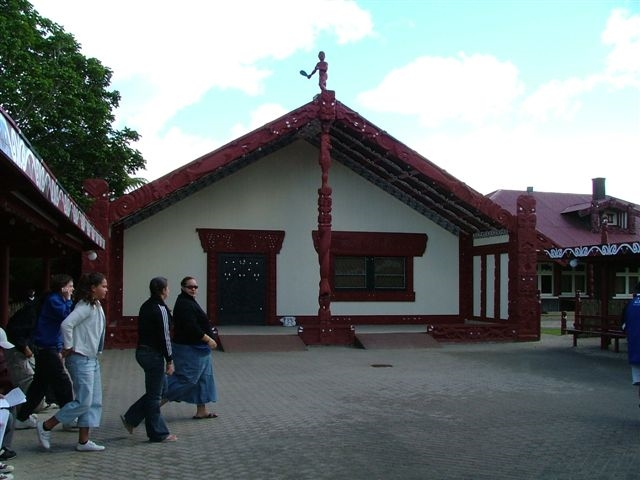
Māhinārangi meeting house

The marae's buildings include the carved Māhinārangi meeting house, built in 1929, and next to it, Tūrongo House, the Māori King or Queen's official residence, built in 1938. The two houses are named after Māhinārangi, an East Coast "princess", and her husband Tūrongo, a Tainui chief. The link this marriage formed between the two tribal regions was highlighted by Sir Āpirana Ngata when Te Puea was debating a name for the house. Ngata and his tribe, Ngāti Porou, had contributed thousands of pounds in funding by supporting performances by Te Puea's concert party when it travelled the East Coast region. In addition he sent expert carvers and weavers to assist with the construction of the building. To commemorate this he asked that the meeting house be named after the East Coast ancestress to salute the ancient link and the modern day koha (gift) Ngāti Porou had provided.

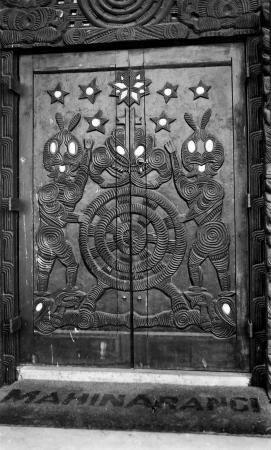
Doors of Māhinārangi

The death and suffering of local Māori caused by the 1918 flu pandemic still remained fresh in the memory of Tūrangawaewae residents and Te Puea's original vision for Māhinārangi was to be a hospital for the Māori community so they could receive treatment in a traditional manner. However the Ministry of Health would not grant the necessary permits for it to be used this way. Thus the building was made into a reception hall of sorts and has hosted many foreign dignitaries. A visiting New Zealand prime minister commented at the conclusion of a visit with King Korokī that the house was a fine sitting room for a king. This comment gave Te Puea an idea: what use is a sitting room if there is no house to entertain visiting guests properly?

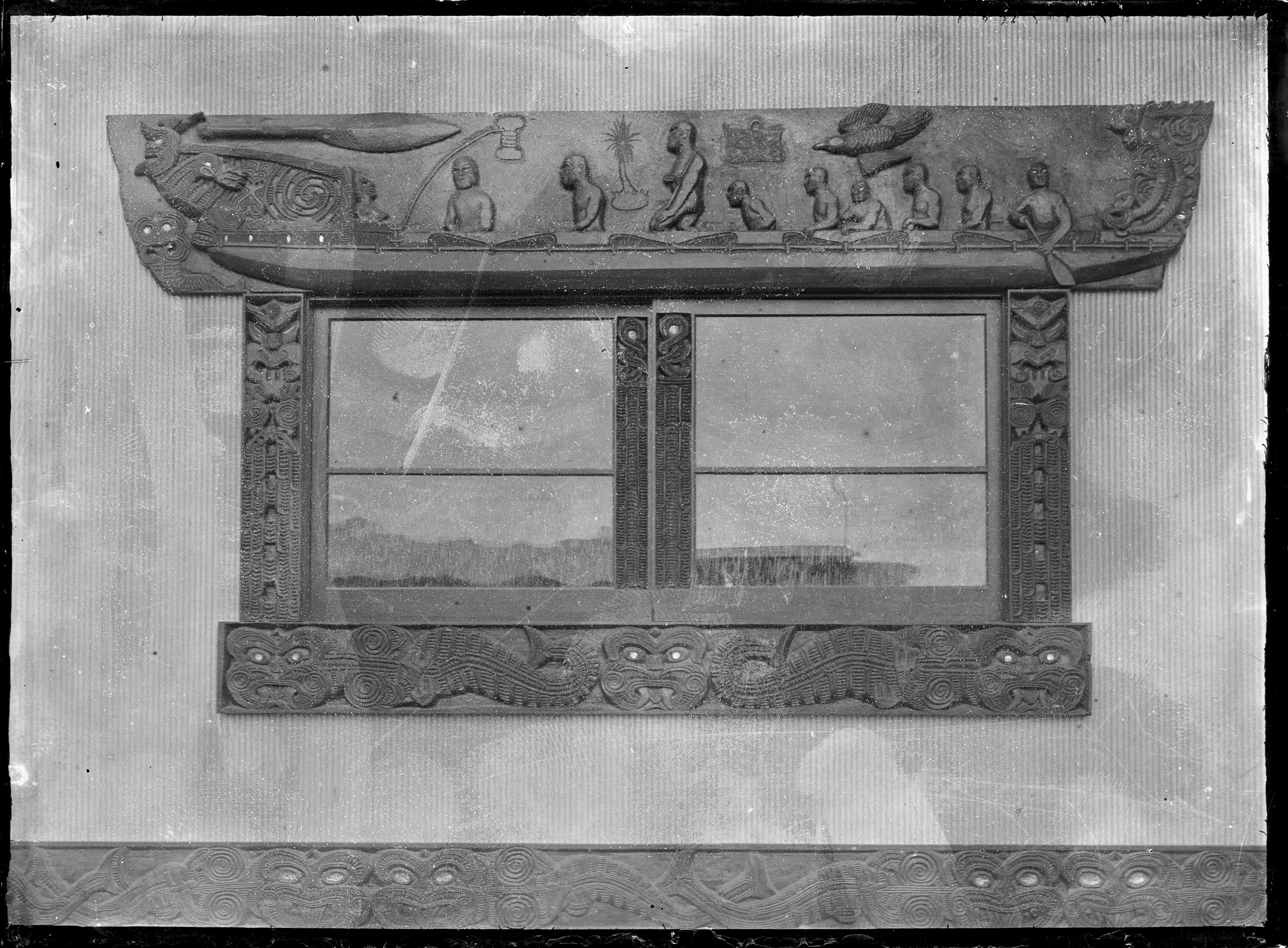
The korupe (carving over the window frame) of Māhinārangi house showing the Tainui canoe (ca. 1350) with its captain Hoturoa. Above the canoe is Te Hoe-o-Tainui, a famous paddle, the kete (kit) given to Whakaoterangi by a tohunga of Hawaiki, the bird Parakaraka (front) who was able to see in the dark, and another bird who warned of approaching daylight.

Thus Tūrongo house was born. This exquisitely carved home was the brainchild of Te Puea. Having noticed a home in Hamilton with a hexagonal tower in the corner she came up with a blueprint that incorporated both Māori and European architectural styles. The house's interior and exterior surfaces have been carved extensively and have incorporated many symbols important to the Kīngitanga movement. A seven-sided tower in the corner represents the seven initial waka that, according to tradition, brought the Māori people to their new home of Aotearoa. It also has some unique features such as untreated ponga log cladding on the exterior walls. There are also two pātaka (store houses) acting as dormer windows on the roof and storing important taonga (treasures) of the Kīngitanga. Each one represents the Māori and Pākehā influence on the local people. The modern day house contains magnificent reception rooms, dining rooms and kitchens that are suitable for the Arikinui to host guests in a distinctly Māori fashion.

Some of Te Puea's main goals for the movement were to increase the mana or prestige of the Kīngitanga and its figurehead the Arikinui by:

1. Raising the standards of health, housing and employment of the people
2. Establishing a national marae complex at Ngāruawāhia (Tūrangawaewae Marae) that would be a centre of Māori culture and politics, thus creating a strong sense of community, pride and more importantly, mana amongst the Kīngitanga.

== Modern use ==
Tūrangawaewae, along with the Kīngitanga movement and the office of the Arikinui, has become a key institution to showcase Māoridom not only in New Zealand but the world. World leaders including Nelson Mandela, Queen Elizabeth II and many of her children have paid courtesy visits to the Māori monarch and the people of the Kīngitanga.

Under the leadership of Te Puea strong relationships had been established with the Polynesian royal families of the Cook Islands, Samoa and Tonga. As a result, during the annual Koroneihana (coronation) festivities, representatives of the Polynesian royal houses including Queen Salote of Tonga and many of her descendants have made many visits and gifted highly prized taonga to the Arikinui, which are now housed in the dual pātaka of Tūrongo.

Tūrangawaewae Marae and its unique buildings are a physical representation of the determination of the Kīngitanga to not only survive the last 200 years of turmoil, but to prosper and flourish under the leadership of leaders like Te Puea and Te Arikinui Dame Te Atairangikaahu.

In 2012, architects Salmon Reid designed and oversaw a renovation of Māhinārangi and Tūrongo. The project included a kitchen upgrade and the addition of new food preparation and taonga storage buildings. Exterior cladding of ponga trunks and weatherboards was removed temporarily for structural strengthening. Modern utilities, such as a sprinkler system, were retrofitted while keeping changes in harmony with the heritage values of the buildings. The project was awarded the New Zealand Institute of Architects' Waikato-Bay of Plenty Regional Award in the Heritage Category. In October 2020, the Government committed $370,730 from the Provincial Growth Fund to upgrade the marae, creating 30 jobs.
