= June Mariu =

New Zealand Māori community leader, educator and sportswoman (1932–2024)

Dame June Mariu DNZM QSM JP
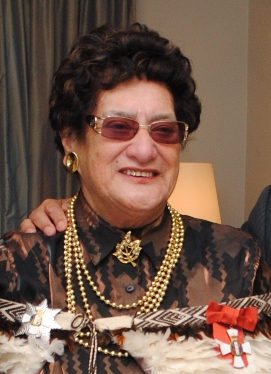
- Mariu in 2012

12th President of the Māori Women's Welfare League
- In office 1987–1990
- Preceded by: Dame Georgina Kirby
- Succeeded by: Dame Aroha Reriti-Crofts

Personal details
- Born: Mabel June Hinekahukura Waititi; 1 June 1932; Wharekahika / Hicks Bay, Aotearoa
- Died: 10 August 2024 (aged 92); Otamaroa, Bay of Plenty, Aotearoa
- Spouse: Joseph Mariu
- Children: 2
- Relatives: Hoani Waititi (uncle); Archbishop Brown Tūrei (uncle); Dame Iritana Tāwhiwhirangi (cousin); Kahurangi Waititi (cousin); Rawiri Waititi (nephew); Taika Waititi (nephew); Tweedie Waititi (niece); Rob Ruha (nephew)
- Education: Queen Victoria School for Māori Girls; Teachers' Training College
- Known for: Community Leader

Dame Mabel June Hinekahukura Mariu DNZM QSM JP (née Waititi, 1 June 1932 – 10 August 2024), known by most as "Aunty June" or "Mrs. M", was a New Zealand Māori community leader, teacher, sportswoman and served as a Justice of the Peace for many years before retiring.

Mariu represented Aotearoa in two sporting codes. As a netball stalwart she was the first winning captain of the national team (now known as the Silver Ferns) in 1960. She also represented New Zealand in indoor basketball. She also played softball regionally for Auckland and North Island teams. Mariu was inducted into the Māori Sports Awards Hall of Fame in February 2014 joining many other notable Māori sports people like Dame Ruia Morrison.

Between 1987 and 1990, she served as national president of the Māori Women's Welfare League. Mariu was appointed a member of the Treaty of Waitangi Fisheries Commission in 2000 by Parekura Horomia.

In the 1985 Queen's Birthday Honours, Mariu was awarded the Queen's Service Medal for public services. In the 2006 New Year Honours, she was appointed a Companion of the New Zealand Order of Merit, for services to Māori and the community, and in 2012 she was promoted to Dame Companion of the New Zealand Order of Merit presented by Sir Jerry Mateparae, also for services to Māori and the community. She continued to inspire many people from the grassroots up.

Mariu had strong ties with the Kiingitanga Movement through the first Māori Queen, Te Arikinui Dame Te Ātairangikaahu, as well as through her iwi of Te Whānau a Apanui. She later became a member of the Tekau-Ma-Rua, a group of representatives from across the country chosen by the Māori king Te Arikinui Kiingi Tūheitia.

Mariu was chosen to serve as the first patron to New Zealand's largest Māori public health body, Hāpai Te Hauora Tapui back in 2014. She had the honour of being officially appointed by King Tūheitia. Mariu was the representative for Hapai Te Hauora. Her relation Dame Iritana Tāwhiwhirangi is also currently in this group as a companion member due to her work for Māori language revival.

June Mariu supported Te Pāti Māori from its inception, including giving her support to the former ministers and co-leaders Dame Tariana Turia, Sir Pita Sharples and Te Ururoa Flavell.

== Personal life ==
Mariu was born in Wharekahika on 1 June 1932. Her mother was Dorothy Waititi (née Tihore) of Ngāti Porou at Wharekahika, and her father was Manihera Waititi (older brother to Hoani Waititi) of Te Whānau-ā-Apanui at Cape Runaway. Mariu spent her first few years living in Wharekahika with her maternal grandparents. Her grandfather Patihana Tihore was of Ngāti Porou, and Alice Tihore (née Gill) of Yorkshire, England, was her grandmother. When her grandmother died in 1937, Mariu and her grandfather left Wharekahika to stay with her parents and younger brothers, Arthur and Winston (father of Rawiri), at Otamaroa, Cape Runaway. Mariu's hapū are Te Whānau a Kauaetangohia (Cape Runaway) and Te Whānau a Tūwhakairiora (Wharekahika).

Mariu left her East Coast homeland at the age of thirteen to attend Queen Victoria School for Māori Girls, a boarding school facilitated by the Anglican Church, in Parnell, Auckland. After high school, Mariu went on to a sporting career before settling down in West Auckland as a teacher and later a community leader.

June married Joseph Mariu of Ngāti Tūwharetoa and Ngāti Raukawa ki te Tonga at the historical church in Raukokore in 1961. Joseph Mariu was a relative of Max Mariu, the Catholic Auxiliary Bishop of Hamilton. The two settled in Te Atatū North (now Te Atatū Peninsula) in West Auckland amongst many other Māori who left their rural homelands for an urban setting. In 1962, June and Joseph had their first daughter Alice Mariu. Three years later in 1965 their second daughter Jonyne Mariu was born. She was named after June's uncle, well known educator Hoani Waititi.

Mariu still lived in Te Atatū Peninsula with her daughters Alice and Jonyne, and three grandchildren. She died on 10 August 2024, at the age of 92.

== Sports ==
=== Netball ===
"June Mariu’s selection as the 22nd Silver Fern had historical significance for the New Zealand team. With the first team to be selected since 1948, the 1960 edition proved the turning point for Netball in New Zealand and with it, the start of the modern era for the sport in this country.

Playing under the recently-adopted international rules of seven-a-side, the 1960 Silver Ferns set off across the Tasman for a 15-game tour 22 years after their historic first-ever Test against Australia.

Elevated from the Auckland provincial team, shooter Mariu, 28, was named the Silver Ferns fifth captain and entrusted with leading a 10-strong team on their trailblazing mission.

It was the first national team to undertake a full scale tour, which included three Tests and 12 other games, the team from 1960 representing a new breed of player and laying the foundation for the game as we know it today.

Growing up in Hicks Bay on the East Coast, she was a natural athlete from early on and, as well as Netball, went on to become a national softball and indoor basketball representative.

Well suited to the playmaking role of goal attack, she had the distinction of becoming New Zealand’s first winning captain when the Silver Ferns prevailed 49-40 in the first Test, on the grass centre tennis court in Adelaide.

In mirroring the trans-Tasman rivalry that has long since continued, they lost the second Test in Melbourne 44-39 and suffered a heart-breaking 46-45 loss in the final Test.

On returning home, she married and retired from international Netball but her passion remained strong and she moved into coaching at school, Club and provincial level with great success while also becoming a Silver Ferns selector."

After her playing years she was appointed Auckland Netball coach where she masterminded the effective playing strategy of full court zone defence that led her team to National Championship titles and can still be seen today to full effect in international netball play.

Mariu coached some notable players over the years like Yvonne Willering and Te Aroha Keenan.

June always dreamt that one day New Zealand would finally have Māori Netball teams playing on a world stage, similar to the Māori All Blacks in rugby. She always believed that "We are two nations, one country" in accordance to Tiriti o Waitangi.

=== Indoor Basketball ===
Mariu represented the country in Indoor Basketball.

=== Softball ===
Mariu was a North Island Softball representative between 1956 and 1957.

== Māori Women's Welfare League ==
June Mariu served as the 12th National President of the Māori Women's Welfare League from 1987 until 1990. Her predecessor was the late Dame Georgina Kirby, who started the Māori Women's Development Initiative (MWDI), and her successor was the late Dame Aroha Reriti-Crofts.

In 1987, following the publication of "Rapuora - Health and Māori Women" by past president Dr Erihapeti Rehu-Murchie, a partnership proposal based on Healthy Lifestyles for the prevention of cardio-vascular disease among Māori was accepted by the then Department of Health. Mariu led the initiative as her commitment to making a healthy lifestyle difference for Māori women and their families using netball as the vehicle of change. Thus the beginning of Aotearoa Māori Netball Oranga Healthy Lifestyle (AMNOHL) in 1988. For many years she was the National Coordinator of Aotearoa Māori Netball. Through AMNOHL, Aotearoa has seen some of the best Māori players on the international stage. Players like Waimarama Taumaunu, Dame Noeline Taurua, Jenny-May Clarkson, and Temepara Bailey.

Mariu was the president of the Te Atatu Branch for fifteen years and Regional Secretary of the Tāmaki Makaurau Region for two years.

Both the MWDI and AMNOHL are two of the leagues most important assets, and still run to this day.

Other notable Past Presidents of the Māori Women's Welfare League are: Dame Whina Cooper (Founding President), Dame Mira Szászy, Dame Georgina Kirby, Dame Aroha Reriti-Crofts and Dame Areta Koopu.

Patrons of the Māori Women's Welfare League include: Te Ariki Te Puea Herangi (Princess; Founding Patroness), followed by Te Arikinui Dame Te Atairangikaahu (Māori Queen), and the current patron is Makau Ariki Atawhai Paki (Wife of Kiingi Tuheitia). All are representatives of Te Kiingitanga.

== West Auckland ==
In her time in West Auckland, Mariu taught at many schools before finally settling at Rutherford High School (now Rutherford College) in Te Atatū Peninsula. She originally taught health and physical education before being asked to take on Te Reo Māori instead. Some famous past students of her classes include actor and comedian Pio Terei, Governor-General Dame Cindy Kiro, and through her community ties include rugby player Te Kura Ngata-Aerengamate. Mariu was integral in establishing one of the first mainstream school marae at Rutherford College, Te Kotuku Marae, as well as one of the first Te Reo Māori classes in a mainstream school in Aotearoa.

Alongside many others, Mariu helped strengthen Te Reo Māori and Te Ao Māori in her community.

Mariu was the founding chairwoman for the Te Whānau o Waipareira Trust, of which she was an Honorary Board Member.

She also had strong ties to the Hoani Waititi Marae in Glen Eden alongside the likes of Sir Pita Sharples. The marae was named after her late uncle. Hoani Waititi is the proud home of a Kōhanga Reo, the very first Kura Kaupapa Māori in Aotearoa, and the very first Wharekura in Aotearoa as well. Before retirement, she spent her last working days as a lay advocate helping youth in the justice space at Hoani Waititi Marae. Namely the Te Kooti Rangatahi / Youth Courts. Her nephew Kawana Waititi carved a pou for the marae.

Mariu had some notable past and present members of parliament as her neighbours and whānau: The Hon. Tau Henare, Tukuroirangi Morgan and The Hon. John Tamihere.

Her nephew Rawiri Waititi is the current co-leader of Te Pāti Māori. A former member of parliament and minister of the crown Tuariki Delamere is from the same iwi as Mariu, Te Whanau a Apanui.

During her time living in Auckland, Mariu also had connections with Dame Naida Glavish as mana whenua, Ngāti Whātua Ōrākei.
