= Waititi =

Waititi (/ˈwaɪtɪti/ WY-tee-tee) is a Māori surname from New Zealand. Notable people with the surname include:

- Hoani Waititi (1926–1965), New Zealand educator
- Kahurangi Waititi (born 1982), New Zealand netball player
- Rawiri Waititi (born 1980 or 1981), New Zealand politician
- Taika Waititi (born 1975), New Zealand film director
- Tweedie Waititi (born c. 1985), New Zealand film director and producer
