= Te Aritaua Pītama =

Te Aritaua Pītama (23 February 1906 – 14 March 1958) was a New Zealand teacher, broadcaster and concert party producer. Of Māori descent, he identified with the Ngāi Tahu iwi. He was born in Tuahiwi, Canterbury, New Zealand, in 1906.
