= Aroha Reriti-Crofts =

New Zealand community worker (1938–2022)

Dame Aroha Reriti-Crofts DNZM CBE JP
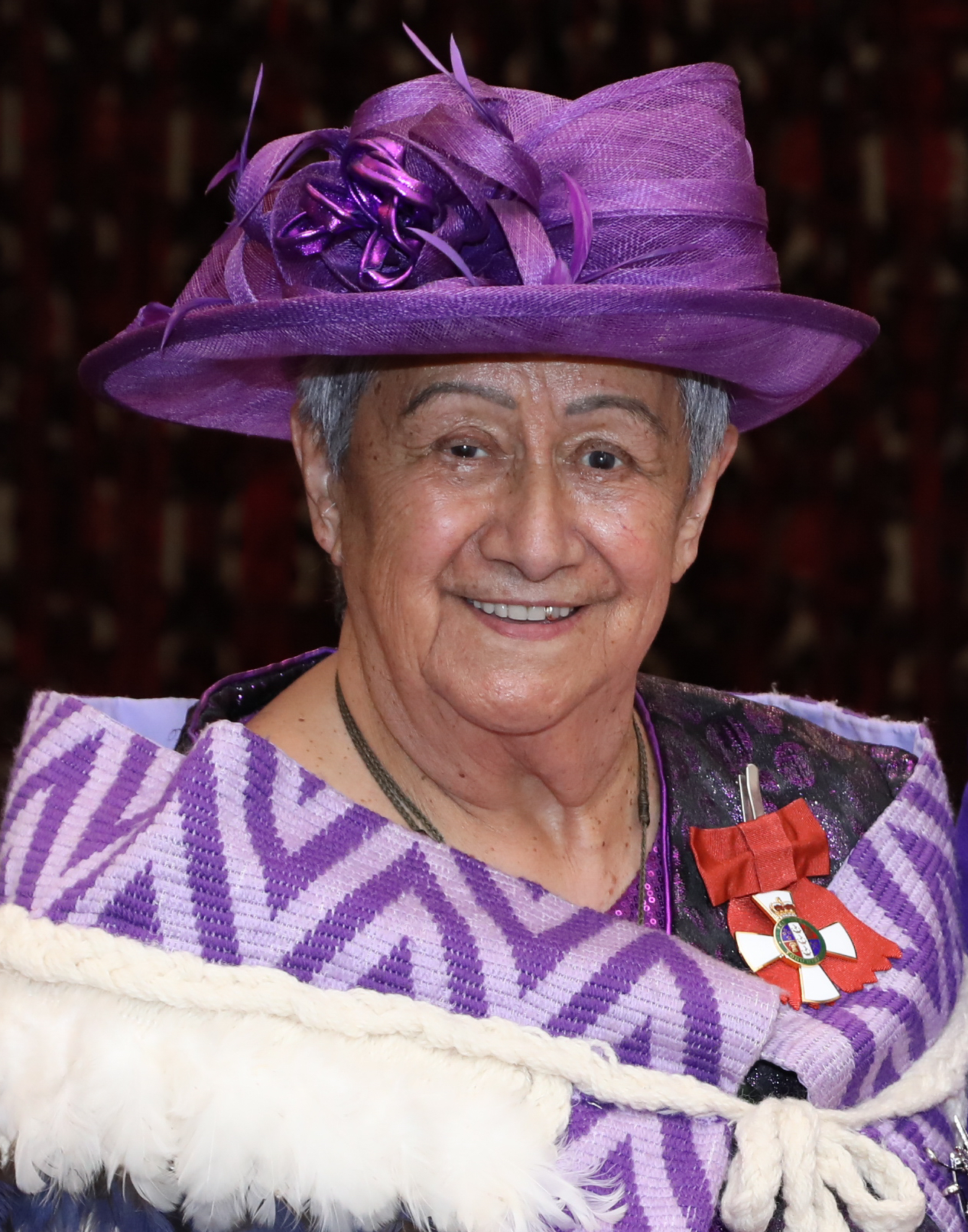
- Reriti-Crofts in 2020

13th President of the Māori Women's Welfare League
- In office 1990–1993
- Preceded by: June Mariu
- Succeeded by: Areta Koopu

Personal details
- Born: Aroha Hōhipera Crofts; 28 August 1938; Tuahiwi, New Zealand
- Died: 20 May 2022 (aged 83); Christchurch, New Zealand
- Political party: Māori Party
- Spouse: Peter Reriti
- Children: 4

Dame Aroha Hōhipera Reriti-Crofts DNZM CBE JP (née Crofts; 28 August 1938 – 20 May 2022) was a New Zealand community worker who was national president of the Māori Women’s Welfare League.

== Biography ==
Reriti-Crofts was born Aroha Hōhipera Crofts at Tuahiwi on 28 August 1938, the daughter of Metapere Ngawini Crofts (née Barrett) and Edward Teoreohua Crofts. Of Māori descent, she affiliated to Ngāi Tahu, and was educated at Te Waipounamu Maori Girls' College in Christchurch. She married Peter Reriti, and the couple had four children.

From 1978 to 1979, Reriti-Crofts returned to study as an adult student at Aranui High School in Christchurch, and went on to complete a teaching diploma at Christchurch Teachers' College in 1983.

Reriti-Crofts died in Christchurch on 20 May 2022, aged 83 years.

== Community activities ==
From the age of seven, Reriti-Crofts was involved in kapa haka: she was co-tutor of the Māori cultural performance group at the 1974 British Commonwealth Games in Christchurch and was head tutor of a similar group at the 1975 New Zealand Games, also held in Christchurch. She set a world endurance record for a poi performance at 30 hours 19 minutes.

Reriti-Crofts joined the Ōtautahi Māori Women’s Welfare League in 1968 and served as secretary of the branch in the 1970s. In 1990, she was elected national president. Her involvement in other community organisations included serving as a trustee of Te Puawaitanga ki Ōtautahi Trust, the Māori Women’s Development Incorporated, Mana Waitaha Charitable Trust and Maori Reserve Lands: Tuahiwi/North Canterbury, She was a kaiwhakamana of the Department of Corrections and chairperson of Matapopore – Tūāhuriri Rūnanga. She was particularly involved with health initiatives in Māori communities, such as Tamariki Ora (well-child), Rapuora (mobile nursing service), outreach immunisation, flu vaccinations for older people and breastfeeding advocacy.

At the 2014 and 2017 general elections, Reriti-Crofts unsuccessfully contested in the Waimakariri electorate representing the Māori Party.

== Honours and awards ==
In 1972, Reriti-Crofts was named as Young Māori Woman of the Year. In 1977, she was awarded the Queen Elizabeth II Silver Jubilee Medal, and in 1993 she received the New Zealand Suffrage Centennial Medal.

In the 1993 New Year Honours, Reriti-Crofts was appointed a Commander of the Order of the British Empire, for services to Māori and the community. In 2016, she was a runner-up for the Māori/Pacific Health Volunteer Award from the New Zealand Ministry of Health. In the 2020 Queen's Birthday Honours, she was appointed a Dame Companion of the New Zealand Order of Merit, for services to Māori and the community.
