= Georgina Kirby =

New Zealand Māori leader (1936–2021)

Dame Georgina Kirby DBE QSO JP
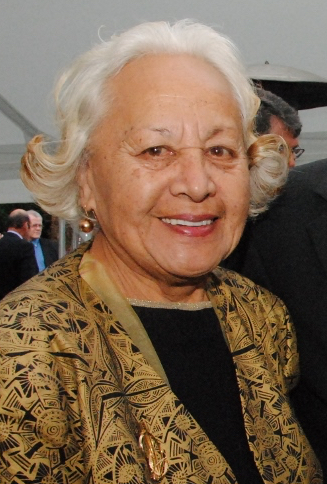
- Kirby in 2013

11th President of the Māori Women's Welfare League
- In office 1983–1987
- Preceded by: Maraea Te Kawa
- Succeeded by: June Mariu

Personal details
- Born: 31 January 1936 Horohoro, New Zealand
- Died: 11 June 2021 (aged 85) Auckland, New Zealand

Dame Georgina Kamiria Kirby DBE QSO JP (31 January 1936 – 11 June 2021) was a New Zealand Māori leader and women's advocate.

== Background ==
Kirby was born in 1936 at Horohoro, near Rotorua, the eldest of 11 children of a farming family. She was a member of the Ngāti Kahungunu iwi. She attended Horohoro School, Rotorua High School, and the University of Auckland. She had a number of jobs in the 1950s and 1960s including being a junior assistant teacher at Whakarewarewa School from 1953 to 1954, a toll operator from 1955 to 1956, and a training officer from 1956 to 1963 with the New Zealand Post Office.

In 1977 she went abroad to study arts administration at the National Arts School in Papua New Guinea and the Aboriginal Arts Board in Sydney, Australia.

== Career ==
Kirby was connected with many organisations and events throughout her career. She was a strong advocate for Māori economic and arts development. She helped establish the Te Taumata Art Gallery in Auckland. She was a member of the Māori Women's Welfare League from 1976 and was president from 1983 to 1987. During her tenure, she launched health campaigns such as smoking cessation and obesity reduction.

Kirby formed Māori Women's Development Incorporated to help Māori women who could not obtain loan grants. She wrote the curriculum herself, and gave it out to women around the country in her numerous roadshows. In 1993, along with Marilyn Waring and Jocelyn Fish, Kirby introduced the concept of gender representation in Parliament. The same year, she and 15 other leaders filed the Mana Wāhine Inquiry claim before the Waitangi Tribunal.

Kirby died in Auckland on 11 June 2021, aged 85.

=== Organisations ===
The following list includes some of the organisations that Kirby was connected with:

- Māori Education Fund, trustee
- Te Kohanga Reo National Trust, trustee
- NZ Women's Refuge Foundation, trustee
- NZ Māori Artists and Writers’ Society Ngā Puna Waihanga, National Secretary 1973-84
- Te Manuka Film Trust in Wellington, trustee

== Honours and awards ==
In the 1989 New Year Honours, Kirby was appointed a Companion of the Queen's Service Order for community service. In 1993, she was awarded the New Zealand Suffrage Centennial Medal. In the 1994 Queen's Birthday Honours, she was appointed a Dame Commander of the Order of the British Empire, for services to the Māori people.
