= Erihapeti Rehu-Murchie =

Ngāi Tahu leader (1923–1997)

Erihapeti Rehu-Murchie CNZM QSO JP

8th President of the Māori Women's Welfare League
- In office 1977–1980
- Preceded by: Mira Szászy
- Succeeded by: Violet Pou

Human Rights Commissioner, Human Rights Commission
- In office 1988–1997

Personal details
- Born: Erihapeti Rehu; 30 December 1923 Arowhenua, New Zealand
- Died: 5 July 1997 (aged 73) Whanganui, New Zealand
- Spouse: Malcolm McGregor Murchie
- Relations: Erihana Ryan; Hana Te Hemara
- Children: 10
- Parent: Oriwia Hawea (Ngāti Ruakawa) John Piuraki Rehu (Ngāi Tahu)
- Education: Arowhenua Native School and Temuka District High School
- Alma mater: Teachers' Training College; University of Canterbury (BA); Victoria University of Wellington (LLD h.c)

Erihapeti Rehu-Murchie CNZM QSO JP (30 December 1923 – 5 July 1997) was a Ngāi Tahu leader, health researcher, actor, composer and human rights commissioner. She was president of the Māori Women's Welfare League from 1977 to 1980 and research director from 1981 to 1985.

== Personal life ==
Rehu-Murchie was born at Arowhenua, on 30 December 1923. She studied at Arowhenua Native School, and Temuka District High School. From 1944 to 1945, she studied at Christchurch Teachers’ College where she met and married Malcolm McGregor Murchie, a pākeha with whom she went on to have ten children.

== Work and activism ==
While working as a teacher she also acted and directed plays. She played Aroha Mataira in The Pohutukawa Tree by Bruce Mason.

In 1963, Rehu-Murchie joined the Māori Women's Welfare League. In the early 1970s, she supported the Māori Language Petition of her second cousin Hana Te Hemara. She also voiced the opposition of the league to All-Black tours to Apartheid South Africa.

In 1977, besides completing a Bachelor of Arts degree at Victoria University of Wellington, she became president of the Māori Women's Welfare League. Still in 1977, with the financial support of the Department of Māori Affairs, Rehu-Murchie started her research project on Māori women health, fundamentally based on the belief that it should be "about Māori people, by Māori people, for the benefit of Māori people". This project, focused on the Māori understanding of what it constituted good health, was groundbreaking in including the recognition of Māori traditional healing practices. Whetumarama Wereta (née Rolleston) was appointed as the research director of Rehu-Murchie's project for the first three years, resigning in 1981 following difficulties in making the draft questionnaire accessible to Māori women. Following a period of" "intense anxiety" about the future of the project, Rehu-Murchie became the league's research director from 1981 to 1985. After the redesign of the questionnaire and methodology change, Rehu-Murchie secured a substantial grant from the New Zealand Medical Research Council, which ensured the continuation of the project, eventually penning the landmark report Rapuora: Health and Māori Women, launched at a hui at Takapuwahia Marae in November of 1984.

In 1979, she publicly supported the student activism of Ngā Tamatoa in the controversy around the haka party incident and later opposed the 1981 Springbok Tour.

In 1988, she was appointed to the Human Rights Commission. She travelled to indigenous meetings under the UN and was an early proponent of the United Nations Declaration on the Rights of Indigenous People. She died on 5 July 1997.

== Honours ==
In the 1990 New Year Honours, Rehu-Murchie was appointed a Companion of the Queen's Service Order for community service. In 1990, she was conferred an honorary Doctor of Laws degree by Victoria University of Wellington, and in 1993 she was awarded the New Zealand Suffrage Centennial Medal. She was made a Companion of the New Zealand Order of Merit, for services to the community, in the 1997 Queen's Birthday Honours.

A fellowship in Māori health, awarded by the Health Research Council of New Zealand, is named in her honour.
