= Parrs Park =

Public park in Oratia, Auckland

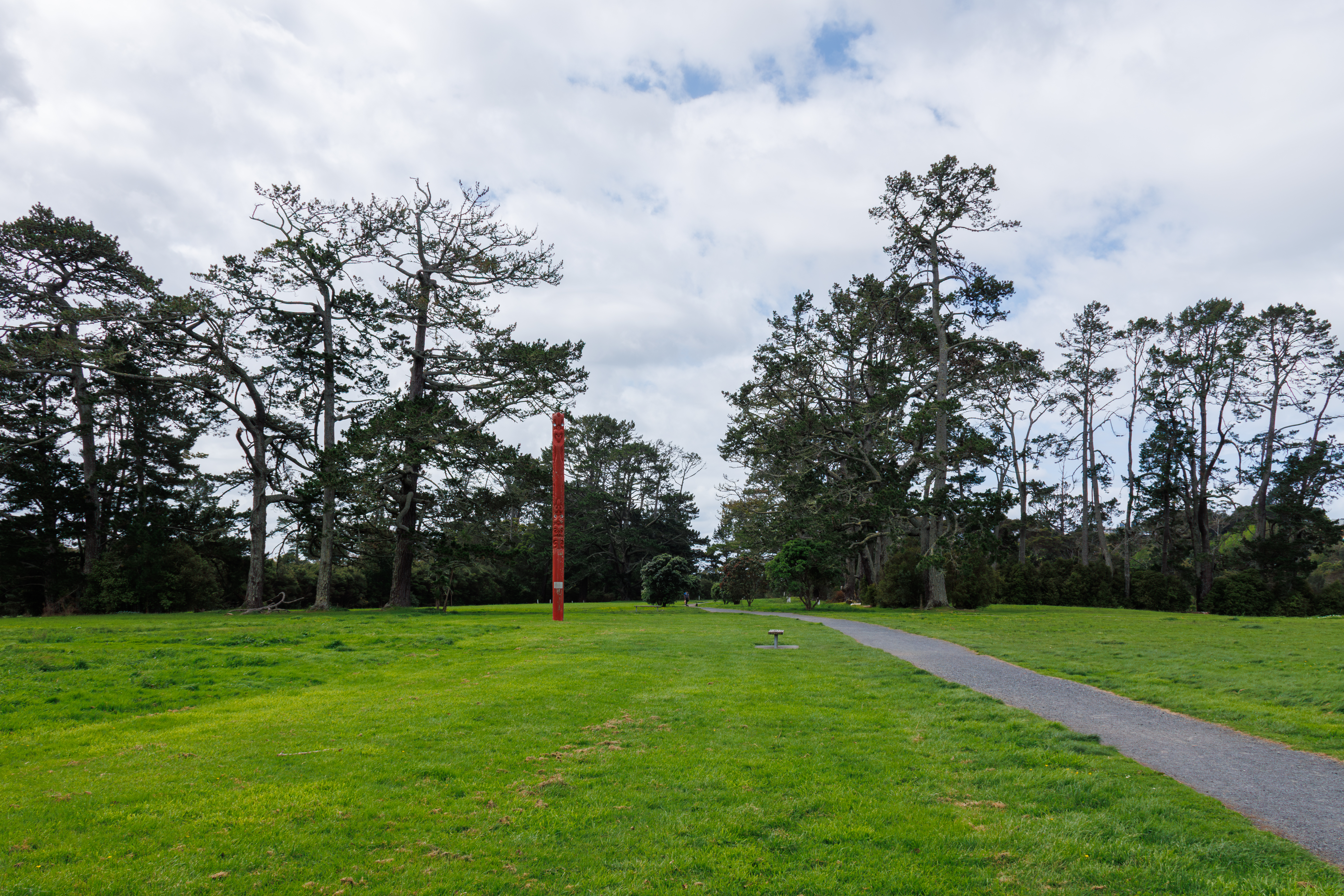
- View of Parrs Park and the pouwhenua
- Interactive map of Parrs Park
- Location: Oratia, West Auckland, New Zealand
- Coordinates: 36°54′20″S 174°37′44″E
- Operator: Auckland Council
- Open: All year round, seven days a week

Parrs Park is a public recreational and sporting facility in Oratia, West Auckland, New Zealand. The park has lease arrangements with clubs and cultural organisations that have buildings and facilities on the perimeter and share the amenities of the park. The local community has a strong relationship with the park, organising and participating in events on the grounds, providing feedback to the council and voicing concerns. Parrs Park has been managed under a number of different Council structures since 1966 and as of 2025, is jointly governed by elected members of the Waitākere Ranges Local Board, as part of Auckland Council.

== Location and history ==
The park is situated on what was historically ancestral land of Te Kawerau a Maki until a crown grant of 536 acres (217 ha) was purchased in 1855 by the Parrs, regarded as one of the earliest Pākehā families to settle in the area. Over the years, the property was split between the family and in 1966 a section of the land, that was later to become Parrs Park, was purchased by the Waitemata County Council. In 1968 when Parrs Park was still a 70-acre (28 ha) reserve, there was some debate about how to best develop it into an all-purpose sports ground but it was eventually put into a council plan that had "15 grassed sports fields for football, cricket, athletics and softball...[with]...provision for bowls, tennis, basketball and croquet". By June 1968, with the land then known as Parrs Cross Roads Reserve, the Waitemata County Council noted that it would terminate the existing lease on the land to allow tenders to be called to develop the area. On 15 April 1969, a councillor answered a claim in a letter to the local newspaper that "women bowlers had not been considered in pleas for the park development", and said that the Oratia Bowling Club had shown a lot of initiative, and "the County Council would welcome similar initiative on the part of other sporting organisations, including women bowlers...[concluding]...there [was] plenty of room at Parrs Park".

The cost of developing the sporting complex at the park was estimated as costing $2 million in 1972, with the project needing to done in stages, but early in 1974, the Western Leader reported that good progress was being made on developing the site and the council was aiming to have it completed by 1978. It was confirmed in the same article that although parts of the park had been leased to sporting bodies, Mr G Haddo, the county's parks and reserves superintendent said there would be "playing fields, a large car park and [a] children's play area". It also reported that the John Waititi Memorial Marae was under construction and the Waitemata Table Tennis and the Oratia Bowling clubs had expressed interest and surveyed the grounds.

Parrs Park was governed by the Waitākere City Council from 1989 until 2010 when it was replaced by the Waitakere Ward, with two local boards including Waitākere Ranges in a merged Auckland Council. During this period progress was made on several projects for the park and in 1998 Hoani Waititi Marae proceeded with the development of a tertiary institute and a Reserve Management Plan for the park was developed. Funding was also secured for building a full-sized artificial turf in 2009 and Derek Battersby from the council said that the turf would bring many benefits "including increased playing hours and field capacity as well as opening up new sporting opportunities". In the same year a journalist reported that it was likely the $20 million combined aquatic and ice centre at the park would be signed off with a goal of having the facilities open by 2012.

Because it is located at the point where the Waikumete Stream joins the Oratia Stream, the park is included in Project Twin Streams that since 2006 has seen the community, Ecomatters Environmental Trust and Auckland Council aim to restore local streams, including the section at Parrs Park.

== Facilities ==
=== Sporting facilities ===
In 2010, The Waitakere Council noted the extensive use of the park for soccer, serving as the home to the Oratia United Football Club and recorded that summer sports on the fields included cricket and kilikiti on three pitches at the time, one artificial and one a roll-up. Volleyball could be played in a specially developed sand area, a basketball half court was constructed in 1997 and there was one wooden skate ramp. As part of an upgrade in 2011 that included floodlighting, artificial turf was installed in the Park.

=== Children's playground ===
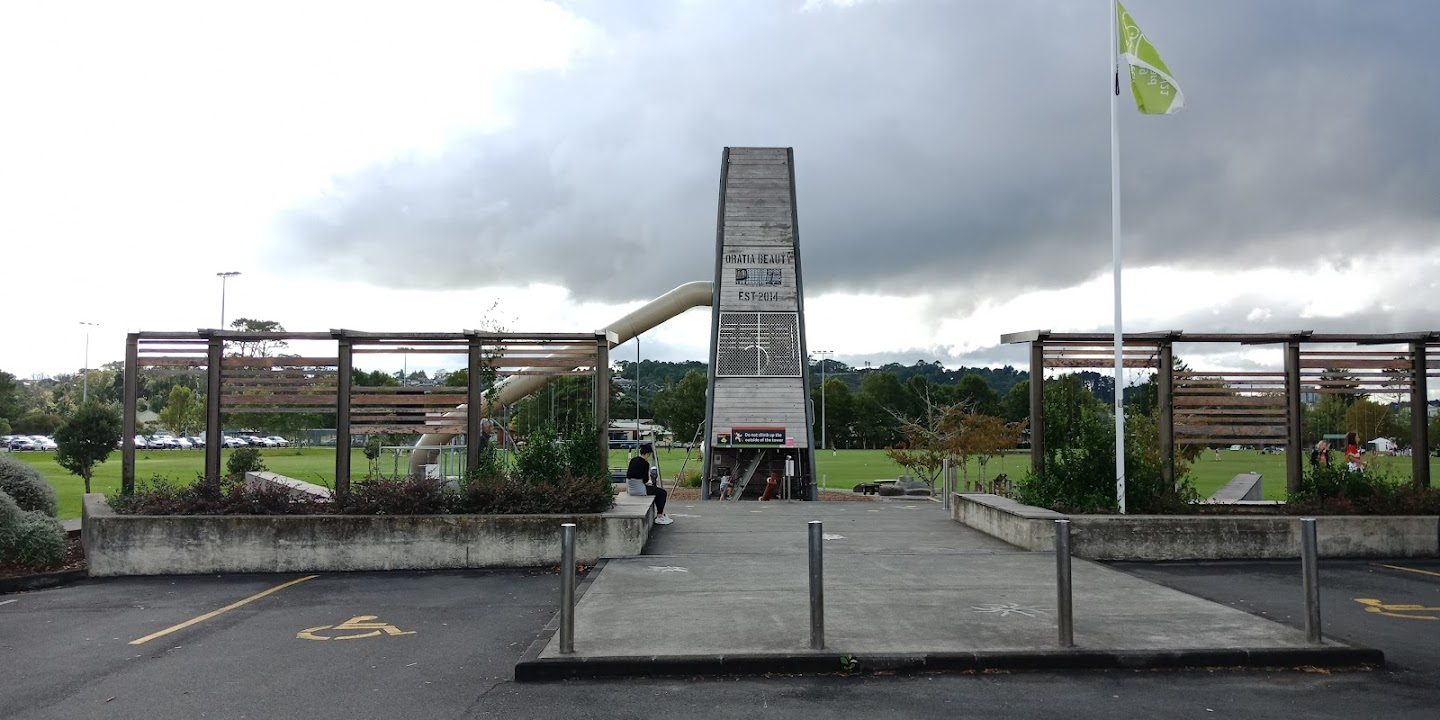
Entrance and playground

In July 2013, it was confirmed that there was a new playground for the park under construction. The designer of the playground Catherine Hamilton described the structure as having spacious decks with age-appropriate levels of accessibility. Judy Lawley, previously on the Waitakere Council but at this time member of the Waitakere Ranges Local Board, noted that the development of the amenity had taken over 6 years but with a lot of new families coming into the area, "this park will be sooooo needed and incredibly popular". The playground was opened in 2014 and this aligned with the policy of Auckland Council to have a playground within a 15-minute walk from housing areas, estimated in 2017 as establishing "one public playground, free to use, for every 378 children under 15 within the city". The structure had an 11 metre high tower named 'Oratia Beauty' in recognition of the horticulture past of the area. The tower had four levels with climbing activities and two slides and a giant Giant Birds Nest Swing over 5 metres high with a 360 degree swing-arc. There was also a facility for sand and water play, including water pumps and dams that allowed children to experiment with water flow.

=== Fitness and recreation ===
Around the perimeter of the Park there is a 1.2 km (0.75 mi) scenic path that is wide and flat and suitable for walking or biking. The park also has a basketball half court, a fitness trail and a skate park.

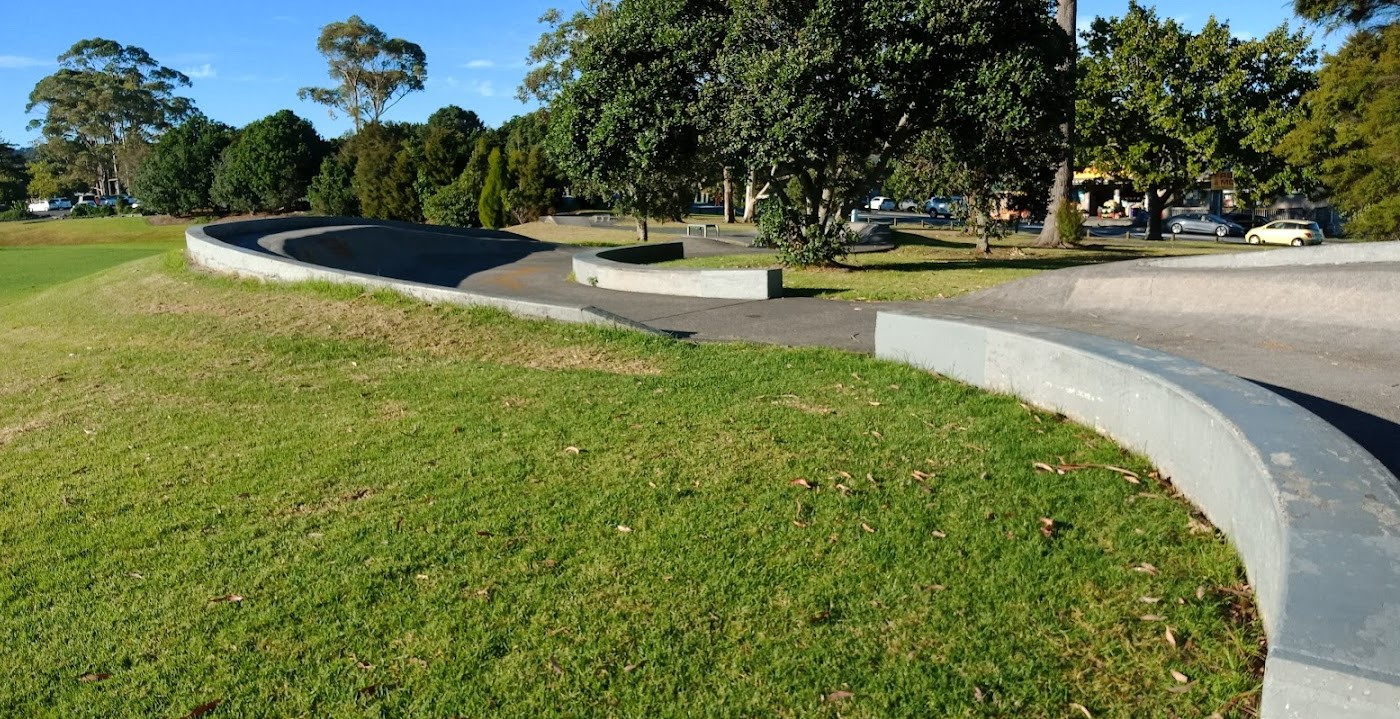
Walkway

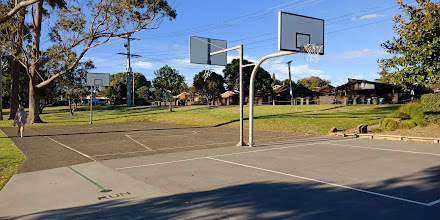
Half basketball court

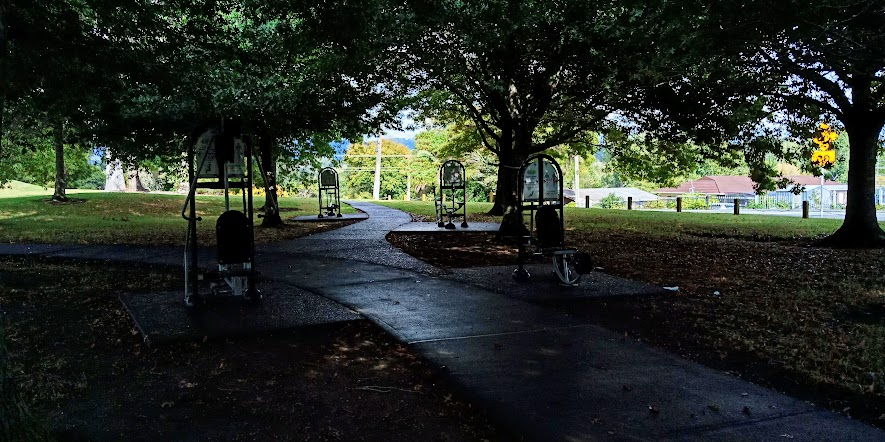
Fitness circuit

== Attached clubs and organisations ==
=== Waitemata Table Tennis Club ===
In 2012 it was proposed that a new table tennis stadium was to be built at the park to be completed in time for the Veterans Table Tennis Championships in 2014. Denise Yates, Chairperson of the local board at the time, expressed support for the project and "continue to work with Waitakere Table Tennis Association to secure whatever is needed to get on with the stadium project and make the event happen". The New Zealand Community Trust announced funding of $146,000 toward the construction of a new table tennis stadium at Parrs Park to be managed by the Waitemata Table Tennis Club. It was noted that the changing demographics in the area recognised that the significant Chinese and Asian populations in West Auckland are attracted to the familiarity of a sport that is hugely popular in their homelands...[and because]..."these ethnic groups are under-represented as participants in more traditional New Zealand sports, table tennis provides an important avenue for them to be physically active, healthy, and involved in their community".

=== Swimming Centre ===
After beginning in a local school's pool, the Waterhole Swimming Club, later renamed the Waterhole Swimming Centre, became based at Parrs Park in 1985. In 2015 it was intended to set up a trust to develop the Waterhole and present a plan to the local Board.

=== Oratia United Association football club ===
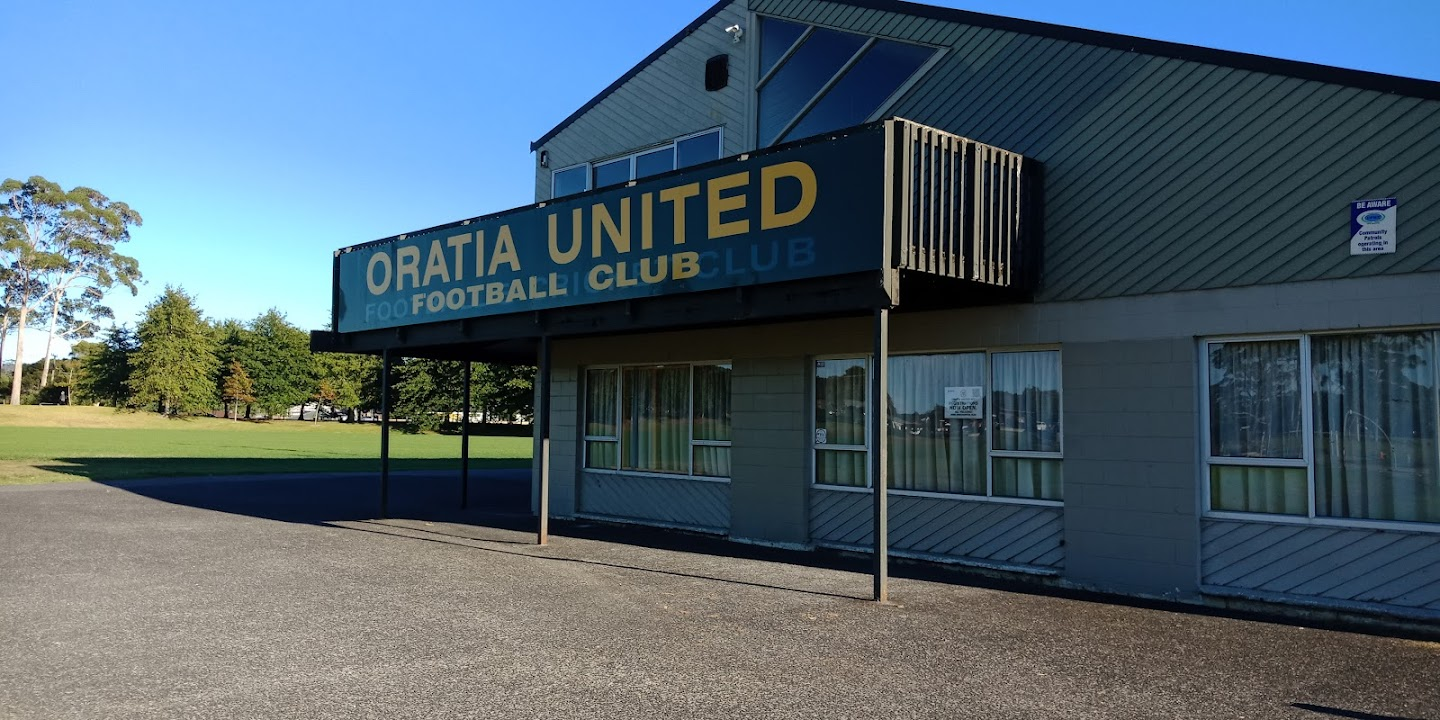
Oratia United Football Club Parrs Park

The Oratia United Association Football Club was given a 'Permit to Occupy' in 1977, and when the construction of the clubrooms was completed this was replaced in 1978 with a lease. The clubrooms were shared with the Oratia cricket club, and in 2014, both clubs began planning a project to upgrade their building and establish a new community centre to be used for a variety of sporting activities. The group was supported by Sport Waitakere to present a proposal to the local board to get approval to begin a formal feasibility study. In the agenda for the meeting of the board on 16 May 2014, it was noted that the purpose of this deputation was to "inform and get support from the Local Board of the intended sport partnership at Parrs Park, and the opportunities that will be explored for development through a feasibility study", and it was received at the meeting.

=== Hoani Waititi Marae ===
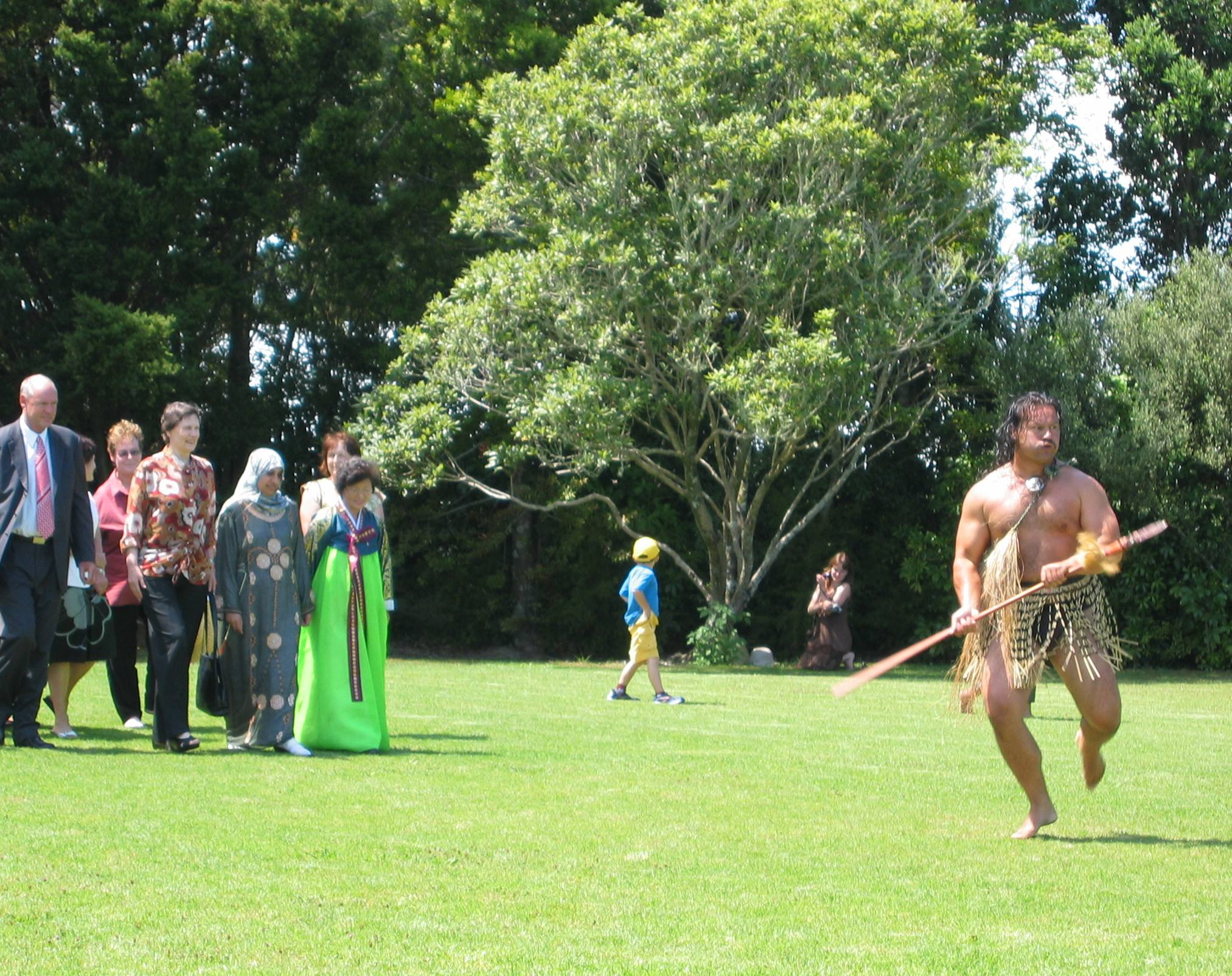
Helen Clark being welcomed on to Hoani Waititi Marae in 2006

Hoani Waititi Marae is an urban marae which opened on 19 April 1980, as a hub for Urban Māori communities in West Auckland, to serve as a connection to Māori values, language and norms. The marae complex is home to Ngā Tūmanako, a wharenui, as well as Te Kura Kaupapa Māori o Hoani Waititi, one of the first Kura Kaupapa Māori (language immersion schools) in New Zealand.

== Governance since 2010 ==
The outgoing Waitākere City Council developed a 10-year plan in 2009 that identified issues and actions that needed to be addressed if parks in the area were to support the council's eco city vision and delivery and enhance the community's quality of life and create identity in local neighbourhoods. It found the provision of quality open space for active sports and quiet areas for passive use contributes to the wellbeing of the city. In its final strategic initiative, the Waitakere City Council developed a Reserve Management Plan for Parrs Park in 2010. This plan acknowledged the importance of maintaining and improving existing sports fields, increasing other amenities with more picnic and barbeque areas and walking tracks within the park and looked forward to more gardens, trees, equipment for young people, including a skate park, and lit walkways through the park. It would include constructing a stage for events and an eight court petanque facility.

Since 2010 strategic planning for Parrs Park has been coordinated by the Waitākere Ranges Local Board and in the 2014 Board plan, it was noted that Auckland Council has a unique model of local government in New Zealand, consisting of the governing body (the mayor and 20 ward councillors) and 21 local boards. The governing body focuses on the big picture and on Auckland-wide issues and decisions. Local boards provide local leadership and make decisions on local issues, activities and facilities, such as parks, libraries and community halls.

Following elections in October 2016, the entire Waitakere Ranges Local Board was composed of the Future West team and one of their priorities was the development of the shared pathway from Oratia to Parrs Park.

Local Board Plans were explained in 2017 as being strategic documents that are developed every three years to set a direction for local boards. Reflecting community priorities and preferences, the plans guide local board activity, funding and investment decisions and, within Auckland Council's budget, set out local funding priorities, budgets, levels of service, performance measures and targets by activity for each financial year. The same document signaled strategic thinking by identifying that some of the parks in the area were not always as inviting as they could be, and the Board aimed to improve amenity and recreational use for locals so that these parks are used more regularly actively for exercise, but also as quiet communal spaces.

The Board's plan for 2020, further clarified the governance role as being to engage with and represent their communities, and make decisions on local activities, noting the goals for that year included aiming for well maintained, accessible parks, facilities and public spaces. This includes improving local parks to encourage people to spend time outside. The plan incorporates Māori design principles into playgrounds and other park features. It tries to provide access to year-round affordable or free activities in local parks and facilities.

On 1 July 2021, at a meeting that had been reconvened from 24 June 2021, the Waitākere Ranges Local Board approved The Play Provision Assessment, a document that had been described in an earlier agenda [as providing] strategic and holistic planning context to the provision of formal play provided across the parks network, helping to guide future investment and development decisions related to play in Waitākere Ranges over the next decade. This assessment looked at all council play spaces and identified possible improvements or upgrades.

== Community engagement ==
=== Feedback ===
In 2015, a Parrs Park visitor survey was conducted by Auckland Council. Suggested improvements from those surveyed included more shade, better rubbish management, cleaner toilets, more seats and tables and better lighting. However, results indicated that overall there were high levels of satisfaction with the park which was "valued as a space to play, watch sport and exercise dogs". Visitors particularly liked the "children's playground, the sports fields, the open space and the walking / running paths...[and]...more than half of all visitors (59%) used the park at least once a week over the last 12 months, indicating that for many visitors, Parrs Park plays an important role in their day-to-day lives".

Change and Development in Glen Eden 2017 Report the Waitākere Ranges Local Board collated positive feedback from the community on the facilities at Parrs Park, with comments such as: "Parrs Park is beautiful. They have done a really nice children's area. I take my grandchildren there and there's always people playing sports on those fields...[and]...I love what they have done with Parrs Park, love the slide and our kids talk about it".

=== Events ===
Parrs Park has hosted celebrations on Waitangi Day and in 2009 held the Concert in The Park featuring local New Zealand performers including Greg Johnson and Jordan Luck.

In 2017, as part of an environmental initiative from Avondale seen as a "celebration of all things green" to support the Waitākere Ranges, the park hosted the Kauri Karnival with a specific focus on kauri and the risk of kauri dieback disease in the area.

During Youth Week, on 22 May 2019 Parrs Park hosted "3 on 3 b-ball competition, music, performances, graf art...[and]...free siva, box fit and hip hop dance classes".

When the New Zealand Prime Minister Jacinda Ardern announced in October 2021 that there was going to be a reduction in lockdowns in Auckland that had been part of the COVID-19 response and people would have more freedoms including visiting beaches and parks, Parrs Park was noted in the media at the time as "a popular destination for a catch-up, with socially-distanced people kicking a ball around".

=== Concerns ===
In 2009 some Glen Eden residents expressed anger at the tagging and vandalism that was happening at the park, mentioning graffiti and bush that was littered with bottles and cans. One resident said the park felt "intimidating" and others said that despite improvements being made to the park, including replanting and a new path in 2003, little had been done to address this issue. Mike Hayes the chairman at the time of Oratia United Football Club that used the ground as its home base, noted that it was a 'big park and some parts are very secluded...[and]...unless there [were] other place for youths to go, the problem will continue".

After installation of the artificial turf in 2011 which had meant the grounds were in use in the evenings, in the Auckland Council lodged a resource consent application in 2013 to raise the allowed noise level. Local residents complained about the possibility of this and asked for it to be closed for two nights a week and on Sundays. The Council manager Mark Bowater said that the noise levels were higher than expected and professional help was sought to look at options. Oratia United Football chairman Peter Goodburn said that Parrs Park was their home ground and to lose Sunday would affect the ability of a facility funded by taxpayers to be used to its full capacity if it lost Sunday use it would be seriously affected. Goodburn noted [that] "this field gives us the ability to reach out to young people and get them involved in sports and that's a big goal of ours because it's far better for them to be playing football than out causing trouble". Although the noise levels at the time exceeded those permitted by the council, another resident said in a letter to the New Zealand Herald that "this seems ridiculous to me as the fields have always been there and these people bought their homes knowing sports were played there". It was however noted in the same media article, that the former Waitakere City Council during the Super Merger of Auckland councils, "had obtained a non-notified resource consent which covered use of floodlights yet did not consult the neighbours about noise". When commissioners managing the resource application said that while "they considered it was in the interests of the wider community that adequate use was made of such an important facility...[they were]... conscious of the fact that any use of the turf has the potential to exceed the permitted activity noise standards".

The council's right to prevent a small-business owner selling fruit and vegetable drinks at Parrs Park was challenged in 2017 and Sandra Coney clarified that while the Council did not have a policy preventing this, the decision was made with reference to the Parrs Park management plan, and that she felt "there there was a benefit to having a park where parents and children aren't under pressure to spend money". Another councillor said that the council supports "mobile traders and stallholders...[and the vendor, while constrained in this case was encouraged]...to explore the range of other mobile trading opportunities available to him". The vendor responded that "the rules in Auckland were too restrictive and he didn't think they were supported by the public".

In 2021 residents of Glen Eden and the Waitakere Ranges Local Board expressed concern when David Parker the New Zealand Environmental Minister accepted an application by a construction company through the COVID-19 Recovery (fast-track consenting) Act 2020 to build 246 units on a site close to Parrs Park. Greg Presland, Waitakere Ranges Local Board chairman, said he was "worried about transport implications...[that would]... lead to further traffic congestion on West Coast Rd...[raising]...concerns for Parrs Park as it was pretty heavily utilised". Feedback on the issue from the local board was provided to Auckland Council reiterating that the board had been consulted on the fast-track application and urged for it not to continue, noting concerns about "protecting provision of open space in the area...[and that]...the pressure on Parrs Park will be intense. If this application is granted then the pressure will be even more significant".

== Awards ==
In March 2018 The New Zealand Recreation Association announced that Parrs Park was one of 18 New Zealand parks to have won the international Green Flag Award, "judged by green space-expert volunteers, across eight criteria...[against]... criteria [which] include horticultural standards, cleanliness, sustainability, community involvement and providing a warm welcome". The park, along with Waikumete Cemetery, had previously won this award in 2014, 2016 and 2017 and Saffron Toms, Deputy Chair of Waitākere Ranges Local Board said [they were] "well-deserved awards for two absolutely fantastic parks...[that are]...both really well utilised by the community and cater for a wide range of needs".
