= Nan Owen =

New Zealand art teacher, museum manager, and community leader

Nan (Noleene Grace) Owen
- Born: 13 December 1928
- Died: 25 May 2025 (aged 96)
- Occupations: Teacher, museum manager
- Awards: New Zealand Suffrage Centennial Medal, Queen's Service Medal

Nan (Noleene Grace) Owen QSM (c. 1928–25 May 2025) was a New Zealand art teacher, museum manager, and community leader.

== Life ==
Born Noleene Grace Jorey in Auckland, Owen started her teaching career in Ōtorohanga in 1950, teaching art at Ōtorohanga College and surrounding communities.

Upon moving to Ōtorohanga, she began collecting historical items and documents reflecting the town's history. Later, she managed Ōtorohanga Museum for 20 years. Owen was a volunteer with several other civic organisations, including Plunket, St John's, and the Citizens Advice Bureau.

In 1993 she received the New Zealand Suffrage Centennial Medal, and in 1997 the Queen's Service Medal. These awards spelled her first name 'Noeline'.

== Death ==
Owen died in Ōtorohanga, aged 96.
