= Hoani Waititi Marae =

Urban marae in Auckland, New Zealand

- Urban marae
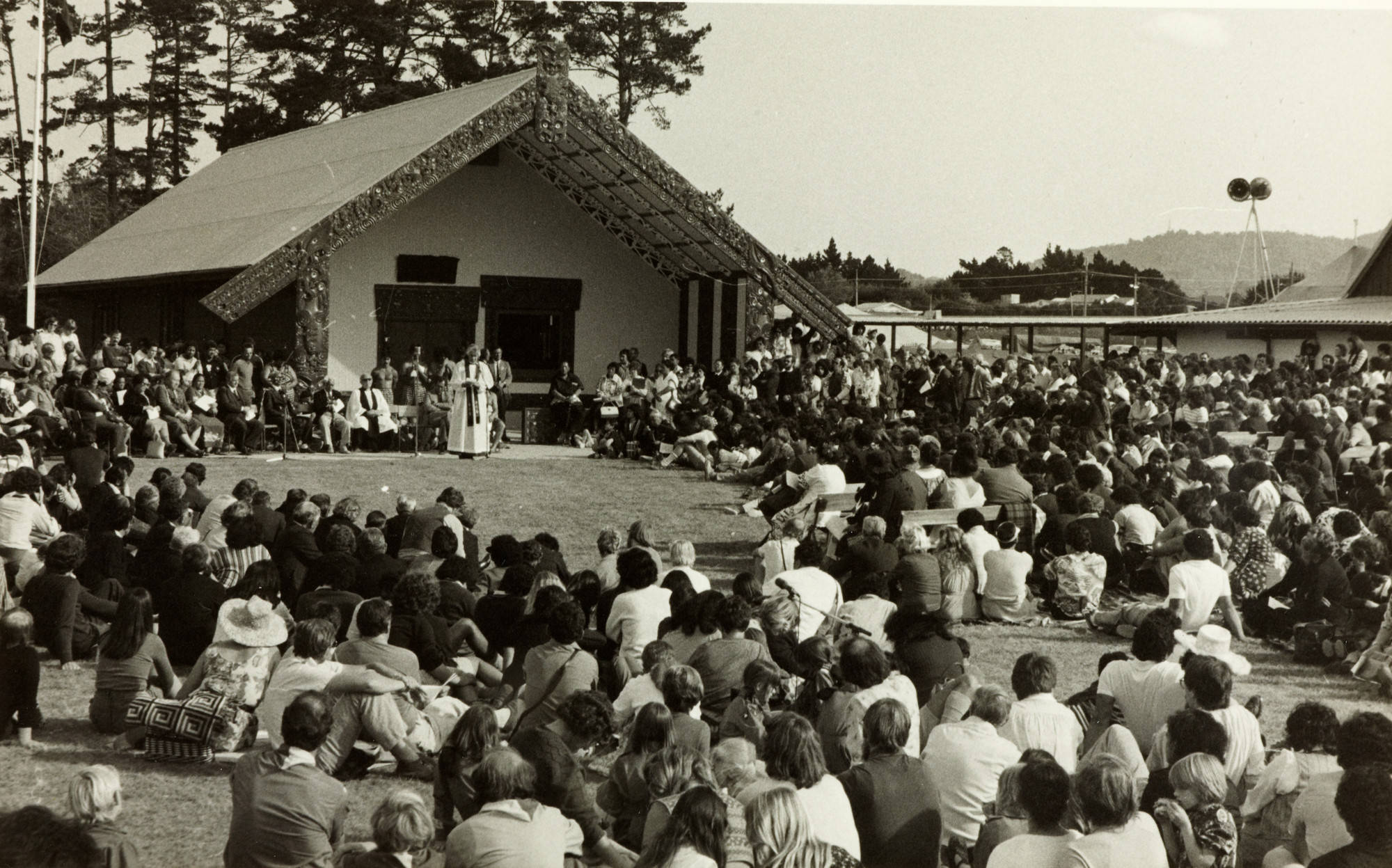
- The opening of Hoani Waititi Marae in 1980
- Interactive map of Hoani Waititi Marae
- Coordinates: 36.905585°S 174.631258°E
- Location: Parrs Park, Oratia, Auckland, New Zealand
- Iwi: pan-iwi
- Opened: 19 April 1980
- Constructed: c. 1973/1974
- Wharenui: Ngā Tūmanako
- Website: hoaniwaititimarae.co.nz

Hoani Waititi Marae is an urban marae located in West Auckland, New Zealand. The marae acts as a community hub for the Urban Māori population of West Auckland, and is the site of Te Kura Kaupapa Māori o Hoani Waititi, one of the first Kura Kaupapa Māori established in New Zealand. Some of New Zealand's largest annual Waitangi Day celebrations are held at the marae, and feature major Aotearoa musical artists, and food and craft stalls.

== History ==
During the 1950s and 1960s, the Department of Māori Affairs encouraged Māori to move from traditional homes, usually in rural areas of the country, to the major cities of New Zealand, in order to provide labour for businesses and factories. In Auckland, Urban Māori first settled around the city's inner suburbs such as Freemans Bay, Ponsonby, however as housing quality was often substandard, the New Zealand Government established large-scale housing projects in the city's outer suburbs, including Te Atatū Peninsula in West Auckland.

The Urban Māori population of West Auckland greatly increased, especially Ngāti Porou from the Gisborne District and Ngāpuhi from Northland. Many people felt alienated from their traditional lands, hapū structures, and that their connection to Māori culture was being lost. Fundraising for a Māori-led community hub began in 1967, In 1973-74 Hoani Waititi Marae (Inc.) leased 3.45 ha of Parrs Park to construct urban marae facilities. On 19 April 1980 the Hoani Waititi Marae was opened. The marae is named after Hoani Waititi, a West Auckland resident who spent years of his life promoting adult education among West Auckland Māori communities.

The marae less serves as a traditional meeting place of a specific hapū, typical of marae, and instead acts as a space that is distinctively Māori: a place for Māori values, language and norms.

In 1984, Te Whānau o Waipareira (the Waipareira Trust) was established as a united body to promote Māori wellbeing in West Auckland, operating from the same complex as the marae. In the same year, two major figures involved with Hoani Waititi Marae, Aroha Sharples and Pita Sharples, saddened at hearing that children who attended kōhanga reo (language immersion kindergartens) felt the need to suppress their language and culture in mainstream schools, began establishing a kura kaupapa Māori (Māori-language immersion school) at the marae. Te Kura Kaupapa Māori o Hoani Waititi opened the following year in 1985. Te Kura Kaupapa Māori o Hoani Waititi was funded by the families of the students who attended the kura until 1989, when legislation was introduced to formally recognise immersion schools. The school is often called the first kura kaupapa Māori to open in New Zealand, and the school was widely influential, as a model for the creation of other kura kaupapa Māori across the country.

The marae's annual Waitangi Day celebrations greatly grew in popularity in the 2010s, with an estimated 35,000 people attending the 2019 Waitangi Day event. In 2021 three markets were held at Hoani Waititi Marae. These offered entertainment, Māori cuisine and the opportunity to purchase taonga directly from the artists.

== Wharenui ==
The wharenui of the marae is called Ngā Tūmanako. The whakairo of the wharenui was designed by Hōne Taiapa, and primarily carved by Laurie Nicholas While typical marae depict tupuna (ancestors) or traditional stories associated with the area, a different style was chosen for Hoani Waititi Marae, as the marae was not claiming traditional ownership of West Auckland, instead acting as an urban hub and a Māori cultural space. The poupou represent seven migratory waka that voyaged to New Zealand, depicting seven regional art styles, so that no single group could claim ownership of the space. Three Western-style ships are depicted in the carvings, including James Cook's ship the HMS Endeavour.
