= Jarrod Haar =

New Zealand academic

Jarrod McKenzie Haar
- Education: University of Waikato
- Scientific career
- Fields: Organisational psychology
- Workplaces: Auckland University of Technology
- Thesis: Examining work-family practice use and employee attitudes in a New Zealand local government organisation (2002)
- Doctoral students: Maree Roche

Jarrod McKenzie Haar is a New Zealand organisational psychology academic, are Māori, of Ngati Maniapoto and Ngati Mahuta descent and as of 2019 is a full professor at the Auckland University of Technology. He is a Fellow of the Royal Society Te Apārangi.

== Academic career ==
After a 2002 PhD titled 'Examining work-family practice use and employee attitudes in a New Zealand local government organisation' at the University of Waikato, Haar moved to the Auckland University of Technology, rising to full professor. A notable doctoral student of Haar is Maree Roche.

Haar is convener of a Marsden Fund panel.

Haar is a proponent of the Four-day week.

== Awards ==
In March 2021, Haar was created a Fellow of the Royal Society Te Apārangi, recognising that "his work on families and how to balance job and family demands is not only ground-breaking in a scientific sense, but of such practical importance to New Zealand and globally".

== Selected works ==
- Haar, Jarrod M., Marcello Russo, Albert Suñe, and Ariane Ollier-Malaterre. "Outcomes of work–life balance on job satisfaction, life satisfaction and mental health: A study across seven cultures." Journal of Vocational Behavior 85, no. 3 (2014): 361–373.
- Roche, Maree, Jarrod M. Haar, and Fred Luthans. "The role of mindfulness and psychological capital on the well-being of leaders." Journal of Occupational Health Psychology 19, no. 4 (2014): 476.
- Haar, Jarrod M., and Chester S. Spell. "Programme knowledge and value of work-family practices and organizational commitment." The International Journal of Human Resource Management 15, no. 6 (2004): 1040–1055.
- Haar, Jarrod M. "Work-family conflict and turnover intention: Exploring the moderation effects." New Zealand Journal of Psychology 33, no. 1 (2004): 35–39.
