= Iritana Tāwhiwhirangi =

New Zealand Māori language advocate (1929–2025)

Dame Iritana Tāwhiwhirangi DNZM MBE
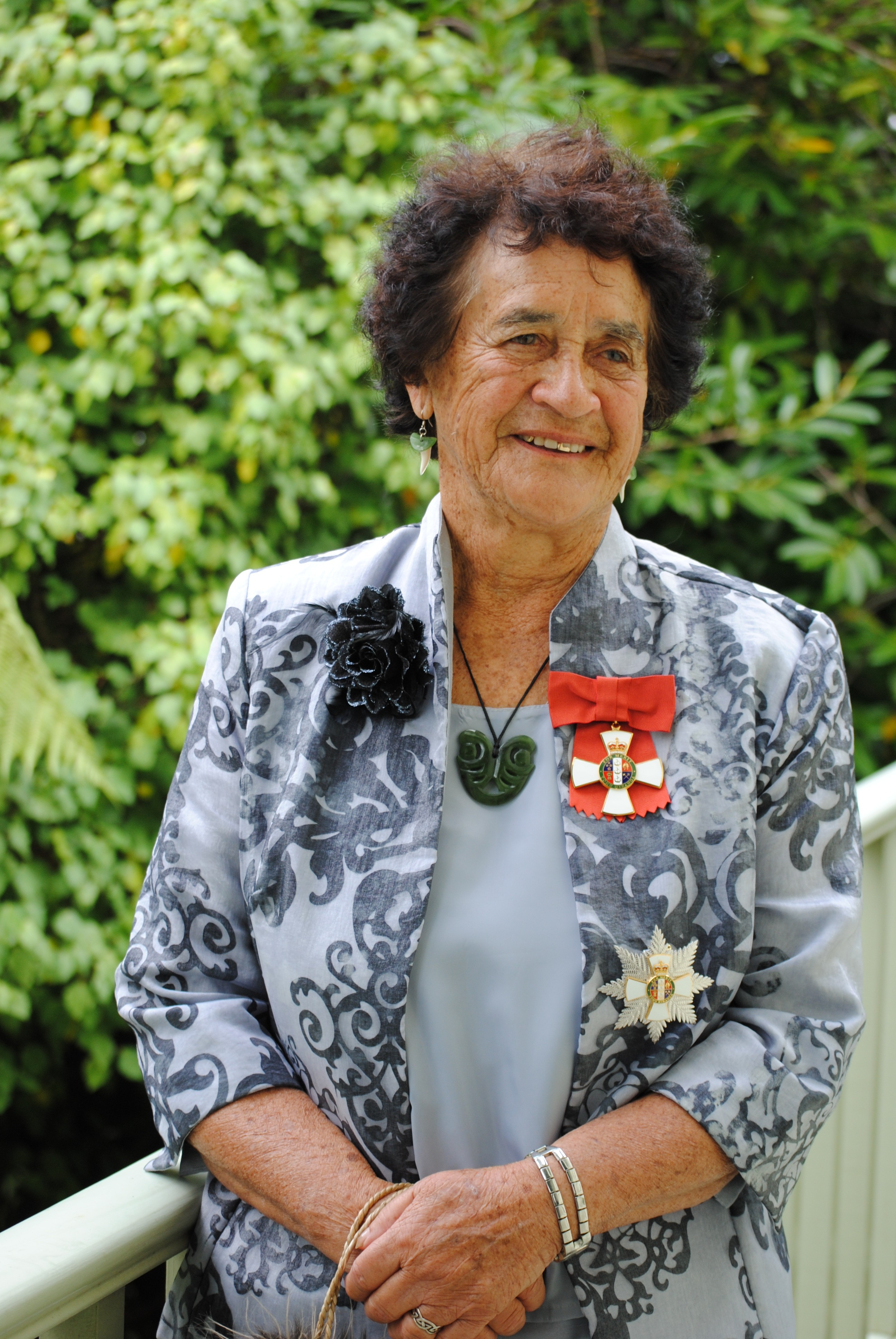
- Tāwhiwhirangi in 2010
- Born: Irirangi Thatcher; 21 March 1929; Wharekahika / Hicks Bay, New Zealand
- Died: 1 February 2025 (aged 95); New Zealand
- Education: Hukarere Girls' School
- Alma mater: Wellington Teachers' College
- Occupation: Educator
- Known for: Māori language advocacy
- Spouse: Porourangi Tāwhiwhirangi (m. 1949; died 1969)

Dame Iritana Te Rangi Tāwhiwhirangi DNZM MBE (born Irirangi Thatcher; 21 March 1929 – 1 February 2025) was a New Zealand advocate of Māori language education and the kōhanga reo movement.

== Biography ==
Born in Hicks Bay on 21 March 1929, Tāwhiwhirangi was of Ngāti Porou, Ngāti Kahungunu, Ngāpuhi, Canadian and English descent. She was educated at Hukarere Girls' School from 1943 to 1946, and then Wellington Teachers' College from 1947 to 1948. While in Wellington, Tāwhiwhirangi met and in 1949 married Porourangi Tāwhiwhirangi, a rangatira of Ngāti Porou. After, the pair returned to the East Coast and Tāwhiwhirangi began teaching at Waiōmatatini School. Her husband passed away in 1969.

By the 1980s, Tāwhiwhirangi left teaching, instead returning to Wellington to work within the Department of Māori Affairs. After attending national planning hui at Waiwhetu Marae in 1980, she dedicated her efforts to revitalizing Te Reo Māori. To do so, she traveled around New Zealand, visiting marae advocating for a new, Māori-led form of education to assist in restoring the language. These efforts led to the establishment of te Kōhanga reo, schools that focused on complete immersion for kindergarten-aged children, taught by Māori elders. Tāwhiwhirangi's advocacy across the country was highly effective, as by 1982, there were 100, a number which continued to grow to 800 in 1994, although as of 2026 this has now receded to 460. Tāwhiwhirangi was a life member of the Māori Women's Welfare League and Toitū Kaupapa Māori Mātauranga – Māori Education Trust. She served on the Board of Trustees of the Te Kōhanga Reo National Trust.

Tāwhiwhirangi died on 1 February 2025, at the age of 95.

== Honours and awards ==
Tāwhiwhirangi was awarded the New Zealand 1990 Commemoration Medal, and in the 1992 New Year Honours, she was appointed a Member of the Order of the British Empire, in recognition of her role as general manager of Te Kōhanga Reo National Trust. In 1993, she received the New Zealand Suffrage Centennial Medal.

In the 2001 New Year Honours, Tāwhiwhirangi was appointed a Companion of the New Zealand Order of Merit for services to Māori education, and in the 2009 Queen's Birthday Honours she was promoted to Dame Companion, also for services to Māori education.

Tāwhiwhirangi was a finalist for the 2014 New Zealander of the Year Awards.
