= Rutherford College, Auckland =

Rutherford College

Location
- Kotuku Street, Te Atatū Peninsula, Auckland, New Zealand; 36.8513°S 174.6465°E

Information
- Type: State co-ed secondary (Year 9–13)
- Established: 5 February 1961; 65 years ago
- Ministry of Education Institution no.: 40
- Principal: Gary Moore
- Enrolment: 1,607 (July 2026)
- Socio-economic decile: 5M
- Website: www.rutherford.school.nz

Rutherford College (called Rutherford High School from 1961 to 2001) is a co-educational state secondary school on the Te Atatū Peninsula, Auckland, New Zealand. It is named after New Zealand-born nuclear physicist and chemist Ernest Rutherford.

== History ==
Rutherford High School opened in 1961, with Eric Clark as the first principal. The school rapidly developed as the farms and orchards of Te Atatū were developed into housing. The school was the first in New Zealand to offer drama and dance as school subjects.

Like most New Zealand secondary schools built in the 1960s, Rutherford High School was built to the Nelson two-storey standard plan. The Nelson two-storey is characterised by its two-storey H-shaped classroom blocks, with stairwells at each end of the block and a large ground floor toilet and cloak area on one side. The school has two Nelson two-storey blocks: B block and C block. A third Nelson two-storey block, known as D block, was destroyed by fire on 24 January 1975, reportedly caused by a teacher preparing for the new school year leaving a science demonstration unattended. More than 40 firefighters from Henderson, Glen Eden and Auckland fought the blaze, with the cost of damage estimated at $750,000 (equivalent to $9,430,000 in 2026).

Eric Clark was appointed an Officer of the Order of the British Empire in the 1983 Queen's Birthday Honours, and retired as principal the following year.

== Enrolment ==
As of July 2026, Rutherford College has a roll of 1,607 students, of which 326 (20.3%) identify as Māori.

As of 2026, the school has an Equity Index of 459, placing it amongst schools whose students have average socioeconomic barriers to achievement (roughly equivalent to deciles 5 and 6 under the former socio-economic decile system).

== Curriculum ==
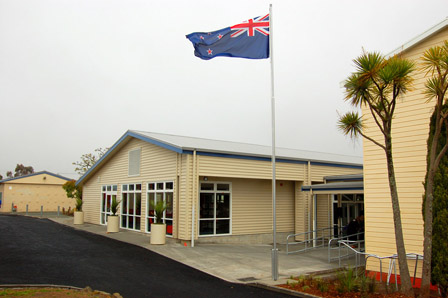
Rutherford College Information Commons

Rutherford College is a New Zealand Qualifications Authority accredited co-educational Year 9–13 State Secondary school. It caters for students from year 9 to year 13, as well as providing adult education, special education and night courses. It offers well-qualified, professional staff are very successful in challenging students to achieve academic success in national assessments. The school teaches core subjects such as English, Mathematics and Science, and helps senior students pass NCEA (National Certificate of Educational Achievement). As well as core subjects, specialist subjects such as Chinese Mandarin, Japanese, Māori and German are taught as a second language, as well as aviation, environmental science and biochemistry, arts, physical education, technology, accounting and economics.

== Tradition ==
The College encourages student participation in a wide range of extracurricular activities, again challenging students to reach their full potential in all areas.

- The school celebrates annually, Rutherford Day, to commemorate the history of the school.
- The official school song is ‘Me Hui Hui’, written by Pita Sharples
- Rutherford Colleges Kapa Haka group 'Te Rōpu Kapa Haka o Te Kōtuku' is also the top Mainstream group in the Auckland region.

== Notable staff ==
- Chris Carter (born 1952), politician
- Cliff Edmeades (born 1941), principal (1989–2006)
- Jack Elder (born 1949), politician
- Dame June Mariu (born 1932), community leader

== Notable alumni ==
=== Sport ===
- Ken Carrington – rugby union player, All Black (1971–72)
- Robbie Hunter-Paul – rugby league player
- Darren Liddel – weightlifter
- Henry Paul – rugby union and rugby league player
- Yvonne Willering – netball player and coach

=== The arts ===
- The La De Da's – 1960s/70s rock band, including Kevin Borich, first formed at Rutherford High
- Oscar Kightley – TV personality, actor (Bro' Town, Sione's Wedding)
- Pio Terei – TV personality, actor and comedian

=== Public service ===
- Simon Bridges – Former Minister of Transport and former National Party leader and MP for Tauranga. (Also the former Head Boy of the school)
- Dame Cindy Kiro – children's commissioner, academic, governor-general
- Tim Shadbolt – Mayor of Invercargill, former mayor of Waitemata City (one of the founding students of the school)
- Rawiri Waititi – Current Member of Parliament for Waiariki (New Zealand electorate), Co-Leader of Te Pāti Māori.
