= Maree Roche =

New Zealand management professor

Academic background
- Education: University of Waikato
- Thesis: Navigating Leaders' Wellbeing: What Does Self Determination Theory Contribute? (2013)
- Doctoral advisor: Jarrod McKenzie Haar, David McKie

Maree Roche is a New Zealand academic, and is a full professor at the University of Auckland, specialising in leadership, employee wellbeing and indigenous perspectives. Roche is the manutaki (director) of the university's Dame Mira Szászy Centre for Leading Māori Workforce Development. She is a Fellow of the New Zealand Psychological Society and of the Positive Organisational Behaviour Institute in the US.

== Academic career ==
Roche is Māori, and affiliates to Ngāti Raukawa. Roche completed a PhD titled Navigating Leaders' Wellbeing: What Does Self Determination Theory Contribute? at the University of Waikato, supervised by Jarrod Haar and David McKie. Roche then joined the faculty of the University of Waikato, where she was promoted to associate professor in 2021, before moving to Auckland, rising to full professor. Since 2023 Roche leads the Dame Mira Szászy Centre for Leading Māori Workforce Development at Auckland. She is a chartered member of the Human Resource Management Institute of New Zealand.

Roche researches leadership psychology, employee wellbeing, and indigenous perspectives on wellbeing and engagement. She covers such issues as the impacts of workplace bullying, workplace productivity, and changes in workforce pressure over time.

== Honours and awards ==
Roche was elected a Fellow of the New Zealand Psychological Society, and of the Positive Organisational Behavior Institute in America.

== Selected works ==
- Maree Roche; Jarrod M Haar; Fred Luthans (2014). "The role of mindfulness and psychological capital on the well-being of leaders". Journal of Occupational Health Psychology. 19 (4): 476–489. doi:10.1037/a0037183. PMID 24933594. Wikidata Q39175333.
- Steven L Grover; Stephen Teo; Pick, David; Maree Roche (2016). "Mindfulness as a personal resource to reduce work stress in the job demands-resources model". Stress and Health. 33 (4): 426–436. doi:10.1002/smi.2726. PMID 27862960. Wikidata Q39174502.
- Steven L. Grover; Stephen T.T. Teo; Pick, David; Maree Roche; Cameron J. Newton (2018). "Psychological capital as a personal resource in the JD-R model". Personnel Review. 47 (4): 968–984. doi:10.1108/pr-08-2016-0213. Wikidata Q122360697.
- Jarrod M. Haar; Maree A. Roche (2010). "Family supportive organization perceptions and employee outcomes: the mediating effects of life satisfaction". International Journal of Human Resource Management. 21 (7): 999–1014. doi:10.1080/09585191003783462. Wikidata Q58828930.
- Lieke L. Ten Brummelhuis; Jarrod M. Haar; Maree Roche (2013). "Does Family Life Help to be a Better Leader? A Closer Look at Crossover Processes From Leaders to Followers". Personnel Psychology. 67 (4): 917–949. doi:10.1111/peps.12057. Wikidata Q58828919.
- Gardner, Dianne; Michael O'Driscoll; Helena D Cooper-Thomas; Maree Roche; Tim Bentley; Bevan Catley; Stephen Teo; Linda Trenberth (2016). "Predictors of Workplace Bullying and Cyber-Bullying in New Zealand". International Journal of Environmental Research and Public Health. 13 (5). doi:10.3390/ijerph13050448. PMC 4881073. PMID 27128929. Wikidata Q36937825.
- Jarrod M. Haar; Maree Roche; Daniel Taylor (2012). "Work–family conflict and turnover intentions of indigenous employees: the importance of the whanau/family for Maori". International Journal of Human Resource Management. 23 (12): 2546–2560. doi:10.1080/09585192.2011.610344. Wikidata Q58828927.
