= Rawiri Waititi =

New Zealand politician

Rawiri Waititi MP
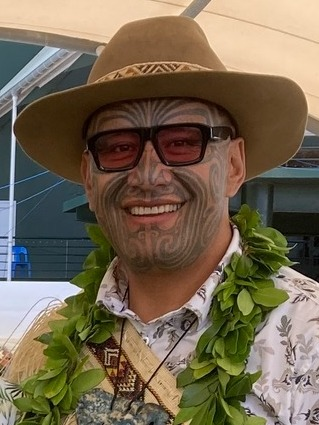
- Waititi in 2025

7th Co-leader of Te Pāti Māori
- Incumbent
- Assumed office 28 October 2020 Co-leader with Debbie Ngarewa-Packer
- Preceded by: John Tamihere

Member of the New Zealand Parliament for Waiariki
- Incumbent
- Assumed office 17 October 2020
- Preceded by: Tāmati Coffey
- Majority: 15,891

Personal details
- Born: 17 October 1980 or 1981 (age 44–45) Ōpōtiki, Bay of Plenty, New Zealand
- Party: Te Pāti Māori (2016–present); Labour (until 2016)
- Spouse: Kiri Tamihere-Waititi
- Children: 5
- Relatives: Hoani Waititi (grand-uncle); Dame June Mariu (aunt); Kahurangi Waititi (relation); Taika Waititi (relation); Tweedie Waititi (relation); Rob Ruha (relation); John Tamihere (father-in-law)
- Profession: Politician and Ringatū Minister
- Website: Māori Party profile

Rawiri Wikuki Waititi (born 17 October 1980 or 1981) is a New Zealand politician and iwi leader. He has been co-leader of Te Pāti Māori since 2020, alongside Debbie Ngarewa-Packer. He has served as the Member of Parliament (MP) for Waiariki since 2020, when his election returned Te Pāti Māori to the New Zealand Parliament following their defeat at the 2017 general election.

Born and raised in the eastern Bay of Plenty, Waititi traces his lineage to many iwi but has firm links to Te Whānau-ā-Apanui and Ngāti Porou. An advocate of progressive political policies, Waititi is a fluent Māori speaker, and is also an iwi leader, Ringatū minister, and kapa haka exponent. He has been prominent and vocal in his opposition to the policies towards Māori of the Sixth National Government of New Zealand since the 2023 general election.

== Personal life ==
Waititi was born in Ōpōtiki, the eldest of four children. His birthday is 17 October. He spent his first 12 years living in Whangaparāoa, in the eastern Bay of Plenty near Cape Runaway, and was schooled under the guidance of his kaumātua (elders) and his hapū, Te Whānau a Kauaetangohia. There he went to kōhanga reo and Te Kura Mana Māori o Whangaparāoa, before he moved to West Auckland when he was 13 to live with his paternal aunt, June Mariu, in Te Atatū North (now Te Atatū Peninsula). He did his secondary schooling at Rutherford High School (now Rutherford College) alongside another politician, Simon Bridges.

Waititi is of the Te Whānau-ā-Apanui, Ngāi Tai, Te Whakatōhea, Ngāi Tūhoe, Ngāti Awa, Te Arawa, Ngāti Tūwharetoa, Ngāi Te Rangi and Ngāti Ranginui iwi, and also has "firm links" to Ngāti Porou. He is a father of five and husband to Kiri Tamihere-Waititi, the daughter of John Tamihere. He is the grandnephew of Hoani Waititi.

== Political career ==
New Zealand Parliament
Years	Term	Electorate	List	Party
2020–2023	53rd	Waiariki	2	Te Pāti Māori
2023–2026	54th	Waiariki	2	Te Pāti Māori
2026–present	55th	Waiariki		Te Pāti Māori

=== Labour Party, 2014–2016 ===
In the 2014 election, Waititi ran for the Labour Party in Waiariki. As he was not placed on the Labour Party list, his only way to Parliament was to win Waiariki, however, he lost the seat of Waiariki to Māori Party co-leader Te Ururoa Flavell.

=== Defection to the Māori Party ===
In 2016, following Kīngi Tūheitia Paki's speech backing the Māori Party, Waititi announced he would be supporting the Māori Party.

=== 2020 general election ===
On 23 February 2020, Waititi was announced as the Māori Party candidate for Waiariki for the 2020 election. Following his nomination, Waititi said that there was "an imminent need, now more than ever that Māori have a voice who solely prioritises their aspirations and their needs and that is unapologetic about doing so. The Māori Party is the only party who can do that." He was endorsed by Te Kapa Haka o Te Whānau a Apanui.

At the 2020 election, Waititi successfully unseated the Labour MP Tāmati Coffey, winning by 836 votes, and became the MP for Waiariki.

The final election results showed that the Māori Party had won 1.2% of the party vote, entitling them to two seats, so Waititi's electorate win meant not only his entry to Parliament, but also that of female co-leader Debbie Ngarewa-Packer. Of the forty-two new MPs elected to the 53rd Parliament, two are from the Māori Party.

Under the Māori Party's constitution, its co-leaders must be drawn from its MPs first, with one male and one female co-leader. At a special general meeting of the party on 28 October 2020, Waititi was confirmed as the male co-leader, replacing his father-in-law, John Tamihere.

=== First term, 2020–2023 ===
Before being sworn in to the 53rd parliament, Waititi performed a waerea to protest being required to pledge allegiance to Queen Elizabeth II without reference to the Treaty of Waitangi. On 26 November, Waititi and Ngarewa-Packer walked out of Parliament after the Speaker of the House Trevor Mallard declined his motion that the Māori Party be allowed to speak for 15 minutes during the opening on Parliament on the grounds that MPs from smaller parties were not scheduled to deliver their maiden speeches until the following week. Waititi described Mallard's decision and the parliamentary system as unfair.

In late December 2020 and early January, Waititi participated in negotiations with 16 prisoners who were involved in unrest at Waikeria Prison stemming from allegations of inhumane and unhygienic conditions at the prison. Several of the prisoners had requested the presence of a Māori leader such as Waititi as a prerequisite to ending the unrest. He stated, "these men belong to whanau... that they deserve the right to be treated humanely, with fresh water, food and clean clothing and they deserve to have someone advocating for them." Following five days of unrest, the prisoners surrendered to the authorities following negotiations involving Waititi.

On 9 February, Waititi was ejected from the debating chamber by Speaker Mallard for refusing to wear a necktie in line with Parliament's business attire dress core. Waititi instead wore a hei tiki necklace, which he described as Māori business attire. Waititi had earlier criticised wearing neckties, describing them as "colonial noose[s]" during his maiden speech last year. When Waititi attempted to ask Corrections Minister Kelvin Davis a supplementary question, Mallard denied him permission to speak since he was not wearing a tie. When Waititi sought a point of order, Mallard ordered him to leave. Waititi was supported by fellow Māori Party MP Ngarewa-Packer, who wore a tie in mockery of the rules. The following day, a Standing Orders meeting accepted a Māori Party submission proposing the elimination of neckties from Parliament's business attire. As a result, Mallard announced that it would no longer be compulsory to wear ties in the chamber.

On 12 May, Waititi was ejected from parliamentary proceedings following a heated argument with the opposition National Party leader Judith Collins about the proposed creation of a Māori Health Authority. In the past two weeks, National had alleged the Labour Government was promoting a "separatist agenda" through the Māori Health Authority and other policies seeking to fulfil partnership responsibilities under the Treaty of Waitangi. Waititi accused Collins of racism and sought to raise a point of order about indigenous rights. When his point of order was denied by the Speaker Mallard, Waititi performed a haka in protest, prompting the Speaker to order him to leave Parliament for the rest of the afternoon. Waititi left with Māori Party co-leader Ngarewa-Packer and Green MP Teanau Tuiono, who expressed solidarity with him.

In October 2021, Waititi criticised the Government's abandonment of its previous COVID-19 elimination strategy and expressed concerns that the new COVID-19 Protection Framework was insufficient in protecting Māori and boosting the Māori vaccination rate.

In September 2022, Waititi and fellow Māori Party MP Ngarewa-Packer voted against the Queen Elizabeth II Memorial Day Act 2022, which created a once-off public holiday on 26 September to commemorate the death of Elizabeth II. Waititi objected to the holiday on the grounds that no similar event had taken place for any deceased Māori leaders and claimed it was "example of colonialism in practice". Waititi further stated after a week of avoiding commenting on republicanism that New Zealand "must acknowledge the brutal genocidal and ongoing impact of colonialism, of the imperial project that was overseen by the House of Windsor and its forebears". Waititi's remarks were criticised as insensitive and disrespectful by National Party MPs Michael Woodhouse and Judith Collins.

In May 2023, Waititi and Ngarewa-Packer were ordered to leave Parliament by Speaker Adrian Rurawhe after they staged a haka (dance) to welcome former Labour MP Meka Whaitiri. The Māori Party caucus had not sought permission from the Speaker or other parties to hold the haka.

In mid July 2023, Waititi joked about poisoning ACT Party leader David Seymour during Te Pati Māori's annual conference. While referring to the karaka seedpod necklace around his neck, Waititi said: "These are karaka berries and they've still got the poison in them. So next time I go into Parliament this is what I'm going to do. When David Seymour's not looking, I'm going to go like this into his water... There you are, re-indigenise yourself with some native seeds." Waititi's remarks were condemned by Seymour, who demanded an apology.

On 29 August 2023, Waititi was suspended from Parliament for 24 hours after referring to suppressed court proceedings while asking a question during parliamentary proceedings. Though Waititi asked the question under parliamentary privilege, his reference to the court proceedings breached two parliamentary Standing Orders. In addition, Speaker Rurawhe referred a "general question" of breaching court suppressions to Parliament's Privileges Committee. As punishment, Waititi was barred from voting, sitting on a committee or entering the debating chamber for 24 hours. On 28 August 2024, Parliament's Privileges Committee chairperson Judith Collins upheld Speaker Rurawhe's disciplinary action against Waititi for breaching the court suppression order, stating "that free speech came with a responsibility not to frustrate the court's jurisdiction."

During an interview with TVNZ journalist Jack Tame 10 September 2023, Waititi advocated a wealth tax and removing GST from food, defended Te Aka Whai Ora (the Māori Health Authority), and advocated a policy of neutrality. Waititi also denied that his party's sports policy' comments about "Māori genetic makeup being stronger than others" were racist. These comments were subsequently deleted from Te Pāti Māori's website. When challenged by Tame, he said that Te Pāti Māori was "trying to empower people that are climbing out from the bottom of the bonnet of colonial violence for the last 193 years" by encouraging pride in their heritage.

=== Second term, 2023–2026 ===
In the 2023 general election, Waititi again contested the Waiariki electorate. He received 21,500 votes out of 28,958 for an outright majority. Waititi performed a haka in the chamber prior to swearing his oath of allegiance to King Charles III.

In mid-December 2023, Waititi retained his position as Te Pāti Māori co-leader and joined Parliament's finance & expenditure select committee. He also became the party's finance, economic development, trade & enterprise, revenue, procurement, defence, foreign affairs, intelligence, Māori performance arts, and arts, culture & heritage spokesperson.

In mid-March 2024, Waititi introduced a member's bill to amend the Goods and Services Tax Act to remove the Goods and Services Tax from all food products and non-alcohol products. The bill was defeated at its first reading on 22 March 2024, with only Te Pāti Māori supporting it.

On 14 November 2024, Waititi along with Ngarewa-Packer and Labour MP Peeni Henare joined fellow Te Pāti Māori MP Hana-Rawhiti Maipi-Clarke in performing an impromptu protest haka (Ka Mate), which disrupted parliamentary proceedings during the first reading of the Treaty Principles Bill. On 10 December, Waititi and the other three MPs were referred to Parliament's Privileges Committee for their involvement in the haka.

On 1 April 2025, Waititi, Ngarewa-Packer and Maipi-Clarke declined to appear before the Privileges Committee, claiming they had been denied key legal rights such as a joint hearing, restrictions on their legal representation Christopher Finlayson, expert testimony from tikanga (Māori culture) expert Tā Pou Temara denied, hearing scheduling conflicts being ignored and concerns about disciplinary action against Maipi-Clarke. On 2 April, the Privileges Committee's chairperson Judith Collins confirmed that the privileges hearing would go ahead regardless of whether the three TPM MPs turned up. In response, Waititi and Ngarewa-Packer announced that Te Pāti Māori would boycott the hearing and hold its own "alternative independent hearing", dismissing the Privileges Committee as a "kangaroo court".

On 14 May 2025, the Privileges Committee censured Waititi and his colleagues for "acting in a manner that could have the effect of intimidating a member of the House in the discharge of their duty" during the haka protest. He and Ngarewa-Packer were suspended from Parliament for 21 days while Maipi-Clarke was suspended for a week. Te Pāti Māori issued a statement denouncing the verdict as "the worst punishment handed down ever in our history". On 20 May 2025, Parliament adopted Leader of the House Chris Bishop's motion that the parliamentary debate on the TPM MPs' suspension be delayed until 5 June, allowing them to participate in the budget debate on 22 May. On 5 June, parliament voted to suspend Maipi-Clarke for 7 days, and Ngarewa-Packer and Waititi for 21 days.

A RNZ-Reid Research poll found that, a majority supported the punishment or thought it should be stronger. 37.0% said it was "about right"; 17.2% said it was "too lenient", and 36.2% said it was "too harsh".

=== Third term, 2026–present ===
During the 2026 New Zealand general election held on 7 November, Waititi contested the Waiariki electorate. His party also opted to stand seven candidates within the Māori electorates, telling their supporters to give their party votes to the Labour and Green parties. Based on preliminary results, Waititi retained the Waiariki electorate for Te Pāti Māori by a margin of 2,274 votes.

== Views and positions ==
=== Abortion ===
Waititi voted in favour of the Contraception, Sterilisation, and Abortion (Safe Areas) Amendment Act 2022, which established safe zones around abortion providers.

=== Conversion therapy ===
Waititi has supported the Conversion Practices Prohibition Legislation Act 2022, which banned conversion therapy. During the Bill's first reading in August 2022, he claimed that conversion therapy was based on European colonial ideas about gender and sexuality that were alien to Māori people.

=== Russian invasion of Ukraine ===
In March 2022, Waititi supported the Russia Sanctions Act 2022, which created an autonomous sanctions regime in response to the 2022 Russian invasion of Ukraine. While condemning the Russian invasion of Ukraine, he also questioned New Zealand's failure to condemn the United States' invasions of Afghanistan and Iraq, and the Israeli occupation of Palestine.

He later called the conflict a "proxy war for the United States", stating that New Zealand should stay out of the conflict. He said that New Zealand was acting like a puppet state of the United States, a statement that saw disagreement from then Prime Minister Jacinda Ardern and other political leaders across the aisle. He supported a position of neutrality. In a Facebook post on 21 March 2023, he stated that New Zealand should be the "Switzerland of the South Pacific", saying (in reference to the conflict) that Māori should not fight "other indigenous peoples on their whenua".

=== Self-governance ===
In February 2024, Waititi has advocated for Māori self-governance, stating that Māori have a right to govern themselves. He has also called for the establishment of a Māori Parliament.

New Zealand Parliament
Preceded by Tāmati Coffey	Member of Parliament for Waiariki; 2020–present	Incumbent
Party political offices
Preceded by John Tamihere	Co-leader of the Māori Party; 2020–present Served alongside: Debbie Ngarewa-Packer	Incumbent
