= Māori Women's Welfare League =

New Zealand welfare organisation

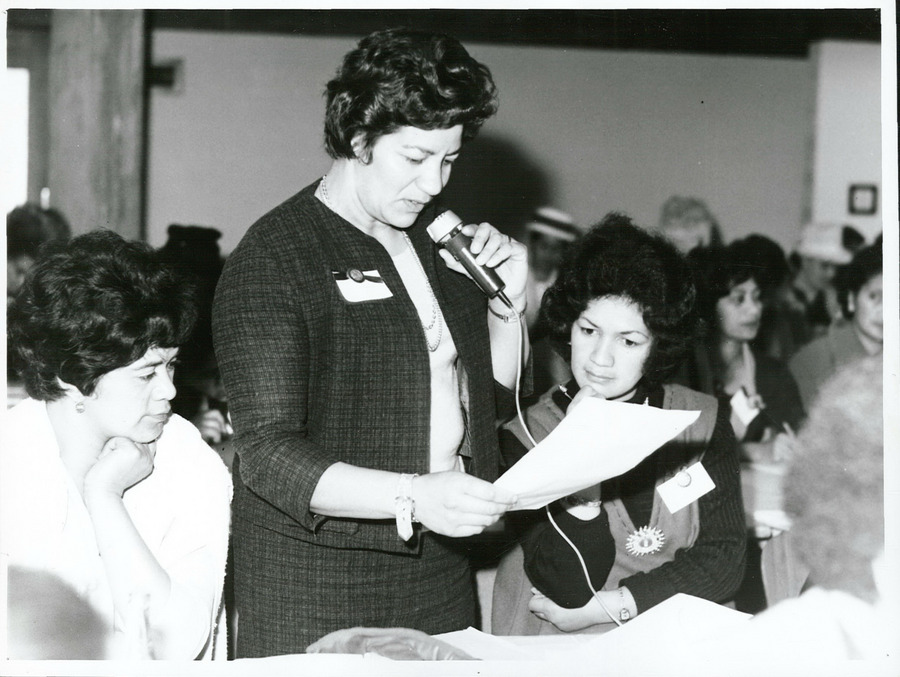
1965 Dominion Conference

The Māori Women’s Welfare League or Te Rōpū Wāhine Māori Toko I te Ora is a New Zealand welfare organisation focusing on Māori women and children. It held its first conference in Wellington in September 1951.

The league's official aims are "To promote fellowship and understanding between Māori and European women and to cooperate with other women's organisations, Departments of State, and local bodies for the furtherance of these objects."

== History and accomplishments ==
The formation of the league was a milestone in Māori culture. Through the organisation, women were able to represent themselves in the New Zealand government for the first time. Formed in 1951 in Wellington, following the mass movement of Māori from rural to urban New Zealand, the league's original goal was to preserve Māori culture through their native arts and crafts while also promoting fellowship and cooperation among various women’s organisations. The league's formation was a direct result of the 1945 Māori Social and Economic Advancement Act. The mostly male members of the committee for social and economic advancement recognised the under-representation of women in government and created the Women's Welfare League to address this issue. Dame Whina Cooper was elected foundation president. Following its establishment, the league grew rapidly, with branches established throughout New Zealand. Within its first 14 years of existence, membership had risen to approximately 3,000 members in branches across the country.

The league became heavily involved in housing, health, and education, focusing on families and healthy lifestyles in addition to women's issues. When founded, the league had 187 branches; by 1956 it had 300 branches, 88 district councils and over 4,000 members. As president, Dame Whina Cooper became the highest profile Māori woman in New Zealand. Cooper, however, was acting in consultation with the league's executive less and less, and in 1957 she was persuaded to step down as president. The league's annual conference bestowed her the title "Te Whaea o te Motu" (Mother of the Nation) in 1958. In the early days of the organisation its priorities were poverty reduction and adequate public housing for the community. In the 1960s, the women's league developed an afterschool homework programme and established Māori language schools. By the 1980s because of this type of action the organisation was able to persuade the government into making te reo Māori part of the country's official languages.

== Māori Women's Development Incorporated ==
In 1987 the league, under the leadership of Dame Georgina Kirby, established the Māori Women's Development Inc (MWDI), a specialist lender to encourage innovation and business among Māori. The fund lends to women and their whānau, and is run and governed by women.

== Notable figures ==
Some of the people with the league include:

=== Patrons ===
- Te Ariki Te Puea Herangi – founding patroness 1951–??
- Te Arikinui Dame Te Atairangikaahu – patroness ??–2006
- Te Makau Ariki Atawhai Paki – patroness 2007–present

=== Presidents ===
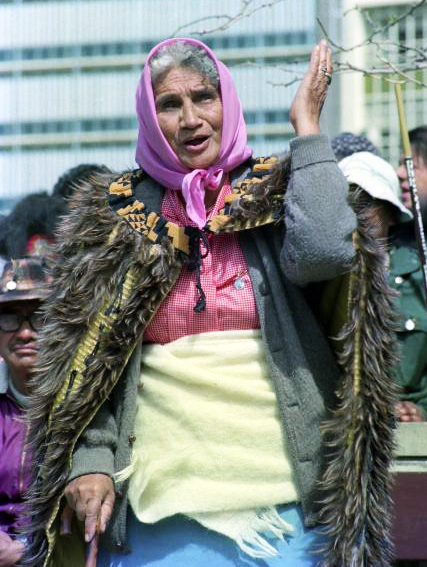
Dame Whina Cooper in 1975

- Dame Whina Cooper, ONZ, DBE, JP, president 1951–1957 (founding president)
- Mīria Logan, MBE president 1957–1960
- Maata Hirini, MBE ME foundation president 1960–1963
- Ruiha Sage, JP president 1964–1968
- Mīria Karauria, MBE president 1968–1971
- Hine Potaka, OBE Dominion president 1971–1973
- Dame Miraka Szaszy DBE, JP president 1973–1977
- Dr Erihapeti Rehu-Murchie CNZM, QSO, JP, president 1977–1980
- Violet Pou, CBE, president 1980–1983
- Maraea Te Kawa. QSM, JP president 1983
- Dame Georgina Kirby, DBE, QSO, JP president 1983–1987; MWDI trustee
- Dame June Mariu, DNZM, CNZM, QSM, JP, president 1987–1990; MWDI trustee
- Dame Aroha Reriti-Crofts, CBE, JP, president 1990–1993; MWDI trustee
- Dame Areta Koopu, CBE president 1993–1996; MWDI trustee
- Druis Barrett CNZM president 1996–1999; MWDI trustee
- Jacqui Te Kani CNZM president 1999–2002; later general manager for the Maori Women's Welfare League (died in office in 2012); MWDI Trustee
- Kitty Bennett MNZM president; MWDI trustee
- Linda Grennell president; MWDI trustee
- Meagan Joe 2008–2011 (died in office); MWDI trustee
- Kataraina O'Brien president 2011–2014
- Prue Kapua president 2014–2022
- Dr Hope Tupara president 2022–present

=== Life members ===
- Te Paekiomeka Joy Ruha, ONZM, QSM. Life member and te reo Māori activist.
- Dame Iritana Tāwhiwhirangi, DNZM, MBE. Life member and te reo Māori activist.
- Kahu Hurihia Durie, QSM. Life member.
- Phyllis Hilet. Life member.
- Anne Delamere, DCNZM, QSO. Life member.

== Recent developments ==
The organisation's recent focus has been on inspiring Māori women to consider the more non-traditional areas of work. The Modern Apprenticeship Program was designed to promote cross-fertilisation within the traditional male and female roles. While it was once important to preserve the old Māori ways of life, leaders within the league today see more benefits in a transition. By combining women and men in the workforce the league hopes to close the pay gap. Almost 70% of women's work is unpaid compared to 40% of male's work. Another recent initiative has been to set housing as one of New Zealand's priorities.

The organisation continues to have an annual conference and is heavily involved in social issues within New Zealand, especially relating to Māori health and education. Today, the league does more than give women a voice in government; it is responsible for immunisation campaigns for babies and teaching young mothers about gardening and growing their own food. The league also seeks to provide health centres and nursing units for the community. The league has become an organisation which focuses less on women and more on family wellness and the wellness of the community.

Recent initiatives have led to new socially concerned organisations including the Pouta Training Centre. The centre provides programs teaching things vital to basic health, such as quitting smoking. The welfare league is also currently battling a sexist backlash, as it continues to exhibit the power women can hold in saving and nurturing a culture.

Traditional health issues such as childcare and infant mortality continue to feature in the league's programs alongside more recent developments such as anti-smoking campaigns; home vegetable growing initiatives such as Kai in the yard and child car seat campaigns. Many campaigns are centred or hosted on marae (the community-centre in most small Māori communities) and often involve working with health care professionals or other organisations such as Plunket Society or District Health Boards to extend their work into Māori communities.

=== 2011 elections ===
In 2011, Hannah Tamaki, Auckland based co-founder of the Destiny Church campaigned for presidency of the league. Since Tamaki joined the league five years previously, the church created several branches of the league within the church. The league distributed voting papers without Tamaki's name and announced that some branches and some members were being investigated. Tamaki launched legal action in the High Court.

Ten of thirteen self-identified Destiny branches were constituted at the same time at the Destiny Church's headquarters in Mt Wellington after Hannah Tamaki's nomination. Each of the ten had between 91 and 93 members, apparently to maximise the number of votes. Justice Kos ruled that Tamaki should be reinstated as a candidate in the election, but that the ten recently constituted branches were not legally constituted and should not be able to vote in the election because they had been established completely contrary to the practices and tikanga of the league.

Days after the court decision, then-president Meagan (Wowie) Joe died, after a long battle with breast cancer. Tamaki maintained her campaign for president.

Kataraina O'Brien, a 40-year veteran of the league won the election. O'Brien has 12 years experience on the Tainui Regional Executive Board of the league and has been the president of the Matua branch for the past 8 years. She is active in the Merivale area of Tauranga and was a finalist in the Tauranga Community Spirit Awards in November 2008 O'Brien is a teacher by profession, having taught at Hato Petera and Auckland Girls' Grammar.

In June 2012, the league's national executive banned Tamaki from holding regional office for three years and disestablished the three remaining league branches associated with her and the Destiny Church. Tamaki announced she would not appeal the ban but was considering setting up a rival organisation.
