= Mira Szászy =

New Zealand Māori leader and academic

Dame Mira Szászy DBE JP

7th President of the Māori Women's Welfare League
- In office 1973–1977
- Preceded by: Hine Pōtaka
- Succeeded by: Erihapeti Rehu Murchie

Personal details
- Born: Miraka Petricevich; 7 August 1921
- Died: 20 December 2001 (aged 80)

Dame Miraka Szászy DBE JP (née Petricevich; 7 August 1921 – 20 December 2001) was a prominent Māori leader in New Zealand, who made significant contributions in education, broadcasting, social welfare and small business development.

== Biography ==
Mira Petricevich was the first Māori woman to graduate with a degree from the University of Auckland – Bachelor of Arts, Dip SocSci. She was then the first Māori woman to win a fellowship to the University of Hawaiʻi. After returning to New Zealand, she joined the Ministry of Maori Affairs as a welfare officer.

In 1951, she was involved in the establishment of the Māori Women's Welfare League (Te Ropu Wahine Maori Toko i te Ora) and was appointed secretary of its first executive. Between 1973 and 1977, Szászy was president of the organisation. In the early 1960s, she had represented the League on the board of the Māori Education Foundation.

Alongside campaigning for the Māori, Szászy championed the cause of women, recalling how she became aware of 'the oppression of women as well as of Māori when she began working in a government department, and having observed "job discrimination" within the department.' Like Dame Whina Cooper, Szászy felt keenly the injustice that resulted from some iwi preventing women from speaking upon the marae ātea, despite possessing an eloquence "as good as, if not better than that of the men I listened to." Her dedication to achieving equality for Māori women was acknowledged in tributes after her death. The then-Prime Minister, Helen Clark, said, "In addition to her role as an advocate and worker for Māoridom, she was a tireless champion on behalf of women, and, in particular, to advance the status of Māori women."

She began her career as a teacher in 1946, and in 1972, became a lecturer in Māori Studies at Auckland Secondary Teachers' Training College (now Auckland College of Education).

In the 1978 New Year Honours, Szászy was appointed a Commander of the Order of the British Empire for services to the community and Māori people. She was promoted to Dame Commander of the Order of the British Empire in the 1990 New Year Honours, for services to the community.

In 1993, she received an Honorary Doctor of Laws from Victoria University of Wellington in recognition of her contribution to the nation. Also in 1993, she was awarded the New Zealand Suffrage Centennial Medal.

== Personal life ==
Szászy was born in Waihopo, Northland, in 1921, of Ngāti Kurī, Te Rarawa, and Te Aupōuri descent. Her parents were Lovro Petricevich, a Dalmatian gum digger, and Makareta Raharuhi.

She married Albert Szászy, an Aucklander of Hungarian heritage in 1956; they had two sons, Philip and Mark.

== Death ==
Szászy died at home in Ngataki, aged 80, in 2001.

== Legacy ==
The Mira Szászy Research Centre was established by the University of Auckland Business School in 1998 in honour of Szászy's achievements; the centre is New Zealand's first dedicated Māori and Pacific research facility in business and economics. The Dame Mira Szászy Māori Alumni Award recognises "outstanding achievement by graduates of the University of Auckland Business School, and excellence in iwi and business endeavours nationwide and internationally." As of 2024, the director of the centre is Maree Roche. In 2017, Szászy was selected as one of the Royal Society Te Apārangi's "150 women in 150 words", celebrating the contributions of women to knowledge in New Zealand.
