= Erihana Ryan =

20th- and 21st-century Māori psychiatrist

Erihana Rūpene Ryan (née Reuben) is a New Zealand psychiatrist.

== Biography ==
Ryan was born in Tuahiwi, north of Christchurch, and lived at the pā there until the age of 17. She was the fourth child of eight born to Te Marino (a Ngāi Tahu returned serviceman and freezing worker) and Bernice Reuben (a university-educated Pākehā homemaker). She left high school after four years to work as a hospital laboratory assistant, then seven years later applied for support from the Ngāi Tahu Māori Trust Board to attend medical school in Dunedin. On graduating, she moved to Wellington and worked at Porirua Hospital in general medicine before deciding to specialise in psychiatry. In the 1980s Ryan was involved in the Mason Inquiries with Ken Mason and also worked for the Waitangi Tribunal.

In the early 1990s Ryan moved back to Christchurch and was appointed the clinical director of Te Korowai Atawhai, the Māori Mental Health team in Christchurch. In 1996 she was appointed to the board of Ngāi Tahu Development Corporation, and the following year she became chair. In 2001 she was appointed to the Ministry of Health's Health Workforce Advisory Committee.

=== Recognition ===
In 2004, Ryan received the Dr Maarire Goodall Award acknowledging her contributions to Māori health.
