= Hoani Waititi =

New Zealand teacher and community leader

Hoani Retimana Waititi
- Parents: Kuaha Waititi (father); Kirimatao Waititi (nee Kerei) (mother)
- Relatives: Dame June Mariu (niece); Rawiri Waititi (grand-nephew); Kahurangi Waititi (niece); Taika Waititi (relative)

Hoani Retimana Waititi (12 April 1926 – 30 September 1965) was a notable New Zealand teacher, educationalist and community leader. Of Māori descent, he identified with the Te Whānau-ā-Apanui iwi. He worked as a teacher and in other areas of education. He died of cancer at the age of 39. Hoani Waititi Marae in West Auckland is named in his honour.

== Personal life ==
Waititi was born in Whangaparaoa near Cape Runaway, Bay of Plenty, New Zealand, in 1926. His mother was Kirimātao Heremia Kerei and his father was Kūaha Waititi, a farmer. Both parents were from the Te Whānau-a-Kauaetangohia hapū of Te Whānau-ā-Apanui.

As a child, Waititi attended the Cape Runaway School, then St Stephen’s School, where he received a scholarship to attend Te Aute College. When he was 17 he passed a extramural Māori course through Victoria University College.

Waititi lied about his age to begin training with the Royal New Zealand Air Force in February 1944. He transferred to the Māori Battalion a year later, and served in Italy, before travelling to Japan with J Force. He was discharged in October 1946.

After the war, he trained as a teacher in 1947–48. In 1949 he taught at Te Kaha Māori District High School and at Nūhaka Māori School in Hawke’s Bay. From 1949-1957 he primarily taught at St Stephen's, but also taught te reo Māori at the Queen Victoria School for Maori Girls and Auckland Girls' Grammar School. He received a BA from the University of Auckland in 1955.

== Notable relations ==
June Mariu is his niece, the daughter of his older brother Manihera. Rawiri Waititi is his great-nephew.
