= Tuahiwi =

Village in Canterbury, New Zealand

- Village
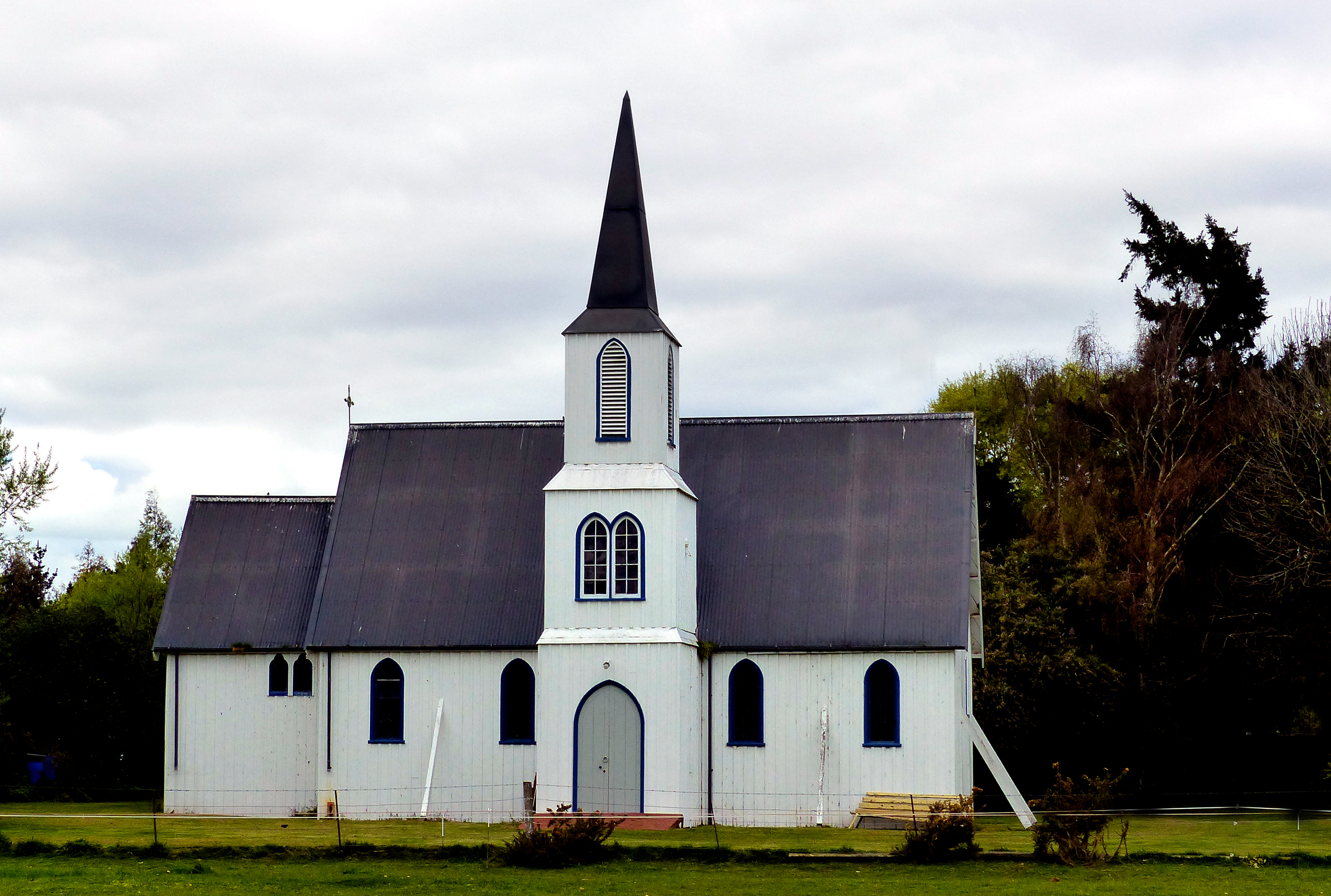
- St Stephen’s Anglican Church
- Interactive map of Tuahiwi
- Coordinates: 43°20′S 172°39′E
- Country: New Zealand
- Region: Canterbury
- District: Waimakariri District
- Ward: Rangiora-Ashley Ward; Kaiapoi-Woodend Ward
- Community: Rangiora-Ashley Community; Kaiapoi-Woodend Community
- Electorates: Waimakariri; Te Tai Tonga (Māori)

Government
  - Territorial Authority: Waimakariri District Council
  - Regional council: Environment Canterbury
  - Mayor of Waimakariri: Dan Gordon
  - Waimakariri MP: Matt Doocey
  - Te Tai Tonga MP: Tākuta Ferris

Area
  - Total: 22.71 km^{2} (8.77 sq mi)

Population (June 2025)
  - Total: 1,000
  - Density: 44/km^{2} (110/sq mi)
- Time zone: UTC+12 (NZST)
  - Summer (DST): UTC+13 (NZDT)

Tuahiwi is a small New Zealand settlement located between Woodend and Rangiora. It is 6 kilometres (3.7 mi) north of Kaiapoi.

== History ==
=== Pre-European ===
Tuahiwi is the modern day primary domicile of Ngāi Tūahuriri hapū of Ngāi Tahu. In 1831, prior to European settlement, this pā, and the main Kaiapoi Pā nearby had been attacked by Te Rauparaha in a revenge raid (utu). Following a protracted siege which saw Kaiapoi Pā razed and subsequently abandoned, Tuahiwi became the central Ngāi Tūāhuriri pā. The site was reserved for Māori in 1848 by Walter Mantell following the signing of Kemp's Deed. Meanwhile, a new European settlement arose along the banks of the north branch of the Waimakariri River, named Kaiapoi.

=== Development ===
The carved meeting house Tūtekawa that almost burnt down in 1870 succumbed to fire in 1879. Significant colonial developments included the establishment of a Māori mission, which included a church, Saint Stephen's, built in 1867 with its foundation stone having been laid by Governor George Grey on his visit to the settlement.

In 1890, Tuahiwi was described as having a neat village of Māori residences. The old whare had been replaced by fenced cottages with gardens. A school, the Anglican church and country meeting hall functioning as a wharenui, were in the centre of the community. The Native Land Court used the hall from time to time.

=== Events ===
In 1900 the Tuahiwi hall was used as a base by D Company of the 1st North Canterbury Mounted Rifle Battalion, a volunteer unit. The Mounted Rifles included Tuahiwi Māori who protested to the Premier Richard Seddon in 1901 on being refused permission to fight in the Second Boer War .

Reginald Koettlitz and a number of members of Scott's Discovery Expedition made a goodwill visit to Tuahiwi in December 1901 prior to the expedition's departure from Lyttelton for Antarctica.

== Demographics ==
The Tuahiwi statistical area covers 22.71 km^{2} (8.77 sq mi). It had an estimated population of 1,000 as of June 2025, with a population density of 44 people per km^{2}.

Historical population
Year	Pop.	±% p.a.
2006	858	—
2013	963	+1.66%
2018	945	−0.38%
2023	969	+0.50%

Tuahiwi had a population of 969 in the 2023 New Zealand census, an increase of 24 people (2.5%) since the 2018 census, and an increase of 6 people (0.6%) since the 2013 census. There were 498 males, 468 females, and 3 people of other genders in 339 dwellings. 3.1% of people identified as LGBTIQ+. The median age was 45.8 years (compared with 38.1 years nationally). There were 156 people (16.1%) aged under 15 years, 159 (16.4%) aged 15 to 29, 495 (51.1%) aged 30 to 64, and 153 (15.8%) aged 65 or older.

People could identify as more than one ethnicity. The results were 87.0% European (Pākehā); 22.6% Māori; 1.5% Pasifika; 3.7% Asian; 0.6% Middle Eastern, Latin American and African New Zealanders (MELAA); and 3.1% other, which includes people giving their ethnicity as "New Zealander". English was spoken by 98.5%, Māori by 5.6%, and other languages by 5.3%. No language could be spoken by 1.2% (e.g. too young to talk). New Zealand Sign Language was known by 0.3%. The percentage of people born overseas was 14.6, compared with 28.8% nationally.

Religious affiliations were 25.7% Christian, 0.3% Hindu, 0.3% Islam, 2.5% Māori religious beliefs, 0.3% Buddhist, 1.2% New Age, 0.3% Jewish, and 0.6% other religions. People who answered that they had no religion were 62.2%, and 7.1% of people did not answer the census question.

Of those at least 15 years old, 126 (15.5%) people had a bachelor's or higher degree, 495 (60.9%) had a post-high school certificate or diploma, and 189 (23.2%) people exclusively held high school qualifications. The median income was $41,900, compared with $41,500 nationally. 87 people (10.7%) earned over $100,000 compared to 12.1% nationally. The employment status of those at least 15 was 423 (52.0%) full-time, 129 (15.9%) part-time, and 15 (1.8%) unemployed.

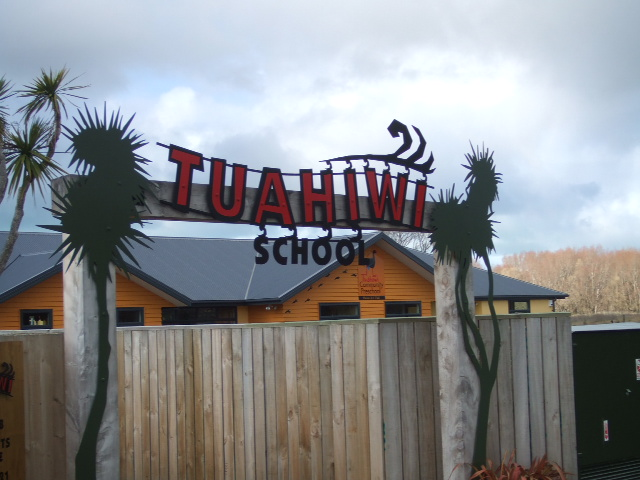
Tuahiwi School

== Education ==
Te Kura o Tuahiwi is a full primary state school, covering years 1 to 8, with 183 students (as of July 2026). The school is bilingual, offering students a choice of tuition in Māori-language or English education. A Mission school opened in 1863, and was the beginning of government-supported education. Tuahiwi School celebrated its centenary in 1963 and Te Kura o Tuahiwi celebrated 150 years in 2013.

== Notable people ==
- Aroha Reriti-Crofts - Community worker
- Erihana Ryan - Māori psychiatrist
- Wiremu Nahira Te-hoika - a Māori chief born about 1812 at Kaiapoi who moved to Tuahiwi in 1850, where he died in February 1903
