= Areta Koopu =

New Zealand social worker and Māori activist (born 1941)

Dame Areta Koopu DNZM CBE
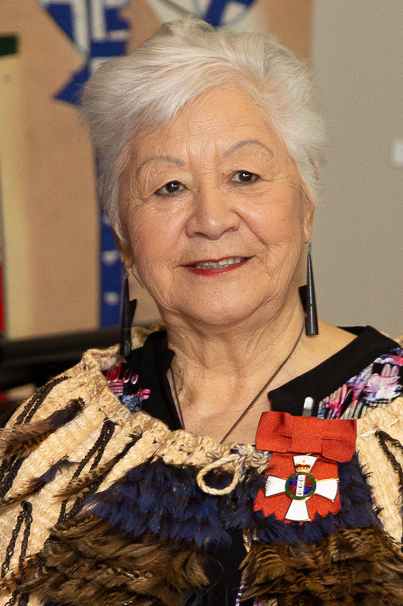
- Koopu in 2019

14th President of the Māori Women's Welfare League
- In office 1993–1996
- Preceded by: Aroha Reriti-Crofts
- Succeeded by: Druis Barrett

Personal details
- Born: Areta King; 8 March 1941 (age 85) Gisborne, New Zealand
- Spouse: Hoera Koopu (m. 1961)
- Children: 5

Dame Areta Koopu DNZM CBE (née King; born 8 March 1941) is a New Zealand social worker and Māori activist.

== Biography ==
Koopu was born in Gisborne on 8 March 1941, the daughter of Wiremu and Ngaro Alice King. She was educated at Gisborne Girls' High School, and married Hoera Koopu in 1961. The couple went on to have five children.

Koopu worked as an independent mediator for the Housing Corporation and as a national trainer of the Family Court. She was a member of the New Zealand Māori Council from 1987 to 1992, National President of the Māori Women's Welfare League from 1993 to 1996, and succeeded Erihapeti Murchie as Human Rights Commissioner from 1996 to 2001. In these roles she visited indigenous communities and attended conferences across the globe on behalf of New Zealand, such as attending a conference of the Sami people in Northern Europe and meeting Native Hawai'ians.

In the 1994 Queen's Birthday Honours, Koopu was appointed a Commander of the Order of the British Empire, for services to the community. In the 2019 Queen's Birthday Honours, she was appointed Dame Companion of the New Zealand Order of Merit, for services to Māori and the community. Koopu is also a recipient of the New Zealand Suffrage Centennial Medal 1993.

In 2023 Koopu was made a life member of Te Ao Marama, the New Zealand Māori Dental Association. She has also served with the Māori Education Trust and Te Kōhanga Reo National Trust.
