= Kahurangi Waititi =

New Zealand netball player (born 1982)

Personal information
- Born: 22 September 1982 (age 43)
- Height: 1.84 m (6 ft 0 in)

Netball career
- Playing positions: GK, GD
Years	Club team	Apps
2008	Central Pulse	
2009	Canterbury Tactix	

Kahurangi Waititi (born 22 September 1982) is a New Zealand netball player in the ANZ Championship. She signed with the Central Pulse for the 2008 season, but has been signed to play for the Canterbury Tactix in 2009.
