= New Zealand Suffrage Centennial Medal 1993 =

- Type: Commemorative medal
- Awarded for: A recognised contribution to the rights of women in New Zealand, and/or to women's issues in New Zealand
- Country: New Zealand
- Presented by: Queen of New Zealand
- Eligibility: New Zealand and Commonwealth citizens
- Status: Only awarded in 1993
- Established: 1 July 1993

Highlights
- Total: 544
- Ribbon of the medal

Precedence
- Next (higher): New Zealand 1990 Commemoration Medal
- Next (lower): New Zealand Meritorious Service Medal

The New Zealand Suffrage Centennial Medal 1993 was established by Royal Warrant on 1 July 1993. It was created to commemorate Women's suffrage in New Zealand and to recognize those New Zealand and Commonwealth citizens who had made a significant contribution to women's rights or women's issues in New Zealand. The medal was only awarded in 1993.

== Background ==
Women's suffrage in New Zealand was achieved by the passage of the Electoral Act 1893 on 19 September 1893. To commemorate the centennial of that event the medal was created. The medal served to recognize New Zealanders and other Commonwealth citizens who had made a significant or recognisable contribution to the rights of women or to women's issues within New Zealand. The medal was awarded to 544 men and women.

== Design ==
The medal is circular, struck in bronze with an antique finish. The obverse depicts the crowned effigy of Queen Elizabeth II. The reverse bears the inscription "1893 The New Zealand Suffrage Centennial 1993". The inscription is wreathed by a fern frond and a sprig of camellia foliage with a single flower. The stems of each are crossed and tied with a bow at the base.

The medal is suspended from a ribbon 32 mm wide. The ribbon is purple with three narrow stripes of white, yellow, and white in the center. When worn by a woman the medal may be suspended by the ribbon shaped into a bow.

The medal was designed by Phillip O'Shea, New Zealand Herald of Arms Extraordinary, and was struck by the Royal Australian Mint.

== Notable recipients ==
- Jill Amos – politician, activist
- Mary Batchelor – politician, advocate for women's equality
- Dorothy Buchanan – composer and teacher
- Helen Clark – politician
- Joy Cowley – author
- Lowell Goddard – jurist
- Catherine Healy – sex workers' rights activist
- Annette King – politician
- Areta Koopu – social worker and Māori activist
- Hilary Lapsley – author, psychologist, social scientist
- Jenny Shipley – politician
- Cheryll Sotheran – museum administrator
- Marilyn Waring – feminist, politician, and academic
- Shirley Warren – community leader
- Nan Owen – museum manager
