= 2025 New Zealand local referendums on Māori wards and constituencies =

- 11 October 2025

Referendums were held in 37 local councils and 5 regional councils

I vote to keep/remove the Māori ward/constituency
Choice	Councils	Vote	%
Keep	18	542,134	50.25
Remove	24	467,923	43.37
Informal	306		0.02
Blank	68,586		6.36
Turnout	1,078,949		73.42
Registered	1,469,552		

The 2025 New Zealand local referendums on Māori wards and constituencies were referendums held from 9 September until 11 October 2025, on the question of whether to have dedicated Māori wards and constituencies on local councils in New Zealand. The referendums occurred alongside that year's nation-wide local elections. The referendums were held for 37 local councils and 5 regional councils, in total 42 councils.

The referendums were slated to occur following the passing of legislation requiring them, a reversal by the incumbent National government of a change made by the previous Labour government.

The major left-of-centre political parties (Labour, Greens, and Te Pāti Māori) all endorsed the pro-ward position whilst ACT endorsed the anti-wards position. The other two government parties (National and NZ First) did not endorse either side. Most incumbent mayors endorsed the pro-ward position.

The final results of the referendums were that 18 councils voted to keep Māori wards and 24 councils voted to remove them, though across the country there were almost 75,000 more keep votes.

== Key dates ==
Key dates relating to the local referendums are as follows:

early April	Electoral Commission sent out enrolment update packs.
10 July	Enrolment closes for switching to the Māori or general roll.
1 August	Enrolment closes for the printed electoral roll.
9 September	Postal voting opens.
10 October	Last day to enrol to vote.
11 October	Polling day — The voting documents must be at the council before voting closes at midday/12:00pm.
11 October	Preliminary results to be released as soon as readily available afterwards.

== Background ==
The referendums were spurred by the ruling National-led coalition government's passing of the Local Government (Electoral Legislation and Māori Wards and Māori Constituencies) Amendment Act 2024, reinstating the requirement that councils must hold referendums before establishing Māori wards that the previous Labour government had removed. Councils that had introduced Māori wards without holding a referendum were required to hold a poll at the 2025 elections if they wished to keep them.

Only two of the 45 councils with current or proposed Māori wards voted against holding a poll to determine their future. Several councils said they wanted to look into legal advice with regards to ignoring the government's requirement to hold polls. Tauranga City Council is not holding a referendum because they already held local elections recently in 2024. The cost of the referendums was projected to be over $2 million.

Te Rūnanga o Ngāti Whātua appealed the decision of the Kaipara District Council to abolish its Māori wards rather than hold a referendum, losing in the High Court in December 2024. Kaipara District Council and Upper Hutt City Council were the only two councils to abolish existing or planned Māori wards.

The referendums followed a period of increased pro-Māori activism (including Hīkoi mō te Tiriti), spurred on by perceived anti-Māori policies by central government.

== Public opinion ==
Previously held referendums on the issue have generally resulted against Māori wards. In the Far North, for example, residents voted 2-to-1 against them in a 2015 poll held for that district's representation review for the 2016 and 2019 elections.

Whanganui District Council chief executive David Langford said that in submissions to the council on the topic, 53% had been in support of Māori Wards.

In Hawke's Bay, Hastings District Council saw 76% support for Māori Wards amongst submissions made to the council on the topic in 2021; Napier City Council saw 60% of 2300 submissions in support in August 2024.

== Debate ==
=== Arguments in support of Māori wards ===
==== Social justice and representation ====
Bridget Bell, a Māori ward councillor in the Manawatū District, said that an "immense" amount of effort had been made by iwi to secure their voice on council, and that the wards were crucial to ensuring they were heard and that equity was fought for. As an example, she claimed that Marae in the district now received a similar level of support as rural villages, unlike previously.

Kassie Hartendorp, in an op-ed for E-Tangata, said that Māori wards were about "equity". She said that getting rid of them would "reverse" progress on Māori representation at the local level, pointing to a report by the Human Rights Commission that Māori were underrepresented on councils; as an example, only 5% of successful candidates in 2007 were Māori, despite comprising 15% of the population. She pointed to colonisation as the root course of this discrepancy. She said that through her work at ActionStation with community members, she had heard of the positive contributions and relationships that had formed between council and iwi groups as a result of the increased Māori representation brought about by the introduction of Māori wards. She called out racism as a major driving factor of the anti-Māori ward side. She said that in a claim that she and ActionStation brought before the Waitangi Tribunal related to the Local Government (Māori Wards) Amendment Act, that the tribunal found that the law change was a direct breach of the Treaty of Waitangi.

Pere Paniora, a Māori ward councillor in the Kaipara District (whose council voted to abolish their Māori ward), said that "undoubtedly" council will lose their connection to the Māori community. She went on to say, "I've spoken to many rangatahi (Note: Māori for "young people") who are proud to have a face and a council that represents them, that looks like them, that comes from the same background as them."

==== Cost savings ====
Whakatāne Māori ward councillor Toni Boynton argued that the existence of the district's Māori ward has helped save the council hundreds in thousands of dollars in legal costs; local iwi had repeatedly taken the council to court over decisions they felt had been made without consulting them with regards to issues that affect Māori. Since the introduction of the ward there has been no litigation.

=== Arguments against Māori wards ===
==== Democracy and equal rights ====
In a press release, David Seymour (leader of ACT New Zealand) called Māori wards "undemocratic". He railed against co-governance, saying it placed group identity over individual dignity. He said that abolishing Māori wards would restore democracy to local communities.

The right-wing news website Centrist released an op-ed explaining some arguments against Māori wards. They said that separate representation for Māori would disrupt unity, and cause tension and resentment in communities. The op-ed said that Māori already have the same opportunities as other New Zealanders, and thus there is no need to have Māori wards since Māori should be able to be elected on their own merits as individuals. The op-ed said that proponents of Māori wards were advocating for equity of outcomes rather than equality of opportunity. Kaipara mayor Craig Jepson was quoted as saying that pro-Māori ward arguments feed into a "false narrative" that was "condescending" to Māori. The op-ed also alleged that the mainstream media was biased against anti-Māori ward proponents, saying they would focus on framing them as racist rather than engaging with the issue.

== Campaign ==
=== Pro-Māori wards ===
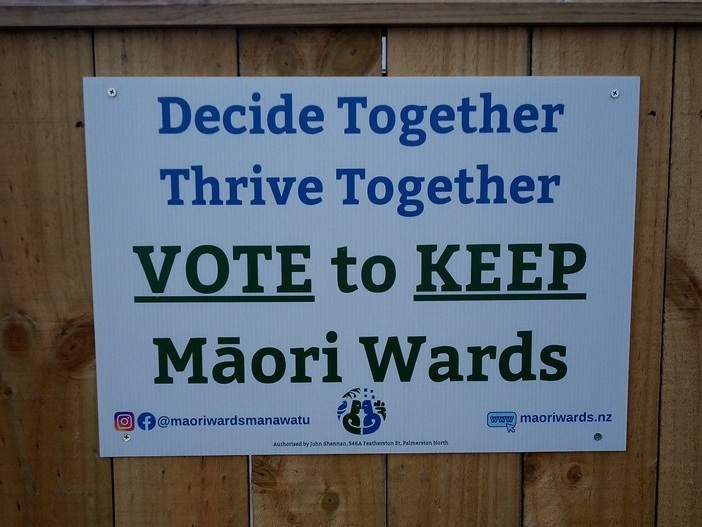
Election placard for "Keep Māori Wards" campaign in Palmerston North.

Labour, the Greens, and Te Pāti Māori would all campaign in support of Māori wards.

In April, Māori ward councillors from across the country met in Taupō as part of the annual meeting of Local Government New Zealand's subcommittee for Māori elected members, Te Maruata. Many were up for re-election, and faced having to campaign both for themselves and for the continued existence of Māori wards.

A group called Stronger Together Keep Māori Wards formed in Palmerston North, organised by Unions Manawatū. A group called For Wards Hawke's Bay formed to support the pro-ward position at the referendums in Hawke's Bay.

In August, the Christian social justice organisation "Common Grace Aotearoa" announce it would organise workshops in 100 churches across 42 districts to promote support for Māori wards, with a focus on Pākehā audiences. Several Christian leaders including retired Anglican Archbishop Sir David Moxon, Methodist Church President Te Aroha Rountree, Catholic Church Bishop Peter Cullinae, Anglican Taranaki Cathedral Dean Jay Ruka and New Zealand Baptist Missionary Society national director Alan Jamieson have expressed support for retaining Māori wards.

=== Anti-Māori wards ===
ACT New Zealand for the first time would put forward candidates in local elections; candidates from the group would campaign against Māori wards.

==== Hobson's Pledge billboard controversies ====
The lobby group Hobson's Pledge released a series of advertisements featuring a stock photo of a Māori woman with a moko kauae and the message "My mana doesn't need a mandate – Vote no to Māori wards". The individual woman pictured did not consent to her image being used and was distraught that her image was being used to promote a view she was "staunchly" opposed to. The photo was released on iStock and Shutterstock and labelled "editorial use only"; Hobson's Pledge said that they had followed all legal requirements for their use of the photo. The group took down the billboards.

In late September 2025, media company Stuff removed a Hobson's Pledge advertisement opposing Māori wards from its websites after receiving feedback on 20 September that the ad was linking to an external website that did not meet the company's terms and conditions. Meanwhile, media company New Zealand Media and Entertainment (NZME) maintained the same advertisement on its websites, stating that it met their criteria for advocacy advertising. In response, Hobson's Pledge's leader Don Brash accused Stuff of cowering to bullying and intimidation while praising NZ for upholding lawful advocacy in a "free press."

=== Endorsements ===
Organisations and community groups
For (Keep)	Against (Repeal)
For Wards Hawke's Bay; Ngāti Kahungunu Iwi Inc.; Stronger Together Keep Māori Wards	Hobson's Pledge

Incumbent mayors
For (Keep)	Against (Repeal)
Toby Adams (Hauraki); Anita Baker (Porirua); Campbell Barry (Lower Hutt); Max Baxter (Ōtorohanga); Gary Caffell (Masterton); Jacqui Church (Waikato); Martin Connelly (South Wairarapa); Tracey Collis (Tararua); James Denyer (Western Bay of Plenty); Sandra Hazlehurst (Hastings); Janet Holborow (Kāpiti Coast); Tim King (Tasman); Weston Kirton (Ruapehu); Craig Little (Wairoa); Phil Nixon (South Taranaki); Susan O'Regan (Waipā); Grant Smith (Palmerston North); Nadine Taylor (Marlborough); Moko Tepania (Far North); David Trewavas (Taupō); Alex Walker (Central Hawke's Bay); Bernie Wanden (Horowhenua); Andy Watson (Rangitikei); Tory Whanau (Wellington); Kirsten Wise (Napier)	Craig Jepson (Kaipara); John Robertson (Waitomo)

Political parties
For (Keep)	Against (Repeal)
New Zealand Labour Party; Green Party of Aotearoa New Zealand; Te Pāti Māori	ACT New Zealand

== Question ==
Voters had the choice of ticking either the box that says "I vote to keep the Māori ward/constituency" or the box that says "I vote to remove the Māori ward/constituency".

== Issues ==
In mid-September 2025, Radio New Zealand reported that the candidate profiles for Māori ward candidates in the Ōpōtiki, Whanganui, South Wairarapa and Manawatū districts had been accidentally excluded from voting packs due to printing errors. Electoral officer Warwick Lamp confirmed that Māori ward electors would be sent an individual letter containing candidate profiles. In response, the Green Party's Democracy and Electoral Reform spokesperson and Member of Parliament Celia Wade-Brown called for an extension of the voting period in Māori wards. In addition, Te Pāti Māori called on the Whanganui District Council to provide Māori ward voters with correct candidate information and a full independent investigation.

== Results ==
=== By council ===
Council	Margin	%	Keep	%	Remove	%	Inf.	%	Blank	%	Turnout	Ref.
Territorial authorities
Far North DC	2,727	11.11	13,346	54.35	10,619	43.24	17	0.07	574	2.34	24,556	
Whangarei DC	-3,013	-9.88	13,206	43.31	16,219	53.19	16	0.05	1,049	3.44	30,490	
Hauraki DC	-899	-14.69	2,392	39.08	3,291	53.77	8	0.13	429	7.01	6,120	
Thames-Coromandel DC	-2,122	-16.37	4,873	37.59	6,995	53.96	11	0.08	1,084	8.36	12,963	
Matamata-Piako DC	-2,729	-23.59	3,815	32.97	6,544	56.56	3	0.03	1,208	10.44	11,570	
Waikato DC	-707	-3.64	9,358	48.18	10,065	51.82					~19,423	
Hamilton CC	2,870	7.54	19,190	50.42	16,320	42.88	18	0.05	2,535	6.66	38,063	
Waipa DC	-2,340	-13.44	6,950	39.92	9,290	53.36	1	0.01	1,170	6.72	17,411	
Ōtorohanga DC	-121	-3.82	1,410	44.51	1,531	48.33	0	0.00	227	7.17	3,168	
Western Bay of Plenty DC	-2,570	-16.80	5,892	38.51	8,462	55.31	0	0.00	944	6.17	15,298	
Whakatane DC	2,607	20.32	7,484	58.35	4,877	38.03	3	0.02	460	3.59	12,824	
Kawerau DC	847	36.12	1,557	66.40	710	30.28	3	0.13	75	3.20	2,345	
Rotorua Lakes DC	2,856	13.11	11,363	52.14	8,507	39.03	3	0.01	1,922	8.82	21,795	
Taupo DC	-2,989	-18.84	6,058	38.18	9,047	57.02	2	0.01	759	4.78	15,866	
Gisborne DC	4,200	25.65	9,904	60.48	5,704	34.83	6	0.04	763	4.66	16,377	
Hastings DC	-1,111	-4.15	12,216	45.65	13,327	49.80	5	0.02	1,211	4.53	26,759	
Napier CC	-2,812	-13.19	8,844	41.47	11,656	54.66	3	0.01	822	3.85	21,325	
Central Hawke's Bay DC	-1,131	-18.44	2,371	38.65	3,502	57.09	1	0.02	260	4.24	6,134	
Tararua DC	-527	-7.40	3,049	42.84	3,576	50.24	0	0.00	493	6.93	7,118	
Rangitikei DC	-135	-2.47	2,516	46.16	2,651	48.63	1	0.02	283	5.19	5,451	
Ruapehu DC	116	2.70	2,098	48.77	1,982	46.07	2	0.05	220	5.11	4,302	
Whanganui DC	830	4.88	8,292	48.71	7,462	43.83	2	0.01	1,268	7.45	17,024	
Manawatu DC	-1,266	-12.8	4,114	41.61	5,380	54.41	2	0.02	391	3.95	9,887	
Palmerston North CC	2,655	10.59	13,373	53.36	10,718	42.77	13	0.05	956	3.81	25,060	
New Plymouth DC	-2,958	-10.34	12,046	42.08	15,004	52.42	11	0.04	1,564	5.46	28,625	
Stratford DC	-850	-23.07	1,320	35.83	2,170	58.9	2	0.05	192	5.21	3,684	
South Taranaki DC	-683	-8.09	3,687	43.70	4,370	51.79	3	0.04	378	4.48	8,438	
Horowhenua DC	-188	-1.54	5,747	47.06	5,935	48.6	2	0.02	529	4.33	12,213	
Kapiti Coast DC	2,838	13.85	10,790	52.68	7,952	38.83	12	0.06	1,727	8.43	20,481	
Porirua CC	6,535	37.09	11,775	66.82	5,240	29.73	3	0.02	605	3.43	17,623	
Hutt CC	8,288	25.09	19,976	60.47	11,688	35.38	4	0.01	1,369	4.14	33,037	
Wellington CC	28,312	34.71	52,677	64.58	24,365	29.87	18	0.02	4,514	5.53	81,574	
Masterton DC	511	5.34	4,810	50.29	4,299	44.95	2	0.02	453	4.74	9,564	
South Wairarapa DC	620	11.08	2,911	52.02	2,291	40.94	0	0.00	394	7.04	5,596	
Nelson CC	2,578	13.72	10,168	54.12	7,590	40.40	2	0.01	1,029	5.48	18,789	
Tasman DC	-2,313	-11.46	8,216	40.71	10,529	52.17	4	0.02	1,434	7.10	20,183	
Marlborough DC	-2,325	-15.16	5,786	37.74	8,111	52.90	1	0.01	1,435	9.36	15,333	
Regional councils
Northland RC	-661	-1.01	30,878	47.01	31,539	48.02	38	0.06	3,226	4.91	65,681	
Hawke's Bay RC	-3,746	-6.54	24,447	42.66	28,193	49.20	5	0.01	4,662	8.14	57,307	
Horizons RC	776	0.96	36,864	45.53	36,088	44.57	19	0.02	7,996	9.88	80,967	
Taranaki RC	-4,374	-10.76	16,721	41.13	21,095	51.89	16	0.04	2,821	6.94	40,653	
Greater Wellington RC	46,615	24.81	109,644	58.36	63,029	33.55	44	0.02	15,155	8.07	187,872	
Totals	74,211	6.88	542,134	50.25	467,923	43.37	306	0.02	68,586	6.36	1,078,949	

=== By territorial authority ward ===
Results by ward, where available.

Ward	Margin	%	Keep	%	Remove	%	Inf.	%	Blank	%	Turnout	Ref.
Thames Coromandel District Council
Thames general	-84	-2.25	1,658	44.34	1,742	46.59	1	0.03	338	9.04	3,739	
Mercury Bay general	-1,315	-33.28	1,150	29.11	2,465	62.39	2	0.05	334	8.45	3,951	
South East general	-1,292	-38.35	885	26.27	2,177	64.62	4	0.12	303	8.99	3,369	
Coromandel Colville general	-42	-3.46	536	44.19	578	47.65	3	0.25	96	7.91	1,213	
Te Tara o Te Ika Māori	611	88.42	644	93.20	33	4.78	1	0.14	13	1.88	691	
Matamata-Piako District Council
Morrinsville general	-1,092	-27.91	1,224	31.28	2,316	59.19	2	0.05	371	9.48	3,913	
Te Aroha general	-728	-27.05	838	31.14	1,566	58.19	0	0.00	287	10.67	2,691	
Matamata general	-1,367	-30.76	1,266	28.48	2,633	59.24	1	0.02	545	12.26	4,445	
Te Toa Horopu a Matamata-Piako Māori	458	87.90	487	93.47	29	5.57	0	0.00	5	0.96	521	
Waipā District Council
Pirongia and Kakepuku general	-887	-28.28	1,033	32.94	1,920	61.22	0	0.00	183	5.84	3,136	
Cambridge general	-1,297	-17.48	2,738	36.91	4,035	54.39	0	0.00	646	8.71	7,419	
Maungatautari general	-489	-30.52	527	32.90	1,016	63.42	0	0.00	59	3.68	1,602	
Te Awamutu and Kihikihi general	-587	-13.79	1,699	39.92	2,286	53.71	1	0.02	270	6.34	4,256	
Waipā Māori	920	92.18	953	95.49	33	3.31	0	0.00	12	1.20	998	
Ōtorohanga District Council
Kawhia-Tihiroa general	-132	-16.24	307	37.76	439	54.00	0	0.00	67	8.24	813	
Waipā general	-157	-37.56	115	27.51	272	65.07	0	0.00	31	7.42	418	
Kio Kio-Korakonui general	-132	-35.58	106	28.57	238	64.15	0	0.00	27	7.28	371	
Ōtorohanga general	-71	-9.19	326	42.17	397	51.36	0	0.00	50	6.47	773	
Wharepuhunga general	-122	-52.13	43	18.38	165	70.51	0	0.00	26	11.11	234	
Rangiatea Māori	493	88.19	513	91.77	20	3.58	0	0.00	26	4.65	559	
Taupō District Council
Mangakino-Pouakani general	-172	-25.30	233	34.26	405	59.56	0	0.00	42	6.18	680	
Taupō general	-3,804	-35.13	3,251	30.03	7,055	65.16	2	0.02	519	4.79	10,827	
Turangi-Tongariro general	-212	-12.79	681	41.07	893	53.86	0	0.00	84	5.07	1,658	
Taupō East Rural general	-448	-51.38	190	21.79	638	73.17	0	0.00	44	5.05	872	
Te Papamarearea Māori	1,647	90.05	1,703	93.11	56	3.06	0	0.00	70	3.83	1,829	
Rotorua Lakes Council
Rural general	-791	-38.99	557	27.45	1,348	66.44	0	0.00	124	6.11	2,029	
Te Ipu Wai Auraki general	-1,140	-7.74	5,956	40.43	7,096	48.17	1	0.01	1,678	11.39	14,731	
Te Ipu Wai Taketake Māori	4,787	95.08	4,850	96.33	63	1.25	2	0.04	120	2.38	5,035	
Western Bay of Plenty District Council
Katikati-Waihi Beach general	-1,622	-35.01	1,364	29.44	2,986	64.45	0	0.00	283	6.11	4,633	
Maketu-Te Puke general	-466	-12.03	1,541	39.79	2,007	51.82	0	0.00	325	8.39	3,873	
Kaimai general	-1,780	-33.07	1,649	30.63	3,429	63.70	0	0.00	305	5.67	5,383	
Waka Kai Uru Māori	1,298	92.12	1,338	94.96	40	2.84	0	0.00	31	2.20	1,409	
Whakatāne District Council
Whakatāne-Ōhope general	-262	-4.24	2,798	45.31	3,060	49.55	1	0.02	316	5.12	6,175	
Te Urewera general	31	3.15	491	49.95	460	46.80	0	0.00	32	3.26	983	
Rangitāiki general	-295	-12.18	1,016	41.95	1,311	54.13	0	0.00	95	3.92	2,422	
Rangitāiki Māori	1,052	97.59	1,063	98.61	11	1.02	1	0.09	3	0.28	1,078	
Kāpu-te-rangi Māori	972	94.37	996	96.70	24	2.33	1	0.10	9	0.87	1,030	
Toi ki Uta Māori	1,109	97.62	1,120	98.59	11	0.97	0	0.00	5	0.44	1,136	
Hastings District Council
Mohaka general	-905	-47.65	480	25.28	1,385	72.93	0	0.00	34	1.79	1,899	
Heretaunga general	-1,006	-26.68	1,330	35.27	2,336	61.95	0	0.00	105	2.78	3,771	
Hastings-Havelock North general	-2,224	-15.69	5,522	38.95	7,746	54.64	5	0.04	904	6.38	14,177	
Flaxmere general	437	34.71	828	65.77	391	31.06	0	0.00	40	3.18	1,259	
Kahuranaki general	-704	-32.7	690	32.05	1,394	64.75	0	0.00	69	3.20	2,153	
Takitimu Maori	3,291	94.03	3,366	96.17	75	2.14	0	0.00	59	1.69	3,500	
Napier City Council
Ahuriri general	-1,673	-22.16	2,794	37.01	4,467	59.17	1	0.01	287	3.80	7,549	
Napier Central general	-581	-11.31	2,172	42.31	2,753	53.62	2	0.04	207	4.03	5,134	
Taradale general	-1,980	-27.89	2,404	33.85	4,384	61.74	0	0.00	313	4.41	7,101	
Te Whanga Māori	1,422	92.28	1,474	95.65	52	3.37	0	0.00	15	0.97	1,541	
Central Hawke's Bay District Council
Aramoana-Ruahine general	-942	-33.22	902	31.82	1,844	65.04	1	0.04	88	3.10	2,835	
Ruataniwha general	-654	-23.48	982	35.26	1,636	58.74	0	0.00	167	6.00	2,785	
Rautahi Māori	465	90.47	487	94.75	22	4.28	0	0.00	5	0.97	514	
Stratford District Council
Stratford Rural general	-558	-42.66	347	26.53	905	69.19	0	0	56	4.28	1,308	
Stratford Urban general	-401	-17.86	853	38	1254	55.86	2	0.09	136	6.06	2,245	
Stratford Māori	109	83.2	120	91.6	11	8.4	0	0	0	0	131	
Rangitīkei District Council
Northern general	-104	-10.40	422	42.20	526	52.60	0	0.00	52	5.20	1,000	
Central general	-486	-17.79	1,040	38.07	1,526	55.86	0	0.00	166	6.08	2,732	
Southern general	-234	-24.40	332	34.62	566	59.02	0	0.00	61	6.36	959	
Tiikeitia ki Uta (Inland) Māori	396	90.82	415	95.18	19	4.36	0	0.00	2	0.46	436	
Tiikeitia ki Tai (Coastal) Māori	293	90.43	307	94.75	14	4.32	1	0.31	2	0.62	324	
Ruapehu District Council
Ruapehu general	-670	-19.44	1,293	37.51	1,963	56.95	2	0.06	189	5.48	3,447	
Ruapehu Māori	786	91.71	805	93.93	19	2.22	2	0.23	31	3.62	857	
Whanganui District Council
Whanganui general	-1,175	-7.87	6,258	41.90	7,433	49.77	2	0.01	1,241	8.31	14,934	
Whanganui Māori	2,005	95.93	2,034	97.32	29	1.39	0	0.00	27	1.29	2,090	
Manawatū District Council
Manawatū Rural general	-1,397	-31.21	1,445	32.28	2,842	63.49	1	0.02	188	4.20	4,476	
Feilding general	-550	-11.71	1,976	42.09	2,526	53.80	1	0.02	192	4.09	4,695	
Nga Tapuae o Matangi Māori	681	95.11	693	96.79	12	1.68	0	0.00	11	1.54	716	
Tararua District Council
North Tararua general	-753	-20.26	1,335	35.94	2,088	56.20	0	0.00	292	7.86	3,715	
South Tararua general	-345	-12.45	1,115	40.22	1,460	52.67	0	0.00	197	7.11	2,772	
Tamaki nui-a-Rua Māori	571	90.49	599	94.93	28	4.44	0	0.00	4	0.63	631	
Horowhenua District Council
Kere Kere general	-242	-12.84	781	41.43	1,023	54.27	0	0.00	81	4.30	1,885	
Miranui general	-34	-3.87	408	46.47	442	50.34	0	0.00	28	3.19	878	
Levin general	-368	-7.59	2,107	43.48	2,475	51.07	2	0.04	262	5.41	4,846	
Waiopehu general	-762	-23.00	1,202	36.28	1,964	59.28	0	0.00	147	4.44	3,313	
Horowhenua Māori	1,218	94.35	1,249	96.75	31	2.40	0	0.00	11	0.85	1,291	
Porirua City Council
Pauatahanui general	1,059	13.32	4,371	54.97	3,312	41.65	2	0.03	267	3.36	7,952	
Onepoto general	3,601	46.82	5,487	71.35	1,886	24.53	1	0.01	316	4.11	7,690	
Parirua Māori	1,875	94.65	1,917	96.77	42	2.12	0	0.00	22	1.11	1,981	
Hutt City Council
Western general	501	11.47	2,349	53.77	1,848	42.30	0	0.00	172	3.94	4,369	
Harbour general	1,279	24.51	3,136	60.10	1,857	35.59	0	0.00	225	4.31	5,218	
Northern general	1,748	24.23	4,312	59.78	2,564	35.55	1	0.01	336	4.66	7,213	
Central general	896	10.57	4,502	53.10	3,606	42.53	2	0.02	368	4.34	8,478	
Wainuiomata general	1,204	23.54	2,975	58.16	1,771	34.62	1	0.02	368	7.19	5,115	
Mana Kairangi ki Tai Māori	2,660	89.05	2,702	90.46	42	1.41	0	0.00	243	8.14	2,987	
Wellington City Council
Takapu/Northern general	2,267	13.78	8,702	52.87	6,435	39.09	4	0.02	1,319	8.01	16,460	
Wharangi/Onslow-Western general	5,908	29.63	12,417	62.27	6,509	32.64	5	0.03	1,010	5.06	19,941	
Pukehinau/Lambton general	6,193	43.82	9,865	69.80	3,672	25.98	2	0.01	595	4.21	14,134	
Motukairangi/Eastern general	4,575	30.62	9,279	62.10	4,704	31.48	6	0.04	952	6.37	14,941	
Paekawakawa/Southern general	6,763	50.98	9,707	73.18	2,944	22.20	1	0.01	612	4.61	13,264	
Te Whanganui-a-Tara Māori	2,606	91.96	2,707	95.52	101	3.56	0	0.00	26	0.92	2,834	
Masterton District Council
Masterton general	-178	-2.02	4,106	46.46	4,284	48.48	2	0.02	445	5.04	8,837	
Masterton Māori	689	94.78	704	96.84	15	2.06	0	0.00	8	1.10	727	
South Wairarapa District Council
Greytown general	110	5.37	991	48.39	881	43.02	0	0.00	176	8.59	2,048	
Featherston general	319	23.45	783	57.57	464	34.12	0	0.00	113	8.31	1,360	
Martinborough general	18	0.91	949	47.93	931	47.02	0	0.00	100	5.05	1,980	
Te Karu o Te Ika a Māui Māori	173	83.17	188	90.38	15	7.21	0	0.00	5	2.40	208	
Nelson City Council
Central general	2,198	23.73	5,498	59.34	3,300	35.61	0	0.00	468	5.05	9,266	
Stoke-Tahunanui general	-41	-0.45	4,227	46.68	4,268	47.13	2	0.02	558	6.16	9,055	
Whakatu Māori	421	89.96	443	94.66	22	4.70	0	0.00	3	0.64	468	
Marlborough District Council
Marlborough Sounds general	-671	-22.88	1,031	35.15	1,702	58.03	0	0.00	200	6.82	2,933	
Wairau-Awatere general	-909	-26.28	1,170	33.82	2,079	60.10	0	0.00	210	6.07	3,459	
Blenheim general	-1,163	-13.81	3,123	37.06	4,286	50.87	1	0.01	1,016	12.06	8,426	
Marlborough Māori	418	81.17	462	89.71	44	8.54	0	0.00	9	1.75	515	
