= Local Government (Electoral Legislation and Māori Wards and Māori Constituencies) Amendment Act 2024 =

Act of Parliament in New Zealand

New Zealand Parliament
- Royal assent: 30 July 2024

Legislative history
- Introduced by: Simeon Brown
- First reading: 23 May 2024
- Second reading: 23 July 2024
- Third reading: 30 July 2024

Related legislation
- Local Electoral Act 2001, Local Government Electoral Legislation Act 2023, Local Electoral Regulations 2001
- Status: Current legislation

The Local Government (Electoral Legislation and Māori Wards and Māori Constituencies) Amendment Act 2024 is a New Zealand Act of Parliament which reinstates the poll requirements for Māori wards and constituencies. It requires local and regional councils that have established Māori wards and constituencies since 2020 without holding a referendum to hold one at the 2025 New Zealand local elections. The bill was one of the key commitments of the Sixth National Government that was formed following the 2023 New Zealand general election. It passed its third reading and became law on 30 July 2024.

== Background ==
In 2001, the Local Electoral Act 2001 was passed, allowing local or regional councils to establish Māori wards and constituencies to encourage Māori participation at the local government level. The law allowed local residents to petition for a binding referendum (or poll) to be held to challenge local and regional authorities' decisions to introduce Māori wards and constituencies. Under the law, a petition attracting five percent of local ratepayers was sufficient to trigger a poll on Māori wards. Since the law came into effect in 2002, 24 local councils had attempted to introduce Māori wards. However, only the Bay of Plenty Regional Council, Waikato Regional Council and Wairoa District Council has introduced and retained them by February 2021. Efforts to introduce Māori wards by other councils including Palmerston North City Council, Kaikōura District Council, Whakatāne District Council, Manawatu District Council, and Western Bay of Plenty District Council were defeated during local polls in 2018.

In May 2016, former Mayor of New Plymouth Andrew Judd submitted a petition calling for the poll requirement for Māori wards to be eliminated through a law change. This was considered by Parliament's justice select committee between 2016 and 2019 but faltered due to disagreement between Labour and National Members of Parliament. In December 2020, advocacy group ActionStation and Māori ward campaigners Toni Boynton and Danae Lee collected 10,000 signatures calling for Parliament to eliminate the poll requirement for Māori wards and constituencies.

In late February 2021, the Sixth Labour Government passed the Local Electoral (Māori Wards and Māori Constituencies) Amendment Act 2021, which eliminated the poll provision for establishing Māori wards and constituencies. While the bill was supported by the Labour, Green parties and Te Pāti Māori, it was opposed by the opposition National and ACT parties which vowed to repeal the legislation if elected during the 2023 New Zealand general election. As a result, during the 2022 New Zealand local elections, six of the eleven regional councils (54.5%) established Māori constituencies and 29 of the 67 territorial authorities (43.3%) established Māori wards.

In late November 2023, the newly-formed Sixth National Government and its coalition partners ACT and New Zealand First pledged to "restore the right of local referendum on the establishment or ongoing use of Māori wards."

== Key provisions ==
The Local Government (Electoral Legislation and Māori Wards and Māori Constituencies) Amendment Act 2024 is an omnibus bill that amends the Local Electoral Act 2001, the Local Government Electoral Legislation Act 2023 and Local Electoral Regulations 2001. The bill reinstates the poll policy settings for Māori wards and constituencies that were established under the Local Electoral Act 2001. These include the five percent electorate threshold for petitioning local and regional councils, the eligibility of voters (any person on the electoral roll for that council), the simple majority requirement needed to bind a council to the outcome and the two term timeframe for binding polls. The 2024 Act also eliminated the requirement for councils that had not established Māori wards and constituencies to consider the decision every six years.

The 2024 Act also requires local and regional councils that had established Māori wards and constituencies after 2020 without a poll to hold one during the 2025 New Zealand local elections. This will come into effect at the 2028 local elections. Councils, which had either established Māori wards and constituencies during the 2022 local elections or have resolved to establish them for the 2025 local elections, can vote to dissolve them without having a poll.

The 2024 Act also extends the delivery period for voting papers from six to 14 days, and the voting period for local elections from 22.5 days to 32.5 days. While the Local Government Act 2001 had set a postal ballot delivery date of six days and a voting period of 22.5 days, a reduction in New Zealand Post's staffing and postal infrastructure due to declining letter volumes and increased courier demand had led to delays in people receiving their postal ballot papers. Since 1995, all local councils had opted for postal voting over polling booths.

== Legislative history ==
=== Introduction ===
In early April 2024, the Local Government Minister Simeon Brown announced that local and regional councils which introduced Māori wards without polling residents would have to hold referendums during the 2025 local elections or dissolve the wards they had established prior to the 2025 local elections. Brown also announced that the government would introduce legislation restoring the right to referendums on Māori wards by the end of July 2024. The Wairoa District, Waikato Region and Bay of Plenty Regional Councils are unaffected by the Government declaration since they introduced Māori wards before the removal of poll requirements. The Ōpōtiki District's Māori wards are not affected by the ruling since they held a poll during the 2022 New Zealand local elections that found majority support for wards. The Tauranga City Council, which had been under the management of commissioners since 2020, held elections in July 2024. Tauranga has the option of reversing its decision to establish Māori wards or holding a poll during the 2024–2028 term, with the outcome taking effect after the 2028 local elections. The Stratford District Council, which had introduced a Māori ward during the 2022 local body elections, was also affected by the new proposed law since it had not conducted a referendum among residents.

=== First reading ===
The Bill passed its first reading on 23 May 2024 by a margin of 68 to 55 votes. While the National Party and its ACT and New Zealand First coalition partners supported the Bill, it was opposed by the Labour, Green parties, and Te Pāti Māori. The bill's sponsor Brown argued that the Government was not removing the right to establish Māori wards but was restoring the right for local communities to decide. Similar sentiments were echoed by ACT MP Cameron Luxton and NZ First MP Andy Foster. By contrast, opposition MPs including Labour MP Kieran McAnulty, Green MP Hūhana Lyndon and Te Pāti Māori MP Mariameno Kapa-Kingi accused the Government of promoting racism against Māori, undermining local governments, creating barriers to Māori participation in local government and violating the Treaty of Waitangi's principle of partnership.

=== Select committee stage ===
Following its first reading, the Bill was referred to the Justice select committee with the deadline for submissions closing at 11:59 pm on 29 May 2024. The committee received and considered submissions from 10,614 interested groups and individuals. It also heard 172 oral submissions in Wellington and via video conference. The committee also received and considered 13,403 email submissions from the New Zealand Taxpayers' Union.

The Justice select committee upheld most of the provisions of the Bill including reinstating the poll provisions of the Local Government Act 2001 and provisions for reverting to the pre-2020 arrangement for local councils. The committee acknowledged the Waitangi Tribunal's critical report of the Government's Māori wards legislation and the bill's Departmental Disclosure Statement that the legislation might conflict with the International Covenant on Civil and Political Rights. The committee also developed a transitional options for councils to either disestablish their Māori wards or to hold binding polls on them during the 2025 local body elections. The select committee also considered the Labour and Green parties' differing views that the legislation hurt efforts to increase Māori representation at the local government level, interfered with local government principles and objectives and clashed with the Crown's Treaty of Waitangi obligations.

=== Second reading ===
On 23 July, the Bill passed its second reading. Parliament voted by a margin of 68 to 55 votes to recommend the Justice select committee's recommendations and to read the bill a second time. National MPs Paulo Garcia and Tom Rutherford argued that the Bill would allow local communities to vote on Māori wards while fellow National MP Cameron Brewer argued that the election of Māori to Parliament and local government seats negated the need for Māori seats and wards. By contrast, Labour MPs Shanan Halbert and Duncan Webb criticised the Government for taking race relations backward and damaging Māori-Crown relations.

=== Third reading ===
On 30 July, the Bill passed its third reading by a margin of 68 to 55 votes. While National, ACT and NZ First supported the bill as part of their coalition agreements, it was opposed by the Labour, Green parties, and Te Pāti Māori parties. During the third reading, Simeon Brown said that the Government was supporting local democracy by giving local communities the right to decide whether to establish Māori wards in their communities. By contrast, Labour leader Chris Hipkins accused the Government of discriminating against Māori and promoting division. Similarly, Te Pāti Māori MP Kapa-Kingi described the law change as an attack on the Treaty of Waitangi and an attempt to silence Māori.

Other speeches supporting the bill were also given by ACT MP Cameron Luxton, NZ First MP Andy Foster, and National MPs James Meager, Cameron Brewer, Paulo Garcia, and Rima Nakhle. Speeches opposing the bill were also made by Green MPs Hūhana Lyndon, Steve Abel and Labour MPs Willie Jackson, Shanan Halbert, Willow-Jean Prime and Cushla Tangaere-Manuel.

== Responses ==
=== Waitangi Tribunal inquiry ===
On 8 May 2024, Pita Tipene, chairperson for Te Rūnanga o Ngāti Hine, requested an urgent Waitangi Tribunal inquiry into the Government's decision to reinstate polls on Māori wards and constituencies in local government bodies as an attack on their efforts to uphold their Treaty of Waitangi obligations. The Tribunal held an urgent inquiry prior to the introduction of the Electoral Legislation and Māori Wards and Māori Constituencies bill on 20 May. On 17 May, the Tribunal released its report on the Government's policy to repeal amendments made to the Local Electoral Act 2001 by the Local Electoral (Māori Wards and Māori Constituencies) Amendment Act 2021. They argued that the Government's policy of repealing the 2021 legislation breached the New Zealand Crown's Treaty of Waitangi obligations, would lead to the reduction in dedicated Māori representation at the local government level, expose Māori communities to racism and damage Māori-Crown relations. The Tribunal found that the Crown had breached the Treaty principle of partnership by prioritising coalition agreement commitments and failing to consult with Māori.

=== Local government responses ===
On 22 May 2024, 54 mayors and regional council chairpersons including Local Government New Zealand (LGNZ) President and Mayor of Selwyn Sam Broughton, Mayor of Palmerston North Grant Smith, Mayor of Central Otago Tim Cadogan, Mayor of Wellington Tory Whanau and Mayor of Dunedin Jules Radich issued a joint letter criticising the Government's proposed law change requiring local councils to hold referendums on having Māori wards and constituencies, describing it as "an overreach on local decision-making." In response, Brown along with New Zealand First leader Winston Peters and ACT Party David Seymour defended the proposed legislation as a restoration of democracy and said that New Zealanders had voted for change during the 2023 New Zealand general election.

During the annual LGNZ conference held on 21 August, the Palmerston North City Council (PNCC) submitted a remit challenging the Government's referendum requirement for Māori wards. The PNCC's remit was supported by the Far North District Council. In addition, the Northland Regional Council introduced a remit calling for a 75% majority vote for any changes to the Local Election Act 2001 affecting Māori wards. According to the Otago Daily Times, 83.5% of local councils at the LGNZ conference sponsored the remit opposing the poll requirement for Māori wards and constituencies. In response, Minister Brown defended the Government's Māori ward polls requirement.

=== Civil society ===
In early June 2024, the Human Rights Commission (HRC) described the Government's proposed legislation to reinstate polls on Māori wards as discriminatory and claimed it would undermine local decision-making. The human rights watchdog said that Māori wards ensured a Māori voice on many local councils and that the Government's legislation would conflict with local councils' Treaty of Waitangi obligations and international human rights standards. The HRC also said that Māori wards were held to a higher procedural standard than general or rural wards, and that polls would heighten racism and bigotry against Māori.

== Implementation ==
Map of local and regional councils with Māori wards following the 2024 law change

Under the National-led government's 2024 law change the 45 local councils, which had established Māori wards following the 2021 law change abolishing binding referendums on Māori wards, were required to decide whether to drop their Māori wards or hold a binding referendum on them at the 2025 New Zealand local elections by 6 September 2024. If councils chose to keep their Māori wards, they would have to fund the referendums themselves. On 31 July 2024, the Department of Internal Affairs released an updated fact sheet to help local councils understand the legislative requirements, a flowchart outlining decision pathways for affected councils and an informational sheet.

=== Disestablishment ===
On 7 August 2024, the Kaipara District Council became the first local council to vote to disestablish its Māori wards under the Government's 2024 legislation. Prior to the 2022 New Zealand local elections, the Council had voted to establish its Te Moananui o Kaipara Māori ward, which was won by Councillor Pera Paniora. Kaipara councillors including Mayor Craig Jepson voted by margin of 6 to 3 in favour of disestablishing the Te Moananui o Kaipara Māori ward with one abstention. During the vote, 150 protesters demonstrated outside the Kaipara Council's Mangawhai office. Paniora will continue serving as Councillor until the end of her three-year term in October 2025. While the Kaipara council's decision was welcomed by Democracy Northland spokesperson Frank Newman, Te Runanga o Ngāti Whātua (the tribal representative body for Ngāti Whātua) trustee Deb Nathan announced that they would file legal proceedings against the council for failing to consult local Māori over its removal.

On 7 August, the Upper Hutt City Council rescinded its 2023 decision to establish at least one Māori ward for the 2025 and 2028 local elections.

On 11 September, Ngāti Whātua challenged the Kaipara District Council's decision in early August to disestablish its Māori ward. Ngāti Whātua's lawyer Mai Chen argued that the Council had breached its obligations under the Local Government Act to ensure Māori involvement in the decision-making process and that the Council's timeframe for consulting iwi and hapu was too short. In response, Kaipara District Council's lawyer Padraig McNamara argued that Māori consultation was not required under either the Local Government Act or the Local Electorate Act. McMara argued that the Council had fulfilled its obligations under both laws to Māori in decision-making at a governance level. The hearing was heard by Justice Neil Campbell of the Auckland High Court, who reserved his decision.

=== Retention subject to polls ===
On 7 August, the New Plymouth District Council voted by a majority to retain its Te Purutanga Mauri Pūmanawa Māori Ward subject to a binding poll during the 2025 local elections. Cr Murray Chong, who had opposed Māori wards, abstained during the vote and claimed that his ute had been fired upon due to his outspoken views. Mayor Neil Holdom and Māori ward councillor Te Waka McLeod condemned the shooting as unacceptable while Police confirmed they were investigating the incident. McLeod expressed hope that voters would support the retention of New Plymouth's Māori but called for a communications strategy to combat disinformation.

On 8 August, the Gisborne District Council voted by a majority to retain its Māori wards subject to a binding poll during the 2025 local elections. The sole opponent was Cr Rob Telfer, who said that " he did not want to put people in boxes."

On 13 August, the Stratford District Council voted unanimously to retain its Māori ward subject to a binding poll during the 2025 local elections.

On 25 August, the Taranaki Regional Council voted unanimously to uphold a 6 August motion to retain its Māori constituency. A binding poll will be held during the 2025 local elections. On 27 August, the Waipa District Council voted to retain their Māori ward subject to a binding poll.

On 28 August, the Hawke's Bay Regional Council and Rotorua Lakes and Taupō District Councils voted to retain their Māori wards subject to binding polls. The Hawke's Bay Regional Council attracted criticism from Minister Brown after patched gang members attended the Māori ward voting meeting despite a ban on gang insignia.

On 29 August, the Hamilton City Council, Porirua City Council, Rangitīkei, and Matamata-Piako, Whangarei District Councils voted to retain their Māori wards subject to binding polls. By 30 August, more than half of the 45 city, district and regional councils had voted to retain their Māori wards subject to binding referendums.

On 2 September, the Tararua and Western Bay of Plenty District Councils voted to reaffirm their earlier decisions to introduce Māori wards, subject to binding polls at the 2025 local elections. On 3 September, the Hauraki, Thames-Coromandel and Whanganui District Councils voted to introduce Māori wards at the 2025 local elections, subject to binding polls. That same day, the Marlborough District Council voted to retain its Māori ward, subject to a binding poll at the 2025 local elections.

On 4 September, the South Wairarapa, Horowhenua and South Taranaki District Councils voted to retain their Māori wards, subject to binding polls at the 2025 elections.

On 5 September, the Wellington City Council voted to retain its Māori ward. The Central Hawke's Bay District Council voted by a majority to reaffirm an earlier decision to introduce a Māori ward at the 2025 and 2028 local elections. Councillors Jerry Greer and Tim Aitken voted against the motion, with Aitken saying that voters should have the right to vote in a binding poll and claiming that New Zealanders were dividing themselves on race. That same day, the Napier City Council voted by a majority to reaffirm its 2021 decision to establish a Māori at the 2025 local elections subject to a binding poll.

On 6 September, the Hutt City Council also voted to retain its Māori ward subject to a binding poll and rename Petone "Pito One." By the deadline of 6 September, most of the 45 local councils except Kaipara and Upper Hutt had voted to retain their Māori wards. Other councils voting to retain their Māori wards included the Masterton, the Ōtorohanga, the Tāupo, the Kawerau and Tasman District Councils. Several local leaders including Whanganui councillor Ross Fallen, South Wairarapa councillor Rebecca Gray, South Wairarapa Deputy Mayor Melissa Sadler-Futter, Waipā Mayor Susan O'Regan and Porirua Mayor Anita Baker criticised the Government's poll requirement for Māori wards.

During the 2025 New Zealand local referendums on Māori wards and constituencies held on 11 October, 24 district and regional councils voted to disestablish their Māori wards and constituencies while 18 others vote to retain them.

=== Challenges to 2024 legislation ===
On 8 August, the Palmerston North City Council voted to retain its Te Pūao Māori Ward and also passed an amendment to seek information on the implications of avoiding a binding poll, which it described as a "race-based" decision. The Council's decision was criticised by ACT leader David Seymour and ACT local government spokesperson Cameron Luxton, saying that voters should have the right to decide whether to retain or abolish their Māori ward.

On 16 August, the Whakatāne District Council voted to retain its three Māori wards and adopted a motion by Councillor Nandor Tanczos asking the Council to explore legal options for not holding a poll on its Māori ward at the 2025 elections.

In mid-August 2024, the Ruapehu, South Taranaki and Gisborne District Councils sought an exemption from the Government's requirement to hold polls on their Māori wards since they had introduced Māori wards between October and November 2020, prior to the Labour Government's law change. On 20 August, Local Government Minister Simeon Brown declined their petition, stating that the three months notification period was insufficient for local communities to have a say in a petition.

On 6 September, the Far North District Council voted unanimously to retain its Māori ward and also passed a motion that its chief executive investigate options for not conducting a binding poll at the 2025 local elections.
