= Local Electoral (Māori Wards and Māori Constituencies) Amendment Act 2021 =

Act of Parliament in New Zealand

New Zealand Parliament
- Royal assent: 1 March 2021

Legislative history
- Introduced by: Nanaia Mahuta
- First reading: 9 February 2021
- Second reading: 23 February 2021
- Third reading: 23 February 2021

Related legislation
- Local Electoral Act 2001
- Status: In force

The Local Electoral (Māori Wards and Māori Constituencies) Amendment Act is a statute of the New Zealand Parliament that amended the Local Electoral Act 2001, eliminating the requirement for holding public referendums on the establishment of Māori wards and constituencies on local bodies. The amendment statute was supported by the Labour, Green and Māori parties but opposed by the opposition National and ACT parties. National attempted to delay the bill by mounting a twelve-hour-long filibuster challenging all of the Act's ten clauses.

In July 2024, the National-led coalition government passed the Local Government (Electoral Legislation and Māori Wards and Māori Constituencies) Amendment Act 2024, which undid the changes made by the 2021 statute, reinstating the poll provisions on the establishment or ongoing use of Māori wards. The 2021 act has technically not been repealed and remains in force, but its effects have been nullified.

== Background ==
The existing Local Electoral Act 2001 allowed local referendums (or polls) to overturn the decision of an elected local or regional council to introduce a Māori ward. Just five percent support was needed for a local poll to be held. Polls were almost always demanded when councils agreed to introduce Māori wards, and only a single poll, in Wairoa, confirmed the establishment of a Māori ward. Opponents of the polls, including Local Government New Zealand president Dave Cull and New Plymouth mayor Andrew Judd, had maintained that the existence of polls on Māori wards but not other representation arrangements was discriminatory and harmful to race relations. A legislative attempt to outlaw Māori ward polls in 2017 was unsuccessful.

In mid-2018, local councils' efforts to introduce Māori wards in Palmerston North, Western Bay of Plenty, Whakatāne, Manawatu, and Kaikōura had been defeated at local referendums. By November 2020, nine further councils had agreed to introduce Māori wards or constituencies in Gisborne, Kaipara, New Plymouth, Ruapehu, South Taranaki, Tauranga, Taupō, Whangārei and the Northland Region. In response to the council decisions, lobby groups Hobson's Pledge and Democracy Northland began organising poll demand petitions in some communities, including Tauranga and Northland. While a valid petition was eventually received in Tauranga, it was ultimately invalidated by the law change.

In early December 2020, advocacy group ActionStation and Māori ward campaigners Toni Boynton and Danae Lee collected 10,000 signatures calling for Parliament to eliminate legislation allowing referendums on Māori wards on local and regional councils. A previous petition "to make the establishment of Māori wards on district councils follow the same legal framework as establishing other wards on district councils", which had been organised by Judd, was considered by parliament's justice committee between 2016 and 2019. The committee was divided between Labour and National members and could not agree how to proceed.

== Legislation ==
The Local Electoral (Māori Wards and Māori Constituencies) Amendment Bill seeks to align the treatment of Māori wards and constituencies with the treatment of general wards and constituencies; eliminate all mechanisms for binding polls to be held on the establishment of Māori wards and polls; and provide local bodies with the opportunity to make decisions on Māori wards and constituencies prior to the local body elections scheduled for 2022.

To achieve these policy goals, the Local Electoral Amendment Bill repeals:

1. the provisions in the Local Electoral Act 2001 relating to polls on the establishment of Māori wards and Māori constituencies;
2. prohibits local councils from initiating binding polls on whether to establish Māori wards or Māori constituencies (while retaining the right of councils to initiate non-binding polls to gauge public sentiment); and
3. establishes a transition period ending on 21 May 2021 in which any local authorities may establish Māori wards or Māori constituencies for the 2022 local elections.

== Legislative history ==
=== First reading ===
On 1 February 2021, Minister of Local Government Nanaia Mahuta announced that the New Zealand Government would be introducing legislation to uphold local councils' decisions to establish Māori wards. On 7 February, The New Zealand Herald reported that the Government would introduce the Local Electoral Amendment Bill under urgency on 9 February. In response, the opposition National Party leader Judith Collins confirmed that her party would oppose the new legislation, claiming that New Zealanders had not been properly consulted.

The Bill passed its first reading at the New Zealand Parliament on 9 February by a margin of 77:41. The ruling Labour Party, allied Green Party and the opposition Māori Party voted in favour of the law while the National Party and the libertarian ACT Party opposed it. On 10 February, the Chairperson of Parliament's Māori Affairs Committee issued an invitation for public submissions on the Local Electoral Amendment Bill. Submissions were open for two days; despite the truncated submission period, 12,508 submissions were received.

=== Second and third readings ===
On 23 February 2021, the Local Government Amendment Bill passed its second reading by a margin of 77:43 along partisan lines. The Labour, Green, and Māori parties supported the bill while the National and ACT parties opposed it. That same day, the Bill passed its third reading by a margin of 77:43 along party lines. The National Party staunchly opposed the bill, staging a 12-hour filibuster opposing the Bill's ten clauses and vowing to repeal the bill if elected at the 2023 New Zealand general election.

=== Assent ===
On 1 March 2021, the Local Electoral (Māori Wards and Māori Constituencies) Amendment Bill received royal assent and was implemented into law.

== Implementation and outcome ==
Through the transition period to 21 May 2021, 32 councils resolved to introduce Māori wards or Māori constituencies ahead of the 2022 local elections. This made for a total of 34 councils with Māori wards at the election, not including Tauranga City Council where elections were deferred until 2024. Councils undertook representation reviews through 2021 and 2022 resulting in the creation of 66 positions for councillors to be elected from Māori wards or constituencies.

After nominations for the elections closed, Local Government New Zealand said the competition was higher in the Māori seats with an average 2.2 candidates per seat compared to the historical average of 2 candidates per seat.

== 2024 law change ==
In late November 2023, the Sixth National Government pledged to "restore the right of local referendum on the establishment or ongoing use of Māori wards."

In April 2024, the Local Government Minister Simeon Brown announced that local and regional councils that introduced Māori wards without polling residents would have to hold referendums during the 2025 New Zealand local elections or dissolve the wards they had established prior to the 2025 local elections. Brown also announced that the government would introduce legislation restoring the right to referendums on Māori wards by the end of July 2024.

In May 2024, 54 mayors and regional council chairpersons including Mayor of Palmerston North Grant Smith and Mayor of Central Otago Tim Cadogan issued a joint letter criticising the Government's proposed law change to require local councils to hold referendums on having Māori wards and constituencies, describing it as "an overreach on local decision-making." In response, Brown along with New Zealand First leader Winston Peters and ACT Party David Seymour defended the proposed legislation as a restoration of local democracy.

On 30 July 2024, the Government passed the Local Government (Electoral Legislation and Māori Wards and Māori Constituencies) Amendment Act 2024, which "restored the right of local referendum on the establishment or ongoing use of Māori wards." Under the new legislation, councils that have already established a Māori ward without a referendum would be required to hold a binding poll during the 2025 New Zealand local elections or to disestablish them. The act also reinstated the provisions of the Local Electoral Act 2001 including the five percent threshold needed to petition local councils for a referendum and the simple majority needed to bind the council to an outcome, effectively repealing the provisions of the Local Electoral (Māori Wards and Māori Constituencies) Amendment Act 2021.

While National, ACT and NZ First supported the bill as part of their coalition agreements, it was opposed by the Labour, Green, and Māori parties. During the third reading, Brown said that the Government was supporting local democracy by giving local communities the right to decide whether to establish Māori wards in their communities. By contrast, Labour leader Chris Hipkins accused the Government of discriminating against Māori and promoting division. Similarly, Te Pāti Māori MP Mariameno Kapa-Kingi described the law change as an attack on the Treaty of Waitangi and an attempt to silence Māori.
