= He Puapua =

2019 New Zealand government report

He Puapua ('A Break') is a 2019 report commissioned by the New Zealand Government to inquire into and report on appropriate measures to achieve the goals set out by the United Nations Declaration on the Rights of Indigenous Peoples. The report was conducted by the Ministry of Māori Development who in August 2019 set up a "Declaration Working Group" of four government officials and five non-state representatives. The report was returned to the Māori Development Minister in December 2019, but was not released until the opposition were leaked a copy and made the document public in 2021.

The report gives a roadmap to giving effect to the principles set out in the UN declaration by 2040, the year which marks the 200th anniversary of the signing of the Treaty of Waitangi. The working group's main objective, as set out in the report, was to "recommend a refocus on rangatiratanga Māori" ("Māori self-determination").

He Puapua remained hidden from public view until May 2021, when it was leaked to the opposition National and ACT parties, who subsequently released the report to the public. The report's publication sparked significant controversy and a debate on the constitutional foundation of the country.

Following the 2023 election, the National Party's coalition agreement with New Zealand First included the line item: "Stop all work on He Puapua".

== History ==
=== United Nations Declaration on the Rights of Indigenous Peoples ===
In 2007, the United Nations issued the Declaration on the Rights of Indigenous Peoples. 144 nations voted in favour of the declaration, while the United States, Australia, Canada and New Zealand voted against, with 11 other nations abstaining. The declaration affirms indigenous people as having the same rights as all other people, and seeks to protect and promote indigenous culture, as well as recognise rights to land and resources. The indigenous people of New Zealand are the Māori and the Moriori.

At the time, the Clark government did not support the declaration because it did not consider it fit for New Zealand's constitutional arrangements, or the pattern of Treaty of Waitangi settlements. Minister of Māori Affairs Parekura Horomia described the declaration as "toothless", and said: "There are four provisions we have problems with, which make the declaration fundamentally incompatible with New Zealand's constitutional and legal arrangements." Article 26 in particular, "appears to require recognition of rights to lands now lawfully owned by other citizens, both indigenous and non-indigenous. This ignores contemporary reality and would be impossible to implement."

=== Recognition ===
In 2009, the Australian government reversed their decision and decided to join the declaration. Additionally, Canada and the United States, under the Obama administration, signalled that they would do the same.

On July 7, 2009, Pita Sharples, now the Minister of Māori Affairs in support with the minority Key government, announced that the government would support the declaration; this, however, appeared to be a premature announcement, as the New Zealand government cautiously backtracked on Sharples's July announcement. However, on April 19, 2010, Sharples was able to announce New Zealand's support of the declaration at a speech in New York.

Prime Minister John Key said New Zealand's endorsement of a declaration on indigenous rights would not change "our fundamental laws or constitution". Additionally, Key stated that it was "a good day for New Zealand" following Sharples's announcement of support for the declaration.

Following this announcement, the government came under attack from ACT Party leader Rodney Hide, who stated that the declaration was a breach of ACT's "no surprises" agreement with the government, and afforded Māori rights and privileges not enjoyed by other New Zealanders.

Opinions on the legal consequences of signing up to the declaration were split.

== Report ==
In August 2019, the Declaration Working Group (DWG) was established by the Labour – New Zealand First government led by Jacinda Ardern. The aim of this working group was to commission a plan and create greater vision in implementing the recommendations of the declaration. The government never released the full report publicly but an unredacted version was leaked to the National Party which published it in April 2021.

=== Introduction ===
The report states that the purpose of the declaration is to provide a roadmap to achieve a "Vision 2040", the year which marks the bicentenary of the signing of the Treaty of Waitangi.

New Zealand is described as being comparatively advanced globally in providing for the inclusion of Māori in terms of government and culture, however the report claims that there is still work to be done. As stated in the report: "The main contribution of the Declaration Working Group is to recommend a re-focus on Māori self-determination)." Self determination and how it is exercised is described as being left to indigenous peoples to determine.

However, it is defined as ranging from participation in government at one end, to full independence at the other. It is noted that in-between are self-government agreements and autonomy in particular areas, such as independent ethnic based education and healthcare services. The context of this is further emphasised.

"The context for the creation of a Declaration plan is the long-standing Māori assertion of the right to exercise rangatiratanga and protect our land and territories. This includes, since the 1920s, engagement in international affairs for recognition of our rights under the Treaty of Waitangi. The context also includes New Zealand's support for the Declaration in 2010, commitment to a Declaration plan in 2014, and UN human rights bodies' support for a Declaration Plan.

The report accentuates the idea that New Zealand has reached a state of maturity, and is now in the position to undertake the transition necessary to restructure governance to realise Māori authority. Existing government initiatives, laws and policy, and jurisprudence are highlighted in particular.

He Puapua acknowledges that the scope of UNDRIP is quite significant, and may be subject to include almost every aspect of relations between Māori authority and the Crown. In acknowledgement of this, the report has divided its roadmap aims into 5 distinct realization themes: Authority and Jurisprudence, Government and Crown Relations, Lands, Territories, and Resources, Culture, and Equity.

The report acknowledges that the government's priority points of wellbeing, inclusivity and pride are in line with the roadmap. In particular the rights and interests of Māori who are disabled, women, elderly, youth, children, as well as LGBTQI+ communities are to be particularly emphasised.

=== Vision 2040 Declaration realisation ===
He Puapua outlines a structure in which to outline the goals of Vision 2040, structured around five key areas.

==== 1. Authority and jurisprudence ====
- Māori will be exercising exclusive and/or shared authority over claimed land, territories and resources and over matters related with sacred land and culture.
- Tribal/clan governance structures will be established, with their authority recognised.
- Māori procedures and customs will be functioning and applicable across New Zealand under Māori authority, and under Crown authority where applicable.

==== 2. Government and crown relations ====
- Māori participation in central and local government will be strong and secure.
- Māori will have a meaningful, and sometimes dominant voice in resource management decisions.
- There will be strong protections for the Treaty of Waitangi and United Nations recognised human rights in state law and policy.
- Māori will be providing for Māori.

==== 3. Lands, territories and resources ====
- The nation will know and appreciate tribal boundaries, where the practice of overt tribal control is evident.
- There will be an enlarged tribal estate, supported by significantly increased return of Crown lands and waters, including coasts, foreshore and seabed rights, to Māori ownership. (This is in addition to Treaty of Waitangi settlement claims).
- Law, policy and processes will support iwi tribal territories, including where iwi can positively contribute towards the control of, access to, and management of all lands and resources within their territorial claims, in accordance with Māori customs and knowledge.
- There will be a greater relinquishment of Crown government authority over land, resources and sacred/protected areas.
- Law, policy, processes and entities will support a bicultural system of governance and management.

==== 4. Culture ====
- Iwi will be exercising authority over all aspects of their culture, including the ability to control, protect and develop their cultural and natural heritage.
- Māori language will be flourishing, its use will be widespread, and its integrity will be protected.
- All Māori will have the opportunity to access, practice and develop their culture and language, connect with their ancestors, and be confident in their ethnic identity.
- All New Zealanders will embrace and respect Māori culture as an integral part of national identity.

==== 5. Equity ====
- New Zealand will be a nation where Māori will be thriving and prosperous in all aspects of life, including access generations.
- There will be equality of outcome between peoples, which means that Māori authority is recognised and respected.
- There will be genuine partnership bodies in the relational sphere.
- All Māori will enjoy equality of outcome.
- New Zealand's understanding of wellbeing will incorporate a Māori perspective.

== Working group ==
The Declaration Working Group was made up of the following members:

- Claire Charters – Chairwoman
- Kayla Kingdon-Bebb
- Tamati Olsen
- Waimirirangi Ormsby
- Emily Owen
- Judith Pryor
- Jacinta Ruru
- Naomi Solomon
- Gary Williams

== Implementation ==
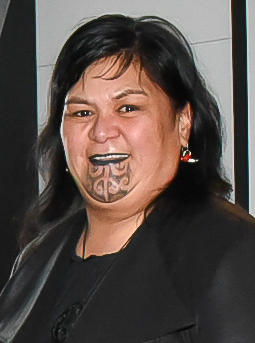
Local Government Minister Nanaia Mahuta

He Puapua was not acknowledged as official government policy, with Prime Minister Jacinda Ardern stating that her government did not publicly release He Puapua "because of a concern that it would be misconstrued as government policy". However, several steps have been taken in order to implement the declaration specified in the report.

=== Māori Electoral Wards ===
On 1 February 2021, Minister of Local Government Nanaia Mahuta announced that the New Zealand Government would be introducing legislation to uphold local councils' decisions to establish Māori wards and constituencies. On 7 February, The New Zealand Herald reported that the government would introduce the Local Electoral Amendment Bill under urgency on 9 February.

In response, the National Party leader Judith Collins confirmed that her party would oppose the new legislation, stating that New Zealanders had not been consulted on these changes. The bill passed its third reading in the New Zealand Parliament on 24 February by a margin of 77:41. The ruling Labour Party, allied Green Party and the Māori Party voted in favour of the law while the National Party and the ACT Party opposed it.

=== Māori Health Authority ===
In April 2021, Minister of Health Andrew Little announced the creation of an independent Māori Health Authority to set some Māori health strategy and policies, and oversee the commissioning of some Māori health services. The proposed organisation was criticised by the opposition New Zealand National Party for promoting alleged racial "separatism."

In response, Associate Health Minister Ayesha Verrall claimed that the Māori Health Authority would ensure Māori input in funding and improve Māori health outcomes. In mid-September 2021, the government announced the interim board members of the Health Authority, whose membership included co-chairs Sharon Shea (chair of the Bay of Plenty District Health Board), Tipa Mahuta (Deputy Chair of the Counties Manukau District Health Board), and Lady Tureiti Moxon.

=== Education curriculum ===
Then Education Minister Chris Hipkins commenced work on introducing a new New Zealand history curriculum that would reflect Māori oriented history, colonisation and the impact of power and privilege. The new education curriculum will primarily cover the following themes:

- The Arrival of Māori to New Zealand.
- First encounters and early colonial history of New Zealand.
- The Treaty of Waitangi and its history.
- Colonisation of, and immigration to, New Zealand, including the New Zealand Wars.
- Evolving national identity of New Zealand in the late 19th and early 20th Centuries.
- New Zealand's role in the Pacific.
- New Zealand in the late 20th century and evolution of a national identity with cultural plurality.

=== Land reform ===
The Department of Conservation is consulting on proposals to transfer Public Conservation Land, reform conservation governance to reflect Treaty Partnership at all levels, and provide for the delegation, transfer and devolution of functions and powers to Māori people.

=== Infrastructure and water ===
Te Mana o Te Wai was set up by the Labour government to provide an elevated role for Māori in decision-making, and work on Māori rights and interests in freshwater. Local Government Minister Nanaia Mahuta began work on the implementation of a set of entities to transfer management of drinking water and wastewater. Mahuta proposed that each entity is run on a co-governance model where half of entity board members will be elected and the other half represent mana whenua. Auckland Mayor Phil Goff pointed out this will mean the organisation will lack ratepayer accountability and risks becoming self-serving.
