= Tara McAllister =

New Zealand freshwater ecology academic

Tara G McAllister
- Education: University of Canterbury
- Awards: Zonta Science Award (2022); Royal Society Te Apārangi Te Kōpūnui Māori Research Award (2022)
- Scientific career
- Fields: Freshwater ecology, mātauranga Māori
- Workplaces: University of Auckland
- Thesis: Phormidium accrual cycles in Canterbury rivers: the effects of nutrients and flow (2018)
- Academic advisors: Susie Wood, Ian Hawes

Tara G McAllister is a New Zealand freshwater ecology academic and is associated with Te Pūnaha Matatini at the University of Auckland. She is a Māori of Te Aitanga ā Māhaki, Ngāti Porou, and European descent.

== Academic career ==
McAllister's 2018 freshwater ecology PhD titled 'Phormidium accrual cycles in Canterbury rivers: the effects of nutrients and flow' at the University of Canterbury, looked at the cyanobacteria Phormidium in predominantly braided rivers in South Canterbury. She then moved to the University of Auckland. In 2021 McAllister received a MBIE Science Whitinga Fellowship.

McAllister's specialties include cyanobacteria in freshwater, mātauranga Māori and co-development of research with iwi, and has been used as an expert in media discussion on water toxicity and water shortage issues.

With Sereana Naepi and others, she has published a series of papers on biases in New Zealand universities, particularly racial and gender biases, which have received wide attention.

When a group of seven professors at the University of Auckland published a letter stating that mātauranga Māori (the traditional knowledge of the Maori people) was not science, McAllister said "we did not navigate to Aotearoa on myths and legends. We did not live successfully in balance with the environment without science. Māori were the first scientists in Aotearoa." The Tertiary Education Union, Royal Society Te Apārangi and New Zealand Association of Scientists and their own vice-chancellor were also critical of the letter. However, some prominent New Zealand and overseas scientists publicly supported the letter.

== Awards ==
In 2022, McAllister was awarded the 17th Biennial Zonta Science Award. In November of the same year McAllister was awarded the Royal Society Te Apārangi Te Kōpūnui Māori Research Award "for research into the underrepresentation and undervaluing of Māori academics".

== Selected works ==
- McAllister, Tara G., Susanna A. Wood, and Ian Hawes. "The rise of toxic benthic Phormidium proliferations: a review of their taxonomy, distribution, toxin content and factors regulating prevalence and increased severity." Harmful Algae 55 (2016): 282–294.
- McAllister, T. G.,J. Kidman, O. Rowley, and R. F. Theodore. "Why isn't my professor Māori?" Mai Journal 8, no. 2 (2019): 235–249.
- Wood, Susanna A., Craig Depree, Logan Brown, Tara McAllister, and Ian Hawes. "Entrapped sediments as a source of phosphorus in epilithic cyanobacterial proliferations in low nutrient rivers." PLoS One 10, no. 10 (2015): e0141063.
- Naepi, Sereana, Tara G. McAllister, Patrick Thomsen, Marcia Leenen-Young, Leilani A. Walker, Anna L. McAllister, Reremoana Theodore, Joanna Kidman, and Tamasailau Suaaliia. "The pakaru ‘pipeline’: Māori and Pasifika pathways within the academy." The New Zealand Annual Review of Education 24 (2020): 142-159.
- Wood, Susanna A., Laura T. Kelly, Keith Bouma‐Gregson, Jean‐François Humbert, Haywood Dail Laughinghouse IV, James Lazorchak, Tara G. McAllister et al. "Toxic benthic freshwater cyanobacterial proliferations: challenges and solutions for enhancing knowledge and improving monitoring and mitigation." Freshwater Biology 65, no. 10 (2020): 1824–1842.
