= Hobson's Pledge =

New Zealand lobbying group opposing equitable measures for Māori

- Leader: Don Brash
- Founded: September 2016; 10 years ago
- Ideology: Anti-affirmative action; Conservatism; Right-wing populism
- Political position: Right-wing to far-right

Website
- www.hobsonspledge.nz

Hobson's Pledge is a lobby group in New Zealand that was formed in late September 2016 to oppose affirmative action for Māori people. It is led by conservative politician Don Brash. It supports abolishing the Māori electorates and the Waitangi Tribunal, restricting tribal powers and "remove all references in law and in Government policy to Treaty 'partnership' and 'principles'".

The group played a significant role in lobbying ACT New Zealand, and indirectly the New Zealand National Party, into opposing the Local Electoral (Māori Wards and Māori Constituencies) Amendment Act 2021, and putting forward the failed Treaty Principles Bill. The group attracted criticism for the use of a non-consenting Māori woman in their advertisements during the 2025 Māori ward referendums. Hobson's Pledge has been accused of by a spectrum of mostly Māori and left-leaning politicians and public figures of spreading disinformation, which it has strongly denied. In 2018, the University of Auckland issued an apology for describing the group as "a racist and militantly anti-Māori group".

== Goals and positions ==
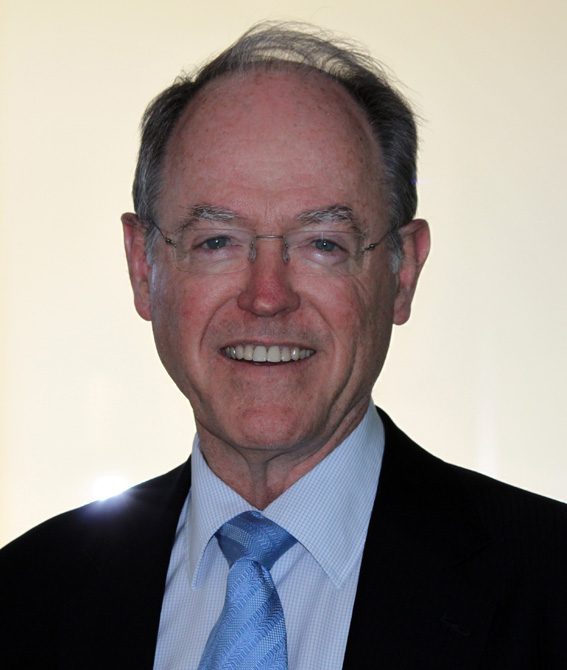
Hobson's Pledge leader Don Brash, formerly leader of the National and ACT parties

Hobson's Pledge is named after William Hobson, the first governor of New Zealand and co-author of the Treaty of Waitangi. Hobson's quote on the day of the first signing of the Treaty, "he iwi tahi tātou", has been used by the group to market their beliefs, with the common translation of the phrase: "we are now one people". The group’s stated goal is “ensuring that the state treats all people fairly and consistently [and] not as separate groups defined by ancestry”.

The group is led by former National Party and ACT leader Don Brash, who delivered the controversial Orewa Speech in 2004 on race relations in New Zealand. Other key members include Casey Costello who is a Māori of Ngāpuhi heritage. Hobson's Pledge advocates abolishing the reserved Māori seats in the New Zealand Parliament and the Waitangi Tribunal, eliminating race-based affirmative action, and cites the Treaty of Waitangi as evidence that Māori chiefs ceded sovereignty in 1840.

Hobson's Pledge has lobbied for making English an official language of New Zealand. This was achieved in 2026.

== History and activities ==
=== Opposition to Māori wards ===
In early 2018, Hobson's Pledge supported citizens-initiated local body referendums opposing the establishment of Māori wards and constituencies in Palmerston North, Western Bay of Plenty, Whakatāne, Manawatū, and Kaikōura. Local councils in those districts had voted to establish Māori wards. At that time, the Local Electoral Act 2001 allowed referendums to be held on Māori wards or constituencies if requested by a petition signed by 5% of the electors of a city, district, or council.

Subsequently, Māori wards were rejected in local referendums held in Palmerston North (68.8%), Western Bay of Plenty (78.2%), Whakatāne (56.4%), Manawatū (77%), and Kaikōura (80%) on 19 May 2018. The turnout was about 40%. The results were welcomed by some including Hobson's Pledge leader Don Brash and conservative broadcaster Mike Hosking. However, others including Whakatāne mayor Tony Bonne, Labour MPs Willie Jackson and Tāmati Coffey, as well as former Māori Party co-leader Te Ururoa Flavell were dismayed.

In 2020, nine other councils proposed Māori wards. Hobson's Pledge supported citizens in Tauranga, Whangārei, Kaipara, Northland (regional council), Gisborne, Taupō, Ruapehu, New Plymouth and South Taranaki who organised campaigns to collect signatures. Three days after the Tauranga campaign announced sufficient signatures had been collected to trigger a vote, Local Government Minister Nanaia Mahuta announced that the Local Electoral Act 2001 would be amended to outlaw citizen-referendums on Māori wards. That rendered all petitions null and void. More than 25,000 signatures had been collected. Five areas had petitions validated. In late February 2021, Mahuta's Local Electoral (Māori Wards and Māori Constituencies) Amendment Act 2021 passed into law, eliminating the mechanism for holding referendums on Māori wards and constituencies on local councils.

In July 2024, the Sixth National Government passed legislation reinstating the requirement for local referendums on the establishment or "ongoing use" of Māori wards and constituencies. While National, ACT and NZ First supported the bill, it was opposed by the Labour, Green, and Māori parties. Councils that have already established a Māori ward without a referendum are now required to hold a binding poll alongside the 2025 local elections or to disestablish them.

In August 2025, Hobson's Pledge released a series of advertisements featuring a stock photo of a Māori woman with a moko kauae and the message "My mana doesn't need a mandate – Vote no to Māori wards". The individual woman pictured did not consent to her image being used and was distraught that her image was being used to promote a view she was "staunchly" opposed to. The photo was released on iStock and Shutterstock and labelled "editorial use only"; Hobson's Pledge said that they had followed all legal requirements for their use of the photo. The group took down the billboards and apologised to the affected woman.

In late September 2025, media company Stuff removed a Hobson's Pledge advertisement opposing Māori wards from its websites after receiving feedback on 20 September that the ad was linking to an external website that did not meet the company's terms and conditions. Meanwhile, media company New Zealand Media and Entertainment (NZME) maintained the same advertisement on its websites, stating that it met their criteria for advocacy advertising. In response, Brash accused Stuff of cowering to bullying and intimidation while praising NZME for upholding lawful advocacy in a "free press."

=== Opposition to co-governance ===
Since 2021, Hobson's Pledge has campaigned against proposed co-governance measures and the He Puapua report, calling the proposals "[a] plan to divide New Zealand governance along racial lines".

In August 2023, Radio New Zealand (RNZ) reported that Hobson's Pledge had launched a website and Facebook account called "We Belong Aotearoa." The website was aimed at ethnic immigrant communities and used Māori language terms such as "whiria te tāngata" (weaving the people together). According to RNZ, the website and Facebook account was run by the Campaign Company, which is listed as the registrant of other internet domain names associated with Hobson's Pledge including isthisracist.nz, bottomline.nz and equalhealth.nz. RNZ also reported that Hobson's Pledge's hobsonspledge.nz domain name was registered by the New Zealand Taxpayers' Union. The Union's co-founder Jordan Williams also served as the director of the Campaign Company. In response, Brash defended the "We Belong Aotearoa" website and said that it helped raise awareness about co-governance. Brash also said that using the term Aotearoa, despite Hobson's Pledge's opposition to the term, allowed "We Belong Aotearoa" to reach a wider audience.

=== 2023 general election ===
During the 2023 New Zealand general election, Hobson's Pledge released a series of attack advertisements in late September 2023 targeting Labour Party leader and Prime Minister Chris Hipkins. These ads accused Hipkins and the Labour Government of causing division and having a poor delivery record. These ads were in response to the New Zealand Council of Trade Unions' attack advertisements in early September targeting National Party leader Christopher Luxon. Hipkins had earlier claimed in early September 2023 that Hobson's Pledge along with the New Zealand Taxpayers' Union and Groundswell NZ were National Party surrogates.

=== Foreshore and seabed ===
On 7 August 2024, Hobson's Pledge published a full-page advertisement in The New Zealand Herald calling for the "restoration of the foreshore and seabed to public ownership." The advertisement was controversial and drew criticism from Te Pāti Māori. On 17 October, the Advertising Standards Authority's Complaints Board ruled that three claims in the advertisement were "misleading" and must not be used again. The Authority had received a total of 672 complaints in response to the advertisement and upheld 655 of them.

=== Treaty Principles Bill ===
In November 2024, Hobson's Pledge began a pro-Treaty Principles Bill campaign aimed at the Prime Minister, referring to him as a "scaredy cat" for not supporting the bill further. Hobson's Pledge made an oral submission on the first day of the Select Committee hearings on 27 January 2025, agreeing with principles one and three but not two. Trustee Eliot Ikilei told the committee that principle two is "effectively saying New Zealand will treat people equally, but not really" and that "that is not equality". Ikilei also told the committee that mention of the terms “iwi” and “hapū” should be removed from the bill.

== Reception ==
=== Racism allegations ===
Several observers have accused Hobson's Pledge of inciting racism, division, and disinformation. In 2019, the New Zealand Māori Council requested the Human Rights Commissioner to investigate Hobson's Pledge on the grounds of an "accumulation" of their rhetoric, which the NZMC claimed was inciting racism and violence. In response, leader Don Brash called the claims "absolutely outrageously stupid" and noted he was taking legal advice.

Critics include Labour Party leader Andrew Little, Green Party co-leader Metiria Turei, broadcaster and Labour politician Willie Jackson, Prime Minister John Key, Deputy Mayor of Gisborne Josh Wharehinga, and the New Zealand Māori Council for its calls to abolish affirmative action and opposition to Māori wards and constituencies, which the group call special rights and anti-democratic.

The group itself has fervently denied allegations of racism towards Māori, with Brash stating in response how he is simply against "race-based privilege".
