= Claire Charters =

New Zealand academic

Academic background
- Education: University of Cambridge

Claire Winfield Ngamihi Charters is a New Zealand Māori academic from the Ngāti Whakaue, Tūwharetoa, Ngāpuhi and Tainui iwi (tribes). She specialises in indigenous peoples' rights in international and constitutional law. She is an associate professor in the Faculty of Law at the University of Auckland and co-director of the Aotearoa New Zealand Centre for Indigenous Peoples and the Law.

== Biography ==
Charters is the daughter of Barbara Dawson, a Pākehā, and Richard Charters. Her paternal grandmother was Ihipera Rika, often called Nuki, who was from Ngāti Whakaue. Charters' paternal grandfather was Win Charters, who was a doctor at Rotorua Hospital. Charters grew up in Rotorua and attended Rotorua Girls' High School. She studied law at the University of Otago and at New York University, followed by a PhD at the University of Cambridge. Her thesis focused on the legitimacy of indigenous peoples’ norms under international law.

From 2010 to 2013, Charters was employed by the Office of the United Nations High Commissioner for Human Rights, focusing on the rights of indigenous peoples. In 2017, Charters was appointed an advisor to the United Nations General Assembly, representing indigenous peoples of the Pacific.

In 2017, Charters received a Rutherford Discovery Fellowship from the Royal Society Te Apārangi for a research project entitled: 'Constitutional Transformation to Accommodate Māori in Aotearoa/New Zealand: Lessons from Around the Globe'.

In 2019–20 Charters was the chairwoman of the panel that wrote the controversial report He Puapua.

Charters is one of the University of Auckland interdisciplinary team of Māori and Pacific researchers of the Māpihi: Māori and Pacific Housing Research Centre set up in 2022. Other members include Charmaine 'Ilaiū Talei (Architecture), Sam Manuela (Psychology), Kilisimasi Latu (Engineering), Lena Henry (Urban Planning), Sereana Naepi (Sociology) and Tia Reihana (Dance Studies), it is co-directed by Deidre Brown and Karamia Müller.

In 2023, she joined the Human Rights Commission; her post was in the area of Indigenous Peoples’ rights.

== Personal ==
Charters is married to fellow University of Auckland legal academic Anaru Erueti.

== Publications ==
- Charters, C., & Erueti, A. K. (eds) (2007). Māori property rights and the foreshore and seabed: The last frontier. Wellington: Victoria University Press.
- Charters, C., & Stavenhagen, R. (2009). Making the Declaration work: The United Nations Declaration on the Rights of Indigenous Peoples. Copenhagen: IWGIA.
- Charters, C., Malezer, L., & Tauli-Corpuz, V. (2011). Indigenous voices: The UN Declaration on the Rights of Indigenous Peoples. Oxford: Hart.
- Charters, C., Knight, D. R., & New Zealand Centre for Public Law. (2011). We, the people(s): Participation in governance. Wellington, N.Z: Victoria University Press in association with NZ Centre for Public Law.
- Charters, C. (2023) The Legitimacy of Indigenous Peoples' Norms Under International Law, Cambridge University Press ISBN 978-1-107-15000-3
