= Sereana Naepi =

New Zealand academic

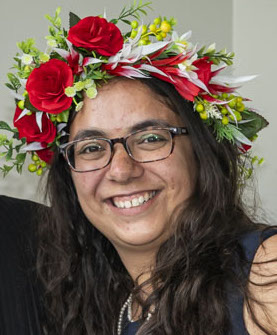
- Naepi in November 2020
- Born: Sereana Patterson
- Education: University of British Columbia
- Scientific career
- Fields: Sociology, equity in higher education
- Workplaces: University of British Columbia, University of Auckland
- Theses: The Voices of Taciqu. Teaching and Learning Practices in Non-Lecture Settings for Māori and Pasifika Success in the First Year of a Bachelor of Arts (2012); Beyond the Dusky Maiden : Pasifika women's experiences working in higher education (2018)
- Doctoral advisor: Vanessa Andreotti

Sereana Naepi (née Patterson) is a New Zealand academic and works at the University of Auckland. She is of Fijian and Pākehā descent.

== Academic career ==
Naepi completed undergraduate study at the University of Auckland. Her 2012 master of arts thesis was titled: The Voices of Taciqu. Teaching and Learning Practices in Non-Lecture Settings for Māori and Pasifika Success in the First Year of a Bachelor of Arts. She moved to Canada for a 2018 PhD titled 'Beyond the Dusky Maiden : Pasifika women's experiences working in higher education' at the University of British Columbia, before returning to the University of Auckland.

In 2021 Naepi received a Royal Society Te Apārangi Rutherford Discovery Fellowship award for 'Planning for Change: An analysis of neoliberalism, equity and change in higher education'.

Naepi is currently co-chair of the Royal Society Te Apārangi's Early Career Researcher Forum and on the MBIE Science Whitinga Fellowship Panel.

Naepi is one of the University of Auckland interdisciplinary team of Māori and Pacific researchers of the Māpihi: Māori and Pacific Housing Research Centre set up in 2022. Other members include Charmaine 'Ilaiū Talei (Architecture), Sam Manuela (Psychology), Kilisimasi Latu (Engineering), Lena Henry (Urban Planning), Claire Charters (Law) and Tia Reihana (Dance Studies), it is co-directed by Deidre Brown and Karamia Müller.

== Selected works ==
- Naepi, Sereana (2019). "Why isn't my professor Pasifika". MAI Journal. 8 (2): 219–234.
- Naepi, Sereana (2015). "Navigating the currents of kaupapa Māori and pan-Pacific research methodologies in Aotearoa New Zealand". MAI Journal. 4 (1): 71–84.
- Ahenakew, Cash; Naepi, Sereana (2015). "The difficult task of turning walls into tables". In Macfarlane, Angus; Macfarlane, Sonja; Webber, Melinda (eds.). Sociocultural realities: Exploring new horizons. pp. 181–194.
- Naepi, Sereana; McAllister, Tara G.; Thomsen, Patrick; Leenen-Young, Marcia; Walker, Leilani A.; McAllister, Anna L.; Theodore, Reremoana; Kidman, Joanna; Suaaliia, Tamasailau (2020). "The pakaru 'pipeline': Māori and Pasifika pathways within the academy". New Zealand Annual Review of Education. 24: 142–159. doi:10.26686/nzaroe.v24i0.6338. hdl:2292/50610. S2CID 216350886.
