= Co-governance =

Co-governance between indigenous Māori and the New Zealand Crown

Co-governance in New Zealand consists of various negotiated arrangements where Māori people and the Crown share decision-making, or Māori exercise a form of self-determination through a devolution of state power. Notable examples include the co-management of natural resources as part of the provision of Māori social services by Māori-focused entities, and statutory Māori representation in local government bodies. In addition Treaty of Waitangi settlements from 2008 often had co-governance agreements where the iwi involved worked with significant rivers, watersheds, coastlines and landmarks.

During the 53rd New Zealand Parliamentary term (2020–2023), the Sixth Labour Government implemented several co-governance arrangements across several public service provisions including healthcare, water management and resource management including Māori wards and constituencies in local government, Te Aka Whai Ora (Māori Health Authority), the Natural and Built Environment Act 2023, and Three Waters reform programme. These expanded co-governance policies attracted vocal opposition from the National, ACT, and New Zealand First parties.

Following the 2023 New Zealand general election, the newly-formed National-led coalition government has announced that it would reverse several of Labour's public service co-governance policies including the Māori Health Authority.

== Definitions ==
There are various definitions for co-governance within a New Zealand framework. The Human Rights Commission has defined co-governance as "the various arrangements where Māori and the New Zealand Crown share decision-making power or where Māori exercise a form of self-determination, albeit as a delegation of state power." Notable examples of co-governance arrangements include the co-management of natural resources as part of Treaty of Waitangi settlements, the provision of social services to Māori by Māori-focused entities such as Te Aka Whai Ora (the Māori Health Authority), and the guaranteed inclusion of Māori in local governance (via Māori wards and constituencies).

Massey University senior lecturer Giles Dodson describes co-governance as "arrangements in which ultimate decision-making authority resides with a collaborative body exercising devolved power – where power and responsibility are shared between government and local stakeholders." Dodson distinguishes co-governance from co-management, stating that the former deals with strategic matters while the latter deals with operational administrative responsibilities including decision making and problem-solving.

Former Attorney-General and Minister for Treaty of Waitangi Negotiations Chris Finlayson has likened co-governance to co-management, stating that "it is not an opportunity to micromanage the officials' work, but a chance to set priorities and to have a say in how to manage a resource." Within a national framework, former Te Whatu Ora (Health New Zealand) Chair and ethical business advocate Rob Campbell has described the framing of co-governance as "sharing responsibility between Māori and [Pākehā]." According to Campbell, the most common co-governance arrangements are those "between the Crown and some tangata whenua ("People of the Land") structure, often one created by the Crown for the purpose, to partially accommodate Treaty of Waitangi obligations."

University of Auckland Māori studies Professor Margaret Mutu has described co-governance as "we [Māori] making decisions about their own lives, the government making its own decisions about its people's lives, and both parties meeting to make decisions on matters that relate to us both." Mutu authored the He Puapua report, which was commissioned by the New Zealand Government in 2019 to investigate how New Zealand could fulfill the goals of the 2007 United Nations Declaration on the Rights of Indigenous Peoples.

== Implementation ==
=== Resource management ===
Notable co-governance arrangements for resource management include the Waikato River Authority, the Tūpuna Maunga o Tāmaki Makaurau Authority managing the Auckland volcanic field, the Te Waihora Co-Governance Agreement governing Lake Ellesmere in Canterbury, the Rotorua Te Arawa Lakes Strategy Group, Tauranga's Ngā Poutiriao o Mauao, the Maungatautari Ecological Island Trust in Waikato, the Ngāti Whātua Ōrākei Reserves Board, the Parakai Recreation Reserve Board, Ngāi Tūhoe and the Department of Conservation's shared management of Te Urewera's forests and lakes, and the Te Awa Tupua (Whanganui River settlement).

In 2003, the Bay of Plenty Regional Council and the Rotorua District Council established a joint committee known as the Rotorua Te Arawa Lakes Strategy Group, which grew to include the Te Arawa Māori Trust Board. The Strategy Group became responsible for managing the Lakes of Rotorua catchment area, which consisted of 12 large Rotorua lakes and their catchments. In 2006, the committee was given formal status after the Te Arawa Lakes Settlement Act 2006 transferred ownership of the lakebeds back to the Te Arawa people. In 2007, the Crown signed a memorandum with the two local government councils and the Te Arawa Māori Trust Board to manage the water quality of the Lakes of Rotorua catchment area.

In 2008, the Waikato-Tainui tribe (iwi) and the New Zealand Government reached a settlement over the tribe's claim to the Waikato river. This settlement was reviewed and out of that came the Waikato-Tainui Raupatu Claims (Waikato River) Settlement Act 2010, which established the Waikato River Authority as part of a co-governance and co-management framework between the Crown and five local iwi (Tainui, Te Arawa, Ngāti Tūwharetoa, Ngāti Raukawa, and Maniapoto). Reflecting the Authority's co-governance structure, its ten-member board consists of five tribal members and five Crown members (including one regional council member and one territorial authority member). The board operate under consensus decision-making and their vision and strategy is long-term, further than a political cycle, to restore and protect the health of the river for generations to come.

Following treaty settlement negotiations between 2010 and 2012, the Ngā Mana Whenua o Tāmaki Makaurau Collective Redress Act 2014 transferred ownership of the 14 volcanoes within the Auckland volcanic field to Ngā Mana Whenua o Tāmaki Makaurau (the collective group representing the 13 iwi and hapū (sub-tribes) of Auckland). The Redress Act created a Tūpuna Maunga o Tāmaki Makaurau Authority with a co-governance leadership structure consisting of six tribal representatives, six Auckland Council representatives and one non-voting Crown representative. In addition, the Redress Act split the management of the 14 volcanoes between the Authority, Department of Conservation (DOC) and Auckland Council. As part of the treaty settlement DOC administers North Head and Auckland Council administers Mount Smart. In addition, the Crown owns Māngere Mountain's land and part of Maungakiekie / One Tree Hill but the Authority administers the two sites for the purposes of the Reserves Act 1977.

In March 2012, the Mauao Trust, with the support of the Tauranga Moana Iwi Collective, proposed a joint administering body relationship with the Tauranga City Council for the Mauao Historic Reserve. In July 2004, the Crown had agreed to transfer the reserve's fee simple estate to three local iwi in Tauranga: the Ngāi Te Rangi, Ngāti Ranginui, Ngāti Pūkenga. These three iwi subsequently established the Mauao Trust in July 2007 to represent their interests. In mid 2013, the Mauoa Trust and City Council reached a memorandum of understanding and established Ngā Poutiriao o Mauao to jointly run the Mauoa Historic Reserve.

In 2015 Ngāi Tahu iwi, the Crown, and Canterbury Regional Council reached a formal co-governance arrangement to manage Lake Ellesmere / Te Waihora and its surrounding catchment. In 1998, the Government had transferred ownership of Te Waihora's lakebed to Ngāi Tahu as part of a Treaty of Waitangi settlement. Ngāi Tahu's Te Waihora Management Board subsequently worked with DOC to develop a joint management plan for the Lake Ellesmere lakebed and surrounding land. This resulted in the 2009 Canterbury Water Management Strategy, which led to the 2015 co-governance arrangement.

In 2023, the Green Party of Aotearoa announced a NZ$100 million Moana Fund for iwi and hapū to carry out coastal restoration projects around the Sugar Loaf Islands near Port Taranaki, which was inspired by the Kaipara Moana Remediation project.

=== Public services delivery ===
During the 53rd New Zealand Parliament (2020–2023), the Sixth Labour Government introduced several co-governance policies and programmes, including entrenching Māori wards and constituencies in local government bodies, rolling out the Three Waters reform programme, creating a Māori Health Authority (Te Aka Whai Ora), and the Natural and Built Environment Act 2023 (as part of efforts to replace the Resource Management Act 1991). The Labour Government's co-governance policies attracted opposition from the opposition National and ACT parties, the Hobson's Pledge lobby group and right-wing activist Julian Batchelor.

During the 2023 New Zealand general election, co-governance was a prominent election issue, with National, ACT, and New Zealand First campaigning for the reversal of several of Labour's co-governance programmes, including Māori wards, Three Waters, the Māori Health Authority and indigenous biodiversity co-management.

In late November 2023, the newly-formed Sixth National Government committed to reversing the Labour Government's public sector co-governance policies as part of its coalition agreement with ACT and New Zealand First. The Government also pledged to "restore the right of local referendum on the establishment or ongoing use of Māori wards."

On 20 December 2023, the National-led coalition government passed legislation repealing the Natural and Built Environment Act as part of its plans to reform the Resource Management Act framework.

On 14 February 2024, the Government passed legislation repealing the previous Labour Government's Three Waters reform programme under urgency. While National, ACT and NZ First supported the bill, it was opposed by the Labour, Green, and Māori parties.

On 28 February 2024, the Government passed urgent legislation disestablishing Te Aka Whai Ora (the Māori Health Authority).

On 30 July 2024, the Government passed legislation restoring the right of local referendum on the establishment or ongoing use of Māori wards. National, ACT and NZ First supported the bill and it was opposed by the Labour, Green, and Māori parties.

=== International parallels ===
International examples of co-governance for indigenous peoples include Native American tribal sovereignty in the United States and Sámi parliaments in Finland, Norway, Sweden.

== Political party views and positions ==
In the early 2020s political parties in New Zealand have taken a range of perspectives on co-governance. While the Labour, Green and Māori parties have supported co-governance as a means of honouring the Treaty of Waitangi, National and ACT have supported co-governance in resource management while opposing its extension into the delivery of public services. Meanwhile, New Zealand First has opposed all co-governance arrangements as racially discriminatory and elitist. It has been a contentious matter. On one hand it is argued that it is non-democratic and a misinterpretation of the Treaty of Waitangi, and on the other it is supported as shared decision-making and partnership in governance, as affirmed from the Treaty of Waitangi.

=== Support ===
The Labour Party regards co-governance as a partnership based on cooperation, joint decision-making, and sharing information and expertise. Labour has supported co-governance arrangements such as the Waikato River Authority, which it regarded as a model for its Three Waters reform programme, and the expansion of Māori wards and constituencies in local government bodies.

The Green Party has regarded co-governance as a means of honouring tino rangatiratanga (Māori self-determination) within the framework of the Māori version of the Treaty of Waitangi. The Greens have supported the Moana Fund's coastal restoration projects, which involves Māori iwi (sometimes described as "tribes") and hapū (sub-groups). The party supports co-governance arrangements that have been endorsed by iwi and hapū as authentic.

Te Pati Māori regards co-governance as a way for both the Crown and Māori to find commonality and cooperation in achieving desired goals. The party has endorsed several co-governance arrangements including the Waikato River Authority and the Tūpuna Maunga Authority in Taranaki. In addition to existing resource management arrangements, Te Pati Māori has supported the extension of co-governance to other areas including education and healthcare.

=== Mixed ===
The National Party has supported resource management co-governance arrangements such as the Waikato River Authority, the Tūpuna Maunga o Tāmaki Makaurau Authority, and the Te Awa Tupua (Whanganui River settlement) arrangement. These co-governance arrangements were established as part of Treaty of Waitangi settlements between the Crown and various iwi and hapū, with input from other parties including local governments, farmers, and businesses. Chris Finlayson was the Minister for Treaty of Waitangi Negotiations during many settlements and he has stated: "I do not accept that there is a democratic deficit with co-government agreements." National has opposed the extension of co-governance arrangements into the public services such as the Three Waters reform programme, Te Aka Whai Ora, and Māori wards and councils.

Similarly, the ACT party has supported resource management co-governance arrangements such as the Tūpuna Maunga Authority and the Waikato River Authority. However, the party has opposed the extension of co-governance into the public services. Like National, ACT has advocated repealing the Natural and Built Environment Act 2023, Te Aka Whai Ora, and the Three Waters programme. ACT has also vowed to reverse the introduction of Māori wards and constituencies in local governments. National Party Māori Development spokesperson Tama Potaka said in 2023: "Co-governance agreements have been around for nearly 20 years now and generally work very well".

=== Opposition ===
New Zealand First leader Winston Peters has opposed co-governance, contending that the concept has devolved from cooperation to so-called "racial privilege" and "ethnic elitism." NZ First has rejected the Three Waters programme, claiming it would give local iwi a veto power in decision-making. The party has opposed co-governance in the management of indigenous biodiversity.

In March 2024, Peters controversially likened co-governance to Nazi race-based theory during a state of the nation address. His remarks were described as offensive and inflammatory by Holocaust Centre of NZ spokesperson Ben Kepes and Labour Party leader Chris Hipkins.

In mid-June 2026, Peters said NZ First would campaign on disestablishing the Auckland Council's Independent Māori Statutory Board during the 2026 New Zealand general election as part of their platform against co-governance.

== Public opinion polling ==
Between June and July 2023, a Talbot Mills Research survey found that 29% of respondents supported co-governance while 36% opposed it. Talbot Mills used Dr Margaret Mutu's definition of co-governance, which was predicated around the idea of Māori exercising self-determination over their own lives while simultaneously negotiating with the Crown on issues relating to both Māori and other New Zealanders. Māori and Pasifika were more likely to agree with co-governance compared with Asian and European New Zealanders. Younger New Zealanders also tended to be more supportive. Talbot Mills surveyed 1,100 nationally representative individuals respondents aged 18 years and over, and had a 3 percent margin of error.

In late September 2023, Horizon Research published the results of a survey on how New Zealanders' voting choices were influenced by their views on co-governance, the Treaty of Waitangi, and racial harmony. The study found a large gulf between Māori and European New Zealand voters on the interconnected issues of co-governance and honouring the Treaty. On co-governance, 28% of European voters surveyed claimed that halting co-governance policies was an important influence on their party vote choice, compared with 17% of Māori respondents. 62% of prospective ACT voters opposed co-governance, compared with 45% of New Zealand First prospective voters and 40% of prospective National voters. Regarding the Treaty, 46% of Māori respondents regarded honouring the Treaty as an important influence on their party vote, compared with 20% of European respondents.

== See also ==
- Māori politics
- Julian Batchelor
- Hobson's Pledge
