= Charmaine 'Ilaiū Talei =

New Zealand architect and academic

- Talei in 2026
- Born: Ōtara, Auckland, New Zealand
- Education: University of Auckland
- Occupations: Architect, academic
- Buildings: Fuaʻamotu International Airport

Charmaine 'Ilaiū Talei is an academic and registered architect from Aotearoa New Zealand. She teaches at the University of Auckland, and as an architect has worked on many buildings within the Pacific region including the refurbishment of the Fua'amotu International Airport in Tonga. She started working in the architectural profession in 2009.

== Early life and education ==
‘Ilaiū Talei grew up in Ōtara, Auckland, and is one of eight children. She has Tongan heritage - her parents are Falakika Lose and ‘Ahoia ‘Ilaiū, both from Tonga. Her mother's Tongan heritage is from Houma, Tongatapu, and she also has links to other places in the Pacific, such as Uvea (Wallis and Futuna) and Samoa. Her father's Tongan heritage is from Tatakamōtonga village in Mu’a, Tongatapu and he also has family links to Ha’apai and Fulaga, Lau Islands, Fiji. Her parents came to New Zealand in the early 1970s from Tonga. Her father was a pastor at the New Zealand Assemblies of God church.

'Ilaiū Talei attended Auckland Girls Grammar. While at school she did work experience at Pete Bossley Architects. She completed an undergraduate degree in architecture from University of Auckland in 2006 and went on to masters study there too finishing in 2008. It is stated she was the first Pacifika person at the University of Auckland to graduate with a research-based Master of Architecture. Professor Deidre Brown was her masters supervisor. In 2016 'Ilaiū Talei graduated with a PhD from the Aboriginal research Centre at the School of Architecture and Planning University of Queensland. Her thesis is titled From thatch to concrete block: architectural transformations of Tongan fale (2016).

In an interview with Karamia Muller in the book Making Space 'Ilaiū Talei acknowledges her parents especially her father in their support of her studies, she said: "My Dad has been such a key role in terms of research and education".

== Career ==
‘Ilaiū Talei has been working in the architectural profession since 2009.

In Brisbane, ‘Ilaiū Talei worked in the role of Architectural Discipline Lead for the practice Kramer Ausenco Pacific Limited, which included commercial, educational, healthcare and residential projects in the Solomon Islands, Samoa, Tonga, Vanuatu and Papua New Guinea. Part of her work is specialising in co-design and the process of community engagement. Also in Brisbane she worked for the architectural practice Guymer Bailey. She lived in Brisbane for 11 years.

In 2009 'Ilaiū Talei and Nina Tonga curated an exhibition at the Fresh Gallery called Koloa et al: Your Art is my Treasure. This was an installation of traditional craft and art (koloa) made by Tongan women expressing their thoughts of koloa being a way of life. The exhibition was in collaboration with members of the Tongan women's collective Mo'ui Aonga Tongan Culture Centre.

One building project of ‘Ilaiū Talei's was lead project architect for the refurbishment of the Fua'amotu International Airport in Tonga in 2019.

‘Ilaiū Talei started working at the School of Architecture and Planning at the University of Auckland in 2021. Her colleagues include Karamia Müller and Lama Tome.

It’s been exciting to see a lot more Pacific and Māori students on campus — especially within the architecture school. (Charmaine 'Ilaiū Talei 2022)

She is a member of the professional organisation Architecture + Women NZ. Some of her influences include Hassan Fathy, Alvar Aalto, Malaysian architect Ken Yeang and Zaha Hadid.

At the University of Auckland ‘Ilaiū Talei is part of Māpihi: Māori and Pacific Housing Research Centre which is hosted at the Faculty of Creative Arts and Industries. This was set up in 2022 to improve 'housing quality and supply for Māori and Pacific communities in Aotearoa New Zealand and the Pacific', it is co-directed by Karamia Müller and Deidre Brown. It is an interdisciplinary approach, and other members include Sam Manuela (Psychology), Kilisimasi Latu (Engineering), Lena Henry (Urban Planning), Claire Charters (Law), Sereana Naepi (Sociology) and Tia Reihana (Dance Studies).

One current architectural project is a new building to house the High Court and the District Court in Tauranga with funding of just over $200 million confirmed in July 2023. The commissioning organisation the New Zealand Ministry of Justice said of the project: "This design will reflect Te Ao Māori values and concepts including ‘Hohou te Rongo’, which is about resolution and restoration of balance". (Ministry of Justice, 2023)

=== Publications ===
‘Ilaiū Talei wrote two chapters in the book Vernacular Architecture for a Changing Planet (2019). The chapters are called, ‘Timber and Palm Vernacular of Tonga’ and ‘Navala and Lau Bure of Fiji’. The topics are about architecture resilient against climate change and 'celebrates Indigenous ingenuity from around the globe' including local natural materials 'sustainable and culturally-imbued vernacular architecture'.
