= Te Raukura O'Connell Rapira =

New Zealand community activist (born 1988)

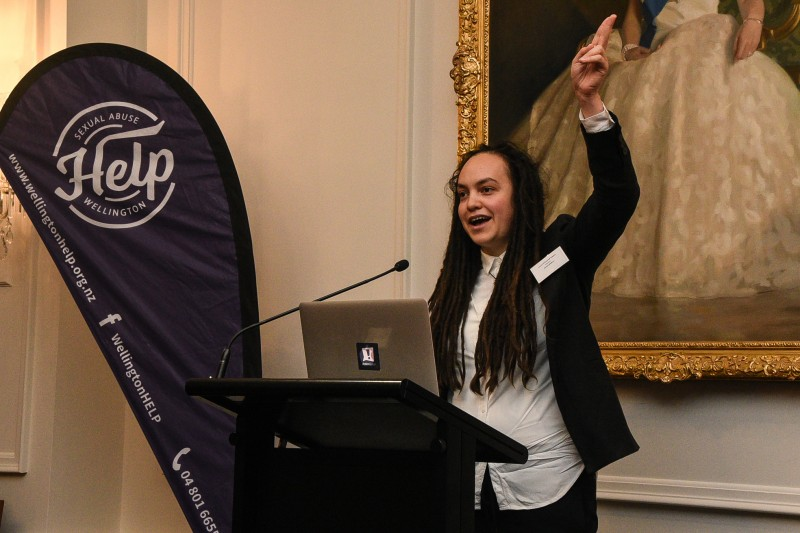
- O'Connell Rapira at a reception for Wellington Sexual Abuse Help! Foundation at Government House, Wellington, New Zealand in June 2019
- Born: Laura O'Connell Rapira; 1988 (age 37–38); New Zealand
- Occupation: Activist

Te Raukura O'Connell Rapira (born Laura O'Connell Rapira; 1988) is a New Zealand speaker and community activist. They advocate for Indigenous land rights, Mana Motuhake, police and prison abolition, fully funded mental and sexual health services, LGBTQIA+ equality, the political power of young people and environmental justice.

== Biography ==
O'Connell Rapira was born in Taranaki and later moved to West Auckland where they attended Green Bay High School. They are Māori of the iwi Te Ātiawa, Ngāruahine, Ngāpuhi, Te Rarawa and Ngāti Whakaue.

As a young person they were part of an accelerator programme for social enterprise initiatives. From this O'Connell Rapira co-founded RockEnrol in 2014 to encourage young people to enrol and vote in New Zealand's general elections. They were a founding team member of ActionStation and a co-founder of Tauiwi Tautoko and the Youth Movement Fund Aotearoa.

In 2020, O'Connell Rapira petitioned the New Zealand government to make Matariki a public holiday. In 2022 the New Zealand government passed the Te Kāhui o Matariki Public Holiday Act and the first Matariki public holiday was held on Friday 24 June 2022. O'Connell Rapira has also been involved in petitioning the New Zealand government for Māori wards, a complete overhaul of Oranga Tamariki, increased government funding for sexual and mental health, gun law reform, violence prevention, increased income support and an end to online hate and abuse.

From 2021 to 2023, O'Connell Rapira was the Executive Director, Movement Building at the Foundation for Young Australians where their focus was on building the political power of youth movements.

In November 2023, O'Connell Rapira launched the Narratives for Change Fellowship with The Workshop in collaboration with their former ActionStaton co-director Marianne Elliott.

O'Connell Rapira is a contributing writer to New Zealand news website The Spinoff and a TEDxChristchurch speaker.

=== Recognition ===
In 2017, O'Connell Rapira was nominated for the Te Whetū Maiangi Award for Young Achievers and the Kiwibank Young New Zealander of the Year.

== Personal life ==
O'Connell Rapira is takatāpui and is frank about this being a driver for them to seek social justice and equality in society. O'Connell Rapira is also vegan.
