= Māori wards and constituencies =

Electoral unit representing Maori

Māori wards and constituencies for urban, district, and regional councils in New Zealand are electoral areas where local constituents registered on the Māori parliamentary electoral roll vote for candidates. Like Māori electorates within the New Zealand Parliament, the purpose of Māori wards and constituencies is to ensure that Māori are represented in local government decision making.

Māori wards and constituencies were first introduced by the Bay of Plenty Regional Council in 2001. Prior to 2021, a local referendum was required to introduce Māori wards limiting adoption. Consequently, attempts to introduce Māori wards and constituencies were defeated at several polls in New Plymouth, Palmerston North, the Western Bay of Plenty, Whakatāne, Manawatu, and Kaikōura.

In late February 2021, the Sixth Labour Government passed the Local Electoral (Māori Wards and Māori Constituencies) Amendment Act 2021, which eliminated the poll provision for establishing Māori wards and constituencies. Consequently, by the 2022 local elections, six of the eleven regional councils (54.5%) had adopted Māori constituencies and 29 of the 67 territorial authorities (43.3%) had Māori wards.

In late November 2023, the Sixth National Government pledged to "restore the right of local referendum on the establishment or ongoing use of Māori wards." On 30 July 2024, Parliament passed a bill that reinstated the previous provisions requiring local referendums on the establishment or ongoing use of Māori wards. Councils that had already established a Māori ward without a referendum were required to hold a binding poll alongside the 2025 local elections or to disestablish them. The final results of the referendums were 24 councils voted to remove them and 18 councils voted to keep them.

== Background ==
Although in 2006 Māori formed 14.6% of New Zealand's population, a Department of Internal Affairs (DIA) survey found that 12% of candidates not elected at the October 2007 local elections were Māori and only 8% of winning candidates were Māori. By contrast the 66% of the population who are European had an 84% chance of losing candidates and a 90% chance of winning. The inequality was marginally smaller in 2016, with 89.8% of elected members being European and 10.1% Māori.

A feature of New Zealand's parliamentary representation arrangements is the system of Māori electorates, which are for electors of Māori descent who choose to be registered on the Māori electoral roll and are intended to give Māori a more direct say in Parliament. Equivalent provisions for local government are set out in section 19Z (and following) of the Local Electoral Act 2001. These provisions are opt-in and allow territorial authorities and regional councils to introduce Māori wards (in cities and districts) or constituencies (in regions) for electoral purposes.

The number of members elected to a council through its Māori wards or constituencies is determined after determining the total number of councillors for the city or district or region, in proportion to the number of members elected to the council through its general wards and constituencies, such that:
$$\mathsf{\text{Number of Māori members}=\frac\text{Māori electoral population}\text{Total electoral population}\times \text{Number of members}}$$
The number of members excludes the mayor, who is elected separately. The total electoral population includes all electors in the city, district or region, regardless of whether they are on the general electoral roll or the Māori electoral roll. The number of Māori members is rounded to the nearest whole number. If the calculated number of Māori members is zero, the council must resolve against having separate Māori and general wards.

Until the passage of the Local Electoral (Māori Wards and Māori Constituencies) Amendment Act 2021 into law, Māori wards and constituencies could be established by decision of the council, or through a local referendum (called, under the Act, a "poll"). If a council resolved to establish Māori wards or constituencies, it had to notify its residents of their right to demand a poll on the establishment of the wards and constituencies (the "poll provision"). If a petition signed by 5 percent of the electors of the city, district or region was presented to the council, the poll must be held within 89 days. All electors (not specifically electors of Māori descent or those on the Māori electoral roll) could demand and vote in a binding poll on Māori wards and constituencies. The result of the poll was binding for two local body elections, after which the council could choose to retain the status quo or adopt another change.

== History ==
=== Introduction ===
Māori wards and constituencies have proved contentious, as the poll provision (outlined above) has frequently overturned councils' decisions. While a general establishment provision has been available since 2002, the first Māori constituencies were established for the Bay of Plenty Regional Council in 2001 under a unique piece of legislation. Population ratios were such that the council was able to establish three Māori constituencies. The introduction of Māori wards and constituencies was supported by the Labour, Alliance, and Green parties, it was opposed by the conservative National Party, the populist New Zealand First Party, and the libertarian ACT Party. (While he supported the 2002 amendment to the Local Electoral Act, the Green Party co-leader, Rod Donald, though not his Party, had opposed the Bay of Plenty legislation due to its compulsory nature and preferring Single Transferable Votes.)

In 2006, the National Party MP for Bay of Plenty, Tony Ryall (who had been Minister of Local Government for six months in 1998–1999), moved a private member's bill seeking the repeal of both pieces of Māori ward legislation, arguing that, since the opt-in provisions in the Local Electoral Act 2001 had not been used in four years, the wards were "unused... antiquated... not necessary [and] divisive." The motion failed.

=== Initial expansion and resistance ===
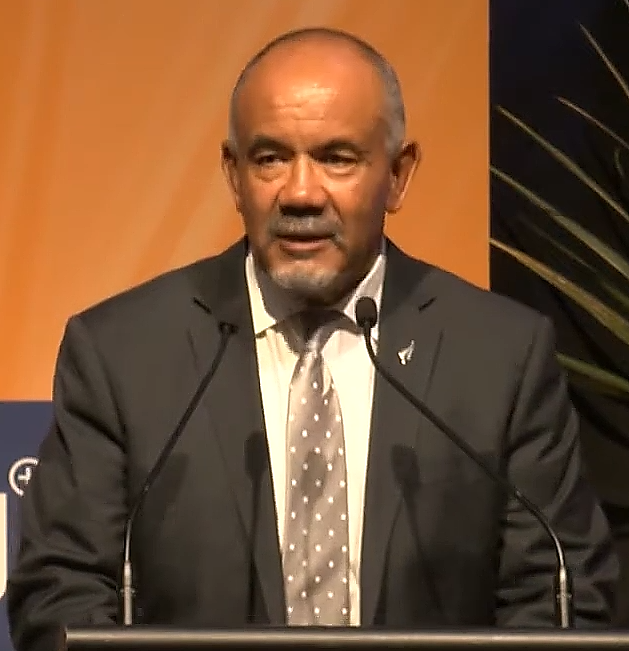
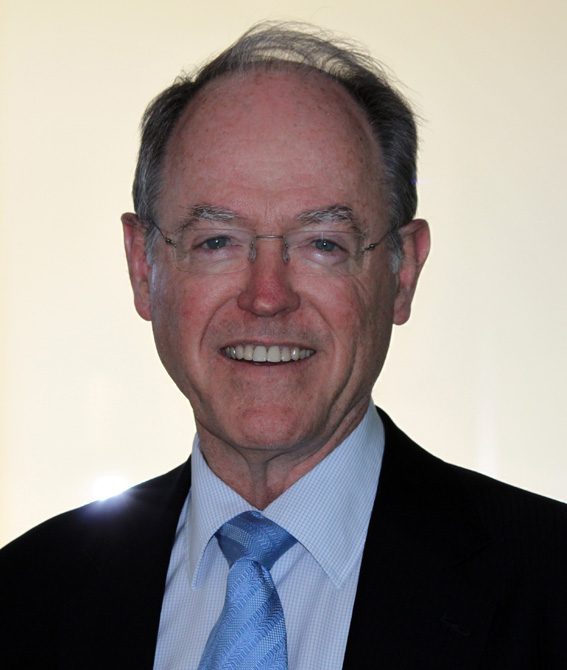
Māori Party MP Te Ururoa Flavell supported the expansion of Māori wards while former politician Don Brash led the Hobson's Pledge group opposing it.

In 2010, Māori Party MP Te Ururoa Flavell sought a law change to make it compulsory for all councils to have Māori seats. At that time, Bay of Plenty Regional Council was still the only local authority to have Māori representation. Flavell's proposal failed, but not before it was declared to be inconsistent with the New Zealand Bill of Rights Act 1990 due to using a different Māori representation formula that the Attorney-General Chris Finlayson stated would "lead to disparity in representation between Māori wards... and general wards." The difference was that the formula used the number of people of Māori descent rather than the number of people on the Māori electoral roll.

In October 2011, the Waikato Regional Council voted 14–2 to establish two Māori seats in preparation for the 2013 local body elections. A poll was not demanded and the constituencies were established. In late October 2017, the Waikato Regional Council voted by a margin of 7–3 to retain both Māori constituencies Nga Hau e Wha and Nga Tai ki Uta.

In 2014, the Mayor of New Plymouth Andrew Judd proposed introducing a Māori ward in the New Plymouth District Council. The council resolved to do so, but was defeated in a 2015 referendum by a margin of 83% to 17%. The backlash Judd experienced was an influence on his decision not to run for a second term during the 2016 local body elections. In April 2016, Flavell, now a Māori Party co-leader, presented a petition to the New Zealand Parliament on behalf of Judd that advocated (as Flavell had done previously) the establishment of mandatory Māori wards on every district council in New Zealand. In June 2017, a private members' bill in the name of Marama Davidson sought to remove the poll provision, but was defeated during its first reading.

A poll on establishing Māori wards at Wairoa District Council was held alongside that council's October 2016 triennial election and was successful; elections for three Māori seats at that council were held in October 2019. Following this result, five territorial authorities (Palmerston North City Council, Kaikōura District Council, Whakatāne District Council, Manawatu District Council, and Western Bay of Plenty District Council) approved, in separate decisions over late 2017, to introduce Māori wards for the 2019 local elections.

In response, the lobby group Hobson's Pledge (fronted by former National Party and ACT New Zealand leader Don Brash) organised several petitions calling for local referendums on the matter of introducing Māori wards and constituencies, taking advantage of the poll provision. These polls were granted and held in early 2018. Each poll failed; Māori wards were rejected by voters in Palmerston North (68.8%), Western Bay of Plenty (78.2%), Whakatāne (56.4%), Manawatu (77%), and Kaikōura (55%) on 19 May 2018. The average voter turnout in those polls was about 40%.

The rejection of Māori wards was welcomed by Brash and conservative broadcaster Mike Hosking. By contrast, the referendum results were met with dismay by Whakatāne Mayor Tony Bonne and several Māori leaders including Labour MPs Willie Jackson and Tāmati Coffey, former Māori Party co-leader Te Ururoa Flavell, Bay of Plenty resident and activist Toni Boynton, and left-wing advocacy group ActionStation national director Te Raukura O'Connell Rapira. In response, ActionStation organised a petition calling on the Minister of Local Government, Nanaia Mahuta, to change the law so that establishing a Māori ward uses the same process as establishing a general ward (general wards are not subject to the poll provision, but have a different appeals process through the Local Government Commission).

The Labour Party has supported changes to the laws regarding Māori wards and constituencies. Two bills were introduced by backbench Labour MP Rino Tirikatene in 2019 (the first a local bill seeking permanent representation for Ngāi Tahu on the Canterbury Regional Council; the second a member's bill to ensure that the repeal of legislation establishing Māori seats in Parliament must be subject to a 75% supermajority of Parliament), but both failed.

== 2021–22 legislative reform ==
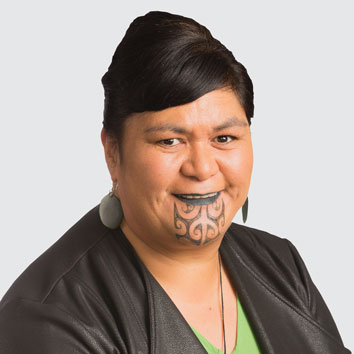
Labour MP and Local Government Minister Nanaia Mahuta introduced legislation in 2021 abolishing the poll requirement for Māori wards and constituencies.

Nine local authorities determined to establish Māori wards ahead of the 2022 New Zealand local elections (Whangarei District Council, Kaipara District Council, Northland Regional Council, Tauranga City Council, Gisborne District Council, Ruapehu District Council, Taupō District Council, New Plymouth District Council, and South Taranaki District Council). While polls for some of those districts were signalled, Minister of Local Government Nanaia Mahuta stated in November 2020 that removing the poll provision was "on her list" for the Sixth Labour Government's second term.

On 1 February 2021, Mahuta announced that the Government would establish a new law upholding local council decisions to establish Māori wards and abolishing the existing law allowing local referendums to veto decisions by councils to establish Māori wards. This law would come into effect before the scheduled 2022 local body elections. On 25 February, Mahuta's Local Electoral (Māori Wards and Māori Constituencies) Amendment Act 2021, which eliminates mechanisms for holding referendums on the establishment of Māori wards and constituencies on local bodies, passed its third reading in Parliament with the support of the Labour, Green and Māori parties. The bill was unsuccessfully opposed by the National and ACT parties, with the former mounting a twelve-hour filibuster challenging all of the Bill's ten clauses.

Councils were also given a fresh opportunity to make decisions about establishing Māori wards after the law change; as a result, at the 2022 local elections, six of the eleven regional councils (54.5%) have Māori constituencies and 29 of the 67 territorial authorities (43.3%) had Māori wards. Until this point, only Bay of Plenty Regional Council, Waikato Regional Council and Wairoa District Council had had elections with Māori wards or constituencies.

Between August and November 2023, Māori wards or constituencies were agreed to be introduced at a further group of councils for the 2025 and 2028 local elections, including Western Bay of Plenty District Council, Hauraki District Council, Whanganui District Council, Thames-Coromandel District Council, Greater Wellington Regional Council, and Upper Hutt City Council. The introduction of Māori wards was lost at Auckland Council in an 11–9 vote that followed two months of consultation. While 68% of non-Māori respondents opposed the Māori wards proposal, 54% of the 1,300 Māori respondents supported them. 87% of the 17 Māori organisations consulted including Te Whānau o Waipareira, supported the proposal. In addition, right-wing lobby group Hobson's Pledge sent councillors 1,200 emails opposing Māori wards.

=== Rotorua Lakes Council local bill ===
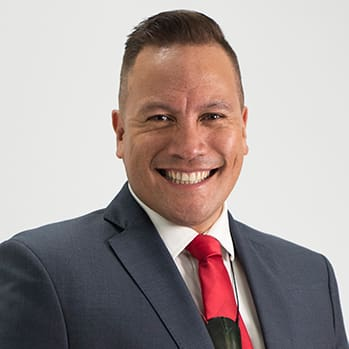
Labour MP Tāmati Coffey sponsored the Rotorua District Council (Representation Arrangements) Bill.

In mid-November 2021, the Rotorua Lakes Council voted to establish a Māori ward. The Māori partnership organisation Te Tatau o Te Arawa expressed disappointment with the council's decision, claiming that it did not provide Māori with adequate representation. While Rotorua District councillors had preferred a governing arrangement consisting of three Māori ward seats, three general seats, and four at-large seats, that model was not lawful under the Local Electoral Act 2001.

In April 2022, Labour Member of Parliament Tāmati Coffey introduced a local bill on behalf of the council, the Rotorua District Council (Representation Arrangements) Bill, seeking an exemption from the Local Electoral Act's requirements preventing the council's preferred 3-3-4 governing arrangement. The Rotorua bill passed its first reading on 6 April 2022 and was referred to the Māori Affairs Committee. The Labour, Green and Māori parties (77 votes) supported the bill while the National and ACT parties opposed the bill. Following complaints about the short two-weeks timeframe for submission, the bill's submission period was extended until 4 May 2022.

In late April 2022, the Attorney General David Parker released a report expressing concern that the proposed Rotorua electoral bill breached the New Zealand Bill of Rights Act 1990 since it discriminated against general roll voters by allocating more seats to Māori ward voters. Rotorua's general roll had 55,600 voters while its Māori roll had 21,700 voters. In response, Māori Development Minister Willie Jackson and Deputy Prime Minister Grant Robertson stated that they would not support the bill in its current form. The National Party's justice spokesperson Paul Goldsmith claimed that the bill breached the principle of "equal suffrage" by giving Māori electoral roll votes 2.5 times the value of general roll votes. Māori Party co-leader Rawiri Waititi defended Coffey's Rotorua Bill, claiming that it gave equal representation to Māori. On 28 April 2022, Coffey and the Rotorua Lakes Council agreed to "pause" the bill's select committee process in order to address the legal issues raised by the Attorney General.

Following the 2022 New Zealand local elections, the Rotorua Lakes Council with the exception of Māori ward councillors Rawiri Waru and Trevor Maxwell voted to withdraw its support for the bill in February 2023.

=== Canterbury Regional Council local bill ===
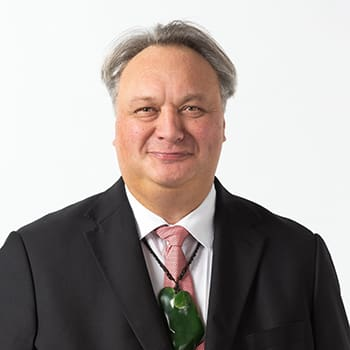
Labour MP Rino Tirikatene sponsored the Canterbury Regional Council (Ngāi Tahu Representation) Bill.

In early December 2021, Rino Tirikatene's local bill on behalf of the Canterbury Regional Council (Environment Canterbury), the Canterbury Regional Council (Ngāi Tahu Representation) Bill, passed its first reading in the New Zealand Parliament by a margin of 77 to 43 votes. While the Labour, Green and Māori parties supported the legislation, it was opposed by the opposition National and ACT parties. The bill proposes adding two seats for Māori tribal Ngāi Tahu representatives to the Environment Canterbury, boosting the body's membership to 16 members. The proposed legislation was supported by Environment Canterbury and the Ngāi Tahu sub-groups Papatipu Rūnanga and Te Rūnanga o Ngāi Tahu.

By 9 February, the Māori Affairs Select Committee had received almost 1,700 submissions regarding the proposed bill. Federated Farmers' South Canterbury chairman Greg Anderson stated that the Ngāi Tahu representatives should be elected either by the tribe or the general Canterbury population.

On 3 July, the Ngāi Tahu Representation Bill passed its third and final reading. The bill's passage was welcomed by the Labour Party and Ngāi Tahu representatives including Tipene O'Regan as a means of ensuring Māori representation at the local government level and upholding the partnership aspects of the Treaty of Waitangi. The opposition National Party vowed to repeal the bill on the grounds that it did not uphold electoral equality for all New Zealanders and did not provide electoral accountability.

== 2024 law change ==
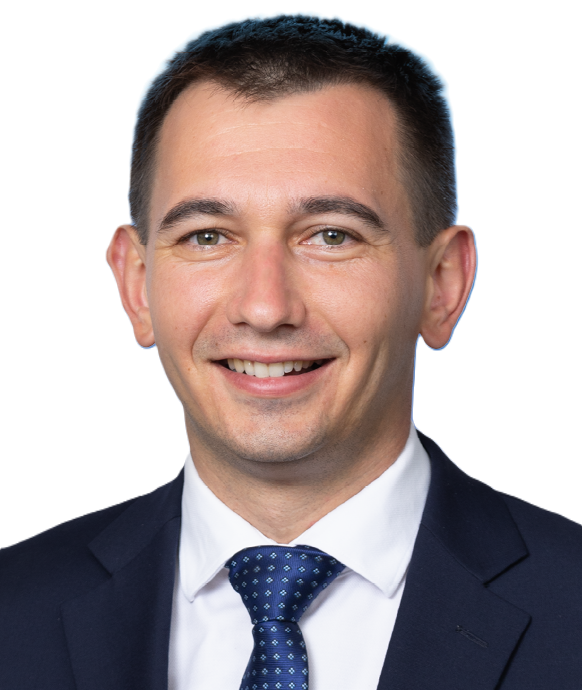
National MP and Local Government Minister Simeon Brown introduced the bill to reinstate poll requirements for Māori wards and constituencies.

In late November 2023, the Sixth National Government pledged to "restore the right of local referendum on the establishment or ongoing use of Māori wards."

In early April 2024, Local Government Minister Simeon Brown announced that the government would introduce legislation restoring the requirement for referendums on Māori wards, with local and regional councils that introduced Māori wards without polling residents having to either hold referendums during the 2025 local elections or, prior to the elections, to dissolve the wards they had established. The Wairoa District, Waikato Region and Bay of Plenty Region councils would be unaffected by the Government proposal since they introduced Māori wards before the removal of poll requirements. The Opotiki District's Māori wards were not affected since they held a poll during the 2022 New Zealand local elections that found majority support for wards. The Tauranga City Council, which had been under the management of commissioners since 2020, held elections in July 2024. Tauranga has the option of reversing its decision to establish Māori wards or holding a poll during the 2024–2028 term, with the outcome taking effect after the 2028 local elections.

Councils that would be affected by the proposed polling requirement included the Stratford District Council, where councillors had voted to introduce a Māori ward during the 2022 local elections without holding a poll. In mid-May 2024, 54 mayors and regional council chairpersons including Local Government New Zealand (LGNZ) President and Mayor of Selwyn Sam Broughton, Mayor of Palmerston North Grant Smith, Mayor of Central Otago Tim Cadogan, Mayor of Wellington Tory Whanau and Mayor of Dunedin Jules Radich issued a joint letter criticising the proposed law change requiring referendums on having Māori wards and constituencies, describing it as "an overreach on local decision-making." In response, Brown along with New Zealand First leader Winston Peters and ACT Party David Seymour defended the proposed legislation as a restoration of democracy and said that New Zealanders had voted for change during the 2023 New Zealand general election.

On 30 July 2024, Parliament passed the Local Government (Electoral Legislation and Māori Wards and Māori Constituencies) Amendment Act 2024, which "restored the right of local referendum on the establishment or ongoing use of Māori wards." While National, ACT and NZ First supported the bill as part of their coalition agreements, it was opposed by the Labour, Green, and Māori parties. During the third reading, the Brown said that the Government was supporting local democracy by giving local communities the right to decide whether to establish Māori wards in their communities. By contrast, Labour leader Chris Hipkins accused the Government of discriminating against Māori and promoting division. Similarly, Te Pāti Māori MP Mariameno Kapa-Kingi described the law change as an attack on the Treaty of Waitangi and an attempt to silence Māori.

Under the law change the 45 local councils that had established Māori wards following the 2021 law change abolishing binding referendums on Māori wards were required to decide by 6 September 2024 whether to drop their Māori wards or hold a binding poll on them at the 2025 local elections. If councils chose to keep their Māori wards, they would have to fund the referendums themselves. By the deadline of 6 September, all local councils with Māori wards except the Kaipara District Council and Upper Hutt City Council had voted to retain their Māori wards subject to binding polls. The Kaipara District Council voted to disestablish its Māori ward, which had been introduced during the 2022 New Zealand local elections, without holding a binding poll, with councillor Pera Paniora continuing as Māori ward councillor until 2025. The Kaipara Council's disestablishment of its Māori ward was subject of a legal challenge in the Auckland High Court mounted by Ngāti Whātua. Meanwhile, the Upper Hutt Council rescinded its 2023 decision to establish at least one Māori ward for the 2025 and 2028 local elections.

Several councils including the Palmerston North City Council (PNCC), Whakatāne, Ruapehu, South Taranaki, Gisborne and Far North District Councils also endorsed motions to explore legal options to avoid holding binding polls on their Māori wards. During the annual LGNZ conference held on 21 August 2024, the PNCC and Far North District Council submitted a remit challenging the Government's poll requirement for Māori wards. In addition, the Northland Regional Council introduced a remit calling for a 75% majority vote for any changes to the Local Election Act affecting Māori wards. According to the Otago Daily Times, 83.5% of local councils at the LGNZ conference supported the remit opposing the poll requirement for Māori wards and constituencies. In response, Brown defended the Government's Māori ward polls requirement.

During the 2025 New Zealand local referendums on Māori wards and constituencies held on 11 October, 24 district and regional councils voted to disestablish their Māori wards and constituencies while 18 others vote to retain them.

In late October 2026, the Tauranga City Council confirmed that it would hold a binding referendum on whether to retain its Te Awanui Māori ward on 23 March 2027.

== Councils with Māori wards or constituencies ==
Map of local and regional councils with Māori wards following the 2024 law change

=== Territorial authorities ===
Name	Has Māori wards	First election	Referendums	Context
Far North District Council	Yes	2022	2025:Keep	
Whangārei District Council	Yes	2022	2025:Remove	Māori wards will be disestablished from 2028 and bind to 2031 election.
Kaipara District Council	No	2022		Disestablished in 2024 prior to poll.
Auckland Council	No			
Thames-Coromandel District Council	Yes	2025	2025:Remove	Māori wards will be disestablished from 2028 and bind to 2031 election.
Hauraki District Council	Yes	2025	2025:Remove	Māori wards will be disestablished from 2028 and bind to 2031 election.
Waikato District Council	Yes	2022	2025:Remove	Māori wards will be disestablished from 2028 and bind to 2031 election.
Matamata-Piako District Council	Yes	2022	2025:Remove	Māori wards will be disestablished from 2028 and bind to 2031 election.
Hamilton City Council	Yes	2022	2025:Keep	
Waipā District Council	Yes	2022	2025:Remove	Māori wards will be disestablished from 2028 and bind to 2031 election.
Ōtorohanga District Council	Yes	2022	2025:Remove	Māori wards will be disestablished from 2028 and bind to 2031 election.
South Waikato District Council	No			
Waitomo District Council	No			
Taupō District Council	Yes	2022	2025:Remove	Māori wards will be disestablished from 2028 and bind to 2031 election.
Western Bay of Plenty District Council	Yes	2025	2018: 21%/78% 2025:Remove	Māori wards will be disestablished from 2028 and bind to 2031 election.
Tauranga City Council	Yes	2022		Referendum must be held by 2027.
Rotorua Lakes Council	Yes	2022	2025:Keep	
Whakatāne District Council	Yes	2022	2018: 44%/55% 2025:Keep	
Kawerau District Council	Yes	2025	2025:Keep	
Ōpōtiki District Council	Yes	2025	2022: 50.2%/49.8% (non-binding)	
Gisborne District Council	Yes	2022	2025:Keep	
Wairoa District Council	Yes	2019	2016: 54%/46%	
Hastings District Council	Yes	2022	2025:Remove	Māori wards will be disestablished from 2028 and bind to 2031 election.
Napier City Council	Yes	2025	2025:Remove	Māori wards will be disestablished from 2028 and bind to 2031 election.
Central Hawke's Bay District Council	Yes	2025	2025:Remove	Māori wards will be disestablished from 2028 and bind to 2031 election.
New Plymouth District Council	Yes	2022	2015: 17%/83% 2025:Remove	Māori wards will be disestablished from 2028 and bind to 2031 election.
Stratford District Council	Yes	2022	2025:Remove	Māori wards will be disestablished from 2028 and bind to 2031 election.
South Taranaki District Council	Yes	2022	2025:Remove	Māori wards will be disestablished from 2028 and bind to 2031 election.
Ruapehu District Council	Yes	2022	2025:Keep	
Whanganui District Council	Yes	2025	2025:Keep	
Rangitikei District Council	Yes	2022	2025:Remove	Māori wards will be disestablished from 2028 and bind to 2031 election.
Manawatū District Council	Yes	2022	2018: 22%/78% 2025:Remove	Māori wards will be disestablished from 2028 and bind to 2031 election.
Palmerston North City Council	Yes	2022	2018: 32%/68% 2025:Keep	
Tararua District Council	Yes	2022	2025:Remove	Māori wards will be disestablished from 2028 and bind to 2031 election.
Horowhenua District Council	Yes	2022	2025:Remove	Māori wards will be disestablished from 2028 and bind to 2031 election.
Kāpiti Coast District Council	Yes	2025	2025:Keep (progress result)	
Porirua City Council	Yes	2022	2025:Keep	
Upper Hutt City Council	No			Approved in 2023, rescinded in 2024 before any election.
Hutt City Council	Yes	2025	2025:Keep	
Wellington City Council	Yes	2022	2025:Keep	
Masterton District Council	Yes	2022	2025:Keep	
Carterton District Council	No			
South Wairarapa District Council	Yes	2025	2025:Keep	
Tasman District Council	Yes	2025	2025:Remove	Māori wards will be disestablished from 2028 and bind to 2031 election.
Nelson City Council	Yes	2022	2025:Keep	
Marlborough District Council	Yes	2022	2025:Remove	Māori wards will be disestablished from 2028 and bind to 2031 election.
Buller District Council	No			
Grey District Council	No			
Westland District Council	No			
Kaikōura District Council	No		2018: 20%/80%	
Hurunui District Council	No			
Waimakariri District Council	No			
Christchurch City Council	No			
Selwyn District Council	No			
Ashburton District Council	No			
Timaru District Council	No			
Mackenzie District Council	No			
Waimate District Council	No			
Chatham Islands Council	No			
Waitaki District Council	No			
Central Otago District Council	No			
Queenstown-Lakes District Council	No			
Dunedin City Council	No			
Clutha District Council	No			
Southland District Council	No			
Gore District Council	No			
Invercargill City Council	No			

=== Regional councils ===
Note: this table excludes the unitary authorities in Auckland, Gisborne, Nelson, Tasman and Marlborough.

Regional council	Has Māori constituencies?	First election	Referendums	Context
Northland Regional Council	Yes	2022	2025:Remove	Māori constituencies will be disestablished from 2028 and bind to 2031 election.
Waikato Regional Council	Yes	2013	2011: Not demanded	
Bay of Plenty Regional Council	Yes	2004	2001: Not required	
Hawke's Bay Regional Council	Yes	2022	2025:Remove	Māori wards will be disestablished from 2028 and bind to 2031 election.
Taranaki Regional Council	Yes	2022	2025:Remove	Māori wards will be disestablished from 2028 and bind to 2031 election.
Horizons Regional Council	Yes	2022	2025:Keep	
Greater Wellington Regional Council	Yes	2025	2025:Keep	
West Coast Regional Council	No			Representation for the Ngāi Tahu iwi is affirmed through local legislation.
Environment Canterbury	No			
Otago Regional Council	No			
Southland Regional Council	No			

== Public opinion ==
In mid June 2024, a New Zealand Taxpayers' Union–Curia poll found that a majority of New Zealanders (58%) believed that local voters rather than local mayors and councillors should decide on the introduction or disestablishment of Māori wards. By contrast, 23% believed that the decision should be left to local mayors and councillors while 19% were undecided.

== See also ==
- 2025 New Zealand local referendums on Māori wards and constituencies
