= Moana Theodore =

New Zealand epidemiologist

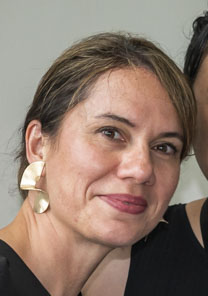
- Theodore in 2020
- Born: Auckland, New Zealand
- Education: University of Auckland
- Known for: Longitudinal research
- Scientific career
- Fields: Epidemiology
- Workplaces: University of Otago; Institute of Psychiatry, King's College London; National Centre for Lifecourse Research

Reremoana Farquharson Theodore is a New Zealand epidemiologist and Professor specialising in longitudinal research. She is the director of the Dunedin Multidisciplinary Health and Development Study and was director of the University of Otago's National Centre for Lifecourse Research in Dunedin.

== Early life and education ==
Theodore is of Ngāpuhi descent, and she grew up in Auckland and attended Papatoetoe High School. She studied psychology at the University of Otago. Her work in epidemiology began with being interviewer on the longitudinal Dunedin Study in 1998, and she then worked on further lifecourse research at the Institute of Psychiatry, King's College London.

== PhD and research career ==
Theodore gained her PhD from the University of Auckland in 2008.

Theodore was awarded a Health Research Council of New Zealand (HRC) Erihapeti Rehu-Murchie Postdoctoral Fellowship, and was one of two researchers awarded Māori Health Research Emerging Leader Fellowships by the HRC in 2018.

== Organisational affiliations ==
Theodore served on the Council of New Zealand's academy of sciences, the Royal Society Te Apārangi, from 2018 to 2021. She was a ministerial appointment to the Southern District Health Board from 2019 to 2022.
