= Andrew Judd =

New Zealand politician (born 1965)

26th Mayor of New Plymouth
- In office 26 October 2013 – 25 October 2016
- Deputy: Heather Dodunski
- Preceded by: Harry Duynhoven
- Succeeded by: Neil Holdom
- Majority: 9,206

Councillor for New Plymouth District
- In office 2007–2013

Personal details
- Born: Andrew Mark Judd; 1965 (age 60–61) Masterton, New Zealand
- Party: Māori Party (2016)
- Occupation: Dispensing optician

Andrew Mark Judd (born 1965) is a New Zealand local government politician and activist who served as the mayor of New Plymouth from 2013 to 2016.

== Early life ==
Judd was born in Masterton in 1965, the second of six children of Peter and Jennifer Judd. His father ran a menswear shop and his mother had come to New Zealand from Guernsey as a 16-year-old. Judd was educated at Makoura College.

== Career ==
After leaving school Judd had a varied work history as a cloth-cutter in clothing factories, stock and station sales management cadet, home appliance retailer, and sales rep for The Radio Network, then he became a dispensing optician in New Plymouth.

=== Politics ===
At the 2007 local-body elections, Judd was elected to the New Plymouth District Council as the second-highest polling candidate. He was re-elected in 2010, polling in fourth place.

Judd won the mayoralty of New Plymouth from one-term incumbent Harry Duynhoven with a 9,206 vote majority in 2013 and served one term before announcing he would not stand again in 2016.

=== Māori wards ===
In 2014 Judd caused controversy when he and his council supported the establishment of a Māori ward in New Plymouth in a move intended to increase Māori representation, lift iwi participation in council decision-making and fulfil Treaty of Waitangi obligations. Judd also called for all councils in New Zealand to have up to 50% Māori representation. The proposals were widely criticised by politicians and the media, with New Zealand First leader Winston Peters calling arguments for the ward "childish nonsense" and right-wing media personality Mike Hosking labelling Judd "completely out of touch with middle New Zealand". In the months following, a publicly initiated referendum on the creation of a Māori ward, which Judd lost in a landslide, the mayor spoke to media about "a man in a Nazi uniform" coming to see him, getting removed as a patron of a club, being abused walking down the street in a Santa parade and being spat on whilst out with family at a local supermarket. Judd, a New Zealand European, labels himself a "recovering racist".

However, Judd gained the admiration and recognition of political figures, including MP Marama Fox who called for his critics to apologise in a general debate speech before parliament. Support for Judd also flowed on social media, with a Facebook group named "Andrew Judd Fan Club" reaching 10,500 members.

Subsequently, in the region of Taranaki in 2020 the South Taranaki District Council, the New Plymouth District Council voted to establish a ward, in 2021, the Taranaki Regional Council and the Stratford District Council also voted in favour of a Māori ward. Judd spoke out against the National-led Government in 2024 changing a law from the previous Government which will force referendum on many councils in 2025. He said: "It’s taking us backwards" Judd has stated that it was the public backlash that led him to decide not to stand for re-election in 2016.

=== Spokesperson ===
Judd spends time fighting racism in New Zealand through speaking appearances, opinion pieces and other means. In 2024 he was one of 17 Pākehā profiled in the book Leave your big boots at the door: Pākehā confronting racism against Māori by Lorraine McLeod.

I’m Tangata Tiriti, I have a place to stand in Aotearoa thanks to the welcome offered by Tangata Whenua in 1840, yet I’d lived my entire life as though I’d just arrived from England.
