= Whakatāne District Council =

Coordinates: 37.952658°S 176.995674°E

Whakatāne District Council Kia Whakatāne au i ahau

Type
- Type: Unicameral of District
- Houses: Governing Body
- Term limits: None

History
- Founded: 6 March 1989

Leadership
- Mayor: Nándor Tánczos

Structure
- Seats: 11 seats (1 mayor, 10 ward seats)
- Length of term: 3 years

Website
- whakatane.govt.nz

Whakatāne District Council or Whakatane District Council (Māori: Kia Whakatāne au i ahau) is the territorial authority for the Whakatāne District of New Zealand.

The council is led by the mayor of Whakatāne, who is currently Nándor Tánczos. There are also 10 ward councillors.

== Composition ==
=== 2025–2028 elected members ===
Type	Ward	Councillor	Affiliation
Mayor	At-Large	Nándor Tánczos	None
General	Rangitāiki	Gavin Dennis	None
General	Rangitāiki	Henry Heke	None
General	Whakatāne-Ōhope	Carolyn Louise Hamill	None
General	Whakatāne-Ōhope	Lesley Immink	None
General	Whakatāne-Ōhope	Julie Claire Jukes	None
General	Whakatāne-Ōhope	Malcolm Whitaker	None
General	Te Urewera	Andrew Iles	None
Māori	Rangitāiki	Tu O'Brien	None
Māori	Kāpū te rangi	Toni Boynton	None
Māori	Toi ki Uta (Māori)	Jesse Wayne Ranui-Morgan	None

=== 2022–2025 elected members ===
- Victor Luca, Mayor
- Lesley Immink, Deputy Mayor
- Julie Jukes, Councillor for Whakatāne-Ōhope General ward
- Nándor Tánczos, Councillor for Whakatāne-Ōhope General ward
- Andrew Iles, Councillor for Te Urewera General ward
- Gavin Dennis, Councillor for Rangitāiki General ward
- Wilson James, Councillor for Rangitāiki General ward
- John Pullar, Councillor for Whakatāne-Ōhope General ward
- Tu O'Brien, Councillor for Rangitāiki General ward
- Toni Boynton, Councillor for Kapu te rangi Māori Ward
- Ngapera Rangiaho, Councillor for Toi ki Uta Māori Ward

=== 2019–2022 elected members ===
- Judy Turner, Mayor
- Andrew Iles, Deputy Mayor
- Julie Jukes, Councillor for Whakatāne-Ōhope ward
- Alison Silcock, Councillor for Galatea-Murupara ward
- Nándor Tánczos, Councillor for Whakatāne-Ōhope ward
- Gerard van Beek, Councillor for Rangitāiki ward
- Victor Luca, Councillor for Whakatāne-Ōhope ward
- Gavin Dennis, Councillor for Rangitāiki Ward
- Wilson James, Councillor for Rangitāiki ward
- Lesley Immink, Councillor for Whakatāne-Ōhope ward
- John Pullar, Councillor for Whakatāne-Ōhope ward
