= Local Electoral Act 2001 =

Act of Parliament in New Zealand

New Zealand Parliament
- Assented to: 29 May 2001
- Commenced: 1 July 2001
- Administered by: Department of Internal Affairs

Legislative history
- Introduced by: Sandra Lee-Vercoe
- First reading: 13 December 2000
- Second reading: 15 May 2001
- Committee of the whole: 17, 22, 23 May 2001
- Third reading: 23 May 2001

Related legislation
- Local Government Act 2002; Electoral Act 1993
- Status: In force

The Local Electoral Act 2001 is an act of the New Zealand Parliament that provides for the regulation of local government elections in New Zealand.

The purpose of the Act is to provide for modern, flexible local electoral law. The Act sets uniform rules in relation to significant components of the local government electoral system while allowing for individual local authorities (territorial authorities and regional councils) to determine other matters. The Act is administered by the Department of Internal Affairs and the responsible minister is the Minister of Local Government.

== History ==
The previous legislation governing local election conduct was the former Local Elections and Polls Act 1976. Since that legislation was passed, local government had been significantly reorganised, wards (geographic electoral subdivisions) had been introduced, and councils had started using postal voting. Policy for the new legislation was developed by a local government sector working group on behalf of the Department of Internal Affairs. The working group published discussion document in 1999 ("The Electoral Way Forward") and a position paper in 2000 ("A New Legislative Framework for Local Government Elections"). Draft legislation was developed alongside the final position paper and offered to the Minister of Local Government, Sandra Lee-Vercoe.

The Local Electoral Bill was introduced by the minister on 13 December 2000. After consideration by a select committee the bill was passed the following May in a 71–49 vote. Labour, the Alliance, the Green Party and New Zealand First voted in favour; National, ACT New Zealand and United New Zealand voted against. The bill's passage was expedited because the next local elections were scheduled for October 2001.

Prior to the introduction of the Local Electoral Bill, the New Zealand Parliament had been considering a private member's bill on the single transferable vote (STV) electoral system in the name of Rod Donald. That bill proposed local authorities to have the option of adopting STV rather than the traditional first-past-the-post electoral system. Parliament agreed to incorporate the STV option into the Local Electoral Act 2001.

== Provisions ==
=== Māori wards and constituencies ===
A 2002 amendment to the Act introduced the option for territorial authorities to establish Māori wards and regional councils to establish Māori constituencies. These constituencies are similar to the Māori electorates established under the Electoral Act 1993, but on a local government level. Electors who are registered on the Māori electoral roll would vote in a Māori ward or Māori constituency, if one has been established at their territorial authority or regional council. The Bay of Plenty Regional Council (Māori Constituencies Enabling) Act 2001 had previously created Māori constituencies at the Bay of Plenty Regional Council.

The Act provides that if a territorial authority or regional council agrees to create a new Māori ward or Māori constituency, electors may petition the council to hold a referendum that could disallow the new ward or constituency. The threshold of 5% of electors must be reached for the petition to be valid. Between 2002 and 2021, 24 different local authorities attempted to establish Māori wards, however, only 2 of the 24 councils were ever successful. These "poll provisions" were briefly removed by the Sixth Labour Government in 2021 (leading to 35 local authorities electing Māori ward councillors in 2022) before being reinstated by the Sixth National Government in 2024. As part of this policy reversal, territorial authorities and regional councils that had already established a Māori ward or constituency without a referendum were required to disestablish them or hold a binding poll alongside the 2025 New Zealand local elections.

== Proposed amendments ==
=== Online voting ===
Between 2013 and 2019, amendments were considered to develop an online voting system for New Zealand local elections. A group of councils including Auckland Council, Gisborne District Council, Hamilton City Council, Marlborough District Council, Matamata-Piako District Council, Palmerston North City Council, Selwyn District Council, Tauranga City Council and Wellington City Council prepared to trial online voting in each of the 2016 and 2019 local elections. In 2016, the responsible minister Louise Upston cancelled the trial because she was not satisfied the trial requirements could be met. Draft regulations were released for consultation in 2018 but a further trial was cancelled when councils withdrew due to funding unavailability. The heads of New Zealand's intelligence agencies have warned against online voting due to security concerns and the risk of foreign interference.

=== Voting age ===
On 20 October 2022, the draft report of the Future for Local Government Review recommended that the voting age for local elections be lowered to 16 and extend local government terms from 3 years to 4 years.

On 21 November 2022, the Supreme Court of New Zealand ruled in Make It 16 Incorporated v Attorney-General that the voting age of 18 years was inconsistent with the right to be free from discrimination under section 19 of the Bill of Rights Act 1990 and that they had not been justified. The day after, Prime Minister Jacinda Ardern and Deputy Prime Minister Grant Robertson confirmed that the Labour Party ministers were considering whether to amend the Local Electoral Act to allow 16-year-olds to vote in local body elections. Labour's local government minister Kieran McAnulty introduced a bill to that effect in August 2023, but after the October 2023 general election the new government withdrew the legislation.

== See also ==
- Local elections in New Zealand
- Local government in New Zealand
- Voting in New Zealand
