= Kenneth Wang =

Kenneth Wang may refer to:

- Kenneth Wang (politician) (born 1955), former member of the ACT New Zealand party
- Kenneth Wang (psychologist) (born 1972), Taiwanese American psychologist
