= Leader of ACT New Zealand =

Leaders of a New Zealand libertarian party

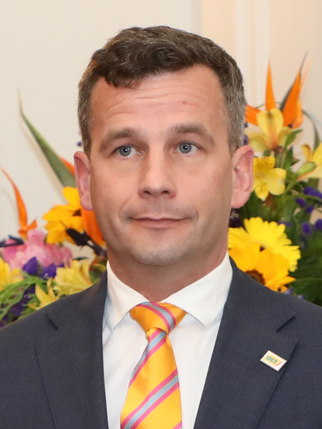
- Incumbent; David Seymour since 4 October 2014
- Type: Party leader
- Formation: 1994
- First holder: Roger Douglas
- Deputy: Deputy Leader of ACT New Zealand
- Website: https://www.act.org.nz

The leader of ACT New Zealand is the highest-ranked political position within ACT New Zealand. The current leader is David Seymour, who became the leader in October 2014. He is the longest serving ACT Leader, serving more than 12 years as of 2026.

The leader is appointed by the party board. The leader is not required to be a member of parliament; when the leader is a member of parliament, the party constitution states that the leader is responsible for "the supervision, co-ordination and conduct of the Party’s activities in Parliament." The leader serves until they resign or the board removes them.

The party leader and deputy party leader are ex officio members of the ACT board. The board consists of a maximum of thirteen members, consisting of regional representatives, party MPs, the party president, party vice-president, the party treasurer, and others at the discretion of the board.

== List of leaders ==
No.	Leader	Portrait	Electorate	List placement (Note: List placement sources)		Term start	Term end
1	Roger Douglas (b. 1937)		None (was previously a Labour MP; re-elected as the third-ranked ACT list MP in the 2008 election, after leadership term)			1994	24 March 1996
2	Richard Prebble (b. 1948)		Wellington Central	1st	1996–1999	26 March 1996	13 June 2004
2	Richard Prebble (b. 1948)		List	1st	1999–2005	26 March 1996	13 June 2004
3	Rodney Hide (b. 1956)		List	7th	1996–1999	13 June 2004	28 April 2011
3	Rodney Hide (b. 1956)		List	5th	1999–2002	13 June 2004	28 April 2011
3	Rodney Hide (b. 1956)		List	2nd	2002–2005	13 June 2004	28 April 2011
3	Rodney Hide (b. 1956)		Epsom	1st	2005–2010	13 June 2004	28 April 2011
4	Don Brash (b. 1940)		None (was previously leader of National; was first on the ACT party list for the 2011 election but ACT did not gain enough party votes)			28 April 2011	26 November 2011
5	John Banks (b. 1946)		Epsom	4th	2011–2014	15 February 2012	2 February 2014
6	Jamie Whyte (b. 1965/1966)		None (was first on party list for the 2014 election but ACT did not gain enough party votes)			2 February 2014	3 October 2014
7	David Seymour (b. 1983)		Epsom	None	2014–2017	4 October 2014	incumbent
7	David Seymour (b. 1983)		Epsom	1st	2017–present	4 October 2014	incumbent

== Deputy leader ==
Deputy leader
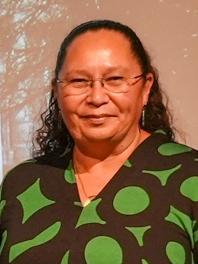
- Incumbent; Nicole McKee since 28 June 2026

The party also has a deputy leader who acts as leader when required in the leaders absence. The current leader is Nicole McKee.

No.	Deputy leader	Portrait	Electorate	List placement		Term start	Term end	Leader
1	Ken Shirley (b. 1950)		List	3rd	1996–1999	1994	2004	Douglas
1	Ken Shirley (b. 1950)		List	2nd	1999–2002	1994	2004	Prebble
1	Ken Shirley (b. 1950)		List	7th	2002–2005	1994	2004	Prebble
1	Ken Shirley (b. 1950)		None (was sixth on party list for the 2005 election but ACT did not gain enough party votes)			1994	2004	Prebble
2	Muriel Newman (b. 1950)		List	8th	1996–1999	2004	2005	Hide
2	Muriel Newman (b. 1950)		List	7th	1999–2002	2004	2005	Hide
2	Muriel Newman (b. 1950)		List	3rd	2002–2005	2004	2005	Hide
2	Muriel Newman (b. 1950)		None (was third on party list for the 2005 election but ACT did not gain enough party votes)			2004	2005	Hide
3	Heather Roy (b. 1964)		None (was tenth on party list for the 1999 election but ACT did not gain enough party votes)			17 September 2005	17 August 2010	Hide
3	Heather Roy (b. 1964)		List	9th	2002–2005	17 September 2005	17 August 2010	Hide
3	Heather Roy (b. 1964)		List	2nd	2005–2008	17 September 2005	17 August 2010	Hide
3	Heather Roy (b. 1964)		List	2nd	2008–2011	17 September 2005	17 August 2010	Hide
4	John Boscawen (b. 1956)		List	4th	2008–2011	17 August 2010	c. November 2012	Hide
4	John Boscawen (b. 1956)		List	4th	2008–2011	17 August 2010	c. November 2012	Brash
5	Kenneth Wang (b. 1955)		None (was tenth on party list for the 2002 election but ACT did not gain enough party votes)			15 April 2014	9 July 2017	Whyte
5	Kenneth Wang (b. 1955)		List	10th	2004–2005	15 April 2014	9 July 2017	Seymour
5	Kenneth Wang (b. 1955)		None (was seventh on party list for the 2005 election, and second on party list for the 2014 election but ACT did not gain enough party votes)			15 April 2014	9 July 2017	Seymour
6	Beth Houlbrooke (b. ?)		None (was fourth on party list for the 2014 election, second on party list for the 2017 election, and twelfth on party list for the 2020 election but ACT did not gain enough party votes)			9 July 2017	28 June 2020	Seymour
7	Brooke van Velden (b. 1992)		None (was third on party list for the 2017 election but ACT did not gain enough party votes)			28 June 2020	28 June 2026	Seymour
7	Brooke van Velden (b. 1992)		Tāmaki	2nd	2020–2026	28 June 2020	28 June 2026	Seymour
8	Nicole McKee (b. 1971 or 1972)		List	3rd	2020–2026	28 June 2026	incumbent	Seymour
8	Nicole McKee (b. 1971 or 1972)		List	2nd	2026–present	28 June 2026	incumbent	Seymour

== See also ==
- Leader of the New Zealand National Party
- Leader of the New Zealand Labour Party
- Co-leaders of the Green Party of Aotearoa New Zealand
- Co-leaders of Te Pāti Māori
- Libertarianism

== Sources ==
- "ACT New Zealand – Constitution & Rules" (PDF), 2019. Elections NZ. ACT New Zealand. Retrieved 15 March 2024
