= Quote of the Year =

Annual New Zealand vote run by Massey University

Quote of the Year is an annual New Zealand vote run by Massey University. A vote is held to determine best quote in New Zealand for the year.

== Timeline ==
=== 2025 ===
==== Winner ====
Announced on 18 December, the quote from The Post National Affairs Editor Andrea Vance, was awarded the winner of the 2025 competition following a public vote.

==== Finalists ====
The 10 finalists selected from public nominations were:

1. "If you are unhappy with it, for God's sake, go make a Marmite sandwich and put an apple in a bag just like you and I had.” — Christopher Luxon
2. "If it walks like a duck, and it quacks like a duck, it's not looking good, is it?” — Judith Collins
3. "They're killing our native birds and not shagging them.” — Matt Bailey
4. "The next goal is to jump 2.40m as that's quite a key height, and also because it'd be kind of cool to be able to jump over a ceiling.” — Hamish Kerr
5. "If we find six of 68 Government MPs with a spine, we can stand on the right side of history.” — Chlöe Swarbrick
6. "I know he's the Prime Minister, I made him the Prime Minister.” — Winston Peters
7. "Thank you so much for believing in Indigenous stories and believing they could be more than just brown people standing on a mountain playing a flute talking to ancestors.” — Taika Waititi
8. "Turns out you can have it all. So long as you're prepared to be a c…t to the women who birth your kids, school your offspring and wipe the arse of your elderly parents while you stand on their shoulders to earn your six-figure, taxpayer-funded pay packet.” — Andrea Vance
9. "Wildlife doesn't have brothers, sisters, fathers and mothers to call the police if something happens.” — Mike Bodie
10. "I will not be setting a precedent that the way to get a meeting with me is to don an adult nappy and chain yourself to a door.” — Nicola Willis

=== 2024 ===
==== Winner ====
Announced on 20 December, the quote from Pepper the Cockatoo "Hello Darling", her catchphrase which she said while at Porirua Police Station, was awarded the winner of the 2024 competition following a public vote.

==== Finalists ====
From 70 nominations, the 10 finalists for Quote of the Year 2024 were:

1. "You've got enough room out there for like three rugby fields" Black Fern Ruby Tui to King Charles referring to the Buckingham Palace Garden.
2. "Let me be clear: I'm wealthy, I'm ‒ you know - sorted." Prime Minister Christopher Luxon discussing the sale of his flat in Wellington.
3. "Hello Darling!" Pepper, a Cockatoo that was stolen (referred to as 'bird-napped' by media) talking to police in Porirua.
4. "Lounging on the couch, eating Maccas and KFC and popping out babies" Portia Woodman on retiring after the Olympics.
5. "What the hell is this? Look what I've been sleeping on the whole time!" Speed climber Julian David looking at his unusual mattress at the Olympic Village.
6. "Was this a difficult case for me? I think it was a difficult case for everyone." Crown solicitor Alysha McClintock to reporters after the not guilty verdict in the Polkinghorne trial.
7. "I hate those symbols and salutes, but I quite like knowing who the idiots in society are." ACT Party leader David Seymour on people using Nazi symbols and salutes.
8. "I felt like he needed the hug more than me." Black Fern Ayesha Leti-I'iga on asking King Charles for a hug.
9. "If he were in New Zealand, he would be called 'Fish and Chip shop-sy." Comedian Jeremy Corbett on the theory that graffiti artist Banksy got his name from spray painting banks.
10. "Kāwana!” (Government); “No, don’t do that.”; “Kāwana, ka whakamanuwhiritia koe e au….” (Government, I ask you...) Te Pāti Māori MP Hana-Rawhiti Maipi-Clarke (speaking Te Reo Maaori) before performing a haka in the House of Representatives and Speaker Gerry Brownlee trying to maintain the order of the house.

According to Dr Rachel Kavan, who leads the Quote of the Year panel, said that they wouldn't usually allow two quotes from the same event, but the Black Ferns meeting the king inspired them to break protocol.

=== 2023 ===
==== Winner ====
"'Nah, we’re just three Māori boys" — Mikey Kihi, Rikki Kihi, and Morehu Maxwell. During Cyclone Gabrielle, these three were rescuing people in a boat, and were asked "Are you guys from the navy?"

==== Finalists ====
The 10 finalists of 2023 were:

1. "I don't listen to rumours. I just start them." — Taika Waititi
2. "I encourage all of you to go out there, have more babies if you wish, that would be helpful." — Christopher Luxon
3. "A B-grade American celebrity coming out and essentially hijacking Bird of the Century. I don’t think he even likes birds." — Erin Reilly of Save the Kiwi (referencing John Oliver campaigning for the puteketeke).
4. "Nah, we’re just three Māori boys." — Mikey Kihi, Rikki Kihi, and Morehu Maxwell (While rescuing trapped people during Cyclone Gabrielle, these three were asked if they were from the navy)
5. "How big is his hole?" — Nicola Willis (asking Grant Robertson in parliament about a fiscal gap)
6. "You can be a mother, or not, an ex-Mormon, or not, a nerd, a crier, a hugger – you can be all of these things, and not only can you be here – you can lead." — Jacinda Ardern (during her farewell speech from her role as prime minister)
7. "There is nobody who fails to be interesting" — Kim Hill (referencing her job interviewing people as a broadcaster)
8. "Up the Wahs!" — Fans of the Warriors.
9. "The issue is rain. We really need that to stop." — Auckland mayor Wayne Brown (as the city went into a state of emergency).
10. "Oh, have you got ID?" — Auckland bar manager (asking Ed Sheeran)

=== 2022 ===
==== Winner ====
"I would have thought that Grant Robertson would be a much bigger threat to lamingtons than lamingtons would be a threat to Grant Robertson" — David Seymour

==== Finalists ====
The 10 finalists of 2022 were:

- "They said nobody cared about women’s rugby. Well guess what? We are here! We are here, fam !" — Ruby Tui
- "If only we cared as much about the local elections as we do for Bird of the Year." — Nicola Toki (talking about rigging attempts)
- "Fundamentally, I'm interested in being a good person with as minimal inconvenience as possible." — Alice Snedden
- "I would have thought that Grant Robertson would be a much bigger threat to lamingtons than lamingtons would be a threat to Grant Robertson." — David Seymour
- "Do you know how bad that sounds? Mike King’s women's alliance!" — Shimpal Lelisi (on Celebrity Treasure Island)
- "I wonder whether or not anyone ever asked Barack Obama and John Key if they met because they were of similar age." — Jacinda Ardern (after asked if she met Finnish Prime Minister Sanna Marin due to their similar age)
- "I was born to disrupt things." — The Wizard of New Zealand
- "It's okay to follow a few cockwombles. It doesn't mean I endorse them." — Hilary Barry (after being warned about the people she follows on Twitter)
- "He is delusional, but he’s not suicidal." — Professor Robert Patman (referencing Vladimir Putin's nuclear threat)
- "There are going to be a lot more people in a supermarket on a weekly basis than there will be out and about pashing on a dance floor." — COVID-19 Minister Chris Hipkins (referencing mask wearing)

=== 2021 ===
==== Winner ====
"[It is a] challenge for people in high-density areas to get outside and spread their legs when they are surrounded by other people" — COVID-19 Minister Chris Hipkins

==== Finalists ====
The 10 finalists of 2021 were:

- "It is a challenge in high-density areas for people to get outside and spread their legs." — Covid-19 response minister Chris Hipkins
- "He is about as exciting as the Taihape public toilets." — Mike Williams (referencing Christopher Luxon)
- "It was like a half-sucked Oddfellow in the sky." — Mark Richardson (referencing a blood moon lunar eclipse)
- "If I can't be cured, I'll be the cure." — Jemima Gazley (explaining why she crowd-funded research to the cancer she had)
- "That was a bed-time fail." — Jacinda Ardern (after she gets interrupted by her daughter on Facebook live)
- "We've got an economy that's running on a sugar hit." — David Seymour
- "Does anyone know if the tinny house in Aro will be open during level 4?" — person on a Facebook post
- "Who is going to do a Berocca in the morning?" — Anna Lorck
- "Hey Judith, it's not that bad. Raise an eyebrow, to show you're glad." — Jono and Ben (in a song to Judith Collins)
- "No, it's a f***ing goat." — Toddler

=== 2020 ===
==== Winner ====
"Let it be known these tears are not for you" by Sara Qasem, whose father was murdered in the Christchurch mosque shootings. She received 26.5% of the 2479 votes.

==== Finalists ====
The 2020 year was the first year with a quote from a bird, and a quote of a group of people (New Zealanders as a whole). Many of the quotes were influenced by the COVID-19 pandemic.

The 10 finalists of 2020 were:

- "Because we can't get on each other's nerves if we're dancing constantly." — Buchanan family (in their video COVID-19 lockdown music video)
- "When my eyebrow goes up, it's a joke." — Judith Collins
- "I am the orange face you can trust." — Orange-fronted parakeet (campaigning in the Bird of the Year competition)
- "There are no new cases of Covid-19 to report in New Zealand today." — Ashley Bloomfield (during press many press conferences)
- "The Aussies can have Russell Crowe, but they can't have our buzzy bee." — Simon Beattie (after The Crown placed buzzy bee in scene in Australia)
- "Let it be known these tears are not for you." — Sara Qasem (in her victim impact statement talking to the Christchurch mosque shootings perpetrator)
- "I did a little dance." — Prime Minister Jacinda Ardern (describing how she reacted when the country reached zero active COVID-19 cases)
- "You're on mute" — New Zealanders during Zoom meetings.
- "Put your jazz cabbage away people." — Hilary Barry (talking about the cannabis referendum which voted against legalisation).
- "It really highlights how three-ply soft we've become as a species." — Psychology professor Marc Wilson (referencing toilet paper stockpiling during the lockdowns)

== See also ==
- Bird of the Year
