= Jeremy Corbett =

New Zealand comedian

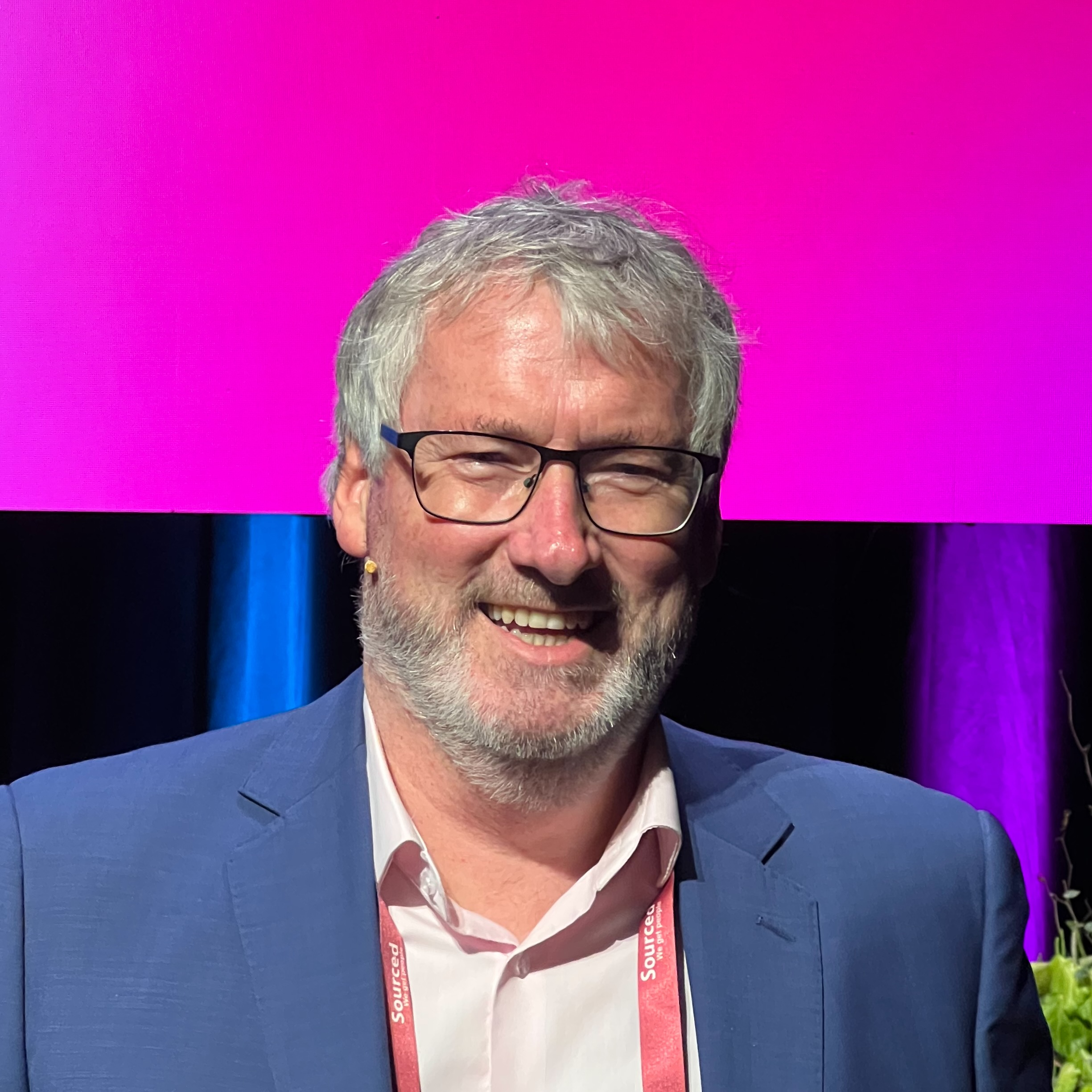
- Corbett in 2024
- Born: 1962 (age 63–64); Westport, New Zealand
- Notable work: 7 Days; The Project
- Spouse: Megan Corbett

Comedy career
- Years active: 1993–present
- Corbett's voice recorded September 2024

Jeremy Corbett (born 1962 in Westport, New Zealand) is a radio and television host and comedian from New Zealand.

== Biography ==
Corbett was born in 1962 to Ashwin and Barbara Corbett. He was born in Westport and grew up in Palmerston North. He also lived in Perth, Australia in the late 1980s working as a programmer for the mines department.

Corbett was a presenter on Radio Massey during the early 1980s. Corbett is the former breakfast co-host for More FM's Auckland broadcast, a position he held since 1993, finishing in November 2011. On television, he appeared on Pulp Comedy and hosted the New Zealand edition of Deal or No Deal. He has hosted the comedy game show 7 Days since 2009, and appeared on The Project on Three before its cancellation. He is a well-known New Zealand comedian and has appeared at numerous comedy festivals.

In 2012, Corbett appeared in the Wellington-set comedy film Edwin: My Life as a Koont.

Corbett is married to Megan Corbett. They have two daughters, Charlie and Billie.

Corbett was nominated for Massey University's Quote of the Year in 2024 for saying "If he were in New Zealand, he would be called 'Fish and Chip shop-sy." in relation to the rumour that graffiti artist Banksy got his name from spray painting banks.

== Awards ==
In October 2018, he was presented with the Reilly Comedy Award from the Variety Artists Club of New Zealand.

== Bibliography ==
- Corbett, Jeremy (24 July 2013). Which Way Up?: The Bloke's Guide to Your New Human. Penguin. ISBN 9781742539171.
