= 2020 New Zealand euthanasia referendum =

Binding referendum in New Zealand

- 17 October 2020
- Do you support the End of Life Choice Act 2019 coming into force?

Results
Choice	Votes	%
Yes	1,893,290	65.91%
No	979,079	34.09%
Valid votes	2,872,369	98.77%
Invalid or blank votes	35,702	1.23%
Total votes	2,908,071	100.00%
Registered voters/turnout	3,549,564	81.93%
- Results by electorate.

The 2020 New Zealand euthanasia referendum was a binding referendum held in New Zealand on 17 October 2020, on the question of whether to legalise euthanasia via the End of Life Choice Act 2019. The vote was held in conjunction with the 2020 general election, and official results were released on 6 November 2020. It was accepted by New Zealand voters, with 65.1% in support and 33.7% opposed.

The act came into force on 7 November 2021, twelve months after the final vote count was announced. The End of Life Choice Act legalises voluntary euthanasia for those with a terminal illness and less than six months left to live, if confirmed to be eligible by two doctors. New Zealand is the first country to have put euthanasia legalisation to a referendum.

Votes for the End of Life Choice referendum were included on the same ballot as the 2020 cannabis referendum, which sought to legalise recreational cannabis.

== Background ==
Prior to 2021, euthanasia was illegal in New Zealand, with it being illegal to "aid and abet suicide" under section 179 of the Crimes Act 1961.

Two earlier attempts to legalise euthanasia failed to get through the New Zealand Parliament. Hawkes Bay National MP Michael Laws's 1995 Death with Dignity Bill failed with 61 votes against and 29 supporting, and NZ First MP Peter Brown's 2003 Death with Dignity Bill failed in its first reading by 60 votes opposing to 58 supporting.

=== End of Life Choice Bill ===
ACT party MP David Seymour entered the End of Life Choice Bill to the member's bill ballot in October 2015. The bill passed its first reading 76–44 in December 2017 and its second reading 70–50 in June 2019. In the committee of the whole House, support from the New Zealand First party became conditional on a referendum to decide whether the law should come into force. An amendment to require a referendum passed 69–51, and the bill passed its third reading with the same numbers on 13 November. The bill received royal assent on 16 November 2019, becoming the End of Life Choice Act 2019.

== Referendum structure ==
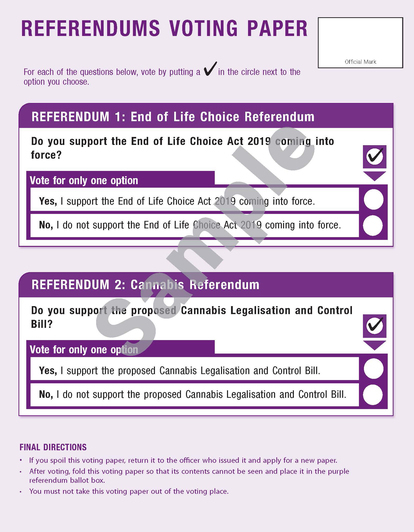
A sample ballot for the 2020 referendums.

Following the third reading, the act was written such that it could only come into force following a majority support at a referendum, which would make the legislation active twelve months after the final vote count. If the majority had opposed the legislation in the referendum (or any subsequent referendum, if the first had been voided), it would have been repealed by 16 November 2024, five years after it received royal assent.

The wording of the referendum was also written into the act, and asked voters:

Do you support the End of Life Choice Act 2019 coming into force?
- Yes, I support the End of Life Choice Act 2019 coming into force.
- No, I do not support the End of Life Choice Act 2019 coming into force.

== Public opinion ==
Support for assisted dying between 2000 and 2019 averaged at around 68%, and prior to the act passing into law in 2019, support for some kind of medically assisted euthanasia for the terminally ill was polled at 74% in April, and 72% in July of 2019.

During the 16-month-long select committee stage of the End of Life Choice Bill, 39,000 public submissions were made, with 90% of submitters opposed to it. Over one thousand doctors signed an open letter in mid-2019 saying that they "want no part in assisted suicide".

Summary of poll results given below. Lines give the mean estimated by a LOESS smoother (smoothing set to span = 0.75).

Through 2020, following the act's assent, public support for it polled at 60–65%:

Date	Polling organisation	Sample size	For	Against	Undecided	Lead
10–14 Oct 2020	1 News Colmar Brunton	1,005	60	33	7	27
17–21 Sep 2020	1 News Colmar Brunton	1,008	64	25	11	39
20–23 Aug 2020	Research New Zealand	1,003	62	24	14	38
9–13 Jul 2020	Research New Zealand	1,012	64	18	18	46
6-8 Mar 2020	Research New Zealand	1,000	60	21	19	39
8–12 Feb 2020	1 News Colmar Brunton	1,004	65	25	9	40
27 Nov – 2 Dec 2019	Research New Zealand	750	70	24	6	48
17–26 Nov 2019	Horizon Research	1,521	70	30	–	40
20–24 Jul 2019	1 News Colmar Brunton	1,003	72	20	7	52
19–29 Apr 2019	Horizon Research	1,341	74	19	7	55

== Campaign rules ==
The rules regarding campaigning for referendums are the same as for general elections. All advertisements must carry a promoter statement, stating the name and physical address of the promoter. It is illegal to campaign on polling day, or within a 10-metre (33 ft) radius of an advance polling booth.

During the regulated period, which ran from 18 August to 16 October 2020, promoters have to declare their campaign expenses and there are limits on how much they may spend on referendum campaigning. The maximum expense limit was $338,000 per referendum for those promoters registered with the Electoral Commission, and $13,600 per referendum for unregistered promoters.

== Results ==
Results of the 2020 euthanasia referendum

Unlike the general election, a preliminary count for the euthanasia referendum was not conducted on election night (17 October 2020). Instead, the referendum votes were counted alongside the mandatory election recount.

All voting papers, counterfoils and electoral rolls are returned to the electorate's returning officer for counting. During the count, the returning officer approves and counts any special votes, (Note: Special votes include votes from those who enrolled after the deadline of 13 September, those who voted outside their electorate (this includes all overseas votes), voters in hospital or prison, and those voters enrolled on the unpublished roll.) and compiles a master electoral roll to ensure no-one has voted more than once. To simplify processing and counting, overseas votes are sent and counted at the Electoral Commission's central processing centre in Wellington, rather than to electorate returning officers.

Preliminary results for the referendums were released by the Electoral Commission on 30 October 2020. These results had 65.2% of people in support of the legislation.

Following the counting of the 480,000 special votes, official results for the general election and referendums were released on 6 November. Based on the final results, 65.1% of people supported the legislation while 33.7% opposed it. Three South Auckland electorates — Māngere, Manurewa and Panmure-Ōtāhuhu — voted against the End of Life Choices Act, perhaps due to conservative evangelical Pasifika Christianity's strength in those areas. By contrast, over three quarters of Auckland Central and Wellington Central voters supported introduction of the End of Life Choices Act in this referendum. Although these are metropolitan electorates, there were several other electorates that polled over seventy percent support for the proposed legislation that were not necessarily urban.

The new legislation took effect on 7 November 2021.

Official results of the New Zealand euthanasia referendum, 17 October 2020
Option	Votes	
Option	Num.	%
Yes	1,893,290	65.91
No	979,079	34.09
Total	2,872,369	100.00
Informal votes	35,702	1.23
Total votes cast	2,908,071	100.00
Registered voters and turnout	3,549,564	82.24

Euthanasia referendum results (excluding invalid votes)
Yes; 1,893,290 (65.9%)	No; 979,079 (34.1%)
▲50%

=== By polling place location ===
As each polling place had only one ballot box for ordinary referendum votes, ordinary votes were broken down by the general electorate where the polling place was located. Special votes were broken down by electorate. Both ordinary and special votes have been combined in the following table.

Electorate	Yes		No		Informal	Turnout
Electorate	Num.	%	Num	%	Informal	Turnout
Auckland Central	28,889	76.88	8,690	23.12	417	
Banks Peninsula	31,660	68.93	14,268	31.07	458	
Bay of Plenty	31,743	69.11	14,186	30.89	401	
Botany	22,417	57.25	16,740	42.75	575	
Christchurch Central	30,899	67.87	14,629	32.13	603	
Christchurch East	32,799	68.84	14,843	31.16	518	
Coromandel	33,745	70.64	14,023	29.36	432	
Dunedin	34,560	68.77	15,694	31.23	505	
East Coast	34,645	65.84	17,972	34.16	710	
East Coast Bays	29,890	68.03	17,972	31.97	416	
Epsom	31,138	70.12	13,267	29.88	485	
Hamilton East	28,862	62.10	17,616	37.90	591	
Hamilton West	29,127	63.22	16,942	36.78	627	
Hutt South	33,503	66.63	16,778	33.37	672	
Ilam	27,562	64.88	14,921	35.12	453	
Invercargill	26,536	63.77	15,076	36.23	404	
Kaikoura	29,961	70.17	12,738	29.83	353	
Kaipara ki Mahurangi	34,951	70.00	14,979	30.00	504	
Kelston	19,078	58.72	13,411	41.28	583	
Mana	25,331	63.87	14,979	36.13	559	
Māngere	11,774	38.37	13,411	61.63	745	
Manurewa	18,677	46.84	21,201	53.16	1,025	
Maungakiekie	24,005	62.68	14,295	37.32	561	
Mount Albert	30,697	71.46	12,260	28.54	561	
Mount Roskill	21,326	55.66	16,990	44.34	779	
Napier	32,530	70.95	13,321	29.05	519	
Nelson	34,240	69.85	14,777	30.15	545	
New Lynn	26,349	64.60	14,438	35.40	672	
New Plymouth	31,526	66.57	15,835	33.43	461	
North Shore	29,637	69.93	12,745	30.07	362	
Northcote	28,002	68.08	13,128	31.92	468	
Northland	34,542	67.25	16,819	32.75	636	
Ōhāriu	27,437	67.70	13,093	32.30	434	
Ōtaki	35,022	68.01	16,477	31.99	573	
Pakuranga	25,091	62.83	14,842	37.17	483	
Palmerston North	25,756	62.58	15,401	37.42	459	
Panmure-Ōtāhuhu	14,868	47.54	16,406	52.46	956	
Papakura	27,050	65.12	14,486	34.88	563	
Port Waikato	28,886	67.71	13,763	32.29	446	
Rangitata	29,775	65.57	15,632	34.43	475	
Rangitīkei	29,312	65.80	15,236	34.20	396	
Remutaka	26,608	64.29	14,781	35.71	511	
Rongotai	29,505	69.92	12,696	30.08	761	
Rotorua	29,376	64.94	15,862	35.06	582	
Selwyn	27,738	69.72	12,046	30.28	284	
Southland	27,664	68.83	12,526	31.17	327	
Taieri	28,688	66.12	14,702	33.88	410	
Takanini	17,251	56.73	13,158	43.27	624	
Tāmaki	28,660	67.52	13,787	32.48	474	
Taranaki-King Country	27,061	67.55	12,998	32.45	370	
Taupō	33,842	68.11	15,842	31.89	453	
Tauranga	33,647	65.59	17,652	34.41	506	
Te Atatū	25,380	58.68	17,872	41.32	695	
Tukituki	30,037	67.18	14,675	32.82	505	
Upper Harbour	23,267	63.94	13,121	36.06	454	
Waikato	24,346	64.77	13,241	35.23	419	
Waimakariri	30,917	68.15	14,450	31.85	388	
Wairarapa	33,290	69.38	14,693	30.62	467	
Waitaki	28,862	68.03	13,566	31.97	401	
Wellington Central	46,187	76.14	14,474	23.86	666	
West Coast-Tasman	28,941	71.36	11,615	28.64	446	
Whanganui	28,749	64.04	16,128	35.94	483	
Whangaparāoa	29,539	68.24	13,747	31.76	304	
Whangārei	34,823	67.85	16,500	32.15	642	
Wigram	28,259	63.90	15,965	36.10	623	
Hauraki-Waikato	3,915	58.71	2,753	41.29	255	
Ikaroa-Rāwhiti	3,390	60.68	2,197	39.32	224	
Tāmaki Makaurau	3,984	58.19	2,862	41.81	240	
Te Tai Hauāuru	3,734	59.93	2,497	40.07	173	
Te Tai Tokerau	3,942	59.15	2,722	40.85	204	
Te Tai Tonga	4,157	67.63	1,990	32.37	185	
Waiariki	3,753	57.63	2,759	42.37	241	
Total	1,893,290	65.91	979,079	34.09	35,702	
