= David Seymour =

New Zealand politician (born 1983)

The Honourable David Seymour MP
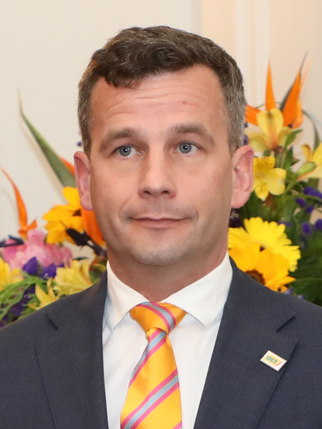
- Seymour in 2023

21st Deputy Prime Minister of New Zealand
- Incumbent
- Assumed office 31 May 2025
- Monarch: Charles III
- Prime Minister: Christopher Luxon
- Governor-General: Cindy Kiro
- Preceded by: Winston Peters

1st Minister for Regulation
- Incumbent
- Assumed office 27 November 2023
- Prime Minister: Christopher Luxon
- Preceded by: Office established

7th Leader of ACT New Zealand
- Incumbent
- Assumed office 3 October 2014
- Deputy: Kenneth Wang; Beth Houlbrooke; Brooke van Velden; Nicole McKee
- Preceded by: Jamie Whyte

Member of the New Zealand Parliament for Epsom
- Incumbent
- Assumed office 20 September 2014
- Preceded by: John Banks
- Majority: 8,142 (20.29%)

Personal details
- Born: David Breen Seymour; 24 June 1983 (age 43) Palmerston North, New Zealand
- Party: ACT
- Domestic partner: Alexandra Vincent Martelli (since 2022, engaged in 2025)
- Education: University of Auckland (BA/BE)
- Occupation: Politician
- Website: Official website
- Seymour's voice on interview with The Platform

David Breen Seymour (born 24 June 1983) is a New Zealand politician who has served as the 21st deputy prime minister of New Zealand since 2025 and as the 1st minister for regulation since 2023. A member of the ACT Party, he has served as its leader and as the member of parliament for Epsom since 2014. Typically classified as a right-libertarian populist, Seymour has liberal views on freedom of choice and economic policy, and conversely majoritarian and reactionary views on New Zealand civic nationalism and indigenous rights.

Seymour spent his early years in Whangārei and joined the ACT Party while studying at the University of Auckland. Following his graduation in 2006, he worked in the engineering industry. Subsequently, he worked for conservative think tanks in Canada during the 2000s, and was linked to the Atlas Network. He stood unsuccessfully for election to the New Zealand House of Representatives in 2005 and 2011, before being elected in 2014 as ACT's sole MP. He then replaced Jamie Whyte as party leader.

Seymour was re-elected in 2017, returning as ACT's sole MP. In 2020, he led ACT to one of its best results in the general election, winning ten seats and retaining his Epsom electorate. He was chiefly responsible for the End of Life Choice Act 2019, which decriminalised euthanasia in New Zealand via referendum in 2020. In the 2023 general election, Seymour was re-elected and the ACT Party increased its representation to 11 seats. This was the best result in the party's history, with the party picking up an extra electorate seat in Tāmaki. ACT subsequently formed a coalition government with the National and New Zealand First parties. Under the coalition arrangement, the position of deputy prime minister was split between Winston Peters and Seymour. Peters served until 31 May 2025, when he was succeeded by Seymour.

Seymour's views on the principles of the Treaty of Waitangi and the ACT Party's Treaty Principles Bill have led to major controversy in New Zealand. He is a strong opponent of co-governance with Māori, and as part of the current government he and ACT have proposed major changes to the principles through reinterpretation of the original Māori text of the Treaty of Waitangi. This includes the removal of any references to "partnership (co-governance)" (between the Crown and Māori) from the treaty's use in law and instead refer to "all New Zealanders". As per the coalition agreement, National and New Zealand First supported the bill to select committee. Ultimately, the bill was voted down on its second reading on 10 April 2025 by a vote of 11–112, with all ACT MPs voting in favour of the bill. Backlash to the proposals led to the Hīkoi mō te Tiriti, which formed one of the largest protests in New Zealand history.

== Early life ==
Seymour was born in Palmerston North on 24 June 1983. His family moved to Whangārei when he was a child. He is descended through his mother's father from a Māori great-great-great-grandmother, Maraea Te Inutoto, whose husband was Stephen Wrathall. Te Inutoto was from Tauwhara marae at Waimate North and a member of the Ngāti Rehia hapū of Ngāpuhi. The family's Māori ancestry was discovered through research by Seymour's great-uncles when he was seven years old. Seymour went to Auckland Grammar School and then the University of Auckland, where he graduated in 2006 with a Bachelor of Engineering (Electrical & Electronic) and a Bachelor of Arts (Philosophy). He then worked in engineering. During the 2000s, Seymour worked for conservative think tanks in Canada for five years as a policy analyst. These think tanks include the Frontier Centre for Public Policy and the Manning Centre. These think tanks are associated with the Atlas Network, which was noted by the former chairperson Debbi Gibbs. Seymour has consistently played down the influence to the organization.

== Early political career ==
New Zealand Parliament
Years	Term	Electorate	List	Party
2014–2017	51st	Epsom	none	ACT
2017–2020	52nd	Epsom	1	ACT
2020–2023	53rd	Epsom	1	ACT
2023–2026	54th	Epsom	1	ACT
2026–present	55th	Epsom	1	ACT

=== ACT activism and candidacy ===
Seymour is a long-time member of ACT. He initially got involved through the student organisation ACT on Campus at Auckland University, of which he was president.

Seymour contested three elections before his eventual success in 2014. He first stood for ACT in 2005 in Mt Albert and was also ranked 37th on the party list. He was unsuccessful in the electorate, which was held by Helen Clark, the prime minister at the time, and with 1.51% of the party vote ACT returned only two members to parliament, leaving Seymour out. While living in Canada, Seymour contested the 2008 election for ACT as a list-only candidate, ranked 55th.

At the 2011 general election, Seymour stood for ACT in the Auckland Central electorate, but the electorate was retained by the National Party's Nikki Kaye. Seymour was ranked fifth on the party list, but with 1.07% of the party vote, ACT was unable to return any list MPs to parliament, and John Banks, who had retained the Epsom seat for ACT, was the party's only sitting member.

=== Path to leadership, 2011–2014 ===
After the 2011 election, Seymour worked as a ministerial adviser for Banks, who was appointed an Associate Minister of Education for the John Key-led National government. Seymour assisted with the development of the government's Partnership Schools legislation. In late 2013, John Banks resigned from his ministerial positions following criminal charges in relation to electoral returns in his bid for the Auckland mayoralty in 2010. In June 2014 he announced he would resign from ACT Party leadership and not contest Epsom in the 2014 election.

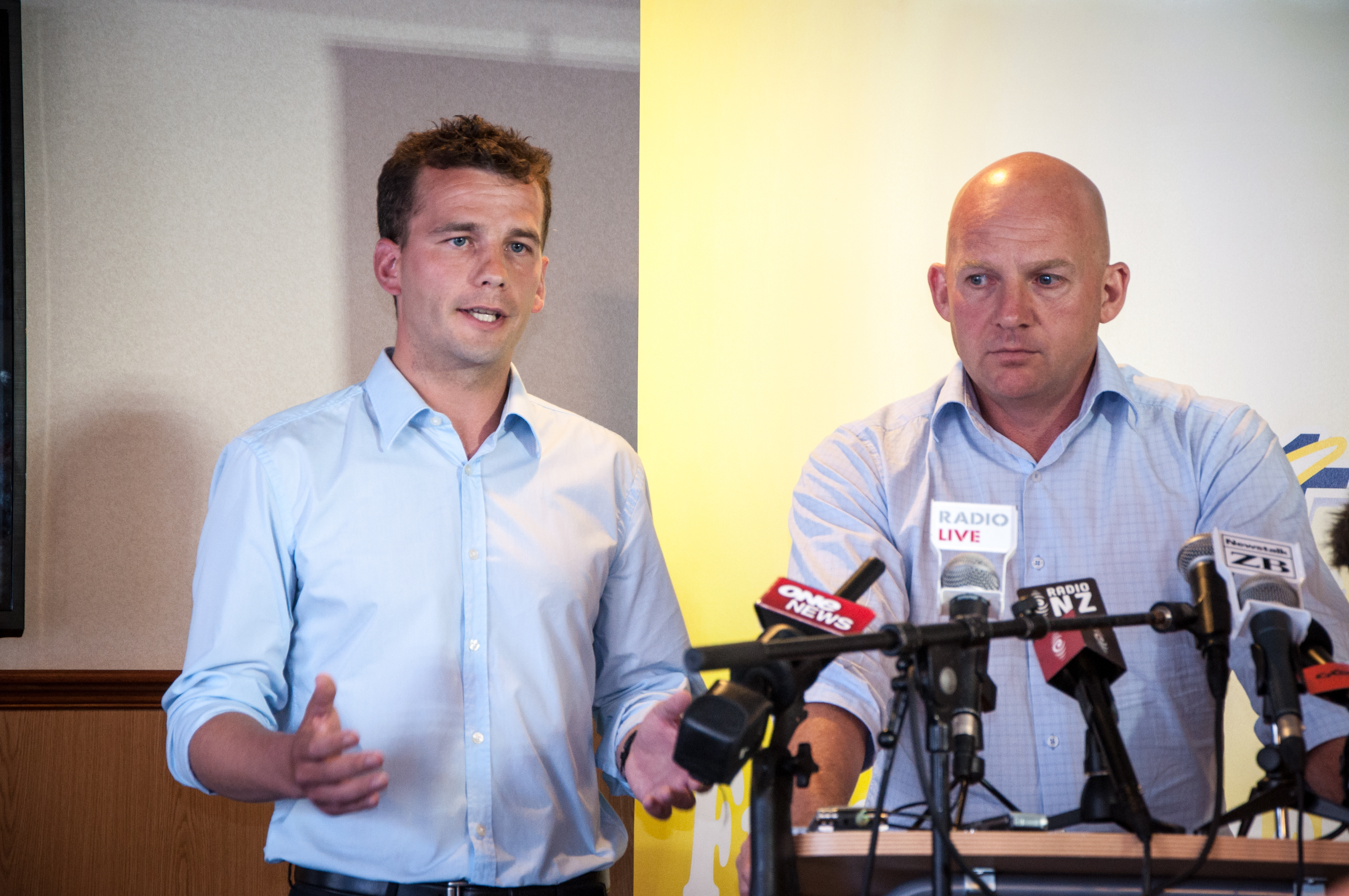
Seymour (left) alongside Jamie Whyte at a press conference announcing their selections as the Epsom candidate and party leader respectively, 2014

In February 2014, at the same time that Jamie Whyte was made leader of the ACT Party, Seymour won the nomination to stand as the party's candidate for Epsom. The electorate had already proven strategically important for ACT. Seymour's selection for Epsom, over former deputy leader and party president John Boscawen, was described by political commentators as the "clean slate" choice and a "fresh face". Seymour was the first confirmed candidate for the Epsom electorate, and at an Epsom public meeting during his campaign he was described as "the most popular with the crowd" and "the star of the night, intelligent, witty and articulate".

During the 2014 election campaign, Seymour released a campaign video online which the ACT Party described as going "viral" after it received around 35,000 views. Seymour said of the video: "I think it was just totally real, we didn't set out to make it funny or make it a viral video, it was just me being me, that combination with rather retro production values ... you wouldn't want to watch it standing up." Seymour was endorsed for the Epsom electorate by Prime Minister John Key, despite Key's National colleague Paul Goldsmith also contesting the electorate.

== Fifth National Government ==
=== First term (2014–2017) ===
At the election, Seymour was elected for the Epsom electorate with a majority of 4,250 votes. Jamie Whyte did not win in his bid for the Pakuranga electorate, and Seymour replaced Whyte as the leader of ACT on 3 October 2014.

==== Ministerial portfolios ====
National returned as a minority government with ACT in confidence and supply in 2014, and Seymour was appointed parliamentary under-secretary to the Minister of Education and Minister of Regulatory Reform on 29 September 2014, as a result of National's confidence and supply agreement with ACT. Seymour was given responsibility for partnership schools, and reforms to the Resource Management Act 1991 and other regulation.

In October 2015, a Labour Party member's bill to make parliamentary under-secretaries subject to the Official Information Act passed its first reading in Parliament. Seymour accused the bill of personally attacking him, and said it was not necessary because under-secretaries did not have decision-making powers. Nonetheless, Seymour was one of 109 members of Parliament who voted in favour of the legislation at its third reading in June 2016.

Contracts in the second round of applications for charter (partnership) schools were completed on 11 September 2014. In January 2016, the contract was terminated for a Northland charter school from the first round, Te Pūmanawa o te Wairua. Seymour continued to support the policy and push for more charter schools to be established.

==== End of Life Choice Bill ====
On 6 June 2015, Seymour confirmed that he was preparing a member's bill known as the End of Life Choice Bill that would legalise assisted dying. This bill was in response to the decision in Seales v Attorney-General that stated only parliament had the ability to address assisted suicide laws. On 14 October 2015, Seymour lodged the End of Life Choice Bill into the member's ballot, launched a website promoting his bill, and released an ACT-commissioned poll of 2800 people showing 66% public support in favour of legalising assisted dying. The bill passed its first reading 76–44 in December 2017 and its second reading 70–50 in June 2019. In the committee of the whole House, support from the New Zealand First party became conditional on a referendum to decide whether the law should come into force. An amendment to require a referendum passed 69–51, and the bill passed its third reading with the same numbers on 13 November. The bill received royal assent on 16 November 2019, becoming the End of Life Choice Act 2019. A referendum was held on 17 October 2020. The vote was held in conjunction with the 2020 general election, and official results were released on 6 November 2020. It was accepted by New Zealand voters, with 65.1% in support and 33.7% opposed.

==== Sale and Supply of Alcohol legislation ====
In August 2015, Seymour introduced a member's bill to allow bars and rugby clubs to extend their bar trading hours when they are televising games from the Rugby World Cup. Most games, due to the time difference between New Zealand and England, started between 4 am and 6 am New Zealand Time, meaning that alcohol would not usually have been allowed to be sold. Despite opposition from the Green Party and the Māori Party, Seymour's bill passed all three readings, meaning that bars and rugby clubs were allowed to open for Rugby World Cup games.

==== LGBTI cross-party group ====
In 2015, Seymour became a member of a cross-party group initiated by Jan Logie to look at and advocate for LGBTI rights. The group also included: Catherine Delahunty (Green), Chris Bishop (National), Denis O'Rourke (NZ First), Denise Roche (Green), James Shaw (Green), Kevin Hague (Green), Louisa Wall (Labour), Nanaia Mahuta (Labour), Paul Foster-Bell (National), and Trevor Mallard (Labour).

== In Opposition (2017–2023) ==
=== Second term (2017–2020) ===
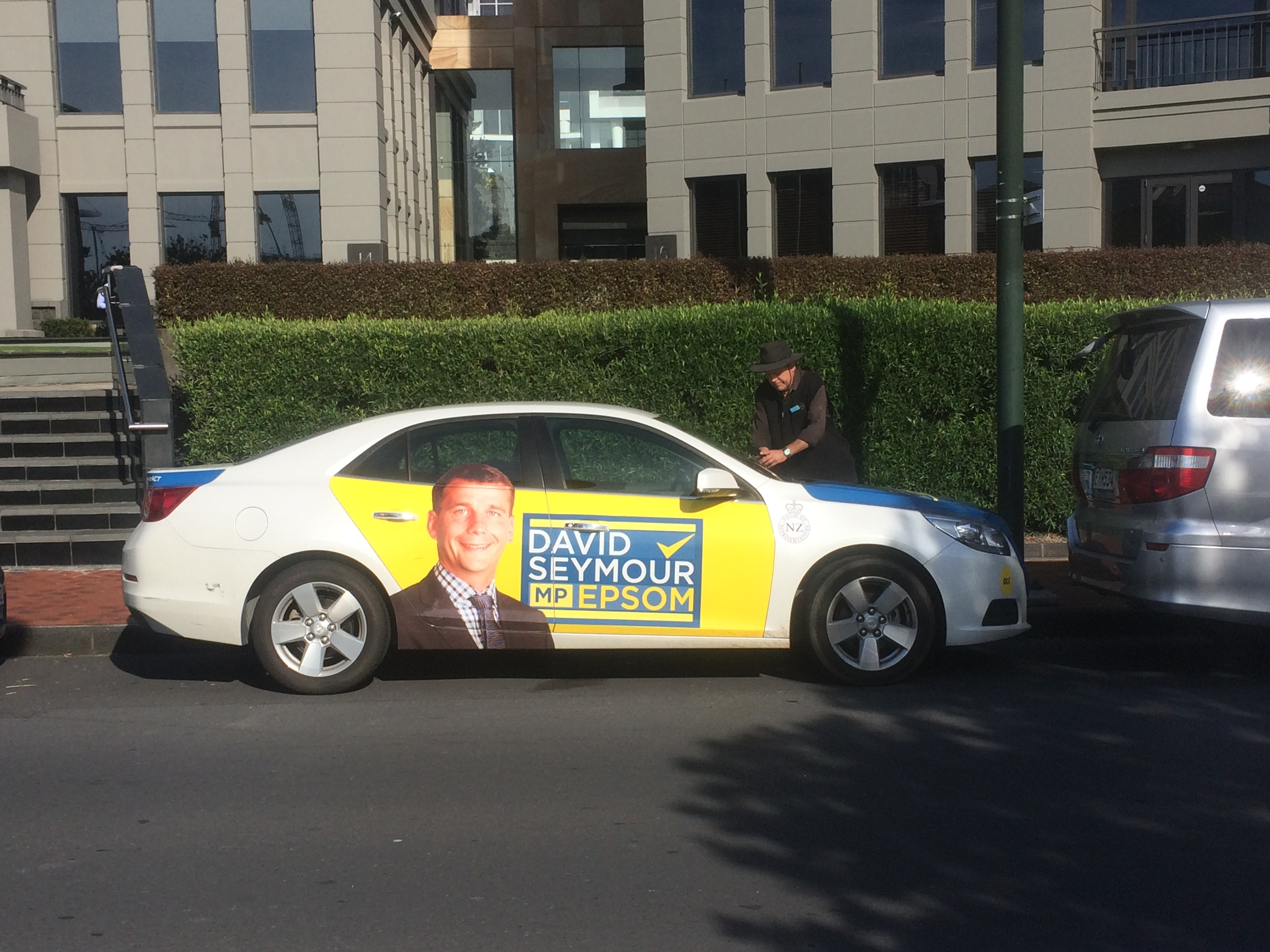
David Seymour's electorate car at the Viaduct Harbour, May 2018

Seymour was re-elected to Parliament for Epsom in the 2017 general election as the sole ACT Member of Parliament.

==== End of Life Choice Act ====
On 8 June 2017, Seymour's bill was selected from the members' ballot. The bill was debated at its first reading on 13 December 2017, and passed with 76 votes in favour and 44 against. It was then reviewed by the Justice Select Committee. It reappeared before the House for a second reading on 26 June 2019 and passed, with 70 votes in favour, 50 opposed. An amendment to the bill, which included the requirement that it be approved by a binding referendum before it would take effect, passed prior to its third reading with 63 votes in favour and 57 opposed. The bill reappeared before the House and passed its third reading on 13 November 2019 with 69 votes in favour and 51 votes against.

In an interview on the day of the third reading, Seymour said that he was confident that the public would vote to put the act into law, noting that "there was overwhelming support and it should easily pass the referendum." The act was approved in the 2020 New Zealand euthanasia referendum, which was held in conjunction with the 2020 general election, with a 65.91% of voters in favour of the act.

==== Gun control ====
Seymour was the sole Member of Parliament to oppose the Labour-led coalition government's Arms (Prohibited Firearms, Magazines, and Parts) Amendment Act 2019, which bans all semi-automatic firearms used during the Christchurch mosque shootings that occurred on 15 March 2019. Although he missed an initial procedural vote on the bill, he still cast a No vote when voting on the actual bill took place with a final result of 119 to 1. Seymour criticised the speed of the government's gun control legislation.

==== Zero Carbon Act 2019 ====
Despite announcing that the ACT party would vote against the Climate Change Response (Zero Carbon) Amendment Act, Seymour was absent from the vote on the bill's third reading. This allowed it to pass into law with unanimous support, 119–0, drawing the attention of local media.

==== Abortion Legislation Act 2020 ====
Seymour supported the Abortion Legislation Act 2020 but argued that "safe zones", which would have established 150-metre protest-free areas around abortion clinics, would infringe upon freedom of expression. Prior to the third reading of the bill on 10 March 2020, Seymour successfully included an amendment eliminating safe zones around abortion clinics. The bill passed its third reading on 18 March, receiving royal assent on 23 March. Safe zones were eventually reinstated through the Contraception, Sterilisation, and Abortion (Safe Areas) Amendment Act 2022, which Seymour supported.

==== COVID-19 pandemic (2020) ====
During the COVID-19 pandemic in New Zealand, Seymour served as a member of the Epidemic Response Committee from 25 March 2020.

=== Third term (2020–2023) ===
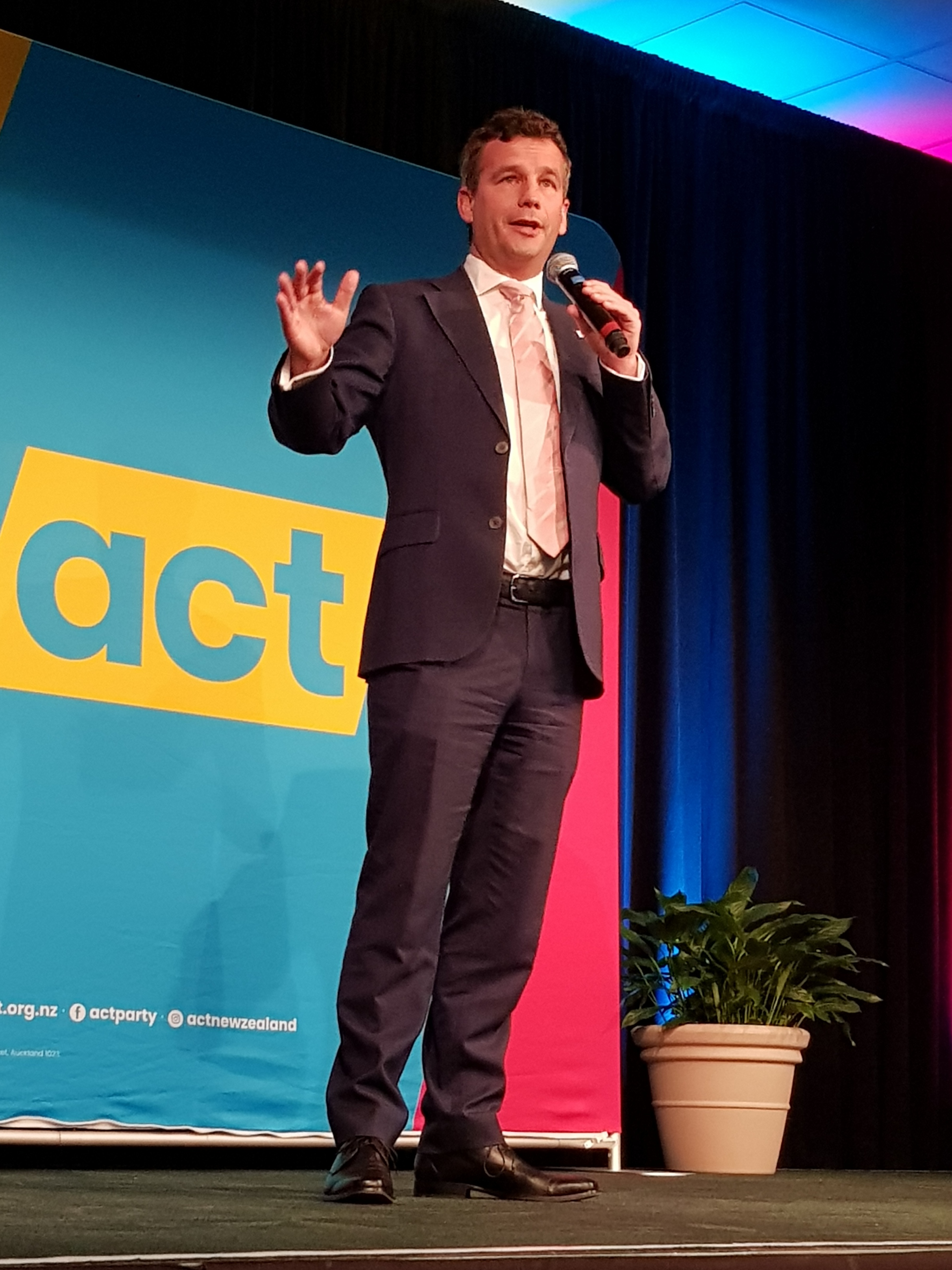
David Seymour speaking in Palmerston North, July 2023

During the 2020 New Zealand general election, Seymour contested the Epsom electorate and was re-elected by a margin of 9,224 votes. In addition, ACT won eight percent of the popular vote, winning ten seats in Parliament (with nine on the party list). In the much expanded caucus, Seymour held the specific portfolios of Finance and COVID-19 Response spokespersons, while remaining leader of the ACT party.

Seymour's third member's bill to be debated in Parliament, the Regulatory Standards Bill, was drawn from the ballot in June 2021. It proposed stricter rules around government regulation making but failed its first reading in July 2021 without the support of the Labour government. Following that bill's introduction, but before its defeat, Seymour announced his next member's bill would establish a legislative framework for four-year terms of Parliament.

==== COVID-19 pandemic ====
Following the Delta variant outbreak that began in August 2021, Seymour released ACT's COVID 3.0 strategy, which advocated replacing the government's elimination strategy with a "harm minimisation" strategy that focused on isolating infected individuals and easing border restrictions for travellers from low risk countries. In November 2021, Seymour advocated a regular testing regime for unvaccinated workers instead of the government's vaccine mandate for education, health and hospitality workers.

In December 2021, Seymour opposed the proposed joint Police and Māori iwi (tribal) checkpoints that screened travellers from Auckland heading into the Northland region from 15 December, arguing they would restrict people's freedom of movement. These checkpoints were located at State Highway 1 in Uretiti and State Highway 12 near Maungaturoto through the initiative of former Mana Movement leader Hone Harawira's Tai Tokerau Border Control. Seymour's criticisms were echoed by National Party leader Christopher Luxon and New Zealand First politicians Winston Peters and Shane Jones. In response, Labour's deputy leader and Te Tai Tokerau Member of Parliament Kelvin Davis alleged that criticism of the iwi-led checkpoints was motivated by anti-Māori racism.

==== 2022 "arrogant prick" incident ====
In mid-December 2022, Seymour questioned Prime Minister Jacinda Ardern during Parliamentary question time, and as she sat down after answering, she was recorded calling him an "arrogant prick" on a hot mic, which meant the remark was recorded in Hansard. Ardern later issued a personal apology to him because, she said, her remarks were now on record. As New Zealand parliamentary debates are televised, the comment also aired on television. The two politicians subsequently joined to raise NZ$60,000 for the Prostate Cancer Foundation by auctioning a signed and framed copy of the Prime Minister's remark.

== Sixth National Government ==
=== Fourth term (2023–present) ===
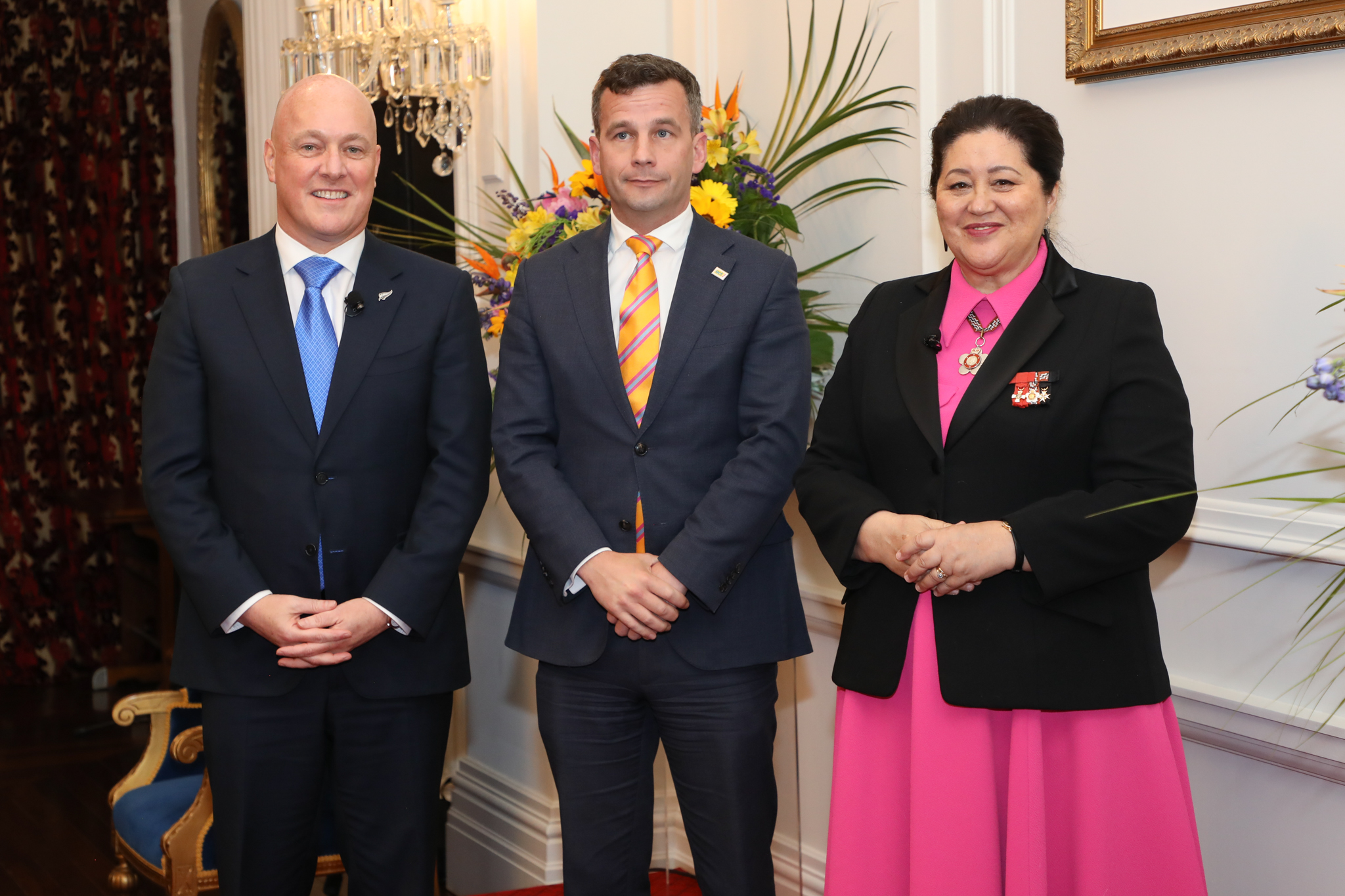
David Seymour with Prime Minister Christopher Luxon and Governor General, Rt Hon Dame Cindy Kiro, after their appointment as ministers at Government House on 27 November 2023

In the 2023 New Zealand general election held on 14 October, Seymour was re-elected in Epsom by a margin of 8,142 votes. ACT won 8.64 percent of the popular vote and gained 11 seats in Parliament. Following the election, ACT entered into coalition talks with the National and New Zealand First parties to form a new government.

On 24 November, the three parties concluded coalition talks and reached an agreement on policy issues and ministerial portfolios. Seymour expressed confidence that ACT had secured a favourable coalition deal. He told The New Zealand Herald that the Government would announce a 100-day plan that could include repealing some legislation passed by the outgoing Labour government.

As part of the coalition negotiations, Seymour will share the position of deputy prime minister with Peters for the term of the 54th New Zealand Parliament. Peters served as deputy prime minister until 31 May 2025, and then Seymour assumed the office until the conclusion of the term. He is the first minister for regulation, a portfolio he proposed. He was also appointed as an associate minister of education (partnership schools), finance, and health (Pharmac).

==== Associate education minister ====
In early March 2024 Seymour, in his capacity as Associate Minister of Education, confirmed that the $350 million Government-funded school lunch programme "Ka Ora, Ka Ako" would be reviewed prior to the 2024 New Zealand budget. He claimed there was no evidence that the school lunch programme had improved school achievement and attendance. Seymour cited a 2023 Treasury report which found that 12 percent of lunches (roughly 10,000 a day) were wasted. He has also suggested imposing fines on parents for truancy. The contract was due to expire at the end of 2024. The school lunch programme serves 220,000 students across New Zealand. In response, Porirua College deputy principal John Topp and attendance officer Mose Skipworth defended the school lunches programme and said that scrapping it would lead to an increase in truancy. In response, the Health Coalition Aotearoa sought a meeting with Seymour to argue for the school lunch programme, arguing that scaling back or shutting down the programme would worsen hardship and poor educational outcomes among deprived children.

On 14 March 2024, Seymour visited Freyberg High School in Palmerston North and met with staff members, including principal Graeme Williams, to discuss truancy. Towards the end of the visit, several students staged the haka (posture dance) "Ka Mate" to protest against the Government's proposal to slash the free school lunch programme Ka Ora, Ka Ako and perceived anti-Māori policies. One student waving the national Māori flag also spat near Seymour. Williams condemned the students' behaviour as "totally unacceptable" and said that those responsible would be subject to disciplinary procedures. Seymour said that one or two students failed to respect tikanga Māori/Māori cultural values including hospitality and that the students were being affected by "torrents of information that isn't quite true." Seymour also expressed interest in meeting Freyberg High School students on his next visit. Following a 7,000-strong petition supporting the students, Williams announced that the school would not discipline the students involved in the protest but would instead work with the local iwi (tribe) Ngāti Ruanui Tumu Whakaae, the Ministry of Education, and board of trustees to implement a restorative process to address the incident.

In early April 2024, Seymour created an eight-member "Charter School/Kura Hourua Establishment Board" to facilitate the reintroduction of charter schools. The Board is headed by St Cuthbert's College principal Justine Mahon, with other notable members including Glen Denham and Professor Elizabeth Rata. The Board aims to reestablish charter schools by 2025. On 16 April, Seymour announced several changes to the early childhood education sector including easing teaching qualification requirements, allowing the government to decide the location of early childhood centres, and introducing mandatory reporting of child abuse.

On 1 May 2024, Seymour confirmed that the Government would continue to fund the previous Labour Government's free school lunches programme for a few years until the completion of a review into the programme. On 8 May, Seymour announced the Government's modified school lunch programme, which would cost $234.8 million for the 2025 school year. Under the revised scheme, 10,000 pre-schoolers in low-equity, non-profit early childhood centres would be eligible for free morning tea and lunch five days a week at a cost of $4 million. While the school lunch programme would remain unchanged for primary school students in 2025, the school lunch programme for intermediate and high school students would be bulk-purchased by the Government and delivered to schools.

On 14 May, Seymour announced that the Government would allocate $153 million from the 2024 budget to convert 35 state schools into charter schools and establish 15 new charter schools between 2025 and 2026. Labour's education spokesperson Jan Tinetti, Green education spokesperson Lawrence Xu-Nan, the New Zealand Educational Institute (NZEI) and the Post Primary Teachers' Association (PPTA) objected to the Government's charter school plans on the grounds that they were "profit-driven", would divert funding from overwhelmed state schools, disadvantaged children with behavioural issues and disabilities and did not have to hire qualified teachers. By contrast, Innovative Education Consultants head consultant Alwyn Poole and St Stephen's School co-principal Nathan Durie welcomed the reintroduction of charter schools, arguing that they would meet the needs of children and bring flexibility to the educational system.

In late September 2024, Seymour confirmed that the Government would prosecute parents for persistent truancy and remove teacher-only days during school term time. This policy was subsequently reversed by Education Minister Erica Stanford, who confirmed four "teacher only days" in 2025 for state schools to implement the Government's new curriculum.

In mid-October 2024, Seymour released details of the Government's revised free school lunch programme, which would be launched in Term 1 2024. Seymour said that the revamped programme would save $130 million a year, with meals costing an average of NZ$3. Meals would consist of chicken katsu, butter chicken, lasagne, chicken pasta salad and wraps. Meals for students in Years 0 to 9 would be an average of 240 grams while meals for older students would be at least 300g with additional items including fruit, yoghurt or muesli bars. Schools would receive funding and resources to either prepare their meals internally, iwi/hapū providers and external suppliers including Gilmours, Foodstuffs, Watties and Hellers.

On 19 December 2024, Seymour and Tertiary Education Minister Penny Simmonds announced that the Government would amend the Education and Training Act 2020 to strengthen universities' free speech obligations.

In late April 2025, Seymour issued a letter to the 78 mayors of the local district councils, urging them to combat truancy and to boost school attendance in their local communities. Several mayors including Mayor of Christchurch Phil Mauger regarded Seymour's letter as hypocritical due to the government's earlier messaging that local governments should focus on core services like roads and water.

==== Associate finance minister ====
On 10 March 2024, Seymour announced that the Government would restore interest deductions on residential investment properties.

==== Associate health minister (Pharmac) ====
During the 2023 New Zealand general election, ACT had campaigned on reversing a 2011 law change reclassifying pseudoephedrine as a prescribed pharmaceutical drug. Seymour had argued that this restriction limited the supply of over the counter cold and flu medication. Following the formation of Sixth National Government, the National Party agreed to ease restrictions on the sale of pseudoephedrine as part of its coalition agreement with ACT. On 20 February 2024, Associate Health Minister Seymour introduced the amendment bill into Parliament. The bill passed into law and received royal assent in early April 2024.

In mid-July 2024, Associate Health Minister Seymour had instructed the pharmaceutical purchasing agency Pharmac to stop factorising the Treaty of Waitangi in its decisions, writing that "Pharmac's role should focus on delivering improved health outcomes underpinned by robust data and evidence, in accordance with its statutory responsibilities. This should serve all New Zealanders based on actual need, without assigning their background as a proxy of need." While Seymour's directive was supported by Pharmac board chair Paula Bennett and Patient Voice Aotearoa chair Malcolm Mulholland, it was criticised by former Māori Health Authority clinical lead Dr Rawiri McKree Jansen, who said that the Government could do more to improve Māori access to health services and medicines.

==== Acting prime minister ====
Seymour served as acting prime minister from 14 to 20 July 2024 during Prime Minister Luxon's personal leave following his trip to the US. Deputy Prime Minister Winston Peters was unavailable for the role as he was visiting Japan and South Korea at the time. As acting prime minister, Seymour toured the Government's Military-Style Academy Pilot for youth offenders with Children's Minister Karen Chhour and the media on 20 July.

==== Regulation ====
As Minister for Regulation, Seymour is the sponsor of the proposed Regulatory Standards Bill, saying that its purpose was to "increase transparency in lawmaking." He said that the proposed bill would prioritise individual and property rights, enabling business growth and opportunities. The Regulatory Standards Bill has been criticised by University of Auckland law Professor Jane Kelsey, who said it would circumscribe scrutiny and prioritised property rights over other considerations including the Treaty of Waitangi, the environment and workplace safety. Similarly, researcher Melanie Nelson claimed the bill lacked a "democratic mandate for constitutional changes of this magnitude." By contrast, New Zealand Initiative senior research fellow Bryce Wilkinson argued that good quality legislation was needed to protect personal autonomy and property.

On 13 November, Seymour's Regulatory Standards Bill passed its third reading along party lines; with the National, Act and NZ First parties voting in favour and the Labour, Green and Māori parties opposing the bill. During the final debate, Seymour argued that the bill would help identify the costs of new legislation and collective projects on the public.

=== 2026 general election ===
During the 2026 New Zealand general election, Seymour was ranked first on the ACT a party list and contested the Epsom electorate. Based on preliminary results released on 8 November, he retained Epsom by a margin of 2,044 votes, defeating National and Labour MPs Paul Goldsmith and Camilla Belich.

== Political views and controversies ==
Seymour's political views are often considered right-libertarian or right-wing populist. Victoria University of Wellington scholar Luke Oldfield has described Seymour's ACT as combining targeting "‘wasteful spending’ and ‘the racial divide’" into a cohesive populist platform, seeking to simultaneously "wind back policies that enhanced the ability of those identifying as Māori to more effectively participate in the decision-making processes of central and local government" and cut public service expenditure.

Seymour has embraced libertarian social policies during his tenure as ACT Party leader, such as supporting the legalisation of euthanasia, and introducing the End of Life Choice Act 2019. Seymour has been associated with majoritarian views in regards to Māori politics and the Treaty of Waitangi, and under his leadership ACT has campaigned particularly to erode initiatives specifically for indigenous rights. He has emerged as a vocal opponent of co-governance with Māori, and supports raising the retirement age and enacting tax cuts. Seymour has increasingly caused controversy for his outspoken views, which include comparing co-governance with apartheid, opposing Māori vaccination prioritisation, and a joke about sending Guy Fawkes to blow up the Ministry of Pacific Peoples. He is also a proponent of Anglophone interests, supporting stricter English-language requirements for prospective immigrants, opposing bilingual road signs and services to teach public servants the Māori language, and voting for the English Language Act 2026. Seymour has been described as a majoritarian by Stuff, and one who justifies his views in claiming that protecting the rights of minorities through non-elected institutions (such as the Waitangi Tribunal and Te Puni Kōkiri) is in conflict with the majority of the population.

=== Co-governance ===
Since 2021, Seymour has been a vocal opponent of co-governance initiatives, a term referring to Māori people and the Crown sharing decision-making. In Parliament, he has opposed Three Waters, He Puapua, the Māori Health Authority and the Rotorua District Council (Representation Arrangements) Bill. He said: "The net result [of co-governance] is that someone who's not accountable to the wider community gets the right to say 'no' because of their birth. It's a recipe for frustration at best and resentment and division at worst." After Seymour proposed to abolish the Ministry of Māori Development, Labour MP Willie Jackson labelled Seymour a "useless Maori" and "that [he] would 'do anything' for votes."

During the 2023 electoral campaign, Seymour advocated for a referendum on co-governance. There was strong opposition to the proposal by those who saw it as divisive. Seymour was quoted as saying, "I think there is a real need for us to have a genuine, high-quality conversation around co-governance."

On 19 January 2024, a draft of the ACT party's Treaty Principles Bill was leaked. It was met with criticism from many Māori political figures, including Te Pāti Māori co-leaders Debbie Ngarewa-Packer and Rawiri Waititi, as well as from academics, such as Michael Belgrave, a historian and Massey University professor, "Anyone who knows anything about this topic wouldn't come up with this policy... [Act] don't have any understanding of the 50 years of Treaty principles debate". Leaked advice from the Ministry of Justice suggested that the bill was "highly contentious" due to "the fundamental constitutional nature of the subject matter and the lack of consultation with the public on the policy development prior to Select Committee".

Paul Goldsmith, the Minister of Justice, subsequently appeared on television to re-confirm prime minister Christopher Luxon's position on the proposed bill, saying that "the coalition agreement is clear that the government will support a bill on Treaty principles to first reading. However, Christopher Luxon has been clear that National has no intention to support it beyond that." Ultimately, the bill was voted down on its second reading on 10 April 2025.

As reported in February 2024, a poll on various matters before the government showed 36% of respondents in support of a referendum "on the Treaty of Waitangi" with 35% opposed, and the rest undecided.

=== Criticism of hate speech laws ===
In mid-May 2019, Seymour generated widespread criticism, including from MPs from all of the other parties, when he stated in a radio interview that Green Party list MP Golriz Ghahraman was a "menace to freedom in [New Zealand]." Critics suggested Seymour's association of Ghahraman's support for hate speech laws with suppression of free speech by dictators like Mao Zedong and Adolf Hitler was inappropriate. Seymour argued that he had merely "attacked her views".

Seymour's concern is that the strengthening of hate speech laws is "divisive and dangerous" since the power of the state could be used by the majority to "silence unpopular views". He believes, if the law is strengthened, that what is considered hate speech will become "too subjective" and open to being abused.

=== Public release of Māori vaccination code ===
In September 2021, Seymour caused a controversy after releasing a special COVID-19 vaccination appointment access code meant exclusively for Māori people in Auckland to his followers on Twitter. The code was intended for the population that is the least vaccinated and most at-risk for COVID-19 demographic in New Zealand. The code offered priority access for Māori who wished to be vaccinated by Whānau Waipareira (a Māori social services agency) at the Trusts Arena in West Auckland. While the move was supported by right-wing groups, it was criticised by Whānau Waipareira CEO John Tamihere and Seymour was faced with allegations of racism towards Māori despite his own Māori heritage.

Seymour defended his actions, stating that "access to vaccination has been the same for people of all ethnic backgrounds." He alleged that the code was a move by the government that suggested "Māori people have trouble making a booking". He told media that "the virus doesn't discriminate on race, so neither should the roll out."

=== Ministry for Pacific Peoples remarks ===
On 17 August 2023, Seymour joked about bombing the Ministry for Pacific Peoples during an interview with Newstalk ZB following revelations about wasteful spending by the Ministry earlier in August. During the interview, Seymour claimed "in his fantasy' he would "send a guy like Guy Fawkes" into the Ministry's headquarters and "it'd all be over", apparently implying he would have it blown up. This was a reference to the Gunpowder Plot, planned in 1605 by English Catholic plotters but foiled at the last minute. ACT has campaigned for the abolition of the Ministry, alongside the Human Rights Commission and Ministry for Women. Seymour's remarks were criticised by Deputy Prime Minister Carmel Sepuloni and former National Party minister Alfred Ngaro as inflammatory and insensitive towards Pasifika New Zealanders. Te Pāti Māori leader Debbie Ngarewa-Packer accused him of hate speech. Prime Minister Chris Hipkins condemned Seymour's comments, 'should be ashamed of himself'. Seymour refused to apologise for his remarks, claiming he was joking.

Someone subsequently filed a Police report against Seymour for his remarks, but no offence was identified.

=== Links to the Atlas Network ===
In a 2023 interview with Mihingarangi Forbes, Seymour was questioned about his links to the Atlas Network, an American think tank and policy institute known for its climate change denial. Seymour firmly denounced Forbes' line of questioning and described his supposed connection to the group as a "crazy conspiracy theory". However, during his work for the Canadian conservative think tank Frontier Centre for Public Policy, Seymour was a graduate of the Atlas Networks' 2008 "MBA for Think Tanks" program. A clip of Seymour during his time working for the Frontier Centre for Public Policy, in which he spoke with a deliberately acquired Canadian accent, subsequently went viral. In his 2021 Waitangi Day speech, available on the ACT Party website, Seymour also referred to "my old friends at the Atlas Network". Seymour accepts the scientific consensus on climate change, and has denied the ACT Party is contributing to climate change denial after a 2008 ACT party policy under Rodney Hide stated there is "no warming trend since 1970". Seymour said he disagreed with that statement saying "I believe New Zealand is warming".

=== ‘Snapchatting’ minors ===
In June and July 2024, media reports highlighted that the Seymour had historically exchanged Snapchat messages and "streaks" with high school students starting around 2016, when some of the users were 14 years old. This included sending followers a photo of a condom, dressed-up in full ACT Party branding, along with the message "Be Safe Kids".

Seymour he used Snapchat extensively during the period he was on Dancing with the Stars in 2018. School-aged children would send him messages, including photos of themselves in uniform, and he always responded.

Seymour said he still used it to reply to “serious questions” a few times a month and does not see any issue with directly messaging young people without parental permission or oversight.

=== School lunches ===
Seymour shrank the budget for free school lunches, a programme introduced by the previous Sixth Labour Government that he has long opposed. On 8 May 2024, Seymour had launched a modified NZ$234.8 million school lunch programme for the 2025 school year. While the school lunch programme would remained unchanged for primary school students, the school lunch programme for intermediate and high school students would be bulk-purchased by the Government and delivered to schools. During the press announcement, Seymour stated that the bulk-purchased food would consist of sandwiches and fruit rather than quinoa, couscous, and hummus. When asked about food items such as sushi, Seymour said "If you don't get that sushi's woke, then I don't know how to wake you up, but the key message here is that we are introducing the kinds of foods that are put in the lunchboxes of children, the other 75 percent of kids, who rely on their parents to send their lunch." Labour's education spokesperson Jan Tinetti welcomed the retention of the school lunch programme but expressed concerns about changes to the secondary school lunch programme. Health Coalition Aotearoa co-chair Professor Boyd Swinburn questioned the nutritional value of bulk-purchased foods while Dish Magazine editor Sarah Tuck defended the nutritional value of quinoa and sushi.

At the start of the 2025 school year between late January and early February 2025, several schools reported problems with the revised school lunch programme including late or missed deliveries, uncooked food, insufficient nutrition, food wastage, ham in halal meals and a shortage of vegetarian meals. Consequently, several schools were forced to use their own funds to buy meals for pupils. In response to rollout issues and criticism, Seymour apologised for "teething issues" in the rollout of school lunches, which he attributed to operational issues behind delivering large amounts of meals. Seymour accepted the school lunch scheme needed improvements but defended cost-cutting measures as necessary to saving taxpayer money. By contrast, Labour's education spokesperson Tinetti criticised the National-led government for allegedly prioritising tax cuts over proper nutrition for children.

On 27 February 2025, Seymour rejected calls to sack school lunch provider School Lunch Collective and argued that the current school lunch programme was better than Labour's iteration. On 1 March, Prime Minister Luxon said that the school lunch programme was experiencing "teething issues" and said that Seymour "will work his way through those issues... and I expect he will [find a solution]." On 4 March, the Ministry for Primary Industries launched an investigation into School Lunch Collective meals after children were served meals with melted plastic packaging.

On 11 March, the Libelle Group went into liquidation. The company had been contracted by the Compass Group to provide 125,000 meals to the Government's school meal programme. By 12 March, Radio New Zealand reported that the School Lunch Collective had turned to Australian providers to address the shortfall caused by Libelle's liquidation.

=== Philip Polkinghorne letter ===
On 9 February 2025, Seymour acknowledged that he had written a letter to Auckland District Commander Karyn Malthus in April 2022 complaining about former eye surgeon Philip Polkinghorne's treatment by Police during the course of their investigation into the death of his wife Pauline Hanna. Seymour said that he had written to Police in his capacity as Polkinghorne's electorate member of Parliament. Seymour had written the letter prior to Police charging Polkinghorne with murder in August 2022. On 10 February 2025, Prime Minister Luxon criticised Seymour's letter as "ill-advised" since Polkinghorne was the subject of an active Police investigation at the time. In response, Seymour countered that he was advocating for a constituent and believed that Police had gone "beyond the brief" of their investigation at the time. Later that night, Seymour met with Luxon to resolve their differences regarding the Polkinghorne letter. Seymour's actions were also criticised by Labour Party leader Chris Hipkins, who called for his resignation as a cabinet minister, and Chief Victims' Advisor Ruth Money, who said that Seymour should have raised Polkinghorne's concerns with the Independent Police Conduct Authority (IPCA).

=== Handling of Tim Jago sexual assault allegations ===
In early 2025, Seymour was criticised for advising a sexual abuse survivor to contact an employment lawyer instead of the police after being warned that former ACT Party president Tim Jago had sexually assaulted several teenage boys in the 1990s.

Seymour was initially contacted by the victim’s wife about then-ACT president Jago being a “sexual predator” in November 2022, two months before Jago was charged with indecent assault and exited from the ACT Party.

Jago was subsequently convicted of eight charges of indecent assault in 2024.

Seymour denied wrongdoing in his handling of the complaint and suggestions he tried to cover up the complaint.

=== 2025 Land Rover fundraiser ===
On 10 February 2025, Seymour attracted media attention after driving a 1948 Land Rover up the steps of the New Zealand House of Representatives in order to raise funds for the University of Auckland's Centre for Heart Research's heart valve development programme. The Land Rover had been purchased from Dunedin by the centre's director Professor Julian Paton, who was relocating it to Auckland. A security officer stopped Seymour from completing the full climb and informed him that he did not have permission from the Speaker of the House. During the incident, Seymour said "you shouldn't have to get permission do to every little thing in New Zealand" and said that Members of Parliament should not need to seek permission since Parliament was their workplace. On 11 February, Speaker Gerry Brownlee rebuked Seymour for suggesting that MPs could do as they please at Parliament. Seymour subsequently apologised for his actions in a letter.

=== 2025 Cabinet restructuring proposal ===
During a speech to the Tauranga Business Chamber on 1 May 2025, Seymour proposed reducing the number of New Zealand Cabinet ministers, describing the current ministerial lineup as "looking bloated and full of meaningless titles." He said:

We currently have 82 ministerial portfolios... held by 28 ministers. And under them, we have 41 separate government departments. Something has to change... sure, that might put me and a few of my colleagues out of a job. But if that's the price... then it's worth it.

Seymour has proposed reducing the ministerial lineup to 20 cabinet ministers, with no associate positions except for the Minister of Finance.

On 15 February 2026, Seymour said the that ACT party would campaign on reducing government spending and merging portfolios during the party's State of the Nation address. On 19 February, he advocated merging the Ministry for Ethnic Communities, Ministry for Women, Ministry for Pacific Peoples, Office for Seniors, Ministry of Youth Development and Te Puni Kōkiri (Ministry for Māori Development) into the Ministry for Culture and Heritage.

=== Regulatory Standards Bill ===
In late June 2025, Seymour published several social media posts targeting several critics of his Regulatory Standards Bill, whom he claimed were suffering from a "derangement syndrome." These critics included Mayor of Wellington Tory Whanau, Labour MP Willie Jackson, academics Dame Anne Salmond, George Laking, and Metiria Turei. In response, Whanau and Salmond accused Seymour of breaching the Cabinet Manual and announced they would lodge complaints with the Prime Minister and the New Zealand Cabinet Office. Similar criticism was echoed by Labour leader Chris Hipkins, who said that Seymour's conduct was "unbecoming" of a Minister of the Crown. In response to criticism, Seymour said he was responding to "incorrect statements" and "being playful with them."

In June 2025, the United Nations Special Rapporteur on the Rights of Indigenous Peoples Albert Kwokwo Barume wrote a letter to the New Zealand Government raising concerns about several policies affecting indigenous people including the Regulatory Standards Bill. Barume said that the legislation risked undermining the Government's Treaty of Waitangi obligations and sidelining Māori. In mid July 2025, Seymour wrote a letter dismissing the United Nations' concerns as "insane." In response, Prime Minister Luxon and Foreign Minister Peters criticised Seymour for writing a reply without consulting with his Cabinet colleagues. Following a meeting with Luxon, Seymour agreed to rescind his letter and allow Peters to issue an official response to Barume's letter.

=== Colonialism ===
During his address at the political gathering on the eve of the 2026 Waitangi Day, Seymour made remarks defending colonialism in New Zealand. He said: "I'm always amazed by the myopic drone that colonisation and everything that's happened in our country was all bad. The truth is that very few things are completely bad." Seymour's remarks attracted boos and heckling from the crowd in attendance, with the Deputy Prime Minister dismissing his critics as "a couple of muppets shouting in the dark." Later, Seymour defended his remarks about colonialism, saying "it had been more good than bad, as even the poorest people in New Zealand today live like Kings and Queens compared with most places in most times in history." Seymour also defended the failed Treaty Principles Bill and expressed hope that it would become law in the future.

=== Financial literacy ===
In April 2026, Seymour proposed giving $500 a year to every Year 11 student to start an investment account. He suggested that the policy could be funded by deducting five percent (or $30 million) from the $600 million annual KiwiSaver subsidy. The cash injection would be accompanied by financial literacy education including assessments each term. Seymour said that "for a relatively modest amount of funding, we could give a generation a practical introduction to saving, investing, ownership and financial responsibility."

== Personal life ==
Seymour appeared on the seventh series of Dancing with the Stars. He competed to raise funds for Kidsline, a youth telephone counselling service. His professional dancing partner was Amelia McGregor. Despite harsh criticism from the judges, he finished 5th.

In an interview in 2021, Seymour said he would love to start a family and would "give up politics in a heartbeat". In November 2024, he announced he had been dating Alexandra Martelli, an Auckland property buyer for the last two years, adding that he was "effectively married to Parliament" which gets in the way of starting a family. They got engaged in 2025.

During the summer holidays in January 2026 Seymour, in his capacity as Deputy Prime Minister, and Martelli visited the libertarian Argentinian President Javier Milei and Argentinian Foreign Minister Pablo Quirno. The two leaders also exchanged gifts and political tips and experiences.

== Honours ==
In late August 2025, Ukrainian president Volodymyr Zelenskyy awarded Seymour the Order of Merit, Third Class for supporting Ukrainian territorial integrity and sovereignty, charitable activity and promoting Ukraine in the world. Seymour was one of 143 recipients of the Order of Merit in 2025, which included political figures from Portugal, Finland, Croatia and the Netherlands.

== Electoral history ==
=== 2005 election ===
2005 general election: Mount Albert
Notes:	Blue background denotes the winner of the electorate vote. Pink background denotes a candidate elected from their party list. Yellow background denotes an electorate win by a list member, or other incumbent. A ✓ or ✗ denotes status of any incumbent, win or lose respectively.						
Party	Candidate	Votes	%	±%	Party votes	%	±%
Labour	✓ Helen Clark	20,918	66.55	−1.94	17,501	54.33	+2.53
National	Ravi Musuku	6,169	19.63		8,488	26.35	+13.33
Green	Jon Carapiet	1,485	4.72	−0.67	2,985	9.27	−1.35
NZ First	Julian Batchelor	746	2.37		1,089	3.38	−3.01
ACT	David Seymour	746	2.37		651	2.02	−5.09
United Future	Tony Gordon	529	1.68		649	2.01	−3.28
Progressive	Jenny Wilson	407	1.29		525	1.59	−0.10
Destiny	Anne Williamson	337	1.07		157	0.49	
Independent	Jim Bagnall	83	0.26				
Anti-Capitalist Alliance	Daphna Whitmore	79	0.25	-0.15			
Independent	Anthony Ravlich	47	0.15				
Direct Democracy	Howard Ponga	30	0.10		10	0.03	
Independent	Erik Taylor	29	0.09				
Māori Party					168	0.52	
Legalise Cannabis					43	0.13	−0.40
Christian Heritage					40	0.12	−0.89
Alliance					22	0.07	−1.69
Family Rights					20	0.06	
Libertarianz					19	0.06	
RONZ					8	0.02	
99 MP					6	0.02	
Democrats					3	0.01	
One NZ					0	0.00	−0.01
Informal votes		316			130		
Total valid votes		31,747			32,342		
Labour hold	Majority	14,749					

=== 2011 election ===
2011 general election: Auckland Central
Notes:	Blue background denotes the winner of the electorate vote. Pink background denotes a candidate elected from their party list. Yellow background denotes an electorate win by a list member, or other incumbent. A ✓ or ✗ denotes status of any incumbent, win or lose respectively.						
Party	Candidate	Votes	%	±%	Party votes	%	±%
National	✓ Nikki Kaye	15,038	45.39	+2.48	14,447	42.24	+2.15
Labour	Jacinda Ardern	14,321	43.23	+4.69	8,590	25.11	–9.44
Green	Denise Roche	2,903	8.76	–4.66	7,797	22.79	+7.33
NZ First	Allen Davies	412	1.24	+1.24	1,403	4.10	+1.81
Conservative	Stephen Greenfield	238	0.72	+0.72	280	0.82	+0.82
ACT	David Seymour	149	0.45	–1.25	404	1.18	–2.95
Human Rights	Anthony van den Heuval	68	0.21	+0.01			
Māori Party					562	1.64	+0.71
Mana					237	0.69	+0.69
Democrats					202	0.59	+0.56
Legalise Cannabis					146	0.43	+0.14
United Future					75	0.22	–0.46
Libertarianz					53	0.15	+0.08
Alliance					10	0.03	–0.002
Informal votes		352			164		
Total valid votes		33,129			34,206		
National hold	Majority	717	2.16	–2.21			

=== 2014 election ===
2014 general election: Epsom
Notes:	Blue background denotes the winner of the electorate vote. Pink background denotes a candidate elected from their party list. Yellow background denotes an electorate win by a list member, or other incumbent. A ✓ or ✗ denotes status of any incumbent, win or lose respectively.						
Party	Candidate	Votes	%	±%	Party votes	%	±%
ACT	David Seymour	15,966	43.08	−1.02	1,023	2.72	+0.17
National	Paul Goldsmith	11,716	31.61	−6.19	23,904	63.45	−1.07
Labour	Michael Wood	3,470	9.36	−1.09	5,045	13.39	−2.16
Green	Julie Anne Genter	3,021	8.15	+2.14	4,706	12.49	+0.46
Conservative	Christine Rankin	1,725	4.65	+3.70	932	2.47	+1.35
NZ First	Cliff Lyon	621	1.68	+1.68	1,308	3.47	+0.86
Mana	Patrick O'Dea	106	0.29	+0.11			
Independent	Grace Haden	59	0.16	+0.16			
Independent	Matthew Goode	37	0.10	−0.06			
Independent	Susanna Kruger	31	0.08	+0.08			
Independent	Adam Holland	21	0.06	+0.06			
Internet Mana					312	0.83	+0.67 (Note: 2014 Internet Mana swing is relative to the votes for Mana in 2011; it shared a party list with Internet in the 2014 election.)
Māori Party					174	0.46	−0.13
Legalise Cannabis					76	0.20	−0.12
United Future					61	0.16	−0.16
Civilian					17	0.05	+0.05
Democrats					10	0.03	+0.01
Ban 1080					7	0.02	+0.02
Focus					4	0.01	+0.01
Independent Coalition					3	0.01	+0.01
Informal votes		286			93		
Total valid votes		37,059			37,675		
Turnout		37,768	78.09	+2.36			
ACT hold	Majority	4,250	11.28	+4.98			

=== 2017 election ===
2017 general election: Epsom
Notes:	Blue background denotes the winner of the electorate vote. Pink background denotes a candidate elected from their party list. Yellow background denotes an electorate win by a list member, or other incumbent. A ✓ or ✗ denotes status of any incumbent, win or lose respectively.						
Party	Candidate	Votes	%	±%	Party votes	%	±%
ACT	✓ David Seymour	16,505	43.17	+0.09	696	1.78	−0.94
National	Paul Goldsmith	10,986	28.73	−2.87	22,875	58.64	−4.41
Labour	David Parker	7,067	18.49	+9.13	9,575	24.55	+11.16
Green	Barry Coates	2,785	7.28	−0.87	3,263	8.37	−4.13
NZ First	Julian Paul	657	1.72	+0.22	1,229	3.15	−0.32
Conservative	Leighton Baker	230	0.60	−4.05	80	0.20	−2.27
Opportunities					1,043	2.67	—
Māori Party					124	0.32	−0.14
Legalise Cannabis					38	0.10	−0.10
People's Party					34	0.09	—
United Future					24	0.06	−0.10
Ban 1080					9	0.02	0.00
Democrats					7	0.02	−0.01
Outdoors					7	0.02	—
Internet					6	0.02	−0.81 (Note: 2017 Internet Party swing is relative to the votes for Internet-Mana in 2014; it shared a party list with Mana Party in the 2014 election)
Mana Party					6	0.02	−0.81 (Note: 2017 Mana Party swing is relative to the votes for Internet-Mana in 2014; it shared a party list with the Internet Party in the 2014 election)
Informal votes		317			76		
Total valid votes		38,230			39,008		
Turnout		39,422	79.67	+1.58			
ACT hold	Majority	5,519	14.44	+3.16			

=== 2020 election ===
2020 general election: Epsom
Notes:	Blue background denotes the winner of the electorate vote. Pink background denotes a candidate elected from their party list. Yellow background denotes an electorate win by a list member, or other incumbent. A ✓ or ✗ denotes status of any incumbent, win or lose respectively.						
Party	Candidate	Votes	%	±%	Party votes	%	±%
ACT	✓ David Seymour	19,500	46.97	+3.80	4,355	10.36	+8.58
Labour	Camilla Belich	10,276	24.75	+6.26	15,078	35.87	+11.32
National	Paul Goldsmith	6,397	15.41	−13.32	15,668	37.27	−21.37
Green	Kyle MacDonald	3,101	7.47	+0.19	4,596	10.93	+2.56
Opportunities	Adriana Christie	889	2.14	—	822	1.95	−0.72
TEA	Noel Jiang	337	0.81	—	112	0.26	—
New Conservative	Norman Sutton	231	0.79	+0.19	211	0.50	+0.30
Advance NZ	Faith-Joy Aaron	166	0.39	—	147	0.34	—
Sustainable NZ	Shannon Withers	72	0.17	—	30	0.07	—
Outdoors	Maia Prochazka	31	0.07	—	7	0.01	−0.19
Not A Party	Finn Harris	24	0.05	—			
NZ First					609	1.44	−1.71
Māori Party					108	0.25	−0.07
Legalise Cannabis					38	0.08	−0.02
ONE					27	0.06	—
Social Credit					8	0.01	—
Vision NZ					8	0.01	—
Heartland					6	0.01	—
Informal votes		484			203		
Total valid votes		41,508			42,031		
Turnout		42,311	82.84	+3.17			
ACT hold	Majority	9,224	22.22	+7.78			

=== 2023 election ===
2023 general election: Epsom
Notes:	Blue background denotes the winner of the electorate vote. Pink background denotes a candidate elected from their party list. Yellow background denotes an electorate win by a list member, or other incumbent. A ✓ or ✗ denotes status of any incumbent, win or lose respectively.						
Party	Candidate	Votes	%	±%	Party votes	%	±%
ACT	✓ David Seymour	17,826	44.43	−2.54	5,041	12.40	+2.04
National	Paul Goldsmith	9,684	24.14	+8.73	20,948	51.54	+14.27
Labour	Camilla Belich	6,189	15.42	−9.33	5,945	14.62	−21.25
Green	Lawrence Xu-Nan	3,537	8.81	+1.34	5,507	13.55	+2.62
Opportunities	Nina Su	1,803	4.49	+2.35	1,307	3.21	+1.26
NZ First	Tanya Unkovich	573	1.42	—	1,059	2.60	+1.16
NZ Loyal	Anna Rotheray	164	0.40	—	123	0.30	—
Te Pāti Māori					299	0.73	+0.48
NewZeal					76	0.18	−+0.12
Legalise Cannabis					66	0.16	+0.08
Animal Justice					46	0.11	
Freedoms NZ					34	0.08	—
New Conservatives					28	0.06	−0.44
Women's Rights					26	0.06	—
DemocracyNZ					16	0.03	—
New Nation					5	0.01	—
Leighton Baker Party					2	0.00	—
Informal votes		339			109		
Total valid votes		40,115			40,637		
ACT hold	Majority	8,142	20.29	−1.93			

== Notes ==
New Zealand Parliament
Preceded by John Banks	Member of Parliament for Epsom; 2014–present	Incumbent
Political offices
New office	Parliamentary Under-Secretary to the Minister of Education; 2014–2017	Office abolished
New office	Parliamentary Under-Secretary to the Minister for Regulatory Reform; 2014–2017	Office abolished
New office	Minister for Regulation; 2023–present	Incumbent
Preceded by Winston Peters	Deputy Prime Minister of New Zealand; 2025–present	Incumbent
Party political offices
Preceded by Jamie Whyte	Leader of ACT New Zealand; 2014–present	Incumbent
