= Kenneth Wang (psychologist) =

Kenneth T. Wang
- 王子健
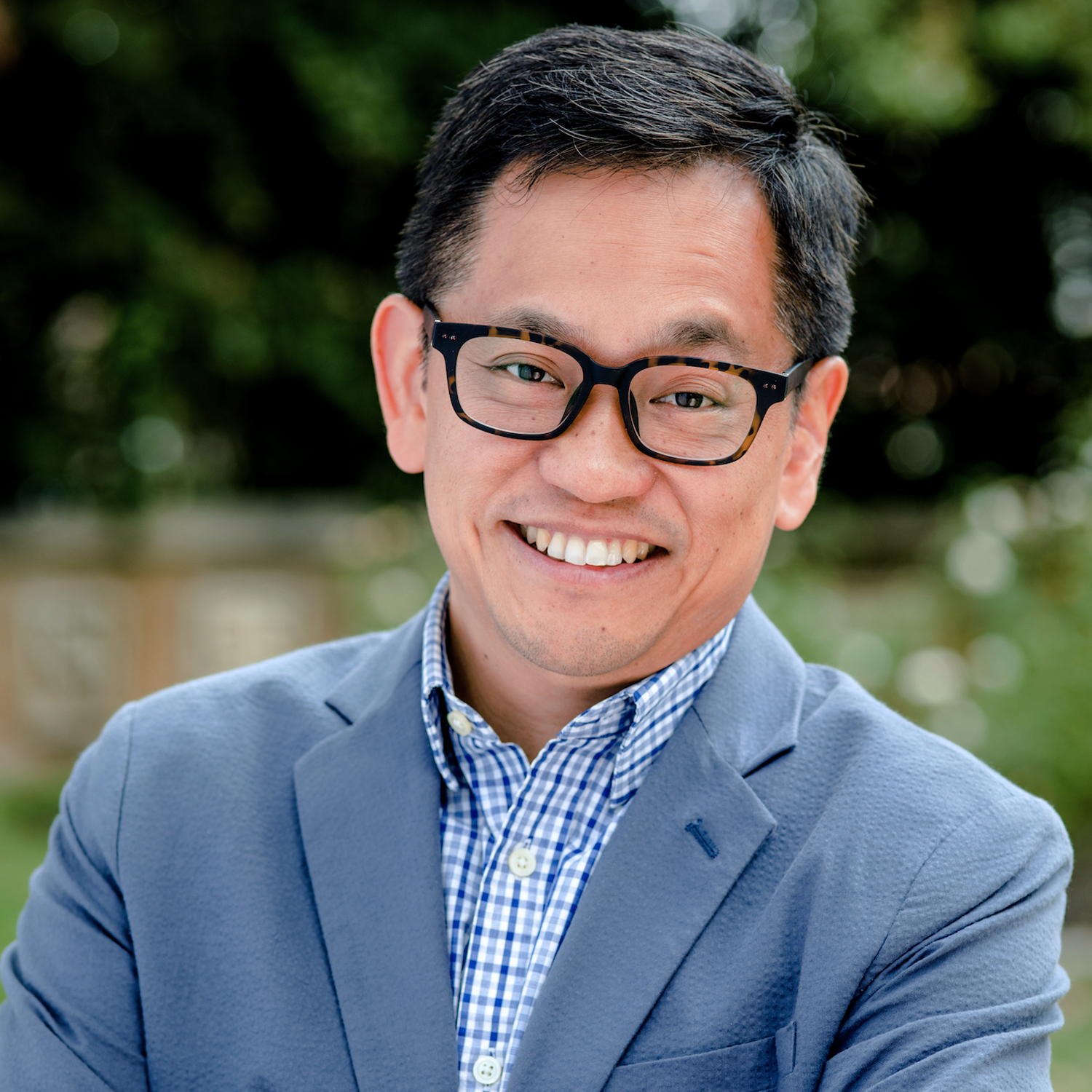
- Born: September 19, 1972 (age 53); Taiwan
- Citizenship: United States; Taiwan
- Education: National Chiao Tung University (BS); Wheaton College (MA); Pennsylvania State University (PhD)
- Awards: Excellent Contribution Award – American Psychological Association – Society of Counseling Psychology – International Section, Fellow of the American Psychological Association
- Scientific career
- Fields: Counseling psychology
- Institutions: Fuller Theological Seminary University of Missouri-Columbia
- Website: kennethwang.com

Kenneth T. Wang (Chinese: 王子健; born September 19, 1972) is a Taiwanese-American psychologist who specializes in research on perfectionism and cross-cultural adjustment. He is a professor and PhD program chair of the Clinical Psychology Department at Fuller Theological Seminary.

== Early life and education ==
Wang was born and raised in Taiwan but lived in Tuscaloosa, Alabama, between the ages of 5 to 10, where he was the first Asian student at his elementary school.

In 1995, Wang earned a Bachelor of Science in management science at National Chiao Tung University before he decided to switch careers into psychology. He moved back to the United States where he earned a Master of Arts in Clinical Psychology at Wheaton College.

After a couple years working back in Taiwan in the Disability Resources Center at National Dong Hwa University and the Psychology Department at National Taiwan University, he went to the United States again in 2003 to earn a PhD in Counseling Psychology from Pennsylvania State University, where he minored in educational psychology with a focus in measurement and statistics.

== Perfectionism ==
Wang is known for his work in the field of perfectionism, particularly his significant contribution to the development and international adoption of a collectivistic framework focused on family perfectionism. Seeking to broaden the scope of perfectionism literature beyond its predominantly Western-centric focus, Wang began by studying perfectionist typology among Taiwanese college students. Due to the collectivistic cultural context of Taiwan, Wang modified the Almost Perfect Scale-Revised (APS-R) to create the Family Almost Perfect Scale (FAPS), designed to measure perceived perfectionism within the family unit. The FAPS, initially validated among Asian American and European American samples, has gained international recognition and has been translated into over 10 languages.

== Cross-cultural adjustment ==
Wang has contributed significantly to the study of cross-cultural adjustment, particularly in the context of international students.

One longitudinal study led by Wang was notable for being the first study on international students that used growth mixture modeling, which highlighted the importance of considering individual differences in studying the longitudinal acculturative adjustment process.

In addition to empirical research, Dr. Wang has made contributions to the development of theoretical models and measures of cross-cultural adjustment. For instance, he created the International Friendly Campus Scale (IFCS), which shifted the focus from identifying negative student characteristics to understanding the impact of external environments (such as the campus) on international student adjustment. He also developed the Cross-Cultural Loss Scale (CCLS), which conceptualizes cultural transition challenges as inevitable losses, encouraging a perspective of loss and regrowth rather than a sense of self-deficiency.

Furthermore, Wang co-authored a chapter in the APA Handbook of Counseling Psychology introducing the Cross-National Cultural Competence model (CNCC). This model integrates layers of factors (such as personality, attitudes, coping variables, immersion experiences, and cognitive and affective processing of cultural encounters), providing a more comprehensive understanding of cross-national cultural competency development.

== Personal life ==
Wang is married with two children.

== Awards and fellowships ==
- In 2023, Wang received an Excellent Contribution Award from the American Psychological Association in the International Section of the Society of Counseling Psychology.
- In 2023, he was named a Fellow of the American Psychological Association.

== Publications ==
Wang has authored or co-authored nearly 100 published articles or books and has been cited almost 8000 times. Some notable works are listed below.

Books:

- Heppner, P. P., Wampold, B. E., ^{+}Owen, J. J., ^{+}Thompson, M. N., & ^{+}Wang, K. T. (2015). Research Design in Counseling (4th ed.). Belmont, CA: Thomas Brooks/Cole. [^{+}equal contributions, authors listed alphabetically]

Journal Articles:

- Wang, K. T. (2007). Perfectionism in Chinese university students from Taiwan: A study of psychological well-being and achievement motivation. Personality and Individual Differences, 42, 1279-1290. https://doi.org/10.1016/j.paid.2006.10.006
- Wang, K. T. (2010). The Family Almost Perfect Scale: Development, psychometric properties, and comparing Asian and European Americans. Asian American Journal of Psychology, 1, 186-199. https://doi.org/10.1037/a0020732
- Wang, K. T., Heppner, P. P., Fu, C. C., Zhao, R., Li, F., & Chuang, C. C. (2012). Profiles of acculturative adjustment patterns among Chinese international students. Journal of Counseling Psychology, 59, 424-436. https://doi.org/10.1037/a0028532
- Wang, K. T., Wong, Y. J., & Fu, C. C. (2013). Moderation effects of perfectionism and discrimination on interpersonal factors and suicide ideation. Journal of Counseling Psychology, 60, 367-378. https://doi.org/10.1037/a0032551
- Wang, K. T., Li, F., Wang, Y., Hunt, E. N., Yan, G. C., & Currey, D. E. (2014). The International Friendly Campus Scale: Development and psychometric evaluation. International Journal of Intercultural Relations, 42, 118-128. https://doi.org/10.1016/j.ijintrel.2014.05.004
- Wang, K. T., Sheveleva, M. S., & Permyakova, T. M. (2019). Imposter syndrome among Russian students: The link between perfectionism and psychological distress. Personality and Individual Differences, 143, 1-6. https://doi.org/10.1016/j.paid.2019.02.005
- Wang, K. T., Wei, M., Zhao, R., Chuang, C. C., & Li, F. (2015). The Cross-Cultural Loss Scale: Development and psychometric evaluation. Psychological Assessment, 27, 42-53. https://doi.org/10.1037/pas0000027
- Wang, K. T., Xie, Z. Y., Parsely, A. C., & Johnson, A. M. (2020). Religious Perfectionism Scale among believers of multiple faiths in China: Development and psychometric analysis. Journal of Religion & Health, 59, 318–333. https://doi.org/10.1007/s10943-019-00784-z
- Wang, K. T., & Goh, M. (2020). Cultural intelligence. In B. J. Carducci (Editor-in-Chief) & J. S. Mio & R. E. Riggio (Vol. Eds.), The Wiley-Blackwell encyclopedia of personality and individual differences: Vol. IV. Clinical, applied, and cross-cultural research. Hoboken, NJ: John Wiley & Sons.
- Wang, K. T., Cowan, K., Eriksson, C. B., Januzik, M., & Conant, M. (2022). Religious Views of Suffering Profile Groups during COVID-19. Religions, 13(5), 453. https://doi.org/10.3390/rel13050453
