= Death of Pauline Hanna =

2021 death in New Zealand

Pauline Hanna
- Born: Pauline Kay Hanna; 21 February 1958; Havelock North, Hawke's Bay, New Zealand
- Died: April 2021 (age 63)
- Body discovered: 5 April 2021; Remuera, Auckland, New Zealand

Pauline Kay Hanna (21 February 1958 – April 2021) was a New Zealand woman who was found dead in her home in Remuera, Auckland, that she shared with her husband, Philip Polkinghorne, on 5 April 2021. The circumstances of her death attracted significant media attention after Polkinghorne was accused of murdering her and staging the death as suicide by hanging. On 23 September 2024, Polkinghorne was acquitted following an eight week-long murder trial at the Auckland High Court.

== Background ==
=== Pauline Hanna ===
Pauline Kay Hanna was born on 21 February 1958, and was raised on a farm in Havelock North, Hawke's Bay, New Zealand. She studied at the University of Otago and received a master's degree in business administration.

At the time of her death on 5 April 2021, Hanna was married to eye specialist Philip Polkinghorne. She was also an executive project director at the Counties Manukau District Health Board, where she had worked in several roles since 1998. She also led Auckland's COVID-19 supply chain at the time of her death. The couple met through work with Hanna becoming step-mother to Polkinghorne's three children from his first marriage. According to Polkinghorne, Hanna had a good relationship with her step-children and had a grandson.

=== Philip Polkinghorne ===
The defendant Philip Polkinghorne was a trained vitreoretinal surgeon, medical retina specialist and cataract surgeon. He also worked as a consultant at eye surgery practice Auckland Eye and served as an associate professor at the University of Auckland's Department of Ophthalmology. He was also a visiting lecturer at the University of Otago. In addition, Polkinghorne was involved in several international and national learned societies and professional bodies including the Oxford Congress, American Academy of Ophthalmology, American Society of Retinal Specialists, the Oceania Retinal Association, the Asian Vitreoretinal Advisor Group, the Oceania Retinal Association and the Australian and New Zealand Retinal Specialists Association. By 2014, he had published over 50 academic papers, edited 50 papers, edits ophthalmology journals and reviewed several international journals. Polkinghorne was not an employee of Auckland Eye but worked as a contractor through his own company 2020 Limited.

Before marrying Hanna, Polkinghorne had an earlier marriage which produced three sons named Taine, Ben and John Polkinghorne. His first wife divorced him in 1991 due to Polkinghorne having an extramarital affair. The two shared custody over their three children.

== Death and aftermath ==
According to Polkinghorne, Hanna had worked through the 2021 Easter holiday weekend but the couple were able to spend time together on Easter Sunday (4 April). The couple visited Highland Park where Hanna visited a vaccination station before having lunch together and returning to their Upland Road home in Auckland's Remuera suburb. Polkinghorne also said that the couple had dinner together before watching television. Before going to bed, Polkinghorne also said that Hanna had helped him to write a letter. According to The New Zealand Herald, Hanna was still sending work emails at 10pm on Sunday night.

On 5 April 2021, Polkinghorne said that he had found his wife Pauline Hanna dead in the early hours of the morning. While preparing to make her breakfast at 7:00 am, Polkinghorne said that he found Hanna dead. Polkinghorne's sister said that she and Polkinghorne had found Hanna on the ground covered by a duvet. There were two pieces of rope hanging from the balustrade and the staircase. Polkinghorne later told Hato Hone St John emergency responder Hannah Matheson that a 111 operator had told him to "cut her down." According to Matheson, Polkinghorne said that his wife was suffering from depression but was unaware of what medications she took. Matheson also noticed that Polkinghorne had a fresh graze on his forehead, which he said he was unaware of.

During an interview with The Weekend Herald published on 10 April, Polkinghorne denied there were problems with their marriage and said that he was unaware of her state of mind at the time. He also suggested that Hanna was affected by her mother's death six weeks earlier. Polkinghorne also said that he "believed she was overworked but she was extremely highly regarded by her work colleagues." Polkinghorne also ruled out an intruder entering their home. He described the loss of his wife as "insurmountable" and describe their relationship as "perfect." Pokinghorne also told The Herald that police were treating him as a person of interest. On 15 April, Hanna's funeral was held at the Holy Trinity Cathedral in Parnell, which was attended by her family, friends and colleagues including her husband Polkinghorne.

== Investigation ==
Shortly after arriving at the house, police detective constable Christian Iogha performed a "tension check" on the orange nylon rope tied to the handrail at top of the stairs that Hanna had allegedly hanged herself with, to confirm that it could handle the weight of a body. He gently tugged the rope, and it quickly began unravelling. Detective Ilona Walton, who witnessed the check, later testified that "it seemed unusual and not normal that the rope would unravel in that manner", and she informed her sergeant. Iogha examined the rope again and became suspicious after noticing that it had not been pulled to the base of the handrail by Hanna's weight during the suicide. Polkinghorne, who was giving a statement to the police in the house, was asked to continue outside so that the scene would not be contaminated.

Soon after the test was conducted, police decided to treat the case as suspicious. Polkinghorne was taken to be questioned at the Auckland Central Police Station, where Walton conducted a three-hour interview with him. During the interview, he recounted finding Hanna's body and repeatedly spoke off-topic. The New Zealand police remained at the home for nine days, performing forensic searches and extensively sampling for DNA and stains found in the house. Hanna's bedroom was found dishevelled, with what appeared to be a blood stain on the bed, though no evidence was found that her body had been moved from the room to the spot it was initially found. Police found a drug pipe, lighter, and 37.7 grams of methamphetamine throughout the house, with Polkinghorne's DNA found on the containers. They also found a belt in the kitchen with a pattern that corresponded with the distinctive markings found on Hanna's neck.

On 6 April, Dr. Kilak Kesha performed a post-mortem examination on Hanna. He observed several injuries on her body, including abrasions on her nose and back, haemorrhages on her face and fresh bruises on her arm that he believed indicated she had been grabbed. Ligature marks were found on her neck. Her tongue was protruding, which he noted often happened during hanging suicides. A low level of alcohol and high amounts of unprescribed zopiclone sleeping pills were also found in her system. From the examination, he determined that Hanna had died as a result of strangulation, though was unable to determine whether or not the death was self-inflicted.

In May 2021, police confirmed that traces of methamphetamine had been found at the couple's Upland Road residence. By April 2022, the police confirmed that detectives had interviewed several of Polkinghorne's associates including a masseuse and a barber. Newshub also reported that Hanna had hired a private investigator prior to her death, and that Polkinghorne had been in a relationship with an Australian escort named Madison Ashton for several years. Ashton and Polkinghorne had first met in 2011 in Sydney. While their professional relationship had initially involved Hanna, it had developed into a personal one by 2017. Ashton was unaware that Polkinghorne was still married to Hanna at the time of her death.

Ashton later told The New Zealand Herald and Stuff that police had raided her and Polkinghorne while the two were staying at the Mt Cook Lakeside Retreat on 30 April 2021. During the raid, Detective Sergeant Lisa Anderson had demanded access to two phones that Ashton owned but she had refused to give them the codes. Police subsequently gained access to the phones' data through other means. Due to her perceived adverse treatment by the police, Ashton refused to appear as a Crown witness at Polkinghorne's trial. Ashton ignored a summons from the New Zealand police and Australian law enforcement, who subsequently sought help from Interpol. During the duration of the trial, Ashton travelled to Europe.

== Prosecution and arraignment ==
Polkinghorne was formally charged with the murder of Hanna in August 2022, sixteen months after her death in April 2021. He made his first court appearance in the Auckland District Court on 16 August, and pleaded not guilty to the charges. He was released on bail by Judge Andrea Manuel whilst awaiting his trial. He made an appearance at the Auckland High Court on 31 August, and his trial was scheduled.

== Trial ==
Polkinghorne's trial began on 29 July 2024 at the Auckland High Court, before Justice Graham Lang and a jury. His lawyer in the trial was Ron Mansfield KC, and the prosecutor was Crown Law Office solicitor Alysha McClintock. On 12 September, Lang discharged a juror due to an upcoming personal commitment that could not be changed. The remaining 11 jurors consisted of eight women and three men.

=== Opening arguments ===
The prosecution case was that Polkinghorne's marriage to Hanna had deteriorated, and he had strangled her and staged the death as a suicide. McClintock argued in her opening statement that he was spending considerable amounts of money on sex workers and methamphetamine, the latter of which had made him behave aggressively and angrily. The defence counter-argued that Hanna had made previous suicide attempts and struggled with mental health issues, and that her death was a suicide. Mansfield argued that the couple's relationship was stable, and that Polkinghorne's use of methamphetamine was "casual". He pleaded guilty to possession of methamphetamine and a pipe, but denied murdering Hanna. During the first day of the trial, the Court also heard the 111 call made by Polkinghorne that alerted emergency authorities to her death.

=== Crown evidence ===
The court heard evidence from emergency responders, police officers, forensic scientists Fiona Matheson, Helen Poulsen, Nicholas Curnow, and several friends and relatives of Hanna and Polkinghorne. Deborah Boyd, the chief executive of Auckland Eye, also gave evidence corroborating Polkinghorne's methamphetamine. Earlier, the defendant had pleaded guilty to methamphetamine use and possessing a pipe. The Crown also presented several expert witnesses including pathologist Kilak Kesha, police forensic accountant Margaret Skilton, addiction specialist psychiatrist Dr Emma Schwarcz, detective Andrew Reeves, and digital forensics expert Jun Lee.

A key piece of evidence in the Crown's case against Polkinghorne was an orange rope found hanging from the balustrade of the Polkinghorne home. During the trial, Canadian forensic rope and knot analyst Robert Chisnall testified that the rope found tied to the balustrades appeared to be "too long and too insecure to suspend any weight." The jury, prosecution and defence teams also visited Polkinghorne's Remuera mansion to help understand the evidence.

Hanna's general practitioner also testified that Hanna was a regular consumer of fluoxetine and alcohol, and had been seeking professional help with her alcoholism prior to her death.

=== Defence evidence ===
In response to the Crown's evidence, Polkinghorne's defence counsel Mansfield submitted medical records of Hanna's visit to a Remuera clinic in 2004 which recorded that she had been referred for specialist treatment due to her severe depression and relationship strife with Polkinghorne's children. He also told the court that Hanna had spent a total of $33,745 in 2019 and $39,225 in 2020 for personal use including clothes, beauty products, hair and dry cleaning. Mansfield also read Hanna's email discussing the impact of her long work hours on her mental health.

On 30 August, Mansfield delivered his opening address and confirmed that Polkinghorne would not be giving testimony. The defence summoned several witnesses including Hanna's sister Tracey, Polkinghorne's first wife, Auckland Eye receptionist Sharon Jenkins, JB Were investment manager Tony, theatre hostess Leonie Mary Darlington, ophthalmic nurse Jillian Blakely, Dominic Simon Foote, electrical engineer Jon Beatty, Polkinghorne's accountant Robert Willis, and Hanna's hairdresser Anna Millar. The defence also summoned several expert witnesses including forensic expert Dr Timothy Scanlan, mechanical engineer Andrew MacGregor, forensic pathologist Dr Stephen Cordner, IT expert Atakan Shahho, mental health expert Dr Olav Neilssen, psychiatrist Dr David Menkes, and mental health expert Dr Sarah Hetrick.

=== Closing arguments ===
On 16 September, the Crown prosecutor Alysha McClintock delivered the Crown's closing address. She argued that Polkinghorne had a history of belittling and gaslighting his wife over trivial matters. McClintock also said that Polkinghorne had claimed that the methamphetamine found at the couple's Upland Street address had belonged to her. She also argued that Polkinghorne was a master manipulator who knew Hanna's personal routine and had tried to cover his tracks by hanging a fake rope and staging the scene. On 17 September, McClintock concluded the Crown's case, arguing that Polkinghorne had murdered Hanna in order to pursue a relationship with his mistress Madison Ashton. She cited Hanna's previous injuries to her nose and head, and bruises on her arm as evidence of a struggle. She also reiterated the Crown's evidence that Hanna had told a friend that Polkinghorne had attempted to strangle her in January 2020.

On 17 September, defence lawyer Rons Mansfield KC began the defence's closing address. He reiterated the defence's case that Hanna had a history of mental health issues and had committed suicide. Mansfield argued that Polkinghorne had been unfairly treated by the police and questioned the reliability of Victoria Pheasant and John Riordan's account that the defendant had attempted to strangle Hanna. On 18 September, Mansfield argued that the Crown had depicted Polkinghorne as a villain and murderer by focusing on his extramarital affairs and methamphetamine consumption. Manfield also disputed the Crown's case that Hanna could not divorce Polkinghorne due to her alleged precarious finances and that the defendant's meth consumption had contributed to his alleged murder of Hanna.

On 18 September, Judge Graham Lang summarised the main arguments of the Crown and defence's cases for the jury and gave the jury directions for considering evidence and testimonies. On 19 September, the jury returned to Court to revisit two pieces of audio evidence. The first was an audio recording of Hanna telling relatives about her distaste towards Polkinghorne for his extramarital affairs while the second was Polkinghorne's phone call to emergency services after allegedly discovering Hanna's body. Following several hours of deliberations between 11am and 4:30 pm, the jury departed for the day.

=== Verdict ===
On 23 September 2024, the 11-member jury resumed deliberations. Justice Lang confirmed that he had received a note from jurors. The note stated that most of the jurors thought there was insufficient evidence to support Hanna's suicide but that some jurors thought that the Crown had failed to prove its case that Dr Polkinghorne had murdered his wife by intentionally strangling her. In response, Lang directed the jury to consider the veracity of each question in the question trail. While he clarified that the defence did not have the onus of proof, Lang told them they also had to decide whether the Crown had proven Polkinghorne's guilt beyond reasonable doubt. The jury returned to the jury room to continue deliberating.

On 23 September, the 11-member jury acquitted Polkinghorne of Pauline Hanna's murder. Polkinghorne welcomed his acquittal, stating "Today's outcome is a huge turning point in our lives. This process has taken a massive toll on so many of us." Crown prosecutor Alysha McClintock stated that she respected the verdict the jury had reached in a "difficult case" and confirmed that the Crown would not be appealing the case. Detective Chris Allan said that the police thanked the jury and Hanna's family, and said that the case would be subject to a coronial inquest. Several relatives and friends of Hanna including Bruce Hanna and John Riordan expressed disappointment with the verdict but said they respected the court process.

Polkinghorne's former mistress Madison Ashton, who had refused to testify at the trial as a Crown witness, expressed disagreement with Polkinghorne's acquittal saying that she had been "praying for a guilty verdict." She subsequently told Stuff and The New Zealand Herald that she would have been willing to "wear a wire to help gather evidence" had law enforcement authorities treated her with "respect." Ashton claimed that Polkinghorne had lied to her about being divorced from Hanna during the period before and after her death.

== Responses ==
=== Media coverage ===
In mid-August 2024, the Suicide Prevention Office, the Mental Health Foundation, University of Auckland director of population mental health Dr Sarah Fortune and the University of Melbourne's Centre for Mental Health and Community Wellbeing expressed concerns that extensive media coverage of the Polkinghorne murder trial could lead to an increase risk in suicide attempts and self harm. In response, Justice Lang said that the Auckland High Court did not have the power to dictate how accredited media covered the court proceedings.

During the trial, The New Zealand Herald and Stuff ran competing podcasts and live blogs covering developments in the courtroom. These podcasts climbed to the top three on Spotify's podcast rankings for New Zealand. The court proceedings attracted large numbers of spectators in the public gallery. Massey University associate professor of journalism James Holling attributed the unusual media coverage of the Polkinghorne trial to local media's desire to boost ratings during a "quiet news spell" and the trial fulfilling the "classic features" of a "celebrity trial" including a high profile person, a mysterious death and details of sex workers and a double life. In late September 2024, the veteran documentary-maker Mark McNeill confirmed that he was working on a documentary about the Polkinghorne murder trial.

On 13 April 2025, Three released a three-part miniseries entitled Polk: The Trial Of Philip Polkinghorne, focusing on the trial of Polkinghorne. The documentary was executively-produced by Mark McNeill. The documentary makers interviewed Polkinghorne, Madison Ashton, Crown prosecutor Alysha McClintock, Hanna's brother Bruce, friend Pheasant Riordan and private investigator Julia Hartley Moore. Moore told the documentary makers that Hanna had hired her to investigate Polkinghorne's affairs prior to her death in 2021. In addition, Ashton told the documentary makers that she had been planning to marry Polkinghorne prior to Hanna's death. In response, Polkinghorne denounced the documentary as "tabloid clickbait" and alleged he was misled.

=== Post-trial events ===
On 1 November 2024, Polkinghorne was sentenced to 150 hours of community service after pleading guilty to two charges of possessing methamphetamine and a pipe.

On 9 February 2025, The New Zealand Herald reported that ACT leader and Deputy Prime Minister David Seymour had written to the police's Auckland District Commander Karyn Malthus in 2022 after Polkinghorne had approached him complaining about his treatment as a suspect during the police investigation. Seymour had written the letter in April 2022, four months prior to police charging Polkinghorne with Hanna's murder. On 10 February 2025, Prime Minister Christopher Luxon described Seymour's letter as "ill-advised" since Polkinghorne was the subject of an active police investigation. In response, Seymour countered that he was advocating for a constituent and at the time believed that police had gone "beyond the brief." Later that night, Seymour met with Luxon to discuss their differences regarding the Polkinghorne letter. Seymour's actions were also criticised by Labour Party leader Chris Hipkins and Chief Victims' Advisor Ruth Money.

=== Coronial inquest ===
In mid-December 2024, Coroner Tania Tetitaha expressed interest in resuming a 2021 coronial inquest into Hanna's death, citing public interest in the case.
