= Kenneth Wang (politician) =

New Zealand politician (born 1955)

- 王小选
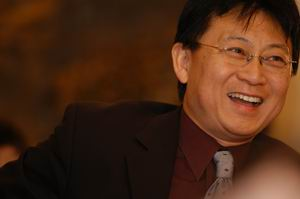

Deputy Leader of ACT Party
- In office April 2014 – 9 July 2017
- Leader: Jamie Whyte; David Seymour
- Preceded by: John Boscawen
- Succeeded by: Beth Houlbrooke

Member of the New Zealand Parliament for ACT Party List
- In office 23 November 2004 – 17 September 2005
- Preceded by: Donna Awatere Huata (Note: Normally, list MPs do not have individual predecessors or successors, but Awatere Huata was expelled during a sitting parliament and therefore was succeeded by Wang.)

Personal details
- Born: Wang Xiaoxuan 王小选; 1955 (age 70–71)
- Party: ACT New Zealand

Kenneth Xiaoxuan Wang (simplified Chinese: 王小选; traditional Chinese: 王小選; pinyin: Wáng Xiǎoxuǎn; born 1955) is a former Deputy Leader of the ACT New Zealand party.

== Biography ==
Wang was born in China, and has three siblings. He arrived in New Zealand in 1984 and is married with two children. Wang worked in the marketing and advertising sector in Auckland. He was New Zealand's second Chinese MP (with the first being Pansy Wong).

At the 2005 election, Wang contested the seat of Mt Roskill, and was seventh on ACT's party list. However, he was not returned to Parliament.

In the 2008 general election, he stood unsuccessfully in the electorate of Botany for the ACT New Zealand Party. National candidate Pansy Wong filed a complaint to the electoral commission about Wang's billboards which exhorted, "Vote for Wang, get Wang and Wong" (because Pansy Wong's high rank on the National Party List assured her of a seat in parliament).

He was elected Deputy Leader of ACT in April 2014. Wang resigned as Deputy Leader on 9 July 2017, after expressing disappointment with his list placing and feelings that ACT had moved away from former policies that compelled him to join the party 15 years earlier.

Wang owns an advertising company in Auckland called 'BananaWorks'.

== Member of Parliament ==
New Zealand Parliament
Years	Term	Electorate	List	Party
2004–2005	47th	List	10	ACT

He previously served as a member of Parliament to replace Donna Awatere Huata, who was expelled from Parliament in November 2004.

== Notes ==
Party political offices
Preceded by John Boscawen	Deputy Leader of ACT New Zealand; 2014–2017	Succeeded by Beth Houlbrooke
