= Jamie Whyte =

New Zealand academic and politician

Dr Jamie Whyte
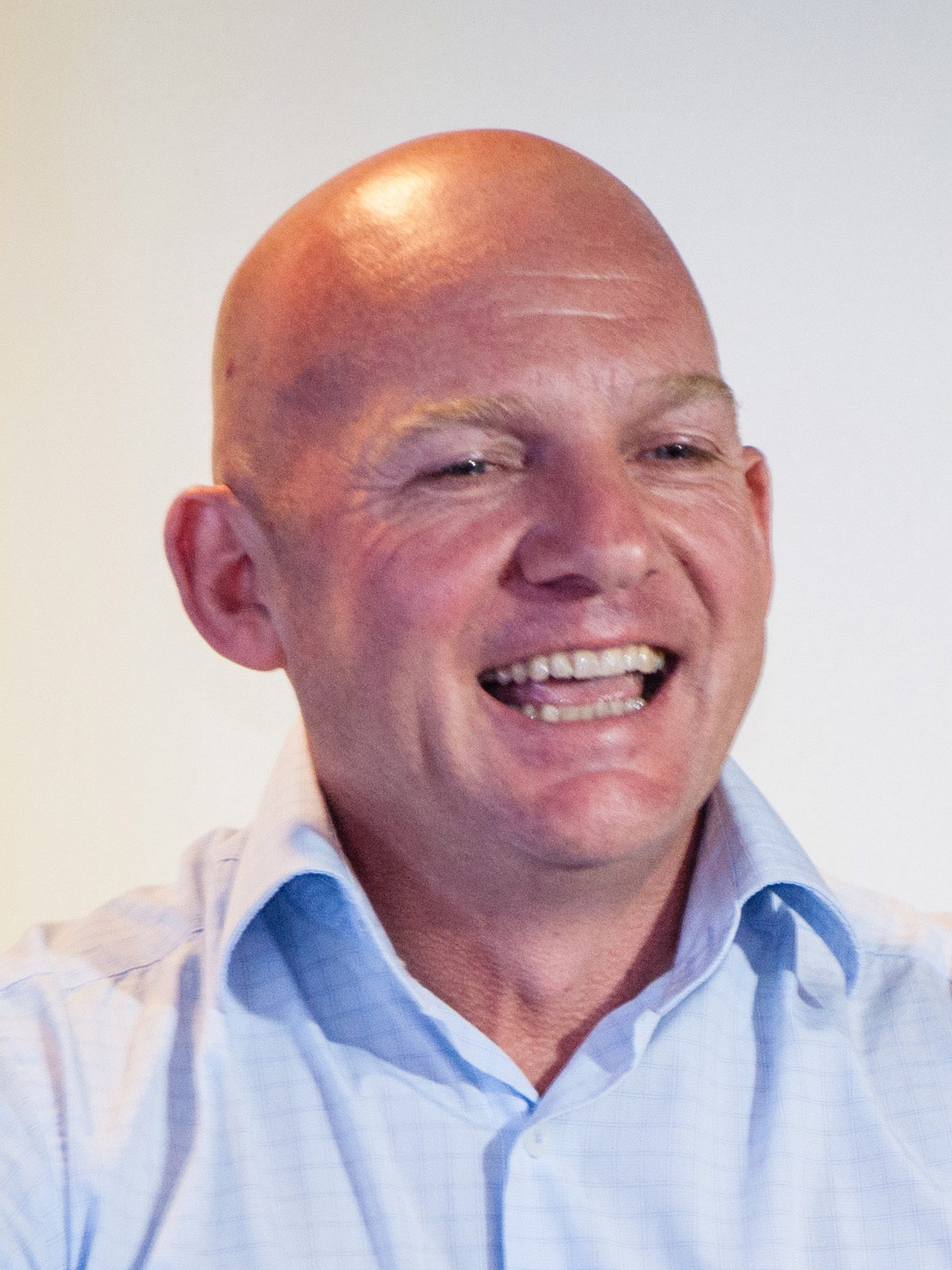
- Jamie Whyte on the day of the announcement of his selection as Leader by ACT

Leader of ACT New Zealand
- In office 2 February 2014 – 3 October 2014
- Preceded by: John Banks
- Succeeded by: David Seymour
- Deputy: vacant

Personal details
- Party: ACT New Zealand
- Spouse: Zainab Whyte
- Children: 2
- Education: University of Auckland, Cambridge University
- Occupation: Philosopher, management consultant
- Website: ACT Party profile

Jamie Whyte is a New Zealand classical-liberal academic and politician who was the Leader of ACT New Zealand in 2014. He unsuccessfully contested the Pakuranga electorate in the 2014 general election. At the election, Whyte held the first position on the party list, but ACT did not achieve enough party votes to secure any list seats. Soon after the 2014 general election, he resigned from the leadership of ACT.

Whyte is a former philosophy lecturer, currency trader and management consultant. He has written books and newspaper columns about reasoning and politics.

== Early life and academia ==
Whyte was born in Auckland, New Zealand. He attended Pakūranga College in East Auckland before going on to attend and receive his undergraduate degree from the University of Auckland. He then moved to the UK to study for an M.Phil and Ph.D at St John's College, Cambridge.

Upon graduation, Whyte remained at Cambridge University for three years as a research fellow at Corpus Christi College and temporarily lectured in the philosophy faculty and at the University of Reading. He won the Analysis journal prize for the best article by a philosopher under the age of 30.

== Early career ==
Whyte then took up a job with the New York-based management consultancy firm Oliver Wyman. He also worked as a foreign currency trader.

== Writing and media ==
Since 2003, Whyte has written books for general audiences and newspaper columns, aiming to expose shoddy reasoning, especially by politicians. In 2006 he won the Reason Foundation Bastiat Prize for journalism (jointly with Tim Harford of the Financial Times) and in 2010 he was named runner-up. In June 2014, Whyte won the Institute of Economic Affairs' Arthur Seldon Memorial Award for Excellence for Quack Policy.

Whyte is the author of Crimes Against Logic (titled Bad Thoughts: A Guide to Clear Thinking in the UK; 2003), A Load of Blair (2005), Free Thoughts (2012) and Quack Policy (2013). He has also written columns for many notable publications, including The Times, City A.M., Standpoint, Financial Times and The Wall Street Journal.

Whyte has also occasionally broadcast on BBC Radio 4 and television.

== Political career ==
In his youth, Whyte was a campaign volunteer for Bob Jones' New Zealand Party in the 1984 general election.

Despite no prior experience in political office, Whyte was elected to the ACT party's leadership at a board meeting in February 2014, beating former MP, John Boscawen. At the same meeting, David Seymour was chosen as ACT's candidate for the Epsom electorate; Kenneth Wang was elected as Whyte's deputy leader in April 2014.

During his tenure as leader, Whyte drew controversy when he stated his opinion that incestuous relationships between consenting adults should not be illegal.

In the 2014 general election, ACT only won enough votes to be represented by David Seymour in the Epsom electorate. After the election, on 3 October 2014 Whyte resigned from the leadership of the party, saying: "Clearly, I make this announcement with regret, however the election result is clear, and I must now turn to my career and my family." He was replaced as ACT leader by Seymour on the day of his resignation.

In February 2017, Whyte joined the Institute of Economic Affairs as Director of Research. He left the think tank on 1 January 2019.

Whyte's political philosophy is classical liberalism, in the tradition of Friedrich Hayek.

Party political offices
Preceded by John Banks	Leader of the ACT Party; 2014	Succeeded by David Seymour
