= Regulatory Standards Act 2025 =

Act of Parliament in New Zealand

New Zealand Parliament
- Royal assent: 18 November 2025
- Commenced: 1 January 2026

Legislative history
- Bill title: Regulatory Standards Bill
- Introduced by: David Seymour
- Introduced: 19 May 2025
- Committee responsible: Finance and Expenditure Committee
- First reading: 22 May 2025
- Voting summary: 68 voted for; 55 voted against
- Second reading: 4 November 2025
- Voting summary: 68 voted for; 55 voted against
- Third reading: 13 November 2025
- Voting summary: 68 voted for; 55 voted against
- Status: Current legislation

The Regulatory Standards Act 2025 is an Act of Parliament in New Zealand establishing a set of principles to guide the development of laws and regulations, being part of the Sixth National Government coalition agreement between the ACT and National parties.

A discussion document was published for public feedback on the bill's goals and provisions from November 2024 to January 2025. Many critics of the proposition were primarily concerned with how it could affect environmental regulation, weaken Treaty of Waitangi protections, and advance a libertarian, neoliberal agenda.

Having been formally introduced to Parliament, the bill passed its first reading in May 2025. It went to the Finance and Expenditure select committee, then returned to the House. It passed both its second and third readings in November 2025 and received royal assent shortly thereafter.

== Key provisions ==
The Regulatory Standards Act establishes principles to direct the development of regulations and legislation, which concern the rule of law, the role of the courts, personal liberties, property rights, taxation, fees, levies, law-making practices (referred to as "good law-making"), and regulatory oversight. It intends to promote clear legislation and to reinforce the principles of equality before the law, judicial independence, and impartiality, hopefully avoiding retrospective effects on rights, liberties, freedoms, and obligations.

Some proposed mechanisms by which these goals may be achieved are ensuring that legislation: (1) is not used for the purposes of taking possession of property without the owner's consent, unless the justification aligns with principles of sound justification, and fair compensation is provided; (2) produces economic benefits exceeding the costs of implementation; (3) is consistent with the principles, or that any inconsistencies are identified.

== Background ==
The concept of the Regulatory Standards Bill originated from the "Constraining Government Regulation" report, published in 2001 by the New Zealand Business Roundtable (which has since been revamped as the New Zealand Initiative). The report's author, New Zealand Initiative senior research fellow Bryce Wilkinson, said he was influenced by the economic, fiscal and regulatory challenges that the Fourth Labour Government faced upon coming into power after the 1984 general election.

Regulatory standards bills have been introduced to the New Zealand Parliament three times previously. In 2006, ACT leader Rodney Hide introduced the Regulatory Responsibility Bill as a member's bill. In 2011, the Regulatory Standards Bill was introduced on the recommendation of the Regulatory Responsibility Taskforce; the bill was robustly criticised by the New Zealand Treasury and the Regulations Review Committee. Following the 2011 general election, the Fifth National Government abandoned plans to progress the bill, but the ACT and National parties agreed to work on an alternative bill based on Treasury's recommendations. In 2021, ACT leader David Seymour introduced a Regulatory Standards Bill to codify "good regulatory analysis" on the basis of protecting New Zealand's liberties, but it did not pass the first reading.

Following the 2023 general election, a coalition agreement between the National and ACT parties committed them to introducing a Regulatory Standards Act, which was purported to improve the quality of regulation and ensure that regulatory decisions were based on "good law-making" and "economic efficiency." On 12 September 2024, the Ministry for Regulation confirmed that passing the Regulatory Standards Bill was one of its five main priorities. The Ministry was also advising on the development of the legislation.

== Discussion document and consultation ==
In 19 November 2024, public consultation opened on a discussion document regarding the Regulatory Standards Bill. Seymour said that the proposed legislation "would bring the same 'level of discipline' to regulation that the Public Finance Act brings to public spending." Under this legal framework, the Ministry for Regulation would be tasked with administering the Regulatory Standards legislation.

The discussion document included a set of principles intended to guide responsible regulation, covering topics such as the rule of law, the courts' role, personal liberties, property rights, taxation, fees, levies, law-making practices, and regulatory oversight. There was also a proposed mechanism for assessing whether future regulatory proposals were consistent with these principles. The 2025 revision, unlike the one in 2021, proposed the establishment of a Regulatory Standards Board to manage concerns relating to existing legislation being inconsistent with the principles in the Bill. The Board would consist of Members appointed by the Ministry for Regulation and would be able to formulate non-binding recommendations to Ministers.

There were almost 23,000 submissions on the discussion document, with 80% being in the final four days of the consultation period, which ended at 11:59 pm on 13 January 2025. The Ministry for Regulation estimated that 88 percent of submissions opposed the proposed regulations, while 0.33 percent fully and partially supported them. In an early June 2025 interview, Seymour claimed that 99.5 percent of submissions were created using "bots."

== Legislative history ==
=== First reading ===
On 7 May 2025, Minister for Regulation David Seymour confirmed that the New Zealand Cabinet had approved a detailed proposal for the Regulatory Standards Bill. The bill was introduced into the New Zealand Parliament on 19 May.

On 23 May, the Regulation Standards Bill passed its first reading in Parliament with the support of the governing National, ACT and New Zealand First parties. Seymour, the bill's sponsor, described it as "a crucial piece of legislation for improving the long term quality of regulation in our country and ultimately allowing New Zealanders to live longer, happier, healthier and wealthier lives." Te Pāti Māori co-leader Debbie Ngarewa-Packer opposed the bill, saying it "promotes equal treatment before the law but it opens the door [for] government to attack every Māori equity initiative."

=== Select committee stage ===
==== Public submissions ====
Following its first reading, Parliament sought public submissions on the bill, which concluded on 23 June 2025. The Finance and Expenditure Committee considered the submissions, with its final report due on 22 November 2025. Oral submissions on the Regulatory Standards Bill began on 7 July 2025. During the first day, the Finance and Expenditure Committee heard oral submissions from former Prime Minister Geoffrey Palmer, Iwi Chairs Forum representative Rahui Papa, Māori Law Society representative Natalie Coates, representatives of the Dunedin City Council and Horizons Regional Council, the Māori Women's Welfare League, Transpower and former Green Party MP Darleen Tana. These submitters criticised the Bill as unnecessary, hostile to regulatory legislation and the Treaty of Waitangi. Transpower expressed concern that the legislation could force power utility companies to compensate home and landowners affected by infrastructural projects. University of Auckland economist Professor Ananish Chaudhuri said the Bill safeguarded individual and property rights and disputed claims that it would allow companies to sue for lost business. The bill's sponsor Seymour defended the Bill, arguing that it would eliminate red tape and questioned the need to refer to the Treaty of Waitangi within the bill, which he argued would ensure that the Government would make laws carefully and was accountable to New Zealanders.

On 8 July, the Finance and Expenditure select committee heard submissions from various individuals and groups. Submitters supporting the Regulatory Standards Bill included the owners of the Bay of Many Coves Resort Limited, the Business NZ advocacy group, retired Judge David Harvey, and the New Zealand Taxpayers' Union. These argued that it would protect property rights, improve the quality of regulation, combat poor regulations and introduce the concept of "good lawmaking." Harvey suggested that the Bill include a reference to the Treaty of Waitangi because it involved elements of governance and "equal application of the law." Submitters opposing the bill included lawyer Tania Waikato, the New Zealand Council of Trade Unions (NZCTU), the New Zealand Law Society, Te Kura Kaupapa Māori o Ngā Mokopuna, University of Auckland emeritus law professor Jane Kelsey, Māori data scientist Kirikowhai Mikaere and former ACT MP Donna Awatere Huata. These argued that the bill would undermine the Treaty of Waitangi, Māori-Crown relations, impose libertarian beliefs about individualism and property rights into New Zealand's constitutional framework, had inherent flaws, and allow companies to seek compensation for regulation affecting their business operations.

On 9 July, the Finance and Expenditure select committee heard submissions from the Parliamentary Commissioner for the Environment, the Deputy Clerk of the House of Representatives, the Rail and Maritime Union, the Public Service Association, former MPs Jan Logie and Marian Hobbs, and Victoria University of Wellington law professor Dean Knight. Knight expressed concern that the Regulatory Standards Bill would incentivise certain kinds of laws and discourage others. On 10 July, the committee heard submissions from protest group Toitū te Tiriti spokesperson Eru Kapa-Kingi, the New Zealand Initiative's Dr Bryce Wilkinson and chief economist Eric Crampton, the Manukau Urban Māori Authority and several health experts. Kapa-Kingi claimed the bill would have an adverse impact on all legislation and tangata whenua. Crampton argued that the costs of beneficial public purpose should fall on the beneficiaries while Wilkinson sought several changes to ensure legal expertise on the regulatory board, a public interest test for takings, full compensation, strengthening "rule of law protections," and applying the legislation to local councils.

==== Final report ====
On 10 October 2025, the select committee released its final report on the Regulatory Standards Bill, recommending that it progress further with several amendments. These included providing compensation only in "severe cases," clarifying that principles not included in the law such as the Treaty of Waitangi could be considered relevant in some cases of lawmaking, excluding the Marine and Coastal Area legislation and Treaty settlements, delaying the establishment of a Regulatory Standards Board (RSB) until the Ministry for Regulation provides benchmark "consistency accountancy" statements in mid-2026, that the RSB and its chair be appointed by the Governor-General of New Zealand at the advice of the Minister for Regulation, raising board members' terms from three to five years in line with the Crown Entities Act, and clarifying the board's independence.

While the government coalition parties supported the legislation, the opposition Labour and Green parties opposed the Regulatory Standards Bill on the grounds that 98.7% of public submissions opposed the bill, that it clashed with the Treaty of Waitangi, and that the bills favoured corporate interests over collective interests, undermined environmental regulation and climate mitigation, and constricted the public service in carrying out their obligations. They along with Te Pāti Māori committed to repealing the legislation if they formed the next government.

==== Second reading ====
On 4 November 2025, the Regulatory Standards Bill passed its second reading along party lines; with the National, ACT and NZ First parties voting in favour and the Labour, Green and Māori parties opposing the bill. The bill's sponsor Regulations Minister Seymour argued that the bill would make lawmaking more "transparent, principled, and accountable" and build public confidence in the Parliamentary system. Labour's Regulation spokesperson Duncan Webb opposed the bill, describing it as a "bad piece of law" that entrenched private property rights in the legislative process. Green co-leader Chlöe Swarbrick criticised the Government for not conducting targeted consultation for Māori and said it would deprioritise the Treaty of Waitangi. Green MP Francisco Hernandez said the bill would create an "avalanche of yellow tape" for the public service.

==== Third reading ====
On 13 November, the Regulatory Standards Bill passed its third reading along party lines, with the National, Act and NZ First parties voting in favour and the Labour, Green and Māori parties opposing the bill. The bill's sponsor Seymour argued that the legislation would avoid putting the cost of law changes on ordinary people and would ensure transparency in the lawmaking process. National Party MP Cameron Brewer congratulated the ACT party for its 20-year effort to pass the bill into law and highlighted the amendments made during the select committee process. Fellow National MP and Minister for Māori Development Tama Potaka reiterated National's support for the bill as part of his party's coalition agreement with ACT. The NZ First party supported the legislation despite party leader Winston Peters and deputy leader Shane Jones indicating it needed further amendments to meet "good governance" standards." NZ First MP Casey Costello argued the bill would promote accountability, open government, efficiency in regulation, the rule of law, property rights, an independent judiciary and equality before the law. Days later however, Peters, her party leader, said their party had always been opposed to the bill and vowed to repeal the act, saying Costello had spoken without consulting him.

Labour's justice spokesperson Duncan Webb criticised the Bill for incorporating libertarian principles into the legislative process. He said that a future Labour government would repeal the bill within 100 days and highlighted the high number of public submissions opposing the bill. Green MP Tamatha Paul likened the bill to a cockroach, describing as an "ideological project" that had been rejected by New Zealanders. She also said that it erased the Treaty of Waitangi and prioritised corporate interests over the environment and people. Similarly, Te Pāti Māori leader Rawiri Waititi denounced the bill as an attack on the Treaty of Waitangi, describing it as an "arson on constitutional protections."

== Implementation ==
On 20 April 2026, Seymour announced the appointment of the inaugural members of the Regulatory Standards Board: Manawa Energy Limited chair Paul Ridley-Smith (chairman), P3604 Timber Framed Buildings Review Committee member Ian Chamberlain, Taumata Arowai director Julie Hardaker, University of Auckland economist Dr Ananish Chaudhuri, former Electricity Authority CEO Carl Hansen and University of Otago psychologist Dr Nicola Swain.

== Responses ==
=== Support ===
Bryce Wilkinson of the New Zealand Initiative (formerly the New Zealand Business Roundtable), who had worked on an earlier version of the regulatory standards legislation, said that "economists believed good quality regulation was where the 'benefits to people who are affected by it exceed the costs to people who are affected by it'."

=== Criticism ===
In June 2025, Seymour posted several social media posts accusing critics of the bill of being deranged. These critics included Mayor of Wellington Tory Whanau, Labour MP Willie Jackson, academics Dame Anne Salmond, George Laking, and Metiria Turei. In response, Whanau accused Seymour of breaching the Cabinet Manual and said she would lodge a complaint with the Prime Minister. Similarly, Salmond described Seymour's posts as an abuse of "high office" and said she would lodge a complaint with the New Zealand Cabinet Office. Seymour defended the posts and accused his critics of making "incorrect statements."

==== Academia ====
University of Auckland emeritus professor of law Jane Kelsey opposed the bill on the grounds that it would undermine the Treaty of Waitangi and undermine regulation, in favour of profit. Kelsey also said that the bill reflected the ACT Party's prioritisation of private property rights over the Treaty and other socio-economic factors.

University of Otago senior psychology lecturer Ryan Ward argued that the bill would give companies more rights than members of the public, potentially allowing corporations to seek financial compensation from Māori groups for any loss to profit from government legislation protecting environmental and indigenous land claims.

In mid October 2025, Victoria University of Wellington law professor Dean Knight described the bill as a "dogmatic project designed to politically skew the process of lawmaking, rather than being a genuine attempt to improve the quality of legislation and regulation or usher in a new constitutional framework for good law making." Similarly, University of Otago law professor expressed concern that a future government consisting of opposition parties would repeal the Regulatory Standards Bill.

==== Environmental groups ====
In mid-January 2025, the Environmental Defence Society (EDS) published a submission opposing the proposed Regulatory Standards Bill, stating that it "constitutes a retrograde constitutional shift by mandating a narrow, ideological and radical approach to regulation-making." The EDS also said that the legislation could undermine environmental protection and expressed concern that the government was reviewing all environmental regulations. Similarly, environmental researcher and cross-cultural consultant Melanie Nelson claimed that the proposed bill lacked a "democratic mandate for constitutional changes of this magnitude."

In mid-June 2025, Greenpeace Aotearoa New Zealand opposed the bill on the grounds that it would enshrine several ACT party principles, including forcing governments to compensate corporations for environmental rules and regulations affecting their property, excluded the Treaty of Waitangi, and prioritised corporate property and individual freedom over environmental protection, public safety, and indigenous rights. Greenpeace encouraged their supporters to send submissions during the select committee stage.

==== Māori ====
In mid-December 2024, Māori language educator, consultant, podcaster and writer Melanie Nelson described the proposed Regulatory Standards Bill and companion Treaty Principles Bill as part of a broader effort by the ACT party to impose its ideology on New Zealand's legal framework, with implications for the Treaty of Waitangi and climate change mitigation. On 18 May, Nelson followed up with a second op-ed article arguing that the proposed legislation would strengthen the powers of the New Zealand Cabinet and could be used to undermine the Treaty of Waitangi claims and settlements.

The Māori group Toitū te Tiriti, which organised the Hīkoi mō te Tiriti (March for the Treaty), opposed the bill, claiming it would undermine the Treaty of Waitangi and would discriminate against Māori. They encouraged supporters to send submissions opposing the bill. On 29 January 2025 Toitū te Tiriti filed an urgent Waitangi Tribunal claim, arguing that the proposed legislation would undermine the Treaty of Waitangi and adversely affect Māori. On 15 May 2025, the Tribunal heard submissions from lawyers representing 18,000 New Zealanders opposed to the bill. On 16 May, the Tribunal released an interim report urging the Crown to halt work on the bill, to facilitate "meaningful consultation" with Māori.

==== Political parties ====
While the populist New Zealand First party had supported the Regulatory Standards Bill's legislative passage in 2025, its leader Winston Peters subsequently announced on 20 November that his party would repeal the legislation if re-elected in 2025. Peters said that NZ First had opposed the Bill but had reluctantly supported it due to ACT's coalition agreement with National. In response, ACT leader David Seymour accused Peters of acting in bad faith and seeking to form a coalition with the opposition Labour Party.

On 25 November, Labour MP Duncan Webb lodged a member's bill to repeal the Regulatory Standards Act. On 26 November, National Party deputy leader Nicola Willis suggested that her party could join NZ First in campaigning to repeal the Regulatory Standards Act during the 2026 New Zealand general election.

==== Trade unions ====
The trade union E tū opposed the bill on the grounds that it allowed corporations to claim compensation for laws affecting their profits, accorded individual rights to corporations, undermined Māori protections and input and shifted parliamentary power into the hands of a minister-appointed board.

==== International ====
In June 2025, the United Nations Special Rapporteur on the Rights of Indigenous Peoples Albert Kwokwo Barume wrote a letter to the New Zealand Government raising concerns about several policies affecting indigenous people including the Regulatory Standards Bill. Barume said that the legislation risked undermining the Government's Treaty of Waitangi obligations and sidelining Māori. In mid July 2025, Seymour wrote a letter dismissing the United Nations' concerns as "insane." In response, Prime Minister Luxon and Foreign Minister Peters reprimanded Seymour for writing a reply without consulting with his Cabinet colleagues. Following a meeting with Luxon, Seymour agreed to rescind his letter and allow Peters to draft an official response to Barume's letter.
