= Kapa-Kingi =

Kapa-Kingi is a double-barrelled surname. Notable people with the surname include:

- Eru Kapa-Kingi (born 1996), New Zealand Māori activist
- Mariameno Kapa-Kingi (born 1960 or 1961), New Zealand politician
