= New Zealand Productivity Commission =

Independent Crown entity based in Wellington, New Zealand

- Te Komihana Whai Hua o Aotearoa

Agency overview
- Formed: 2011
- Dissolved: 29 February 2024
- Superseding agency: Ministry for Regulation
- Jurisdiction: New Zealand Government
- Headquarters: Wellington
- Employees: 20
- Annual budget: NZ$5,030,000
- Minister responsible: Nicola Willis, Minister of Finance
- Agency executive: Ganesh Nana, Chair
- Parent agency: Treasury
- Website: www.productivity.govt.nz

The New Zealand Productivity Commission (Te Kōmihana Whai Hua o Aotearoa) was an independent Crown entity whose purpose was "to provide advice to the Government on improving productivity in a way that is directed to supporting the overall wellbeing of New Zealanders, having regard to a wide range of communities of interest and population groups in New Zealand society." On 29 February 2024, the commission ceased operations, replaced by the new Ministry for Regulation.

== History ==
=== Formation ===
The New Zealand Productivity Commission Act, passed in December 2010, created the commission as an independent Crown entity. It was established as a condition of the ACT Party supporting the National Party government on confidence and supply, with Minister of Finance Bill English describing it as working "closely with and be closely modelled on" the Australian Productivity Commission.

The commission began operating on 1 April 2011. Throughout its history, the commission's main function was to advise the Government about improving productivity that was related to supporting the well-being of New Zealanders including different interest and population groups. The commission's purview included the entire New Zealand economy, but was tasked with producing regular reports on efficiency, effectiveness and service delivery in government agencies. It work focused on undertaking in-depth inquiries on behalf of the New Zealand Government, carrying out productivity-related research with the goal of boosting productivity, and promoting understanding of productivity issues.

English and ACT leader Rodney Hide appointed Murray Sherwin as the commission's first chair. Under Sherwin's leadership, the commission conducted research into urban planning, housing and land use, which helped build bipartisan consensus around supply being a key contributing factor to New Zealand's housing shortage. The Commission's research also contributed to improving the Auckland Unitary Plan.

=== Ganesh Nana's leadership, 2020–2024 ===
Sherwin served until 2020 when he was succeeded by Ganesh Nana, who was appointed by Finance Minister Grant Robertson. The commission's mandate was subsequently widened to include relevant social issues including persistent social disadvantage and to engage with a wide range of people. Nana was perceived as being close to the-then incumbent Labour Party, with his former firm economic consultancy BERL having costed Labour's policy programme for the 2017 New Zealand general election.

As chair of the Productivity Commission, Nana attracted criticism from several elements including centre-right think tanks such as the New Zealand Initiative, some former commission staff, economists, and ACT leader David Seymour. Former Reserve Bank official and centre-right commentator Michael Reddell alleged that Nana and other commission staff were vocally left-wing and disinterested in productivity. Similar criticism was echoed by the NZ Initiative's economist Eric Crampton who claimed that the commission under Nana's leadership's focus had shifted from economic issues to social disadvantage, which he considered to be the purview of the Ministry of Social Development. Nana disputed allegations of political bias and argued that these criticisms were rooted in differing economic perspectives. He argued that economic issues and social outcomes were linked. Massey University Sociologist Paul Spoonley has defended the commission's work, arguing that it was not rooted in ideology.

=== Dissolution ===
In December 2023, the new National-led coalition government announced that it would dissolve the Productivity Commission. On 30 January 2024, the Minister for Regulation David Seymour introduced urgent legislation to disestablish the commission. Seymour stated that funding previously allocated to the commission would be redirected to the new Ministry for Regulation, which would be tasked with assessing the quality of existing and new regulation.

The Productivity Commission ceased operations on 29 February 2024, with its functions being assumed by the new Ministry for Regulation. Its closure let to the retrenchment of 22 staff members, none of whom were redeployed. Nana criticised the Government's rapid dissolution of the commission, describing it as "cruel and thoughtless."

On 16 May, The New Zealand Herald reported that the Government had spent a total of NZ$339,000 on redundancy payments to Productivity Commission employees, citing figures released by the New Zealand Treasury under the Official Information Act.
