= Kassie Hartendorp =

New Zealand community organiser

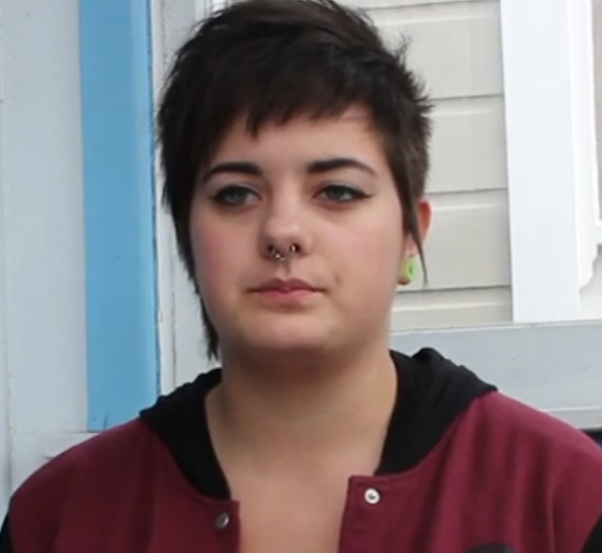
- In a 2012 video supporting marriage equality
- Citizenship: New Zealand
- Education: Ahunga Tikanga
- Alma mater: Te Wānanga o Raukawa
- Occupation: Director at ActionStation
- Known for: Activism and advocacy

Kassie Hartendorp is a community worker, activist and advocate for anti-racism, LGBTQI+ and takatāpui support, workers rights and Te Tiriti o Waitangi education. She is the director of ActionStation Aotearoa, a New Zealand community campaigning organisation.

== Upbringing and education ==
Hartendorp grew up first in Upper Hutt, Wellington, and then Whanganui from age 8. She was born in the late 1980s. Hartendorp is Māori affiliating to the nation Ngāti Raukawa. She was adopted and her adoptive parents are English and Dutch, her biological father is Italian, Scottish and English and her biological mother is from Ngāti Raukawa. She met her biological parents when she was 14.

Hartendorp went to Victoria University of Wellington, and while there spent some time in socialist groups. She also attended Te Wānanga o Raukawa in Ōtaki and studied Ahunga Tikanga (Māori Laws and Philosophy).

== Career and advocacy ==
In Wellington Hartendorp was a youth worker which included mentoring and running groups. She is involved with and supports a LGBTQI+ community and is a member of the Tīwhanawhana Trust, a takatāpui group (a Māori language word often translated as LQBTQI+). Hartendorp became a member of the Kava Club who were a group of Māori and Pasifika New Zealander creative people, and BOX Oceania. BOX Oceania was "a collective that fosters community and support for queer, trans, intersex, indigenous people of colour".

Hartendorp has been a supporting member of Fightback, a socialist organisation, and in 2016 edited a youth issue of a Fightback publication. Hartendorp has supported the left-wing think tank project Economic and Social Research Aotearoa (ESRA). She has worked for an Equal Pay campaign and was the Community Organiser at campaigning organisation, ActionStation. As an advocate and writer she has articles published in The Spinoff, Pantograph Punch, Vice and eTangata (an online Sunday magazine run by the Mana Trust. She was editor of The Aunties Magazine, a one-off publication about political organising by women in New Zealand. Hartendorp has been outspoken in her support of people who identity in the LGBTQI+, takatāpui or queer communities. Hartendorp says:

We can respect the essence of another person in their wholeness, or dehumanise them. One path leads to a strong, vibrant, enriched manifestation of whakapapa, one results in rigid roles that do not reflect our lived realities, causing stigma and isolation.

Hartendorp taught a Te Tiriti o Waitangi education workshop along with Treaty Educator Moea Armstrong from Network Waitangi in the lead up to the introduction of the Treaty Principles Bill. In 2025 Hartendorp appeared on a panel on Māori current affairs TV show The Hui alongside Ella Henry, (Auckland University of Technology), Matt Roskruge, (economics professor, Massey University) discussing the win over the Treaty Principles Bill in parliament after ActionStations were part of campaigns. Hartendorp is based in Wellington and became the director of ActionStation in 2020.
