= Eru Kapa-Kingi =

New Zealand Māori activist (born 1996)

- Born: 1996 (age 29–30); Whangārei, New Zealand
- Education: LLB (Hons)
- Alma mater: Victoria University of Wellington
- Occupations: Activist; law teacher
- Organization: Toitū Te Tiriti
- Known for: Hīkoi mō te Tiriti
- Mother: Mariameno Kapa-Kingi

Eru Kapa-Kingi (born 1996) is a New Zealand Māori activist. He rose to prominence as a leading figure of the Hīkoi mō te Tiriti protests in 2024.

== Personal life and education ==
He was born to Mariameno Kapa-Kingi (his mother; a current member of Parliament), and Korotangi Kapa-Kingi (his father; a master carver who taught Māori arts at Te Wānanga o Aotearoa). He grew up in Whangārei as one of three triplets. He studied law at Victoria University of Wellington, graduating with first-class honours. He is also a graduate of Te Panekiretanga o te Reo Māori.

From his mother's side his whakapapa includes Te Aupōuri iwi, as well as Tahaawai and Ngāpuhi iwi. From his father's side he also has connections to Ngāitai, Te Whānau-ā-Apanui, and Waikato iwi.

== Career ==
Kapa-Kingi is a teaching fellow of law at the University of Auckland.

=== Politics and activism ===
Kapa-Kingi was on Te Pāti Māori's list during the 2023 New Zealand general election. He also served as the party's vice-president until 24 March 2025 when he resigned due to disagreements with the party's president John Tamihere.

Kapa-Kingi was the most recognisable face of the Hīkoi mō te Tiriti protests. He addressed the crowds in front of parliament, saying "Today, the Māori nation has been born...". He is a part of what has been described as "the kōhanga generation" of young Māori leaders. Kapa-Kingi led the Toitū Te Tiriti movement, which was affiliated with Te Pāti Māori. He gave an oral submission on the Treaty Principles Bill at a parliamentary select committee in February 2025, starting by calling the process "he moumou taima" (a waste of time).

On 2 October 2025, Kapa-Kingi announced that the Toitū Te Tiriti movement, which had organised the 2024 Hīkoi mō te Tiriti protests, would formally sever its relations with Te Pāti Māori, citing concerns about bullying, an alleged "dictatorial leadership structure," a clash of values, and the need for independence. In response, Te Pāti Māori rejected allegations of bullying and dictatorial rule, and insisted that its decision-making process was transparent and in accordance with its constitution. On 14 October, Te Pāti Māori circulated an email containing several allegations against Kapa-Kingi and his mother, TPM Member of Parliament Mariameno Kapa-Kingi, who had been demoted from her position of party whip in September 2025. The email included a letter from Parliamentary Services alleging that Kapa-Kingi had tried to skip security checks at the New Zealand Parliament and racially abused a security guard on Budget Day in 2024. In response to the allegations, Kapa-Kingi issued an Instagram post stating: "I joined Te Pāti Māori as a young, passionate man with the belief I could help create a better world for our people. Instead, I learnt a long and hard lesson - power can truly corrupt people you once looked up to..." Kapa-Kingi also defended his and his mother's integrity and commitment to their people.

After Te Pāti Māori president Tamihere called on Mariameno Kapa-Kingi and fellow MP Tākuta Ferris to resign from the party in early November 2025, Kapa-Kingi criticised the party leadership particularly Tamihere, accusing him of character assassination and questioning his suitability to lead the party. On 9 November, the party's national council voted to expel both Mariameno Kapa-Kingi and Ferris, with the two MPs denouncing the decision as unconstitutional and stating they would challenge it.

On 31 January 2026, Kapa-Kingi's Toitū te Aroha movement held a march on Queen Street in Central Auckland that was attended by hundreds of supporters including members of the Sikh community. Kapa-Kingi also led a haka at the end of the march.

During Waitangi Day on 5 February 2026, Kapa-Kingi used his whaikōrero (speech) to question the presence of political parties and the New Zealand Crown on the Waitangi Treaty grounds, and urged Te Pāti Māori to resolve its differences. In response, the party's co-leader Rawiri Waititi delivered an address, which Kapa-Kingi regarded as a "half-pai apology." Waititi's wife Kiri Tamihere-Waititi delivered a haka in challenge, which Kapa-Kingi later said he regarded as a spiritual attack on himself and his family. Kapa-Kingi said the confrontation destroyed all hope of reconciliation with Te Pāti Māori and that he could no longer support them.
