= Hīkoi mō te Tiriti =

Hīkoi protesting the Treaty Principles Bill

- Part of Māori protest movement and protests against David Seymour
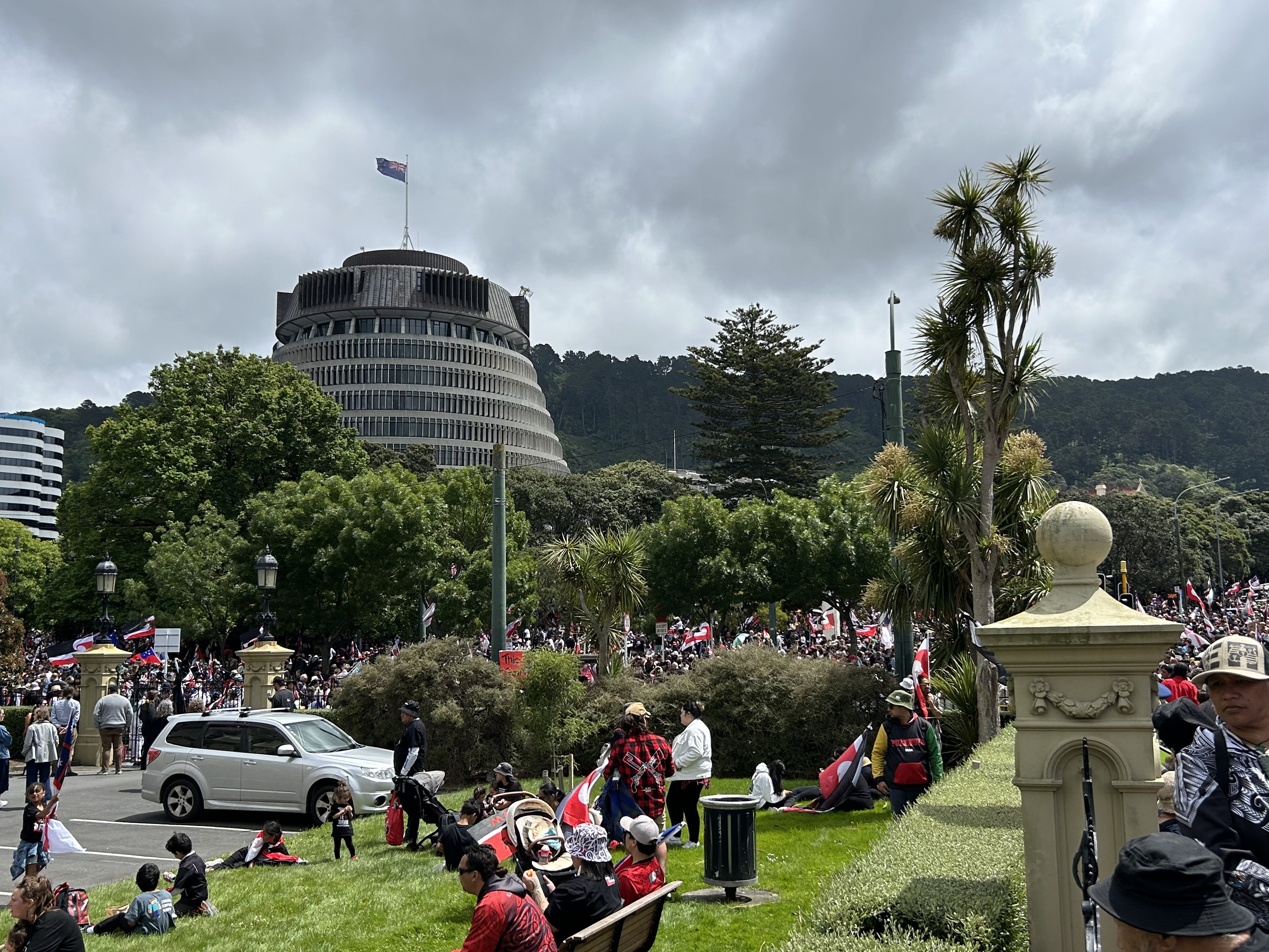
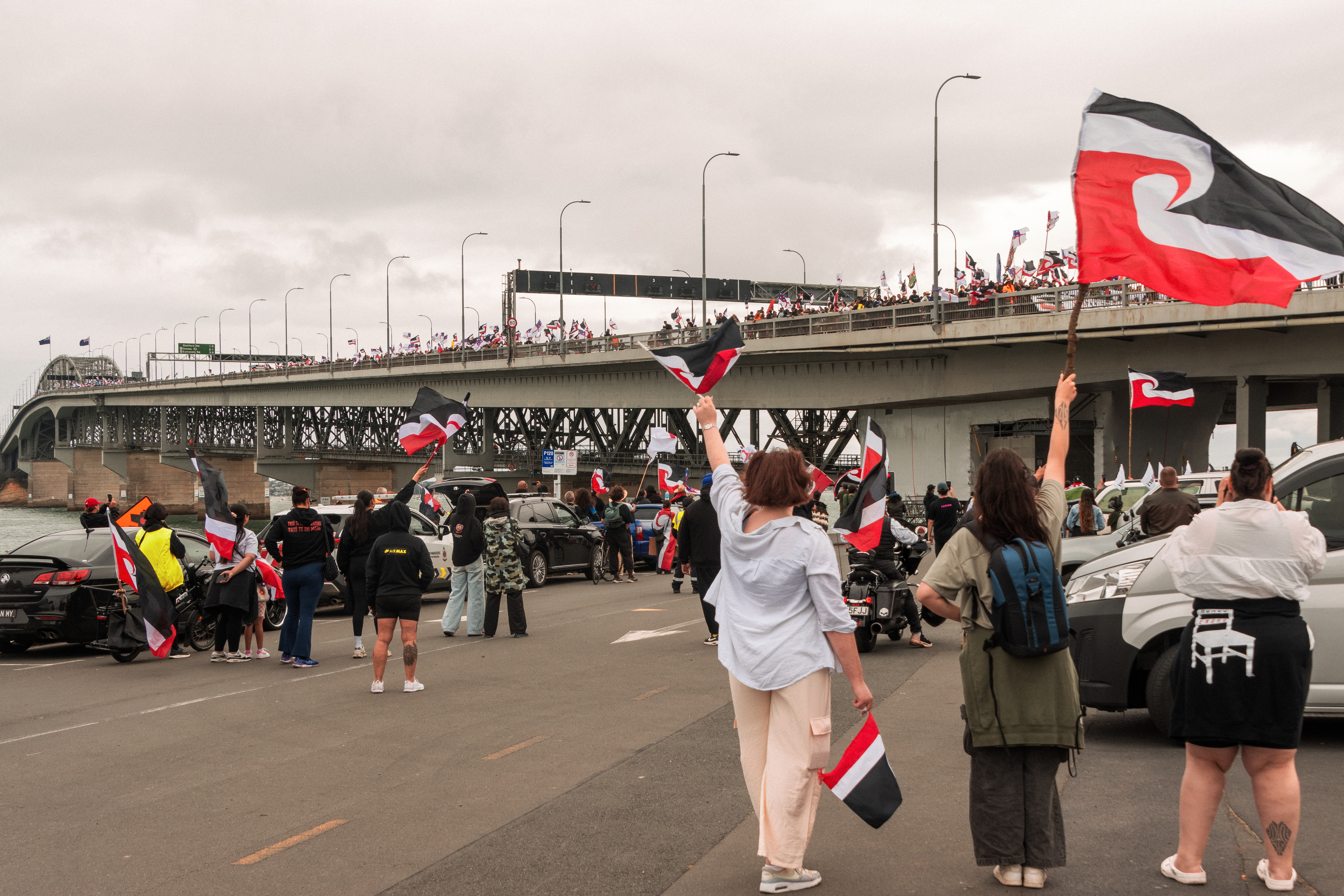
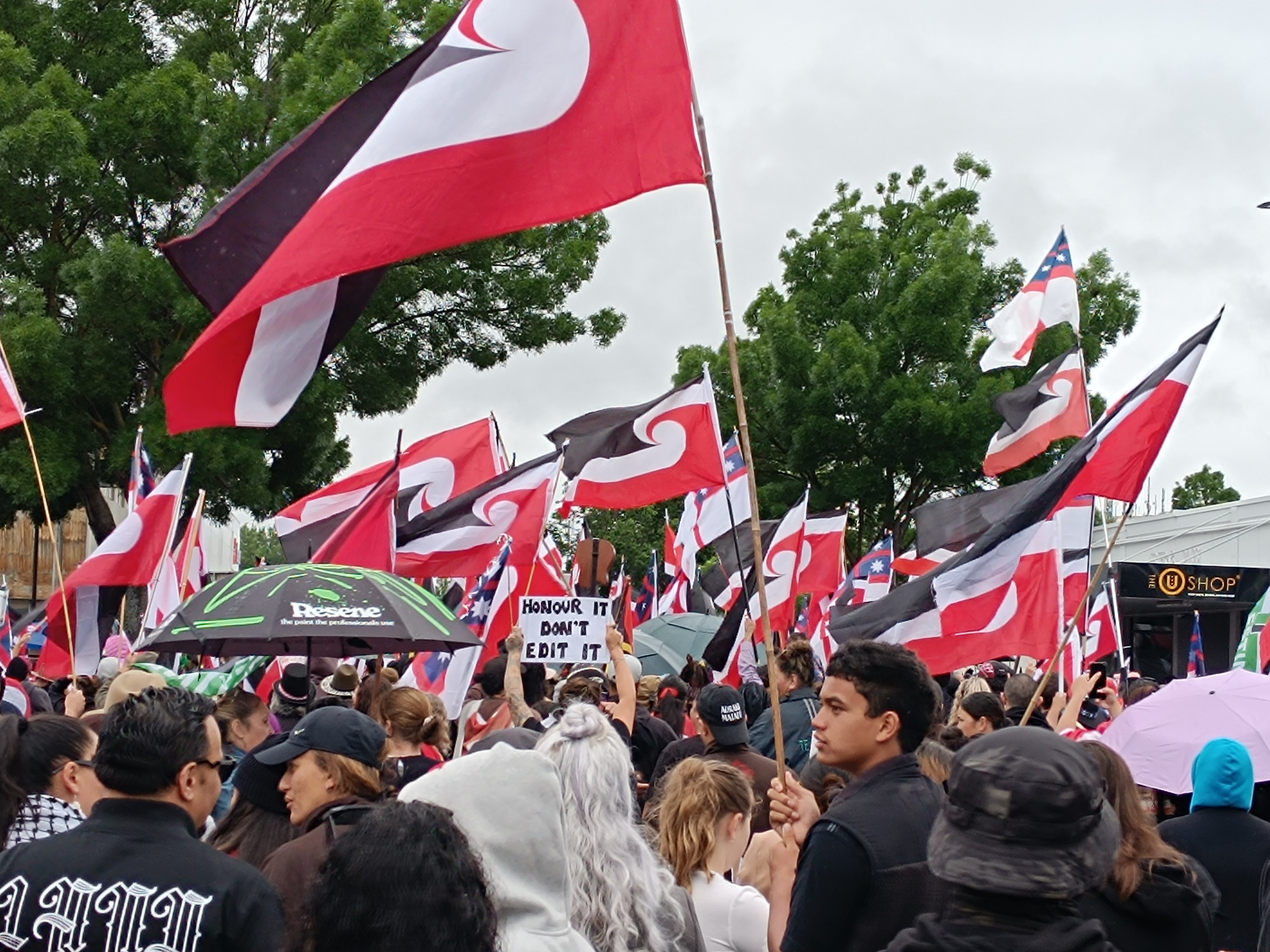
- Crowds surrounding the Beehive, the executive wing of Parliament The march across Auckland Harbour Bridge Marchers in Hastings, North Island
- Date: 10–19 November 2024
- Location: New Zealand (with similar protests in Australia, London, New York City, Hawaii)
- Caused by: Opposition to changes to the principles of the Treaty of Waitangi as put forth in the Treaty Principles Bill
- Methods: Hīkoi marches, demonstration at Parliament House, haka

Lead figures
Eru Kapa-Kingi	

Number
Protesters: >82,000 (Note: Wellington: ~42,000; Rotorua: ~10,000; Hamilton: ~8,000; Auckland: ~5,000; Palmerston North: ~5,000; Hastings: >3,000; Gisborne: ~3,000; Nelson: >2,000; Christchurch: ~2,000; Whangārei: >1,000; Dunedin: ~1,000)	

Hīkoi mō te Tiriti (Māori for 'March for the Treaty') were hīkoi protests in New Zealand against the Treaty Principles Bill that occurred from 10 November to 19 November 2024. The bill would have redefined the principles of the Treaty of Waitangi.

The bill was introduced in November 2024 by the right-wing coalition government as a key policy goal of David Seymour (leader of the libertarian ACT party). Seymour rejected the idea that the Treaty of Waitangi was a partnership between the New Zealand Crown and Māori iwi. He also argued that the original treaty did not sufficiently define the legal rights of New Zealanders, and that this had never been rectified. Seymour is himself of Māori descent.

The bill provoked opposition from several disparate groups, including senior lawyers, opposition parties and supporters of Māori rights. Opponents argue that Māori rights would be eroded and that insufficient consultation took place; proponents say the bill would enshrine equal rights for all New Zealanders regardless of ethnicity. The other two parties in government, National and New Zealand First, have distanced themselves from it. They maintained that they would vote it down at the second reading while Seymour suggested they may support the bill following the select committee process.

Members of Parliament performed a haka in the House of Representatives, which delayed the bill's first reading. The hīkoi took place the same week and traversed the length of the country. By the time it reached the capital, Wellington, over 20,000 people had already marched and around 42,000 people would march in the city. Attending the march in Wellington were politicians, as well as the Māori queen, Nga wai hono i te po.

After a government committee recommended that the bill should not move forward, it was defeated at its second reading by a vote of 112-11, with only the ACT party voting in favor.

== Background ==
The protests were in response to the right-wing coalition National-led Government's Treaty Principles Bill. Following the 2023 election and the formation of a National-led coalition government, ACT launched an information campaign early the following year promoting the bill. The campaign was also intended to counter a leaked Justice Ministry document which claimed that the proposed bill clashed with the text of the Treaty of Waitangi, a 1840 treaty between the Crown and over 500 Māori chiefs which created the New Zealand nation state. Opponents of the bill claim it would remove established rights from Māori citizens.

There is an English and a Māori version of the original treaty, which have differences in translation and meaning. Since 1975, Parliament, courts and the Waitangi Tribunal have looked to the wider intention of the treaty in order to define its principles. The treaty principles are not fixed and are flexible.

ACT and Seymour say the current principles have distorted the original intent of the treaty and created different rights for some New Zealanders, resulting in Māori having different political and legal rights and privileges compared with non-Māori. Seymour states it "provides an opportunity for parliament, rather than the courts, to define the principles of the treaty, including establishing that every person is equal before the law."

The bill passed a preliminary reading during a parliamentary debate described by 1News as "fiery". Māori leaders were disturbed by the fact that the bill was presented a week earlier than had been expected, which they called "dishonourable", and possibly an attempt to pre-empt the national hīkoi. It was also claimed that it demonstrated a culture of New Zealand governments taking unilateral action without Māori consultation. The Treaty Principles Bill would not alter the original Treaty of Waitangi.

Seymour, who has Māori ancestry himself, defended the bill, arguing that it was intended to clarify the constitutional position of Māori as the original treaty had suggested but which had not been defined following the success of the 1975 Māori land march. He also said the earlier than anticipated introduction was a normal process and not a surprise.

ACT's proposed Treaty Principles Bill consists of three articles:

Article 1

The New Zealand Government has the right to govern all New Zealanders.

Māori: Kawanatanga katoa o o ratou whenua.

Article 2

The New Zealand Government will honour all New Zealanders in the chieftainship of their land and all their property.

Māori: Ki nga tangata katoa o Nu Tirani te tino rangatiratanga o o ratou whenua o ratou kainga me o ratou taonga katoa.

Article 3

All New Zealanders are equal under the law with the same rights and duties.

Māori: A ratou nga tikanga katoa rite tahi.

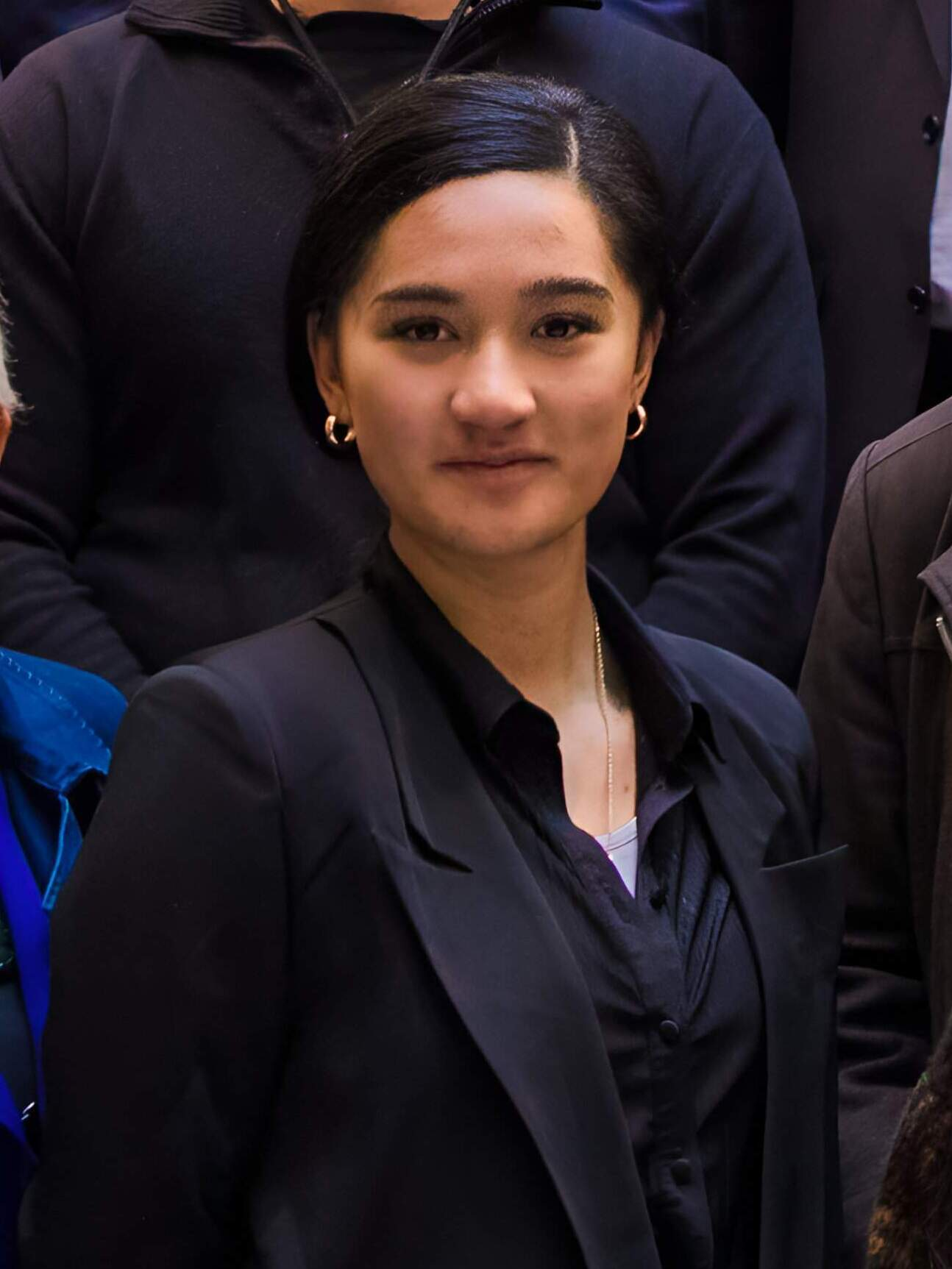
Hana-Rawhiti Maipi-Clarke, MP who tore the bill in half and started a haka in Parliament

The coalition's general policy direct towards Māori was already controversial. Still, the treaty's Principle Bill has focused recent discontent. Māori leaders such as Te Pāti Māori co-leader Debbie Ngarewa-Packer believe the bill is detrimental to the principle of tino rangatiratanga. Early in 2024, the Māori Kīngi, Kīngi Tūheitia, called for a hui ā-motu (unification meeting). While Tūheitia died in August, said National Indigenous Television (NITV), "that message has since reverberated across Aotearoa, with subsequent hui in Heretaunga and Ōtautahi (Christchurch), and a message now championed by the eighth Māori monarch", Tūheitia's daughter and the current queen. Opponents of the bill have argued that it would be effectively "unilaterally changing the meaning of te Tiriti and its effect in law, without the agreement of Māori as the Treaty partner".

Hana-Rawhiti Maipi-Clarke was asked in Parliament to state her party's intended voting position on the bill, and she responded by performing the "Ka Mate" haka in the House of Representatives during the first reading of the bill, delaying its reading. She also tore a draft copy of the bill in two in front of its author, while other opposition MPs and the public gallery joined the haka. Speaker Gerry Brownlee then suspended the House for half an hour and cleared the galleries. This attracted international attention.

A poll conducted in February 2024 showed 36% in support of a referendum on the bill, with 35% opposed, the rest undecided. An October 2024 poll by Curia and commissioned by the Taxpayers' Union found that 45% supported the Treaty Principles Bill, 25% opposed it, and 29% were unsure.

The hīkoi started at Cape Reinga in the far north and Bluff in the far south of New Zealand.

== Northern hīkoi ==
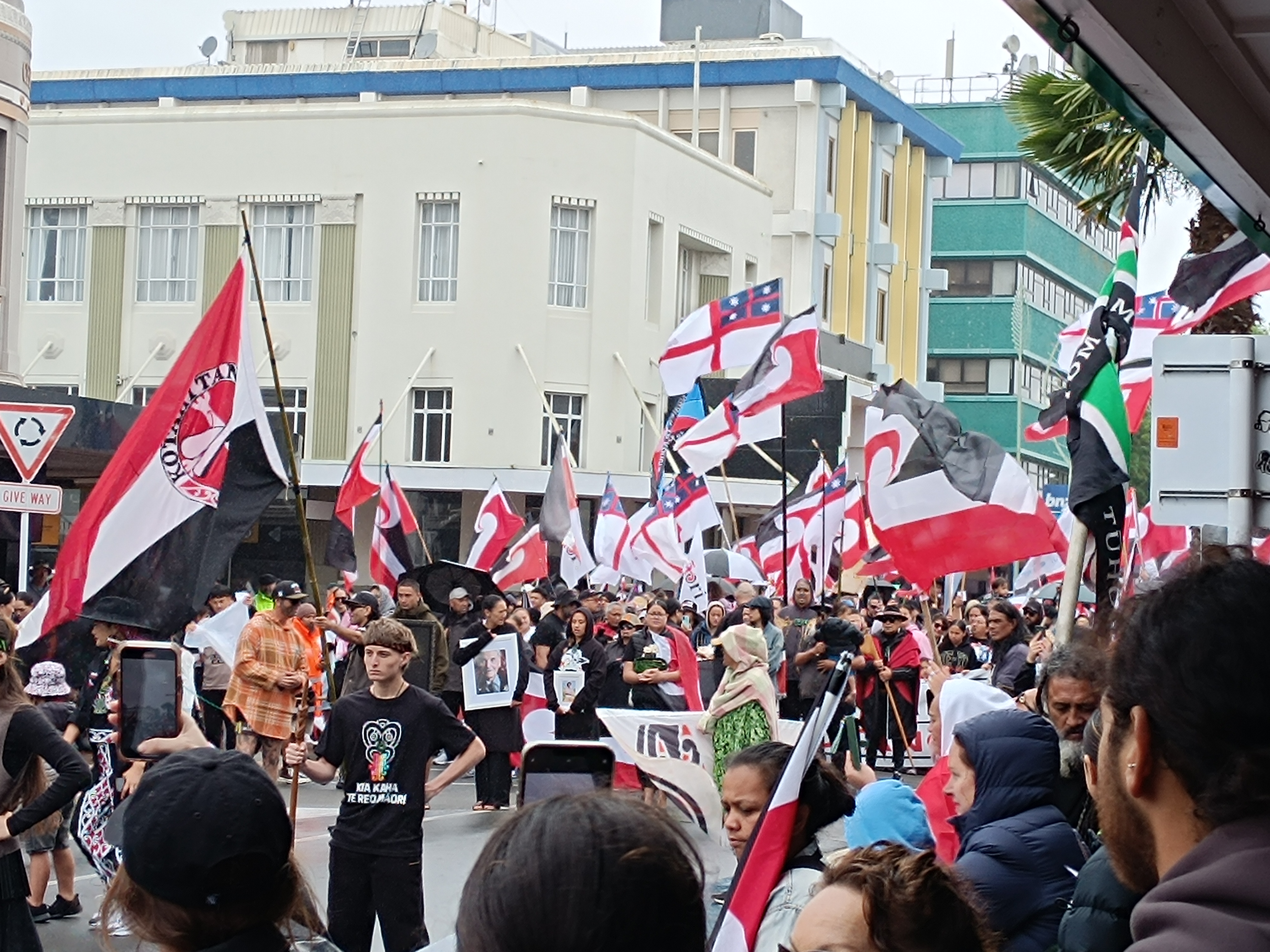
Protestors prepare to walk down Heretaunga Street in Hastings.

=== Northland ===
Kaitaia, Whangārei, Dargaville, and Kawakawa all received the hīkoi. Over 1,000 marched in Whangārei, chanting "We don't want your fast-track, we just want our land back." Both Māori and Pākehā were in the protest. In Laurie Hill Park, the hīkoi had picked up several thousand people, and the crowd was jubilant. Ngātiwai iwi provided food. Eru Kapa-Kingi gave a speech, saying "Why would we speak to ears that would not listen; why would we speak to minds that would not change; why would we speak to a power structure that never should've happened?"

=== Auckland ===
Starting in Onepoto Domain in Northcote, an estimated 5,000 protestors crossed the Auckland Harbour Bridge in the morning of 13 November. Two northbound lanes on the bridge were closed to accommodate the marchers. It was reported that the bridge swayed with the rhythm of the marchers. The hīkoi later stopped at Bastion Point and Ihumātao. Green MP Hūhana Lyndon was with the hīkoi.

=== Waikato ===
The main North Island hīkoi ended its third day in Rangiriri, with about 400 people in the convoy at that point. On 14 November, the hīkoi marched on Hamilton, the main centre in the Waikato region and the heart of the Kīngitanga. More than 6,000 people marched down Victoria Street, with an additional 2,000 to 3,000 joining at Garden Place. Hana-Rawhiti Maipi-Clarke gave a speech at the gathering.

=== Bay of Plenty ===
Around 10,000 people marched through Rotorua on 15 November 2024 in heavy rain. Well-known activist Tāme Iti joined the crowd, and Te Pāti Māori co-leader Rawiri Waititi gave a speech.

=== Gisborne ===
A secondary hīkoi set off from the top of East Cape in Potaka, making its way down State Highway 35 to eventually meet up with the main convoy in Hastings. In Gisborne, a diverse group of about 3,000 showed out on 14 November 2024. They then marched across the Gladstone Rd bridge, down Wainui Rd and on to London St, then going along Ranfurly St and ending at the Te Poho o Rawiri Marae. Derek Lardelli and former MP Meka Whaitiri appeared at the hīkoi. The hīkoi then left for Hastings.

=== Hawke's Bay ===
People watched from the roadside as the main convoy entered Hawke's Bay, with a local store selling out of Māori flags. Over 3,000 people marched in the streets of Hastings on a rainy 16 November. The march started in the city's Central Plaza, walked down Heretaunga Street, and ended in the city's Civic Square.

=== Manawatū-Whanganui ===
The Square, Palmerston North's civic plaza, "burst at the seams" with around 5,000 people attending the rally held there on 17 November. Deputy mayor Debi Marshall-Lobb spoke to the crowd and voiced the city council's support for the hīkoi. The hīkoi's next stop was Levin.

== Southern hīkoi ==
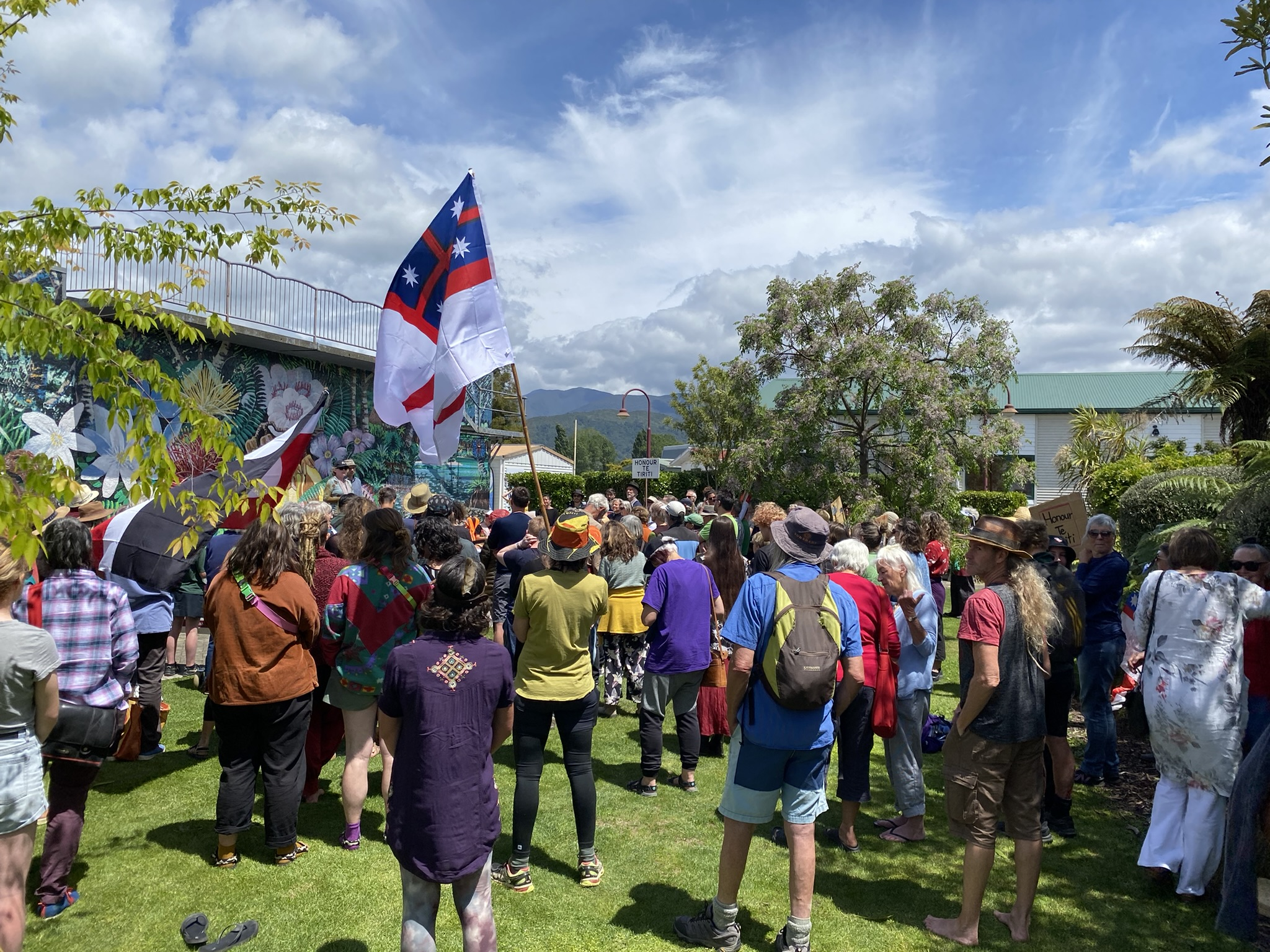
Toitū Te Tiriti protest in Tākaka

=== Southland ===
The southern hīkoi began in Bluff. Hundreds marched in Invercargill against the bill. Te Pāti Māori MP and MP for Te Tai Tonga Tākuta Ferris lead the southern hīkoi.

=== Otago ===
On 12 November over 1000 people filled The Octagon, Dunedin's central civic plaza.

=== Canterbury ===
On 13 November, about 2000 protesters filed onto the Bridge of Remembrance. On 17 November, a convoy from Bluff and Invercargill drove up to Christchurch to meet at Tuahiwi Marae. Then the convoy departed to head to Picton then on a ferry crossing to Wellington to meet up at Waitangi Park.

=== Nelson ===
Over 2,000 people marched around Nelson on 14 November, from 1903 Square to Trafalgar St then Te Piki Mai on to the city's centre.

=== Tasman ===
Over 100 people protested in Tākaka in support of the hīkoi.

== Arrival at Parliament ==
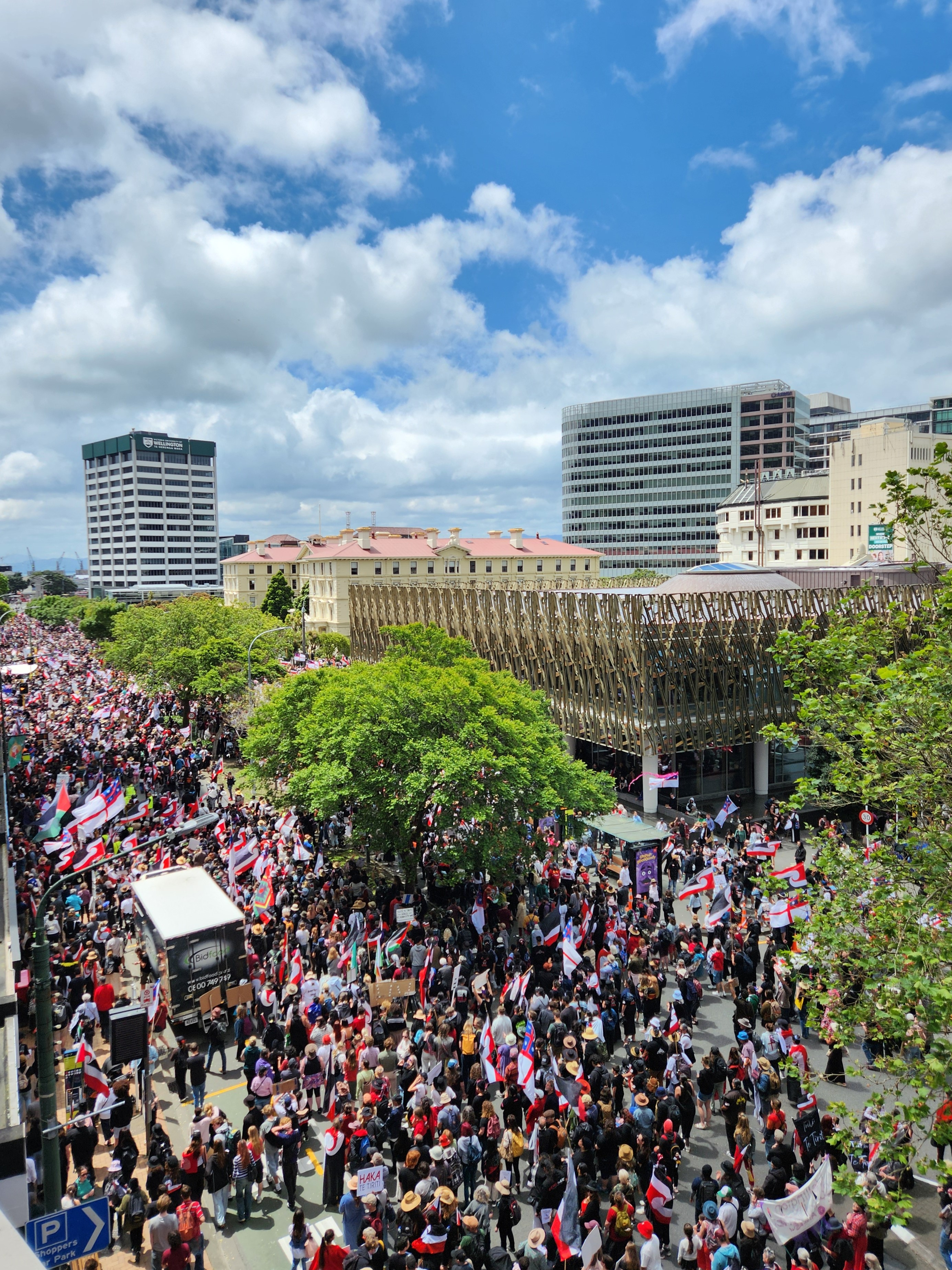
The hīkoi makes its way along Lambton Quay in Wellington

The hīkoi took nine days to reach Wellington after traversing the country, travelling a distance of around 1,060 km (660 mi).

Leading up to the march on 19 November, there were predictions it would be larger than the 2004 foreshore and seabed protests. Parliament was closed to visitors that morning. Marae in Wellington and surrounding cities hosted hundreds of visitors to the city, preparing for the hīkoi. Public transportation in the city was the busiest ever seen, according to Wellington's transport chair Thomas Nash.

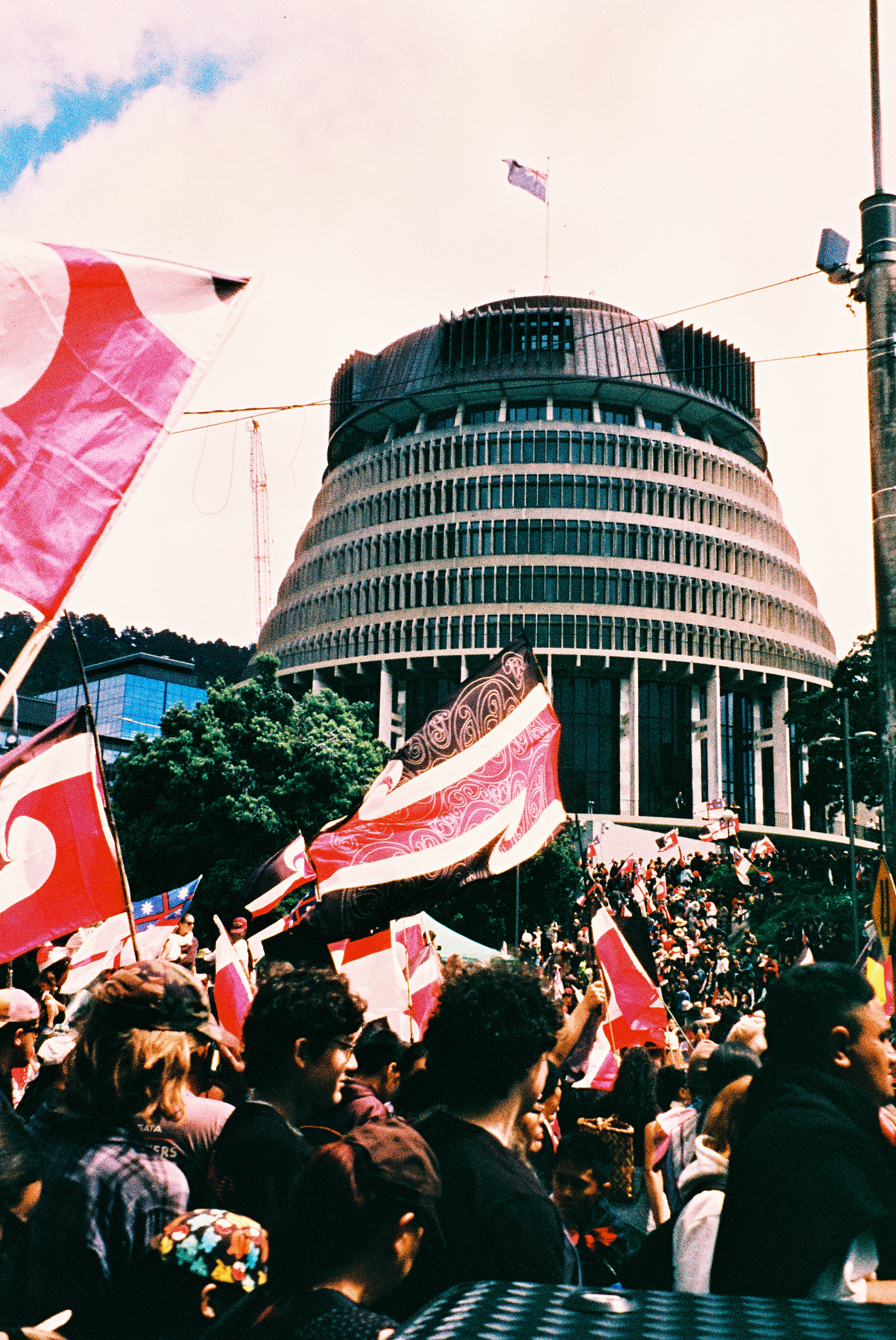
Protestors march up towards the Beehive from Lambton Quay

On 19 November, about 2000 people walked from Petone to the Wellington train station along State Highway 2. Another group departed from Porirua travelling on State Highway 59 then State Highway 1 to Waitangi Park. Police estimates say that about 42,000 people marched on Parliament in Wellington, including some on horseback. The Māori queen Nga wai hono i te po and Mayor of Wellington Tory Whanau joined the protests in Wellington. Coinciding with the march an online petition opposing the bill received over 200,000 signatures.

Stan Walker and Che Fu sang at the hīkoi and fireworks were let off several times. Attendees gave several reasons for their presence, including: supporting the Treaty as a founding document, opposing the alleged dilution of its principles, and a feeling that they were summoned to protest by their tupuna (ancestors). Outside parliament several MPs and Māori leaders (including Helmut Modik and Hana-Rawhiti Maipi-Clarke) made speeches in support of the hīkoi. Both the New Zealand National Party and New Zealand First said they would not support the bill's passage into law.

Joel MacManus of The Spinoff estimated it was the largest protest Wellington had ever seen, and possibly the largest in New Zealand's history. The BBC described it as "one of the biggest in the country's history".

Following the hīkoi a concert was held in Waitangi Park.

== International reaction ==
Around 300 people, including Indigenous Australians, protested in Sydney on 16 November, while supporters gathered with tino rangatiratanga flags in Honolulu, ending at ʻIolani Palace. In London hundreds of people gathered in protest before the New Zealand High Commission in Haymarket on 19 November, and in New York City, protesters against the bill gathered in Times Square.

Hawaiian-born Hollywood actor Jason Momoa asked his Instagram followers to support the marchers, stating that "they are fighting for their rights, their culture, and their coming generations".

== Responses ==
=== Government ===
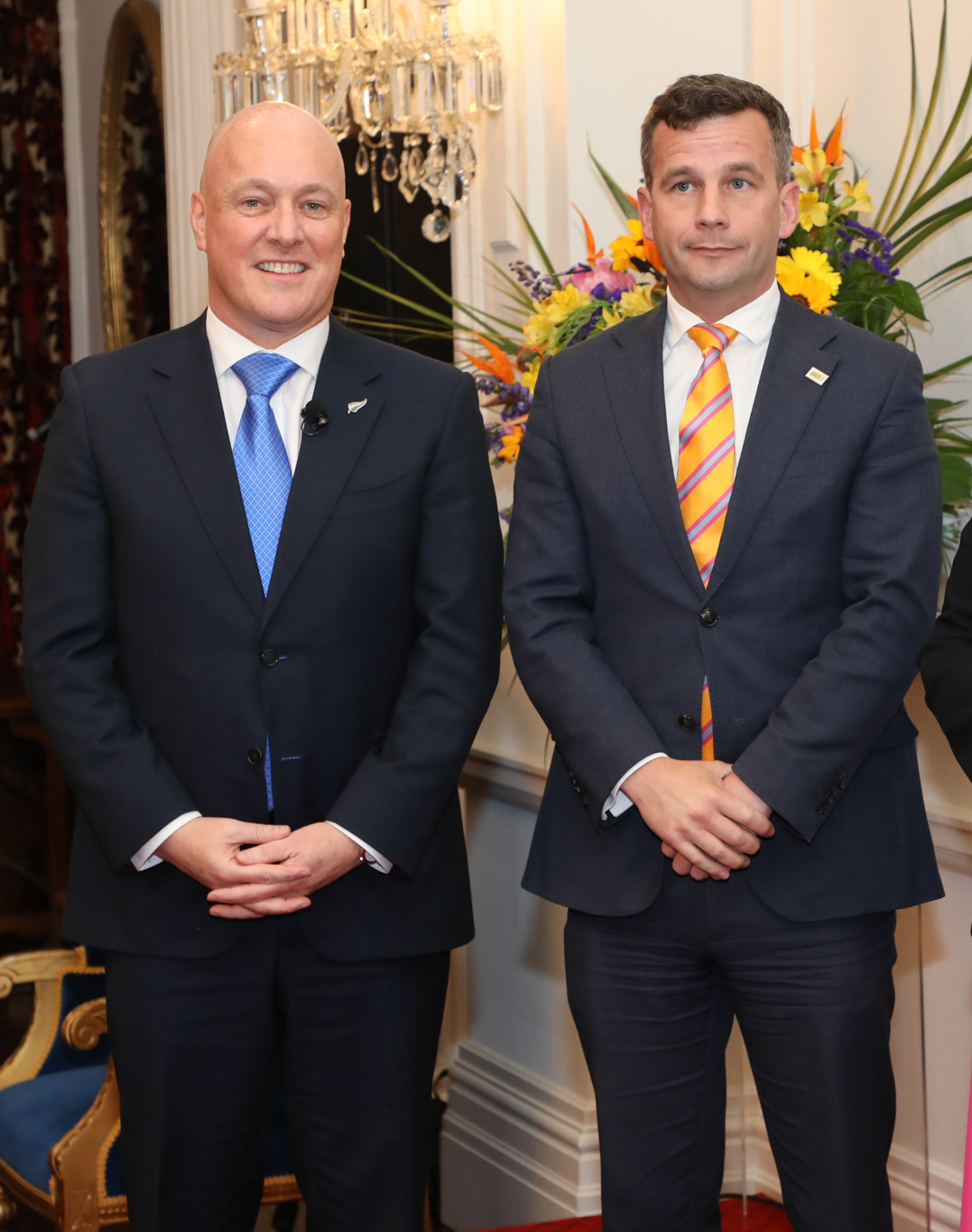
Christopher Luxon (left) and David Seymour (right)

Prime Minister Christopher Luxon described the arrival of the hīkoi at Parliament as a "significant day". While he stated he had no regrets over his support of the bill in the first reading, he also claimed that "We don't support the bill and it won't be becoming law". He said he was previously open to meeting with organisers, although later dismissed them as being "Te Pāti Māori affiliated."

Deputy Prime Minister, Winston Peters, argued that the hīkoi was pointless as, regardless of its impact, the bill was always going to be "dead on arrival", calling the hīkoi a "Maori Party astroturf". His view is that there is no Principles of the Treaty of Waitangi, and in 2004, his bill removing treaty principles was voted down. Peters also believes Māori are not indigenous to New Zealand.

David Seymour said that he was not causing division but "revealing division that was built up over several decades." He insisted a debate on the Treaty and the constitution was needed within New Zealand. Seymour also contested claims that the opposition was trying to rewrite or abolish the Treaty of Waitangi. Seymour and other ACT MPs appeared on the forecourt of Parliament and received a negative reaction from the gathered crowd in the form of chants of "kill the bill" and booing. Seymour stated that the marchers deserved to be heard by parliamentarians, in which capacity he attended, but also argued the hīkoi was not a representation of New Zealand, as only 0.2% of the country's Māori had attended. He appeared outside parliament for approximately five minutes. Seymour has suggested that National and NZ First may support the bill following the select committee process.

On 10 December, Gerry Brownlee referred Labour MP Peeni Henare, Te Pāti Māori MPs Hana-Rawhiti Maipi-Clarke, Rawiri Waititi and Debbie Ngarewa-Packer to the Privileges Committee for leading a haka (ka mate) that interrupted the vote during the first reading of the Treaty Principles Bill.

=== Civil society ===
Hobson's Pledge, a conservative group that opposes Māori affirmative action, has started a pro-Treaty Principles Bill campaign aimed at the Prime Minister, referring to him as a "scaredy cat" for not supporting the bill further.

Destiny Church leader Brian Tamaki led a "Make New Zealand Great Again" motor rally in Auckland on 16 November in opposition to the hīkoi. The rally was led by about 100 people on motorbikes. The group carried New Zealand flags, which they said was in opposition to the "divisive" Māori sovereignty flags of the hīkoi to Parliament. The Make NZ Great Again rally caused traffic disruption on State Highway 1 after several participants exited their vehicles and marched on the motorway.

=== Law enforcement ===
Minister of Police Mark Mitchell said it is "critically important" for police to be politically neutral after reports of police officers helping paint signs for the hīkoi and that he had spoken Police Commissioner regarding the matter. Wellington police reported no issues from the protestors.

== See also ==
- Māori protest movement
- 2022 Wellington protest
