= Minister for Regulation =

New Zealand political office

- Coat of arms of New Zealand

- Flag of New Zealand

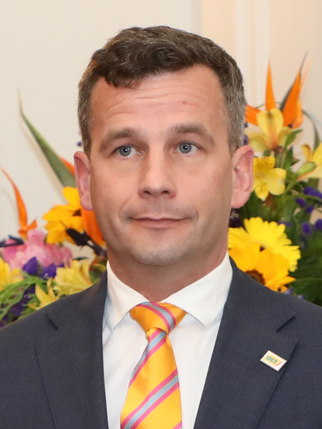
- Incumbent; David Seymour since 27 November 2023
- Ministry for Regulation
- Style: The Honourable
- Member of: Cabinet of New Zealand; Executive Council
- Reports to: Prime Minister of New Zealand
- Appointer: Governor-General of New Zealand
- Term length: At His Majesty's pleasure
- Formation: 27 November 2023
- First holder: David Seymour

The Minister for Regulation is a minister in the New Zealand Government heading the Ministry for Regulation and responsible for regulation within New Zealand.

The current minister is David Seymour, the leader of the ACT Party.

== History ==
In June 2023, Seymour proposed a Ministry for Regulation if elected as part of a National-led Government in the 2023 election. He called it the "red tape and regulation police". It is funded by the disestablishment of the New Zealand Productivity Commission, which occurred on the 29 February 2024.

== List of ministers for regulation ==
The following ministers have held the office of Minister for Regulation.

Key

ACT National

No.	Name	Portrait	Term of office		Prime Minister
1	David Seymour		27 November 2023	Incumbent	Luxon
