= Ministry for Regulation =

Government ministry of New Zealand

- Māori: Te Manatū Waeture

Agency overview
- Formed: 1 March 2024
- Jurisdiction: New Zealand
- Employees: 70
- Annual budget: $NZ16 million
- Minister responsible: David Seymour Minister for Regulation
- Agency executive: Gráinne Moss, Secretary for Regulation and Chief Executive
- Website: regulation.govt.nz

The Ministry for Regulation is a New Zealand public service department that advises the New Zealand Government on policies and issues regarding regulation. The Ministry identifies rules and regulations that are superfluous, not working or could be improved, and prepares implementable policies to reform them. It is also responsible for the quality of policy analysis relative to new initiatives across government. It was established on 1 March 2024. The minister responsible is David Seymour.

== Organisation and structure ==
The Ministry for Regulation is the fourth central agency within the New Zealand Government alongside the Department of the Prime Minister and Cabinet, Public Service Commission, and the New Zealand Treasury. The Ministry falls under the portfolio of Minister for Regulation David Seymour and is headed by chief executive Gráinne Moss.

As of April 2025, the Ministry employed 70 permanent and 17 fixed-term staff, with an average salary of NZ$150,320. The figures, released through written parliamentary questions, attracted political attention due to the salaries being significantly higher than the wider public-sector average. Minister for Regulation David Seymour said the staffing profile reflected the specialised nature of the agency’s work and expected average salaries to decrease as the ministry became more fully established.

== History ==
The Ministry for Regulation was created through funding redirected from the former New Zealand Productivity Commission, which was disestablished by the National-led coalition government in late January 2024. The establishment of the ministry had been secured by the ACT Party as part of the 2023 coalition negotiations. The Minister for Regulation David Seymour stated that the new ministry would be tasked with assessing the quality of existing and new regulation.

The Ministry for Regulation was established on 1 March 2024. On 7 March, Gráinne Moss, who had previously been the inaugural chief executive at Oranga Tamariki, was appointed as the first Secretary for Regulation and chief executive of the new Ministry.

=== Regulatory reviews ===
On 5 June 2024, the Ministry started its first sector review in early childhood education. The report, released in December, found New Zealand's early childhood education sector had exposed children to an "unacceptable risk of harm" due to excessive, confusing regulations and unclear oversight responsibilities divided between the Education Ministry and the Education Review Office. The report highlighted rules like specific door handle heights and water temperature controls as poor rule-making. It proposes simplifying around 74% of the 98 licensing criteria, including more flexible teacher qualifications to combat shortages caused by low pay and burnout. Recommendations include unannounced visits for at-risk providers and new compliance mechanisms. Minister David Seymour accepted all 15 suggestions.

On 1 August 2024, the Ministry started a review into agricultural and horticultural products. It will focus on the approvals needed for any products used to manage plants and animals. The review was completed in December 2024 and in February 2025 the Government accepted all 16 recommendations from the Review.

On 12 December 2024, the Ministry started a review into the hairdressing and barbering industry. The Hairdressing and Barbering Industry Regulatory Review assessed New Zealand’s current regulations for the sector, highlighting that the Health (Hairdressers) Regulations 1980 are outdated and ineffective. The review identified risks such as hygiene concerns, chemical exposure, and workplace hazards, exacerbated by market failures like information asymmetry and external costs. It recommended revoking these regulations, providing updated health and hygiene guidance, and monitoring industry practices for two years to determine if risk-based regulations are needed. Emphasis was placed on aligning the regulatory approach with the relatively low risks of the industry compared to other appearance services like tattooing. The review also noted significant industry trends, including a shift to home-based businesses and a rise in barbering.

In October 2025, the Ministry investigated the cost of compulsory financial audits for schools after a complaint was lodged through its “red tape tip line.” Regulations Minister David Seymour asked the Ministry of Education to explain rising audit fees, but a briefing to Education Minister Erica Stanford found the increases were driven not by outdated regulation but by changes to auditing standards, a national shortage of auditors, and historic limits on audit fees. The report noted that while a small number of schools were spending more than 10 percent of their operations grants on audits, most spent less than one percent, and overall audit costs represented about one percent of total school funding — comparable to other government agencies. The Ministry of Education had already begun a project to simplify financial reporting requirements and reduce audit burdens for schools.
