= Treaty Principles Bill =

Failed New Zealand legislation proposal

Principles of the Treaty of Waitangi Bill

New Zealand Parliament
- Territorial extent: New Zealand

Legislative history
- Bill citation: Principles of the Treaty of Waitangi Bill 2024 (94-1).
- Introduced by: David Seymour
- Committee responsible: Justice Committee
- First reading: 14 November 2024
- Voting summary: 68 voted for; 54 voted against; 1 (Note: Absence was due to the suspension of one Te Pāti Māori member from the service of the House of Representatives for 24 hours. This is as suspended members may not vote.) absent
- Second reading: 10 April 2025
- Voting summary: 11 voted for; 112 voted against; None absent
- Status: Not passed

The Principles of the Treaty of Waitangi Bill, commonly known as the Treaty Principles Bill, was a government Bill that aimed to define the principles of the Treaty of Waitangi and put them to a nationwide referendum for confirmation. The ACT New Zealand Party, who introduced this Bill, campaigned against the co-governance policies of the Sixth Labour Government and advocated a binding referendum on co-governance, claiming that the current principles distorted the original intent of the Treaty of Waitangi and created an inequality in peoples' rights. National-led coalition government partners National and New Zealand First did not support the bill past its first reading and referral to a select committee, and some legal critics argued the bill sought to undermine Māori rights and disrupt established interpretations of the Treaty. On its second reading, which occurred on 10 April 2025, the bill was voted down.

== Treaty of Waitangi ==
The Treaty of Waitangi, including a Preamble and Three Articles in English and Māori, was signed in 1840 by Māori chiefs and representatives of the British Crown. Notably, 39 chiefs signed the English version of the Treaty, while over 500 signed the Māori version, which is referred to as Te Tiriti o Waitangi. Some words in the English treaty did not translate directly into the written Māori language of the time, and thus, the Māori text is not an exact translation of the English text.

The most significant differences in the two versions of the Treaty particularly concern sovereignty, government, and governance in Articles 1 and 2. "Sovereignty" was translated as "kāwanatanga" which means 'governance' or 'government,' and many chiefs believed they were ceding the government of the country but maintaining the rights to manage their affairs. "Undisturbed possession of properties" was translated as "tino rangatiratanga" of "taonga katoa", This means 'chieftainship/full authority' over 'all treasured things'.

Aotearoa New Zealand is a signatory to the United Nations Declaration on the Rights of Indigenous Peoples (UNDRIP), which emphasises the importance of using treaties and agreements in Indigenous languages. Despite not being incorporated into law, UNDRIP has begun to influence policy and judicial decisions in New Zealand. For example, the Declaration has been referenced in several decisions of the Supreme Court of New Zealand and extensively in findings by the Waitangi Tribunal. However, in November 2023, the National-led coalition government agreed not to recognise the Declaration as having any binding legal effect on New Zealand as part of a coalition agreement. This coalition government also agreed to stop all work on He Puapua, which is a government commissioned report on implementing the goals of UNDRIP in New Zealand.

=== Principles ===
In 1975, the New Zealand Parliament passed the Treaty of Waitangi Act 1975, which established the Waitangi Tribunal and introduced the phrase "the principles of the Treaty of Waitangi." The principles were not defined, as the tribunal was intended to interpret them and apply them based on the intentions of the treaty, though they have also been interpreted by the Courts and the Crown.

== Background ==
In March 2022, leader of the libertarian ACT Party David Seymour announced a policy of redefining the principles of the Treaty of Waitangi in law during the next parliamentary term. The law would only come into effect following confirmation by a referendum on Māori co-governance that would be held at the 2026 general election. He said that agreeing to hold the referendum would be a condition for forming a government with the centre-right National Party. Seymour argued that the treaty was not a partnership between the New Zealand Crown and Māori, and therefore co-governance arrangements were not a "necessary extension" of it. He also claimed that co-governance created resentment. ACT's proposed law would affect co-governance arrangements at several Crown Research Institutes, state-owned enterprises and healthcare providers such as Te Aka Whai Ora (the Māori Health Authority). However, Seymour indicated that it would preserve existing co-governance arrangements with the Waikato, Ngāi Tahu, Tūhoe and Whanganui iwi.

Māori Party co-leader Debbie Ngarewa-Packer said ACT's proposals emboldened racism. Professor Linda Tuhiwai Smith said they reflected a "Pākehā" unwillingness to share power. Waikato leader Rahui Papa claimed that they clashed with the second and third articles of the treaty, which (he argued) guaranteed Māori participation in the social sector. In response, Prime Minister Jacinda Ardern reiterated the Labour Government's commitment to co-governance arrangements. National Party leader Christopher Luxon refused to commit to a referendum on co-governance, but acknowledged that further clarity on co-governance was needed.

In October 2022, ACT released a discussion document entitled "Democracy or co-government?", which proposed a Treaty Principles Bill that would end the focus on partnership between Māori and the Crown and interpret "Tino Rangatiratanga" solely as property rights, while accepted meanings range from "absolute soveriengty" to "self-government". The proposed Treaty Principles Bill did not mention Māori, the Crown, iwi, and hapū (subgroups), but referred only to "New Zealanders". Seymour refused to identify whom his party had consulted when developing its co-governance and Treaty of Waitangi policies, particularly its redefinition of "Tino Rangatiratanga" as property rights. As part of ACT's "colour-blind" policies, its social-development spokesperson Karen Chhour advocated the abolition of Te Aka Whai Ora.

ACT party member of parliament Rodney Hide had introduced a similar private bill in 2006, which was selected, debated, and rejected at that time.

== Coalition agreement and 2024 leak ==
Following the 2023 general election, a National-led coalition government was formed with the support of the ACT and New Zealand First parties. As part of ACT's coalition agreement with National, the parties agreed to introduce a Treaty Principles Bill based on existing ACT policy. National and New Zealand First agreed to support the bill up to the Parliamentary select committee stage. In return, ACT dropped its demand for a referendum on the Treaty of Waitangi. As of January 2025, the bill under public consultation had to be submitted to a binding public referendum.

On 19 January 2024, a Ministry of Justice memo on the proposed bill was leaked. The memo claimed that the proposed bill clashed with the text of the Treaty. The proposed bill had three principles: that the New Zealand Government has the right to govern all New Zealanders; the New Zealand Government will honour all New Zealanders in the chieftainship of their land and all their property; and that all New Zealanders are equal under the law with the same rights and duties. The Ministry's paper expressed concerns that the proposed law would conflict with the rights and interests of Māori under the Treaty of Waitangi, that the Crown was trying to define Treaty principles without consulting with Māori, that the bill breached international agreements such as the International Covenant on Economic, Social and Cultural Rights, and that it infringed on the Māori right to self-determination. Seymour claimed the memo was a "natural reaction" from a bureaucracy that had "presided over increasing division over these issues", but stated the Ministry of Justice was not biased in its advice.

The leak came on the eve of King Tūheitia's national hui on 20 January. Minister of Justice Paul Goldsmith confirmed that the Justice Ministry would investigate the leak and described the document as a draft that had not yet been considered by the Cabinet. Seymour accused the Ministry of being part of a bureaucracy that was "resistant to change." Rawiri Waititi and Debbie Ngarewa-Packer, co-leaders of Te Pāti Māori (formerly the Māori Party), used the leak to rally opposition against the proposed constitutional changes. Following the leak, staff from other government agencies who needed to look at Cabinet papers relating to the bill had to physically visit Ministry of Justice offices to look at hard copies to prevent leaks.

== Release of draft ==
Following the leak, ACT released a draft of the proposed bill in February 2024. On 7 February 2024, they embarked on a public information campaign to promote it. The campaign included the creation of a new website called "treaty.nz," which has a Questions and Answers section outlining the party's approach to the principles of the Treaty of Waitangi and a video featuring Seymour. Seymour also contested claims that the government was trying to rewrite or abolish the Treaty of Waitangi.

ACT's proposed Treaty Principles Bill consists of three articles:

Article 1

Māori: Kawanatanga katoa o o ratou whenua.

The New Zealand Government has the right to govern all New Zealanders.

Article 2

Māori: Ki nga tangata katoa o Nu Tirani te tino rangatiratanga o o ratou whenua o ratou kainga me o ratou taonga katoa.

The New Zealand Government will honour all New Zealanders in the chieftainship of their land and all their property.

Article 3

Māori: A ratou nga tikanga katoa rite tahi.

All New Zealanders are equal under the law with the same rights and duties.

The Treaty Principles Bill generated much controversy and drew criticism from Māori leaders and bodies, including the Waitangi Tribunal, the opposition parties Labour, Green, Te Pāti Māori, religious leaders and lawyers. The Waitangi Tribunal found that "the Crown had breached the Treaty principles of partnership and reciprocity, active protection, good government, equity, redress, and the article 2 guarantee of rangatiratanga."

== Legislative history ==
=== Introduction ===
On 9 September 2024, a draft outline of the Treaty Principles Bill was tabled at a Cabinet meeting, with its basic outline being signed off. Seymour confirmed that it would mention hapū (sub-group) and iwi (tribal) rights to tino rangatiratanga (self determination) and property ownership in Article 2. Cabinet agreed for the following principles to be included in the bill:

1. Civil Government: The Government of New Zealand has full power to govern, and Parliament has full power to make laws. They do so in the best interests of everyone, and in accordance with the rule of law and the maintenance of a free and democratic society.

2. Rights of Hapū and Iwi Māori: The Crown recognises the rights that hapū and iwi had when they signed the Treaty. The Crown will respect and protect those rights. Those rights differ from the rights everyone has a reasonable expectation to enjoy only when they are specified in legislation, Treaty settlements, or other agreement with the Crown.

3. Right to Equality: Everyone is equal before the law and is entitled to the equal protection and equal benefit of the law without discrimination. Everyone is entitled to the equal enjoyment of the same fundamental human rights without discrimination.

While Seymour expressed hope that the coalition parties would support the bill after its first reading, Prime Minister Christopher Luxon reiterated that the National Party would not support it beyond its first reading. New Zealand First also pledged not to support it beyond its first reading. The final version of the bill was to be considered by Cabinet again before its introduction to Parliament in November 2024. Cabinet also agreed that the bill would undergo a six-month-long select committee process, concluding in May 2025. On 5 November 2024, it was announced the bill's timetable was to introduce it to Parliament on 7 November, with the first reading debate advanced to the week of 11–15 November.

=== First reading ===
Principles of the Treaty of Waitangi Bill

On 14 November, the Treaty Principles Bill passed its first reading despite opposition from the Labour, Māori and Green parties. Support from the National Party and NZ First was guaranteed under the Coalition agreement, but only up to the second reading.

During the debate, Labour MP Willie Jackson was ordered to leave by Speaker Gerry Brownlee after refusing to withdraw a comment accusing Seymour of lying about the Treaty of Waitangi. Te Pāti Māori MP Hana-Rawhiti Maipi-Clarke interrupted parliament's vote on the bill, initiating a protest haka ("Ka Mate"), while tearing her copy of the bill in two. She was joined by many Labour, Māori and Green MPs and even the public watching from the gallery. As of November 2024, the video of the haka was viewed more than 700 million times.

The haka caused a disruption that delayed parliamentary proceedings for half an hour and led to the temporary suspension of Maipi-Clarke. It also resulted in the referral to the Privileges Committee of Maipi-Clarke, her party co-leaders Debbie Ngarewa-Packer and Rawiri Waititi, and Labour MP Peeni Henare, and further suspensions of Maipi-Clarke, Ngarewa-Packer and Waititi (see also: § Privileges Committee hearings).

When the House resumed, the bill passed its first reading that same evening, 68 votes to 54.

Votes at first reading (14 November 2024)
Party	Voted for	Voted against
National	49	0
Labour	0	34
Green	0	15
ACT	11	0
NZ First	8	0
Te Pāti Māori	0	5
Totals	68	54

=== Select committee stage ===
Public submissions on the Treaty Principles Bill opened on 19 November 2024 and were expected to close on 7 January 2025. The select committee extended the deadline to 14 January 2025, to compensate for a website failure.

In mid-December 2024, several local and regional councils including Hutt City Council, Auckland Council, Dunedin City Council, Gisborne District Council, Selwyn District Council, Environment Canterbury and Stratford District Council voted to pass motions to send submissions opposing the bill. Ashburton District Council declined to make a submission, with Mayor Neil Brown citing "the likelihood of a wide range of views within the community on the bill."

Māori lawyer and educator Roimata Smail developed an online submissions template for those opposing the bill. By 9 January 2025, her webpage had reported 15,905 visits since late November 2024. A group consisting of 165 descendants of the British missionaries Henry and William Williams, who had translated the Treaty of Waitangi, collectively submitted against the bill, saying that it went against "the original intent and integrity of Te Tiriti."

Public submissions through Parliament's website were due to conclude at 11:59 pm on 7 January 2025. Hard copies could also be sent by mail or delivered to Parliament until 5pm on 8 January. The large volume of online submissions overwhelmed Parliament's website, with people who were submitting on the night of 6 January and the morning of 7 January encountering error messages or being unable to submit their documents. In response to the large volume of submissions and technical problems on the website, the justice select committee decided to reopen submissions from 1pm on 9 January and extend the dateline to 1pm on 14 January 2025. By 9 January, the committee estimated that Parliament had received 300,000 online submissions.

On 16 January 2025, the justice select committee convened to consider the bill and confirmed that hearings would commence on 27 January 2025. Without releasing the number of total submissions, the committee estimated that it would listen to 80 hours of oral submissions for a month. To cope with the large number of submissions, the justice committee was split into two sub-committees. The first consisted of Chair James Meager, Deputy Chair Tamatha Paul, Todd Stephenson, Ginny Andersen, Paulo Garcia, Tracey McLellan while the second consisted of Chair Duncan Webb, Deputy Chair Jamie Arbuckle, Tākuta Ferris, Cameron Brewer and Rima Nakhle. Duplicate submissions, those providing first names only, initials only, or pseudonyms, and those containing racist material would be excluded. The Post reported that about 70% of the available written submissions were against the bill, with about 20% in support. (Note: These statistics are likely to be revised upwards in favour of support as better information emerges.)

Any select committee is responsible for how it handles its submissions, and the Justice Committee chose to reject submissions with "swear words, racist language, [or] abusive comments towards MPs", while allowing form submissions. About 35 parliamentary officials then attempt to summarise content, record support or opposition, and classify specific themes. The 16,000 requests for oral presentations could not realistically all be serviced, so the committee allowed each political party to nominate 100 names for consideration. A further 112 oral presentations were to be selected at random. The cost of additional parliamentary staff to oversee the public consultation has been estimated at NZ$270,000. The Labour Party criticised the ACT party for not providing an MP to participate in the Justice Select Committee hearings, despite having initiated the bill.

On 29 March, Labour MP Duncan Webb criticised the proposed exclusion of thousands of submissions from the Parliamentary record. Since Parliament had received over 200,000 online and 12,000 hand-written submissions, the select committee's staff was overwhelmed by the immense workload. Webb took issue with the proposed exclusion of thousands of handwritten submissions and insisted that every New Zealander have their say on the bill. Following a last-minute motion by ACT MP Todd Stephenson, Parliament unanimously agreed that all submissions on the bill would be added to the public record. Webb welcomed the motion but criticised the Government's decision to move the release of the select committee's report a month early, which would have excluded more submissions.

==== Oral submissions ====
The first day of oral submissions was Monday 27 January 2025. Architect of the bill, David Seymour defended the legislation and asked "can anyone actually tell people why New Zealand is better off divided into tangata whenua — land people — and tangata Tiriti — treaty people — and what societies have succeeded by dividing people by race and are better off for it?" Hobson's Pledge argued that the second principle was "critically flawed", could conflict with the other two principles, and that the bill "is effectively saying New Zealand will treat people equally, but not really" and that "that is not equality". Hobson's Pledge also wants all mention of iwi and hapū removed. London-based The Guardian focused on comments by former high court judge Edward Taihakurei Durie, who helped establish the Waitangi Tribunal, that the bill would erase 50 years of work by the tribunal. Sixteen-year‑old Te Kanawa Wilson, speaking in te reo Māori, called for the bill to be scrapped: "the Treaty protected Māori rights to self-determination and to practise their culture freely". Lady Tureiti Moxon, former Treaty Negotiations Ministers Chris Finlayson and Andrew Little also opposed the bill, arguing that it undermined the Treaty of Waitangi. Curia Market Research manager David Farrar argued in favour of defining the Principles of the Treaty of Waitangi in dedicated legislation. Retired law professor Jane Kelsey said the prospect of a citizens initiated referendum (CIR) remains even if the bill itself is rejected. (Note: Real‑time transcript [27 January 2025][1:57:12] "The issues about the referendum, it was extremely concerning in the Waitangi Tribunal to hear that the officials have been asked in parallel to this process to be working on implementation of a referendum approach on this bill. Now we hear this bill is not going to proceed, but that doesn't mean a citizen initiated referendum cannot be instituted and an attempt to have that at the time of the next election. And already the cogs are moving in that direction. That is a major problem.")

The second day of oral submissions was on Thursday 30 January 2025. The select committee heard 11 submitters, with seven opposing the bill and four supporting the bill. Former Labour MP and cabinet minister Kiri Allan denounced the bill as an "abomination", arguing that it sought to erase Māori from New Zealand history, law and their lands. She also accused the Government of claiming that the Treaty granted "extra benefits" to Māori. Retired oil industry economist John Milne supported the bill, explaining that it would mitigate sovereign risk. Sam Murton and Jo Lambert of the New Zealand Council of Medical Colleges argued that legislating for equality, rather than equity, would lead to poor health outcomes. YouthLaw general manager Darryn Aitchison said that the bill would have had an adverse impact on Māori youth accessing justice while Māori Law Society co-president Tai Ahu said that the bill would increase Māori distrust in the government. Former District Court judge David Harvey argued that the bill would clarify Treaty principles to the judiciary and also advocated a referendum. Former MP and former Mayor of Thames-Coromandel Sandra Goudie submitted in favour of the bill. University of Auckland economist Ananish Chaudhuri supported the bill, arguing against separate health and educational systems on ethnic lines based on comparisons with India.

Day three of oral submissions took place on 7 February 2025 entirely online with Duncan Webb MP as chair. Joseph Xulué from the Pacific Lawyers Association vehemently opposed the bill. Riki Welsh, speaking on behalf of Pacific Youth Leadership and Transformation, feels that "Pasifika people should support Māori". Liz Davies from SociaLink, a charitable trust operating in western Bay of Plenty, said the bill threatened healthcare provision in underserved communities. Liana Poutu, a trustee of Te Kotahitanga o Te Atiawa Trust, pointed out discrepancies between the Taranaki Maunga Collective Redress Bill, which passed in parliament last week, and the Treaty Principles Bill. Kaea Tibble, age 23 of Poupatatē Marae spoke on behalf of young people and thought that proponents of the bill were gaslighting their supporters about Crown-Māori relationships. Former race relations commissioner Gregory Fortuin said the relationship between the Crown and Māori was worse than when he was in office from 2001–2002 and the bill would damage New Zealand's international standing. Tasha Hohaia echoed the theme of international relations and spoke about attending a recent UN conference on indigenous issues where New Zealand was widely seen as regressing. Merita Levave, a teacher at Newlands College, gave a presentation and when finished, her students in the background stood up, tore up pieces of paper representing the bill, and shouted "Toitu te Tiriti". Former Labour minister and Rotorua mayor Steve Chadwick was saddened but hopeful that some good would come. Sara Cole Stratton described the work of Sir James Hēnare and his vision to reclaim the mana of te Tiriti. Murray Hawkes, from the oil and gas industry, supported the bill arguing that New Zealand currently has a corrupt and unattractive regulatory environment "because of the ambiguity and the need for preference towards Māori, there are demands of race-based payments at every step". Roger Gower supported the bill and accused successive governments of pursuing "race-based policies that undermine democracy". Mokonuiarangi Kingi of Te Taumata o Ngati Whakaue Iho Ake Trust called for a major constitutional change to honour te Tiriti and the United Nations Declaration on the Rights of Indigenous Peoples and proposed new institutions.

==== Select committee report ====
On 4 April 2025, the Justice select committee released its report and recommended that the Treaty Principles Bill not proceed further due to its inconsistency with the Treaty of Waitangi, flaws in its developmental process, its promotion of formal equality over equity, its negative impact on social cohesion, Crown-Māori relations, and the environment, concerns over its legal and constitutional implications, opposition to the use of a referendum and support for a national conversation around the Treaty. According to the report, 90% of written submissions opposed the bill, while 8% supported the bill, and 2% were unstated. 85% of oral submissions opposed the bill, while 10% supported the bill, and 5% were unstated. While the select committee has finished its report, parliamentary staff would continue to vet the remaining submissions.

The select committee's reports also contained the views of the Labour, Te Pāti Māori (TPM), Greens and ACT. National and NZ First declined to submit their views on the legislation. Labour opined that the principles in the legislation did not match the principles of the Treaty and would breach comity if passed into law. Labour also rejected the notion that the Treaty gave people different rights based on their ancestry. TPM described the bill as a "distortion" of the Treaty of Waitangi that was based on a "historical falsehood" and claimed it brought Parliament into disrepute. The Greens claimed the bill misrepresented the Treaty of Waitangi, describing it as an "international embarrassment." ACT contended that the bill sought to define the principles of the Treaty into law rather than relying on government departments and court rulings. The party also claimed that the status quo gave people different rights based on their ancestry and ethnicity; thus necessitating the bill.

=== Second reading ===
On 10 April 2025, the New Zealand Parliament voted not to progress the Treaty Principles Bill by a margin of 112 to 11 votes. The ACT party was the only party to support the bill with the National, NZ First, Labour, Green and Te Pāti Māori parties opposing the bill. Labour MP Willie Jackson was ordered by Speaker of the House Gerry Brownlee to leave after call the bill's sponsor David Seymour "a liar" in his speech. Despite the defeat of the bill, Seymour said that the ACT party would never give up on fighting for equal rights and claimed that opponents lack compelling arguments against the legislation.

Labour leader Chris Hipkins described the bill as a "stain in our country" and said it was based on a "mythology of Māori special privilege." Greens co-leader Marama Davidson emphasised that 90% of submissions opposed the bill and urged ACT to "release their myth of special treatment and find their equity bone". Te Pāti Māori MP Maipi-Clarke said "this bill hasn't been stopped; this bill has been absolutely annihilated." National MP and Justice Minister Paul Goldsmith reiterated National's promise to oppose the bill at is second reading, saying that it "seeks to impose a particular interpretation of the Treaty of Waitangi by simple majority and referendum is a crude way to handle a very sensitive topic." Meanwhile, NZ First MP Casey Costello said that the bill "would have taken us back to the courts [which] is the last thing this country needs."

Votes at second reading (10 April 2025)
Party	Voted for	Voted against
National	0	49
Labour	0	34
Green	0	15
ACT	11	0
NZ First	0	8
Te Pāti Māori	0	6
Totals	11	112

== Reception ==
=== Regulatory impact statement ===
The Ministry of Justice's regulatory impact statement says the bill "does not accurately reflect Article 2, which affirms the continuing exercise of tino rangatiratanga. Restricting the rights of hapū and iwi to those specified in legislation, or agreement with the Crown, implies that tino rangatiratanga is derived from kāwanatanga. It reduces indigenous rights to a set of ordinary rights that could be exercised by any group of citizens."

=== Māori responses ===
In January 2024, the Māori King Tūheitia called for a national hui (meeting) on 20 January to unify Māori and discuss the potential impact of the Government's Treaty policies. On 15 January, Tūheitia raised the matter of the bill during a private meeting with Prime Minister Luxon and Minister for Māori Development Tama Potaka.

On 9 May 2024, Ngāpuhi kaumātua (tribal elder) Hone Sadler and several claimants filed a challenge against the Treaty Principles Bill at the Waitangi Tribunal, describing the proposed Bill's interpretation of the Treaty as "inaccurate and misleading." They also contended that Māori never ceded sovereignty to the New Zealand Crown. On 15 May, the Tribunal heard testimony from University of Auckland Māori Studies Professor Margaret Mutu, who described ACT's Co-Government Policy Paper as "nonsensical" and a misinterpretation of the Treaty. In addition, Northland iwi Ngāti Kahu submitted a letter to King Charles III, calling on him to stop what they called a "violent attack" on the Treaty.

On 16 August 2024, the Waitangi Tribunal released its interim report into the ACT party's Treaty Principles Bill and New Zealand First's proposed review of the Treaty clauses. The Tribunal recommended that the Treaty Principles Bill should be abandoned.

=== Political parties ===
In November 2024, New Zealand Prime Minister and National Party Leader Christopher Luxon said of the bill: "We don't support it because we think it is divisive, and you know, we're proud of the Treaty of Waitangi."

During King Tūheitia's 18th Koroneihana (coronation anniversary celebration) in mid-August 2024, both Prime Minister Luxon and NZ First senior minister Shane Jones reiterated that National and NZ First would not support ACT's Treaty Principles Bill beyond its first reading. In response, ACT leader David Seymour said that Luxon and Jones had "closed their minds" when the legislation had not yet finished drafting.

During the annual Ratana celebrations in late January 2025, both Luxon and NZ First leader and Deputy Prime Minister Winston Peters reiterated that their parties would vote against the bill at its second reading. Green MP Teanau Tuiono and Te Pāti Māori co-leader Debbie Ngarewa-Packer called on the coalition government to scrap the bill.

==== NZ First ====
On 23 August, NZ First leader Winston Peters said during Question Time in Parliament that he was willing to change his mind on the Treaty Principles Bill "if there was prevailing compelling evidence to change one's mind." When Labour leader Chris Hipkins pressed Peters further on the matter, Peters said that Māori leaders Peter Buck, Maui Pomare and James Carroll had concluded there were no principles of the Treaty of Waitangi.

==== Labour, Greens, Te Pāti Māori ====
In response to the 9 September cabinet outline of the bill, Hipkins described the Treaty Bill process as shambolic and urged Luxon to jettison the "divisive" legislation. Te Pāti Māori co-leader Debbie Ngarewa-Packer described the inclusion of iwi and hapū as insufficient. Similar criticism was voiced by Green Party MP Teanau Tuiono, and Labour MPs Willie Jackson and Cushla Tangaere-Manuel.

On 7 November, the three opposition parties Labour, Greens and Te Pāti Māori issued a joint statement opposing the introduction of the Treaty Principles Bill claiming that it disregarded the Treaty of Waitangi and ignored Māori voices.

=== Civil society ===
On 9 September 2024, 400 Christian leaders including three Anglican archbishops, the Catholic Archbishop, a Catholic Cardinal, the Methodist Church president and the Salvation Army commissioner signed an open letter calling on MPs to vote against the Treaty Principles Bill and affirming their commitment to honouring the Treaty of Waitangi. In response, Seymour accused church leaders of interfering in democracy a second time, with the first time being the End of Life Choice Act 2019.

On 13 November 2024, 40 out of around 250 King's Counsel lawyers wrote a letter to Prime Minister Luxon and Attorney-General Judith Collins urging the National-led coalition to withdraw the bill on the grounds that it "seeks to rewrite" the Treaty of Waitangi. In response, Seymour defended the bill and argued that it would give everyone a voice in the Treaty debate.

Hobson's Pledge, a conservative lobby group opposing affirmative action for Māori, has started a pro-Treaty Principles Bill campaign aimed at Prime Minister Luxon, referring to him as a "scaredy cat" for not supporting the bill further.

The NZ Council for Civil Liberties (NZCCL) argues that Te Tiriti cannot "be changed by just one of the signatories". That the mandatory referendum "is an inappropriate way to address the rights of any minority and this is especially so in the case of colonisation". That the bill fails to build on previous progress on constitutional reform. And that the bill "seeks to use domestic law to constrain interpretation of an international treaty" and "will lead to expensive and uncertain litigation".

Former Race Relations Commissioner Joris de Bres labeled the bill as "the most divisive piece of legislation to be put before Parliament," expressing concerns over its potential to damage race relations in New Zealand.

ActionStation, a community campaigning organisation, created the Together for Te Tiriti campaign for people to display a graphic design that says Together for Te Tiriti. Kassie Hartendorp director of ActionStation said the campaign was for people of all backgrounds to show support for Te Tiriti o Waitangi.

=== Professional bodies ===
The New Zealand Law Society (NZLS) argued in its public submission that the bill is "fundamentally inconsistent" with Treaty principles, that Bill "diminishes Māori rights", and that there are "strong constitutional, public law, natural justice and process reasons" to halt the legislation.

The New Zealand Council for Educational Research (NZCER) argues, from an education sector perspective, that the bill "threatens progress made in revitalising te reo Māori and promoting Māori culture in schools", "risks misrepresenting the original Tiriti and white-washing our histories", and will "deeply affect the ability" of the public and professionals to "interpret Te Tiriti" going forward. NZCER recommends that the bill be scrapped.

The Royal Australasian College of Physicians (RACP) has called on the government to abandon the legislation, saying it will have "a negative impact on health outcomes for Māori". RACP Māori health committee chair Dr Matt Wheeler said "This bill undermines the state's responsibility to collaborate with Māori, rendering te Tiriti and its obligations meaningless. Consequently, equitable healthcare, a fundamental right for Māori, will continue to suffer".

=== Polling ===
A Research New Zealand poll conducted in February 2024 showed 36% in support of a referendum, with 35% opposed, the rest undecided.

An October 2024 poll by Curia and commissioned by the New Zealand Taxpayers' Union showed 46% supported the Treaty Principles Bill, 25% opposed it, and 29% were unsure. The poll also found that New Zealand First voters were most supportive and Te Pāti Māori voters were the least supportive of the bill.

A 1News-Verian poll conducted between 30 November and 4 December 2024 showed 23% of participants supported the bill, while 36% opposed it, and 39% said they did not know enough about it.

A second public opinion poll by Curia and commissioned by the ACT party between 1 December and 3 December 2024 showed 39% supporting the bill, while 36% opposed it, and 25% were unsure.

=== Protests ===
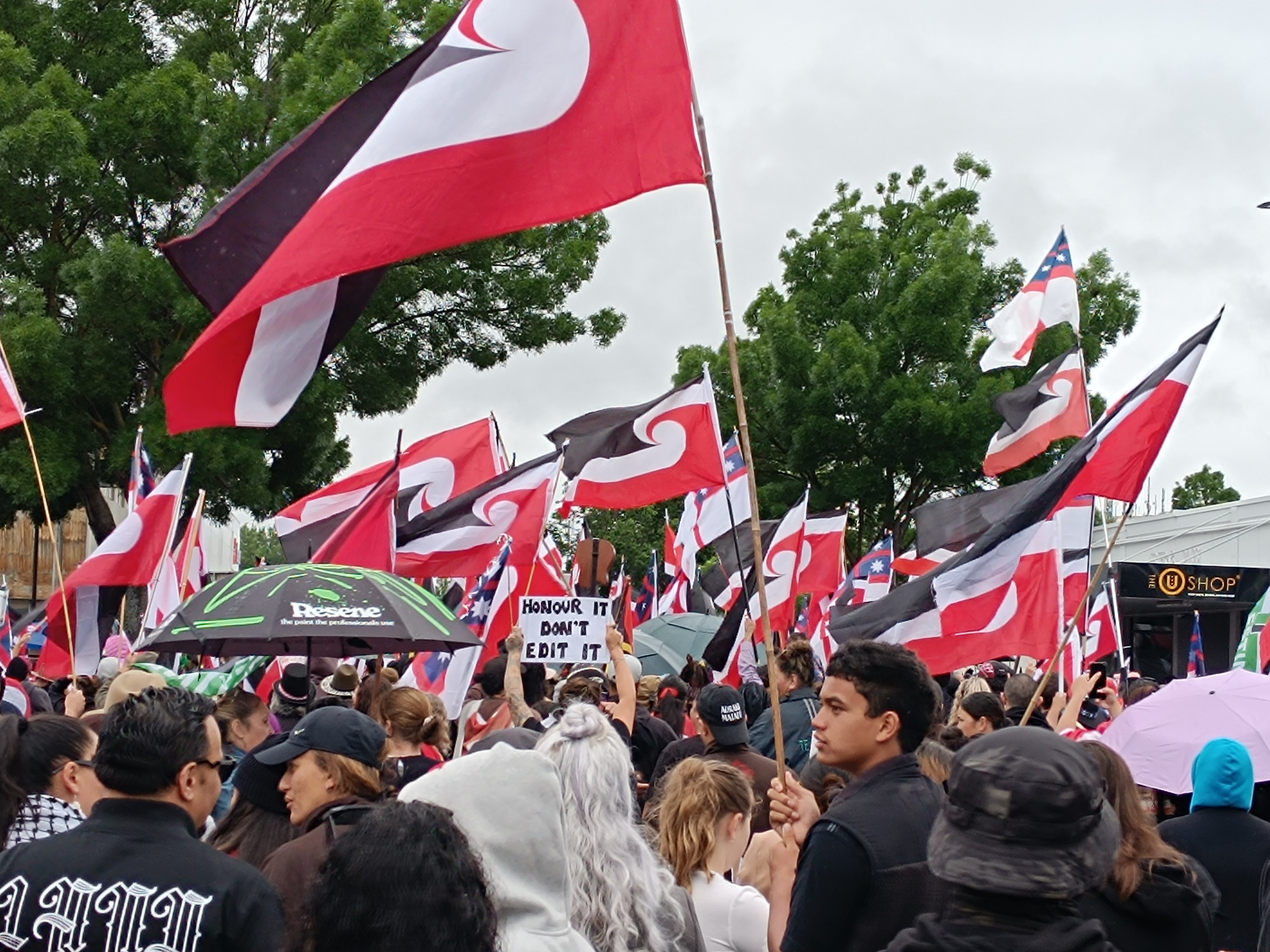
Hīkoi protest in Hastings, November 2024

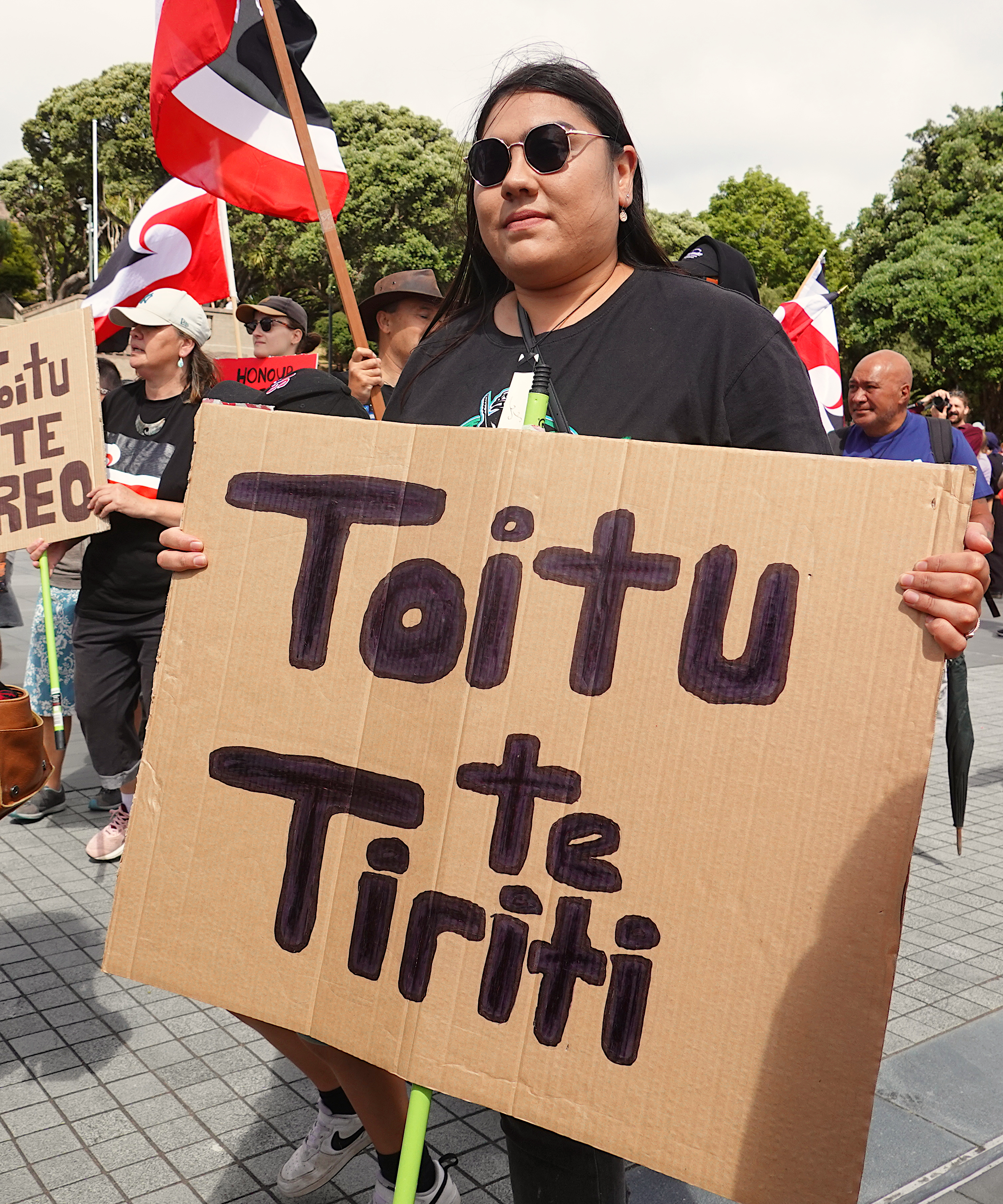
A Māori woman holds a placard reading "Toitu te Tiriti" ("Honour the Treaty") in Wellington on 6 February 2024

On 7 November, protesters gathered outside the New Zealand Parliament and Seymour's electorate office in Epsom to protest against its introduction.

From 11 November, a hīkoi (march) opposing the legislation called Hīkoi mō te Tiriti (March for the Treaty) began marching to Parliament in Wellington in two convoys beginning at Cape Reinga in Northland and Bluff in Southland. North Island Hīkoi supporters reached Whangārei on 11 November before travelling to Dargaville and Auckland's North Shore on 12 November. Organisers also worked with Police to minimise traffic disruption. By 13 November, the North Island convoy had crossed the Auckland Harbour Bridge and reached Ihumātao and Bastion Point.

The haka and hīkoi in opposition to the bill also gained the support of singer Lorde, Chris Martin of Coldplay, and actors Jason Momoa and Octavia Spencer. All Blacks player TJ Perenara incorporated a reference to the hīkoi when he led the haka for the national rugby team. He said it was important for him to acknowledge the hīkoi and the national unity at this time. There was more non-Māori support for the hīkoi than previous protests such as the Foreshore and Seabed hīkoi of 2004.

On 16 November, Brian Tamaki led a convoy down an Auckland motorway as a counter protest to the nationwide hīkoi, supporting the Treaty Principles Bill.

On 19 November 2024, tens of thousands of New Zealanders, including the Māori queen Nga wai hono i te po, joined in nationwide protest, converging in Wellington to protest the bill, marking one of the largest demonstrations in the country's history. A international petition led by youth from the iwi Ngāti Whakaue was also presented which by 25 November 2024, had amassed 289,000 signatures. It was the second largest petition in New Zealand's history.

== Privileges Committee hearings ==
Four referrals were made by the Speaker, Gerry Brownlee, to parliament's Privileges Committee for alleged breaches of privilege and disorderly conduct made during the bill's first reading debate. The specific actions under question were the interruption of the vote by Te Pāti Māori MP Hana-Rawhiti Maipi-Clarke with the "Ka Mate" haka and the movement onto the House floor by Maipi-Clarke, Debbie Ngarewa-Packer and Rawiri Waititi, and Labour MP Peeni Henare. Te Pāti Māori MPs moved toward ACT New Zealand MPs and Ngarewa-Packer made a gesture that was later described as a "finger gun" firing.

Over a series of meetings and in two reports, the Privileges Committee chaired by Attorney-General Judith Collins recommended that Henare be required to apologise to the House for interrupting a vote, that Maipi-Clarke be suspended from the House for seven days for acting in a manner that could intimidate another member, and that Ngarewa-Packer and Waititi be suspended for 21 days for acting in a manner that could intimidate another member. Henare apologised to the committee during its deliberations and apologised to the House on 25 March 2025.

The three Te Pāti Māori MPs were invited to appear before the committee. They sought to appear together, not individually, and be represented by legal counsel and tikanga experts; all of which were denied. They later agreed to provide written evidence. The MPs' letters to the committee focused on the conflict between expressions of tikanga and the rules of the House. They refused to apologise for their actions.

Following more than three hours of debate, on two sitting days, Parliament voted along party lines on 5 June 2025 to suspend Maipi-Clarke for seven days and Ngarewa-Packer and Waititi for 21 days.
