= Jane Kelsey =

New Zealand professor of law

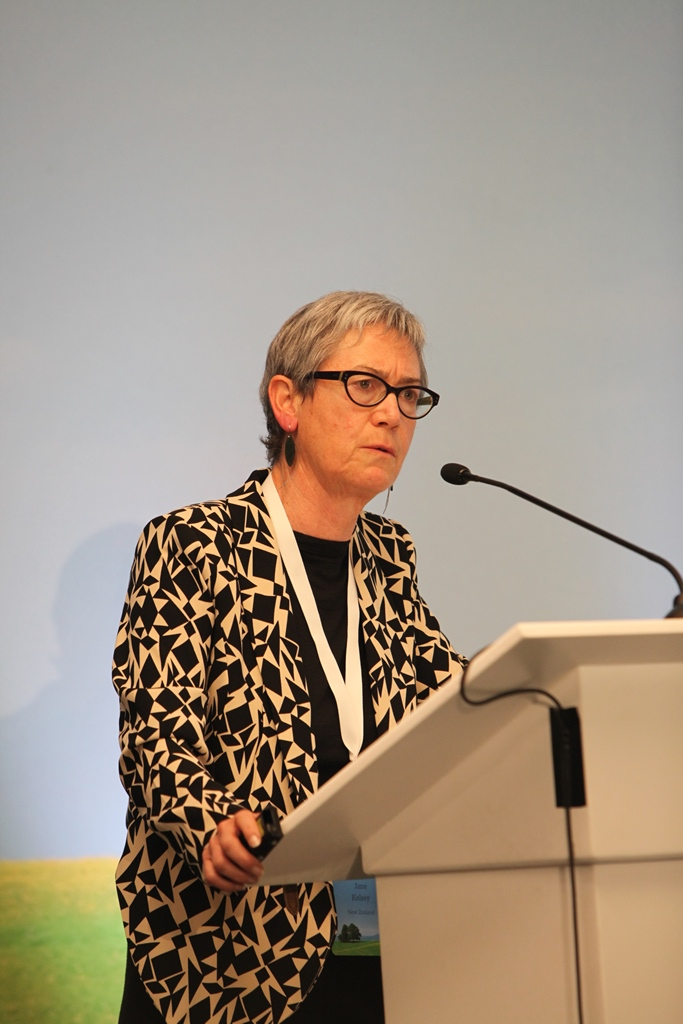

Academic background
- Education: Victoria University of Wellington; Oxford University; University of Cambridge; University of Auckland
- Thesis: Rogernomics and the Treaty of Waitangi: the contradiction between the economic and Treaty policies of the fourth Labour government, 1984-1990, and the role of law in mediating that contradiction in the interests of the colonial capitalist state

Academic work
- Discipline: law
- Institutions: University of Auckland
- Main interests: public policy

Elizabeth Jane Kelsey is a New Zealand academic and activist who has promoted critical examination of the relationship between social, political and economic issues and how these can impact on human rights and justice. Specifically, within the New Zealand context, she has advocated public policy positions on colonialism and te Tiriti Waitangi, globalisation and neoliberalism, and the role of universities as public institutions. She has published widely on these and other issues, and in 2020 won the Global category of the New Zealand Women of Influence Award. Kelsey was professor of law at the University of Auckland until her retirement in 2022.

== Education ==
Jane Kelsey has an LL.B. (Hons) from Victoria University of Wellington, BCL from Oxford University, MPhil from the University of Cambridge. In 1991 she completed a PhD from the University of Auckland, titled Rogernomics and the Treaty of Waitangi: the contradiction between the economic and Treaty policies of the fourth Labour government, 1984-1990, and the role of law in mediating that contradiction in the interests of the colonial capitalist state. She has worked at the University of Auckland since 1979 and was appointed to a personal Chair in Law in 1997.

== Associations ==
She is a key member of the Action Resource Education Network of Aotearoa (Arena), and is actively involved in researching and speaking out against the World Trade Organization, the International Monetary Fund, free trade and corporate-led globalisation. She is also actively involved in campaigning for the New Zealand Government's full recognition of the Treaty of Waitangi and opposed the controversial seabed and foreshore legislation.

Kelsey is an outspoken critic of the Trans-Pacific Partnership free trade talks, of which New Zealand is a part.

Kelsey took part in demonstrations over the 1981 Springbok tour.

In 2020, Kelsey won the Global category of the New Zealand Women of Influence Awards.

== See also ==
- Alter-globalization
- Anti-globalization movement

== Publications ==
- Economic Fundamentalism - The New Zealand Experiment: A world model for structural adjustment?. London and East Haven: Pluto Press, 1995
- Reclaiming the Future: New Zealand and the Global Economy. Bridget Williams Books Ltd. 1999
- No Ordinary Deal: Unmasking the Trans-Pacific Partnership Free Trade Agreement. ed.. Bridget Williams Books Ltd. 2010
- The Fire Economy: New Zealand's Reckoning. Bridget Williams Books Ltd, 2015
