= Garry Mallett =

New Zealand politician

4th President of ACT New Zealand
- In office 2006–2009
- Vice President: Trevor Loudon (2006–08); Michael Crozier (2008–09)
- Leader: Rodney Hide
- Preceded by: Catherine Judd
- Succeeded by: Michael Crozier

Personal details
- Born: 1960 or 1961 (age 65–66)
- Party: ACT
- Children: Four
- Occupation: Business owner-operator

Garry B. Mallett is a New Zealand politician. He was the fourth President of ACT New Zealand. As of 2010 he resides in Hamilton, New Zealand, and is a former owner-operator of a branch of Les Mills International there.

== Hamilton local politics ==
He served as a Hamilton City Councillor from 1998 to 2001 on the 'City Vision' ticket, representing the West Ward. He chaired the Economic and Audit committee. He chaired the WEL Energy Trust. At the 2002 Trust elections he led the 'Power Rebates We Won't Be Beaten On Discounts' team (PRT). In the 2008 WEL Energy Trust elections the 'Power Discounts Team' (PDT) captured a majority from Mallett's PRT.

In 2009 a complaint was filed to the Advertising Standards Authority against one of Mallett's advertisements in the Hamilton This Week campaigning against Māori electorates being established on the Auckland 'Supercity' Council, which called such reserved political positions and their promoters "racist". Mallett said that the complainant was "attempting to silence [his] opinion." The complaint was not upheld.

In the 2013 Hamilton local elections Mallett was re-elected to the Hamilton City Council for the East Ward. He stood as part of the New Council – New Direction ticket.

In August 2017, Mallett attracted a formal complaint after using the terms "fags" and "homos" during official Council meetings. The slurs were regarding the pink papers on which meeting documents were printed. When contacted by journalists, Mallet denied having a recollection, but explained that "if I did [use those terms], I'm comfortable about it." He also defended any comments as being a "light hearted jest," and claimed that these words were used frequently by the gay community.

In recent elections he won 5,876 votes in 2010 (not elected), 6,725 in 2013 and 5,274 in 2016.

== Involvement with ACT ==
Mallett joined the ACT party in 1995. In the 1996 election, he unsuccessfully contested the Hamilton West electorate. He was ranked 27 on the party list, and came sixth out of nine candidates in the electorate.

In the campaign of the 2005 election, Mallett made a vomiting gesture during a discussion about homosexuality, which drew controversy. He stood in Hamilton East, winning 1.44% of the electorate vote, and came sixth place.

In the 2008 election Mallett again stood in Hamilton East and 44th on the ACT party list. He came fifth in that electorate, with 1.27% of the vote, a loss of 0.18 percentage points from the previous election.

Mallett served as the secretary for ACT through the 2014 general election. On 29 May 2015 the Electoral Commission referred him to the police for failing to file returns for two donations by Jenny and Alan Gibbs of greater than $30,000.

=== President ===
In January 2006 the president of ACT, Catherine Isaac, announced her intention to resign from the position. In March that year the party elected Mallett to succeed her, beating farmer John Ormond. At the same time, Trevor Loudon was elected as vice-president of the party.

Party political offices
Preceded by Catherine Isaac	President of ACT New Zealand; 2006–2009	Succeeded by Michael Crozier
