= Surrogacy in Canada =

Surrogacy is legal in Canada, provided that it is an altruistic (unpaid) act. In 2004, the federal government of Canada passed the Assisted Human Reproduction Act (AHRA) ("the Act"), which criminalized commercial (paid) surrogacy. The validity of surrogacy contracts and the process for establishing the child's parentage is governed by provincial and territorial laws.

Surrogacy is increasingly becoming more common in Canada due in part to the rise of infertility issues, and international intended parents being attracted by the high-quality universal health care and relatively liberal regulations. However, Canada's surrogacy laws are still subject to criticism, and many have pushed for revision of the law since the Act was passed.

== Legal restrictions ==
Based on the 1993 report by the Royal Commission on New Reproductive Technologies, as well as input from experts and individuals directly affected by assisted human reproduction technology, the federal government of Canada passed the Assisted Human Reproduction Act in 2004. It makes it illegal to pay a surrogate, egg donor, or sperm donor in Canada. It also criminalizes commercial "intermediaries," such as surrogacy agencies, from arranging surrogacy services or matching prospective parents and surrogates. The Act establishes a minimum age of 21 for surrogates.

While monetary or other gain is illegal, the Act allows the intended parent(s) to reimburse a surrogate for out-of-pocket expenses incurred in relation to the surrogacy including maternity clothes, medications, and travel. A surrogate may be reimbursed for lost wages; however, a doctor must declare in writing that bed rest is medically necessary for this reimbursement to be legal. Receipts must generally back reimbursements and cannot result in financial gain for the surrogate.

As of 2026, there has only been one conviction under the Act: a 2014 case in which an Ontario company, Canadian Fertility Consultants ("CFC"), was fined $60,000 for purchasing eggs, paying surrogates and accepting consideration for arranging the services of a surrogate contrary to the Act.

== Provincial and territorial laws overview ==
The federal government determines and maintains surrogacy laws, while provincial and territorial governments oversee surrogacy agreements and parental rights. The intended parent(s) go through the parentage declaration process to be recognized as the child's only legal parent(s). However, this process and the requirements that must be met for the declaration to be approved vary depending on the province/territory, resulting in some cases where the intended parent(s) must adopt the child.

Surrogacy contracts and parental rights laws have been found to use heteronormative assumptive language. Some provinces have addressed this choice of language to be more inclusive. In 2016, Ontario passed the All Families Are Equal Act, which meant that parentage laws had to be reworked for families with only one or more than two intended parent(s) and include inclusive language for same-sex couples.

=== Alberta ===
In Alberta, a court order is required for parentage declaration. If there is no genetic link between the child and at least one of the intended parents, parents will have to go through the adoption process. If only one parent has a genetic link, they will appear solely on the birth certificate, and the other parent will have to adopt the child.

=== British Columbia ===
Intended parent(s) have two options for establishing parental rights: they can go through the administrative process of a statutory declaration or, if necessary, a court-ordered parentage declaration. No genetic link between the intended parent(s) and the child is required for parent(s) to appear on the birth certificate. Up to 6 parents can be listed on the birth certificate.

=== Manitoba ===
While no genetic connection is required, the surrogate's name is initially listed on the birth certificate along with the intended father (if there is one). The surrogate's name will be removed or replaced when a court-ordered declaration of parentage is approved.

=== New Brunswick ===
The surrogate's name and the intended father (if there is one) are initially listed on the birth certificate. The surrogate's name will be removed or replaced when a court-ordered declaration of parentage is approved. However, if neither intended parent has a genetic link with the child, they will have to adopt the child.

=== Newfoundland ===
Intended parents can apply for interim custody before the birth of the child; however, the surrogate's name will appear on the birth certificate initially. Intended parents will go through the parentage declaration process before appearing on the birth certificate. If there is no genetic link between the child and at least one of the intended parents, parents will have to go through the adoption process.

=== Northwest Territories ===
There are no clear laws or guidelines for intended parent(s) and surrogates. While parentage declarations are available, adoption is believed to be the preferred or more commonly used legal process for establishing parentage in the Northwest territories.

=== Nova Scotia ===
In Nova Scotia, a court-ordered declaration of parentage is required. Surrogates, alongside intended fathers (if there is one), are named on birth certificates; however, the surrogate's name will be replaced/removed once a court order is approved. If there is no genetic link between the intended parent(s) and the child, an adoption process will be required.

=== Ontario ===
Under Ontario’s Children’s Law Reform Act, up to four intended parents may become the legal parents of a child born through surrogacy without a court order. This route requires a written surrogacy agreement made before conception, independent legal advice for the surrogate and intended parents, and the surrogate’s written consent to relinquish parentage given at least seven days after the birth. The intended parents, usually with the assistance of legal counsel, can then register the birth using statutory declarations from themselves and the surrogate. A genetic connection between an intended parent and the child is not required under these rules.

A court order, known as a “declaration of parentage,” may be needed when the statutory conditions are not met, when there are more than four intended parents, or when the surrogate does not provide the required consent. Intended parents may also seek a court order where documentation is needed for recognition of parentage outside Ontario.

=== Prince Edward Island ===
As of March 2021, an administrative process rather than a court-ordered process is legal for establishing parentage. However, the surrogate's name will still initially appear on the birth certificate, and a court order is required for the name to be removed from the birth certificate.

=== Quebec ===
In Quebec, birth certificates can solely list the surrogate name or the intended father's (if there is one) name. Alternatively, they can list both the surrogate's and the intended father's (if there is one) names. The other intended parent (if there is one) must go through the adoption process to establish parentage. If neither intended parent has a genetic link with the child, parents must go through the adoption process. Until it was repealed on June 6, 2023, Article 541 of the Quebec Civil Code rendered all surrogacy contracts null. In a 2009 case, a Quebec surrogate gave up her legal claim to her baby, having made an arrangement with a couple. The intended father was recognized as a legal parent because his sperm had been used to conceive the child, but the court denied any legal rights to the intended mother, leaving the child with no legal mother. In four subsequent cases, Quebec courts have allowed intended parents to adopt a child born via surrogate.

=== Saskatchewan ===
A court-ordered parentage declaration and a pre-existing surrogacy agreement are required. Surrogates are initially listed on the birth certificate alongside the intended parent(s). However, no genetic link is required to establish parental rights in Saskatchewan.

=== Yukon and Nunavut ===
In Yukon and Nunavut, no clear information is available on guidelines or laws for how intended parents establish rights; however, parentage declarations are available.

== Increase in Canadian surrogacies ==
Surrogacy in Canada has increased in popularity over the past two decades. Between 2001 and 2012, 803 IVF-conceived births were recorded for gestational surrogates in Canada (statistics on traditional surrogacies are not available). There are many reasons a person or couple would choose to use a surrogate. Primarily, the rise of infertility (a study found that 1 in 6 Canadians can face fertility issues) and Same-sex couples choosing to have children have been linked with this rise. The increase in surrogacies is also connected to Canada becoming a popular site for international surrogacy.

== International surrogacy ==
The increased demand for surrogates and the limited number of people willing to be surrogates has led many to seek surrogacy agreements internationally. Canada is one of the few countries which allows international surrogacy and does not discriminate on the basis of marital status or sexual orientation.

=== International intended parent(s) with a Canadian surrogate overview ===
Canada has become an attractive location for foreign intended parent(s). This is in part due to its high-quality universal health care and relatively liberal regulations that may be easier to navigate than those in the intended parent(s) home country. While it is illegal under the AHRA for Canadians to pay a surrogate, Canadian surrogates may legally accept payment from the international intended parent(s), provided that the transaction occurs outside Canada.

In 2016 and 2017, 45 of 102 babies born to surrogates in British Columbia had intended parent(s) outside of Canada (nationwide statistics are not collected).

=== Canadian intended parent(s) with an international surrogate overview ===
Children born through international surrogacy with at least one intended parent being a permanent Canadian citizen are considered Canadian citizens from birth. Importantly, this parent does not have to be genetically related to the child; however, they do have to have legal documents proving parentage.

== Critiques ==
=== Criticism of federal surrogacy law ===
Canada's strict surrogacy laws were partly founded on feminist fears that commercial surrogacy in Canada could result in women being exploited. Despite this rationale, some debate the law and raise concerns that it may be causing more harm than good. While some believe the law needs to be reworked, others argue that commercial surrogacy should be legal altogether.

They argue that while it is illegal for surrogates to profit from their own bodies financially, the ambiguous language behind the law is problematic and can result in exploitation. That is, while surrogates cannot be paid, there are surrogacy agencies that can accept payments. These agencies advertise services that help surrogates and intended parent(s) navigate the complex laws surrounding surrogacy. There are no clear guidelines from the federal, provincial or territorial governments stating how these agencies can be monetarily compensated for their part in the surrogacy process. Therefore, some argue that this allows the agencies to function through the grey areas of law and profit from unpaid surrogates.

=== Criticism of international surrogacy in Canada ===
Another leading issue in the Canadian surrogacy law debate centres around international surrogacy. Many argue that babies born in Canada with international intended parents should not automatically have Canadian citizenship. This argument is hotly debated as it does not seem to be founded in genuine cases where Canadian surrogacy was chosen so that the child would have Canadian citizenship.

International surrogacy concerns expand into how it affects Canadian healthcare. While Canadian taxpayers fund Canada's healthcare system in international surrogacy cases (as it pertains to the surrogate's prenatal care), it is accessed and benefits an international audience.

Children born to foreign intended parents are not covered by Canada's health care insurance regime and therefore face significant hospital bills unless health insurance is arranged for the baby proactively.

Further critics revolve around fears for Canadian surrogates who are left with the child if internationally intended parent(s) back out of the surrogacy agreement.

Also, Canadian intended parents are experiencing issues when building their families due to increasing reports that consider Canada as a destination country for surrogacy. International intended parents seeking surrogacy in the country might create more demand on the limited number of Canadian surrogates.

==== Notable case ====
In 2011, Cathleen Hachey, a New Brunswick woman, agreed to be a surrogate for a British couple; however, three months before the due date of the twins, the intended parents split up and decided to back out of the agreement. While Hachey was legally responsible for the children as she had been the egg donor, she was able to find an adoptive family; this case increased concerns surrounding international surrogacy.

=== Criticism of lack of agency regulation ===
Surrogacy agencies operate in Canada without a surrogacy-specific licensing system or standards governing their screening, handling of client funds, or business practices. The federal Assisted Human Reproduction Act prohibits accepting payment to arrange a surrogate’s services, while agencies may charge for other services. The scope of permitted agency activity has been a source of uncertainty. Concerns have arisen from intended parents about failed matches, limited refunds and difficulty obtaining an accounting of funds held for surrogate expenses. Academic research based on interviews with intended parents has likewise raised concerns about agency practices and called for greater oversight.

== See also ==
- Fertility tourism
- Surrogacy laws by country
- Surrogacy in India
- Surrogacy in New Zealand
- Surrogacy Arrangements Act 1985
