= Zenith Applied Philosophy =

New Zealand based organisation

Zenith Applied Philosophy (ZAP) is a Christchurch, New Zealand based organisation founded by John Dalhoff (a.k.a. John Ultimate) in 1974. ZAP has a world view which is a combination of Scientology, Eastern mysticism and the ideas of the American John Birch Society. There was extensive overlap between the organisation and the Tax Reduction Integrity Movement. Members (sometimes called students) abstain from drugs and practice "mental discipline and applied philosophy".

== History ==
While studying at Massey University in the 1960s John Dalhoff became attracted to the Church of Scientology and in 1965 travelled to the United Kingdom to study at the Saint Hill Manor Scientology Centre, returning to New Zealand as a full-time Scientology worker. However, in 1972 he was expelled from the church for "failure to comply with the ethical codes of the Church of Scientology". In August 1974 he declared that he had reached "the ultimate state" and on 7 September announced publicly that he was "John Ultimate" and that his Christchurch home was the center of the universe. ZAP members phoned world leaders to inform them of Dalhoff's revelation. He and another ZAP member were later charged with obstructing a road when trying to inform a passerby. The Church of Scientology placed ZAP out of bounds to its members.

Members of ZAP would approach people on the street and customers at ZAP-run businesses asking questions such as "Are you interested in world affairs?" or "Are you worried about creeping communism?" Positive responses were followed by an invitation to buy material, most commonly publications from the John Birch Society such as None Dare Call it Conspiracy (by Gary Allen and Larry Abraham, 1972). People seen as "achievers" or "high-tone" were invited to take personality tests; they were then encouraged to take courses costing from $160 to $680 (1979).

The courses had emphasis on self-control and self-improvement; one of them had the aim of taking the student to the "ultimate state" which Dalhoff had reached. The Church of Scientology has agreed that the selling methods and purpose of the ZAP courses are similar to their own. In 1980 The Press estimated that there were between 4 and 5 thousand ZAP students, though the same newspaper said in 2008 that "At its feisty peak the sect probably had no more than a few hundred recruits" by 1990 the membership had dwindled to about 20 to 30 people. According to The Press ZAP courses were still being run in 2008 from a suite in The Heritage Hotel by John Dalhoff's wife Joy.

== Businesses ==
In the late 1970s and early 1980s ZAP members ran a number of fast food restaurants in Christchurch. In 1981 claims of $21,152 were brought against one of the most successful enterprises, Sandwich Factories, by the Canterbury Hotel, Restaurant and Related Trades Union (now part of the Service & Food Workers Union) on behalf of 6 employees. The court ruled that the company had committed 15 breaches of the award. The court commented that the owners' beliefs about "coercive unions" "were apparently part of the philosophy of an organization known as Zenith Applied Philosophy (Z.A.P) but with such metaphysical concepts we are not concerned". Around 1980 similar allegations were made against Luigi's Pizzas, The Dog House, Farmer John's Chicken House, American Burger Bar, and Roasters Restaurant. Following these disputes a number of fast food businesses ran by ZAP members were spraypainted with the words "ZAP Poison." Sociologist Paul Spoonley has noted that these disputes arose from "the ZAP belief that unionism is based on coercion and that it constitutes a basic violation of individual freedom". The group also ran the organic farm Natrodale Plus Organics. Breaches of ZAP's rules and principles would result in members working there. Today the operation is a company directed by committed ZAP member Susan Dawe.

== Politics ==
The politics of ZAP can be seen as libertarian-minarchism. ZAP courses combined material from the John Birch Society with other free enterprise materials. In addition one of the principal texts was Frédéric Bastiat's The Law which advocates restricting government to the operation of law and order in society, and that redistribution of wealth should not be contemplated. ZAP also contended that the mixed economy of New Zealand was contrary to the interests of the people. A goal of the organization was reducing the power of trade unions and supporting the right to decide conditions of work within individual enterprises. In 1980 members of ZAP circulated an anti-union petition in Christchurch. Members were also known to approach people on the street "shouting about unions, or democracy, or bang on the roofs of Lada cars berating their owners for driving a communist car."

== Notable members/students ==
- John Dalhoff a.k.a. "John Ultimate", founder of ZAP
- David Henderson, property developer and author of "Be Very Afraid".
- Trevor Loudon, former ACT Party vice president and blogger.
- The Wizard of New Zealand
