= Twelve Local Heroes =

Series of bronze busts in Christchurch, New Zealand

Coordinates: 43.53106°S 172.62872°E

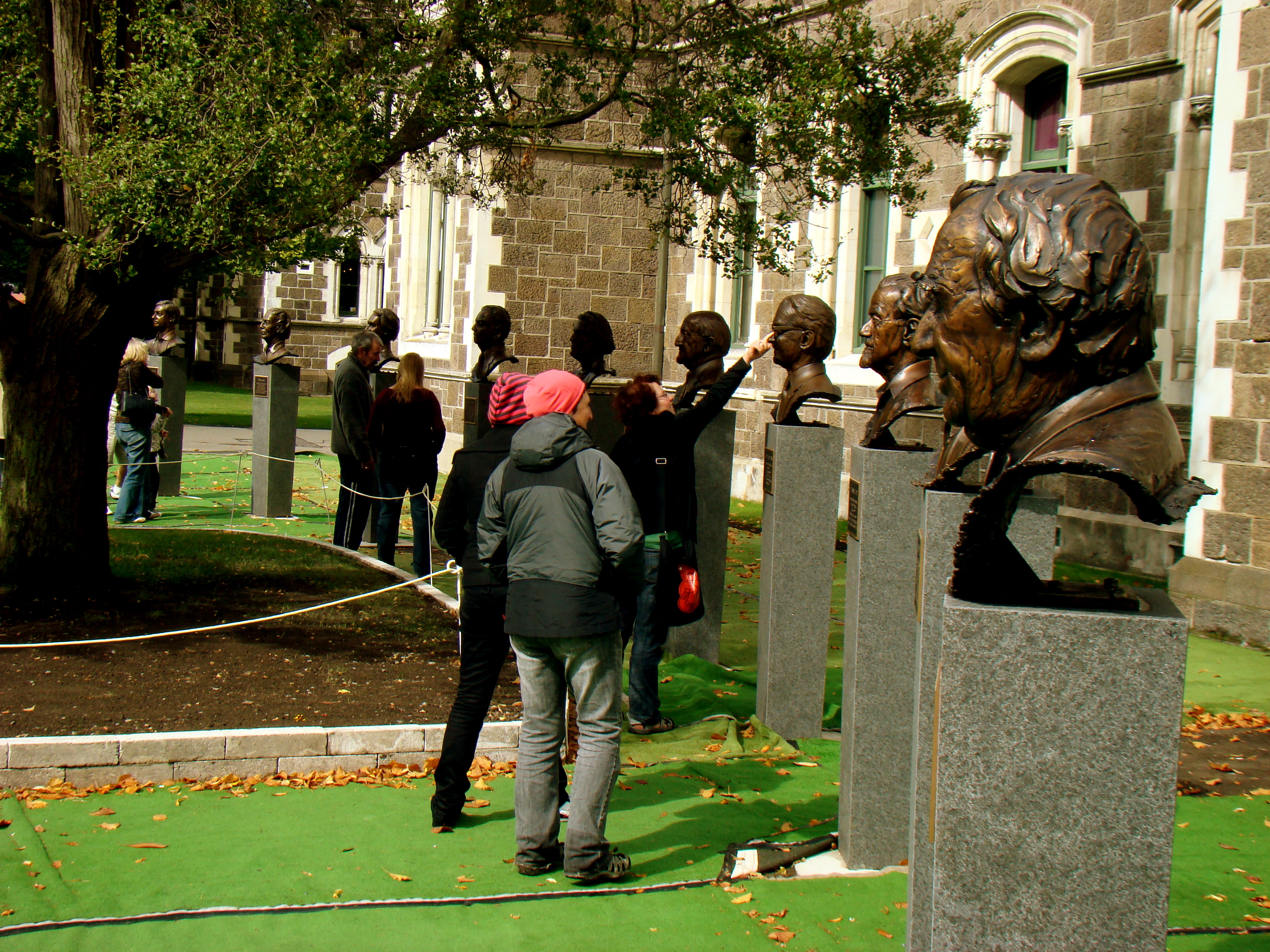
The Twelve Local Heroes sculptures

The Twelve Local Heroes is a series of bronze busts in Christchurch, New Zealand. Sculpted by Mark Whyte, the objective was to commemorate twelve local Christchurch people who were prominent in their respective fields in the latter part of the 20th century. The artwork series was initially installed in the central city on Worcester Boulevard outside the Arts Centre. Removed after the 2010/2011 Canterbury earthquake sequence, the busts were reinstated in 2023 at the University of Canterbury campus in the suburb of Ilam.

== History ==
The establishment of the commemorative sculptures was driven by the Twelve Local Heroes charitable trust. The project had been four years in the making before the bronze busts were unveiled on 18 March 2009. The artwork was produced by the sculptor Mark Whyte.

The sculptures were removed from their position on Worcester Boulevard to facilitate the post earthquake restoration of the Engineering block of the Arts Centre of Christchurch. Following the restoration, it was envisaged that they would return. Instead, the busts were installed in January 2023 at the University of Canterbury campus in the suburb of Ilam as part of the university's 150th anniversary. It is envisaged that the Twelve Local Heroes will remain at the university for two years.

== Local Heroes ==
The Twelve Local Heroes can be grouped by having died prior to the project commencing, by agreeing to be included but having since died, and by being alive.

=== Deceased prior to project start ===
Members of this group had no influence on their inclusion as one of the Twelve Local Heroes, as they had died before the decision was made to create a memorial.

Name	Life years	Description
Bill Sutton	1 March 1917 – 23 January 2000	artist
Elsie Locke	17 August 1912 – 8 April 2001	writer, feminist and social activist

=== Deceased since project start ===
Members of this group were asked and agreed to be included as one of the Twelve Local Heroes, but have since died.

Name	Life years	Description
Charles Luney	28 June 1905 – 18 November 2006	building industry leader
Sir Angus Tait	22 July 1919 – 7 August 2007	electronics pioneer and businessman
Sir Robertson Stewart	21 September 1913 – 13 August 2007	industrialist and exporter
Professor Sir Don Beaven	31 August 1924 – 4 November 2009	medical researcher in the area of diabetes treatment and prevention
Margaret Mahy	21 March 1936 – 23 July 2012	author of children's and young adult books
Diana, Lady Isaac	2 September 1921 – 23 November 2012	conservation, arts and architecture benefactor
Sir Miles Warren	10 May 1929 – 9 August 2022	architect
Frank Dickson	11 May 1931 – 2 March 2023	former Canterbury Savings Bank chief executive

=== Living ===
Members of this group were asked and agreed to be included as one of the Twelve Local Heroes, and are still alive today.

Name	Born	Description
Sir Richard Hadlee	3 July 1951	former cricketer
Sir Tipene O'Regan	1 January 1939	Māori leader
