= 1995 New Zealand Royal Visit Honours =

Awards list for New Zealand

1995 Royal Visit Honours
- Previous: 1995 Queen's Birthday Honours; Next: 1996 New Year Honours
- Type: New Zealand royal honours: Royal Victorian Order
- Date: 10 November 1995
- Country: New Zealand
- Total recipients: 10

The 1995 New Zealand Royal Visit Honours were appointments by Elizabeth II to the Royal Victorian Order, to mark her visit to New Zealand that year. They were announced via a Special Honours List on 10 November 1995.

The recipients of honours are listed here as they were styled before their new honour.

== Royal Victorian Order ==
=== Dame Grand Cross (GCVO) ===
- Her Excellency Dame Catherine Anne Tizard GCMG DBE – Governor-General of New Zealand.
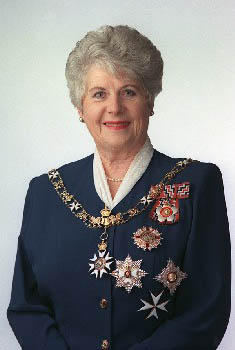
Dame Cath Tizard

=== Commander (CVO) ===
- Genevieve Margaret Jordan LVO – New Zealand secretary to The Queen.
- Neville Hugo Sale Judd – official secretary, Government House.
- Janet Marie Warren Shroff – clerk of the Executive Council, secretary of the Cabinet and acting clerk of the Privy Council.
- Colonel Joseph James Walker OBE – comptroller, Government House.
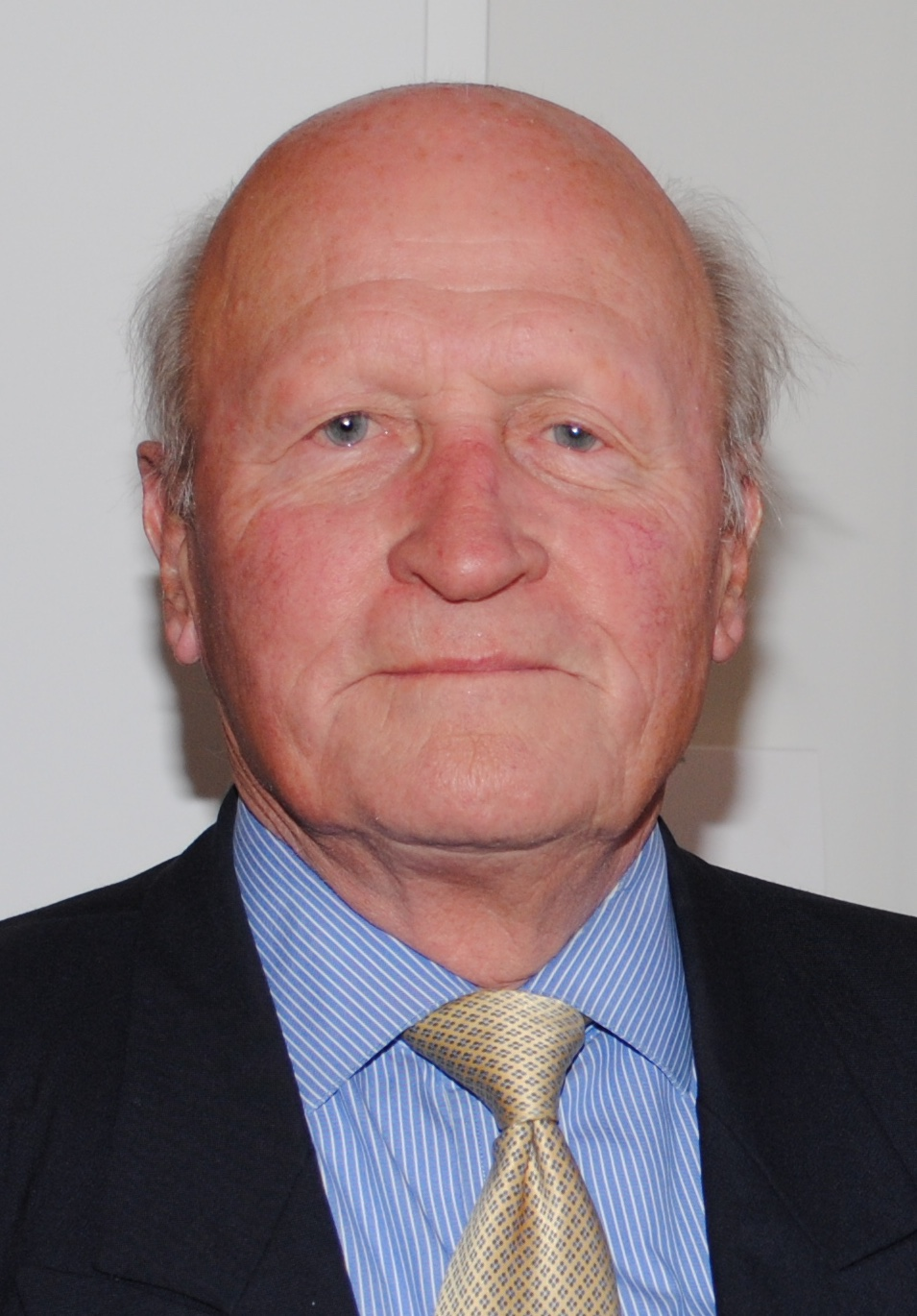
Hugo Judd

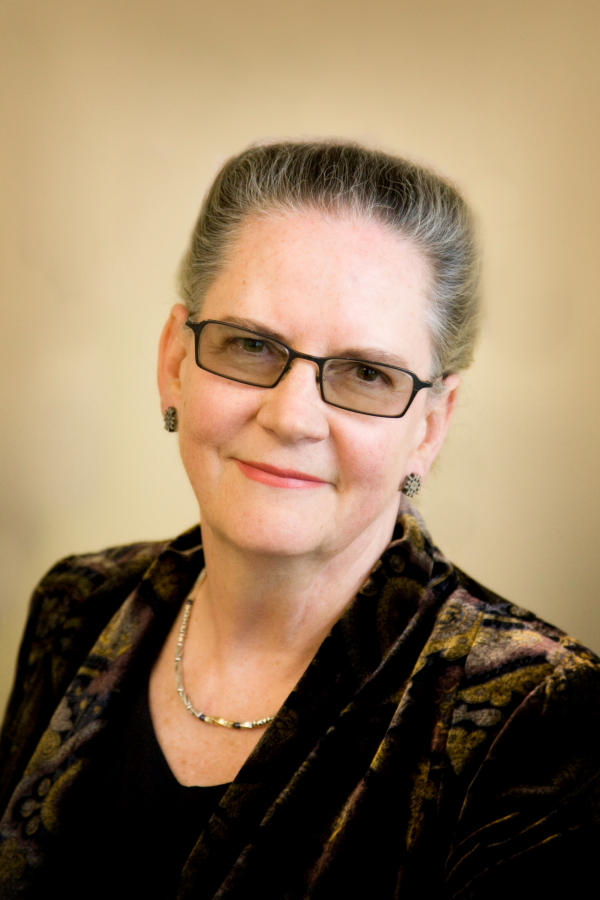
Marie Shroff

=== Lieutenant (LVO) ===
- Paul Newton Brewer – deputy director, Royal Visit.
- Phillippe Patrick O'Shea – New Zealand Herald of Arms Extraordinary to The Queen.
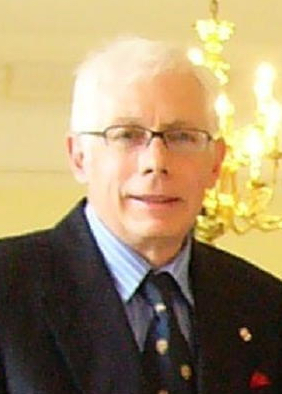
Phillip O'Shea

=== Member (MVO) ===
- Michael John Dinnan – motor transport officer, Royal Visit.
- Squadron Leader Russell Graeme Pirihi – Royal New Zealand Air Force; New Zealand equerry to The Queen.

== Royal Victorian Medal ==
=== Gold (RVM) ===
- Robert Hotson Francis Sisson-Stretch RVM – butler, Government House.
