= David Henderson (property developer) =

South Island-based New Zealand property developer

David Ian Henderson
- Occupation: Property developer
- Known for: Battling with the IRD

David Henderson is a New Zealand property developer based in Christchurch. (Note: Note that there is an Auckland-based property developer of the same name)

In 1994 he founded the libertarian magazine the Free Radical. He was also a student of Zenith Applied Philosophy, "It really sparked my interest. I found it greatly stimulating and inspiring, immensely so. They got a terribly bad name, a bad rap."

From 1992 to 1995 he was audited 27 times after claiming a GST refund and the Inland Revenue Department demanded he pay NZ$924,341 in taxes and penalties. He was charged with fraud, his business failed and he was bankrupted and had to sell his house. The IRD eventually conceded that he did not owe it NZ$924,341, and fraud charges against him were dropped. They also admitted that they owed him NZ$64,000. This experience led him to write a book Be Very Afraid: One Man's Stand Against the IRD. In 2007 his story was made into a film by South Pacific Pictures, entitled We're Here To Help.

Henderson's company, Property Ventures Limited is undertook a number of developments including the billion dollar new town, Five Mile, in Queenstown. This failed and the resulting site was known as "Hendo's hole".

In November 2007 saw the opening in Christchurch of a new style of hotel named HotelSO. This building, acquired by Henderson in 2004, was occupied by the Inland Revenue Department.

Applications were made in the High Court at Christchurch on 16 May 2008 to have Mr Henderson's Five Mile Holdings and Property Ventures placed in liquidation.

In early August 2008, the Christchurch City Council held a short-notice urgent meeting about sensitive central city property purchases, then on 8 August 2008 announced that it would buy five of Henderson's properties for approximately NZ$17 million. Henderson was to have first option to buy back the properties. This decision caused much civic controversy.

The High Court in Christchurch placed Henderson in bankruptcy on 29 November 2010.
