= Frank Dickson (banker) =

New Zealand banker (1931–2023)

Frank Dickson MBE
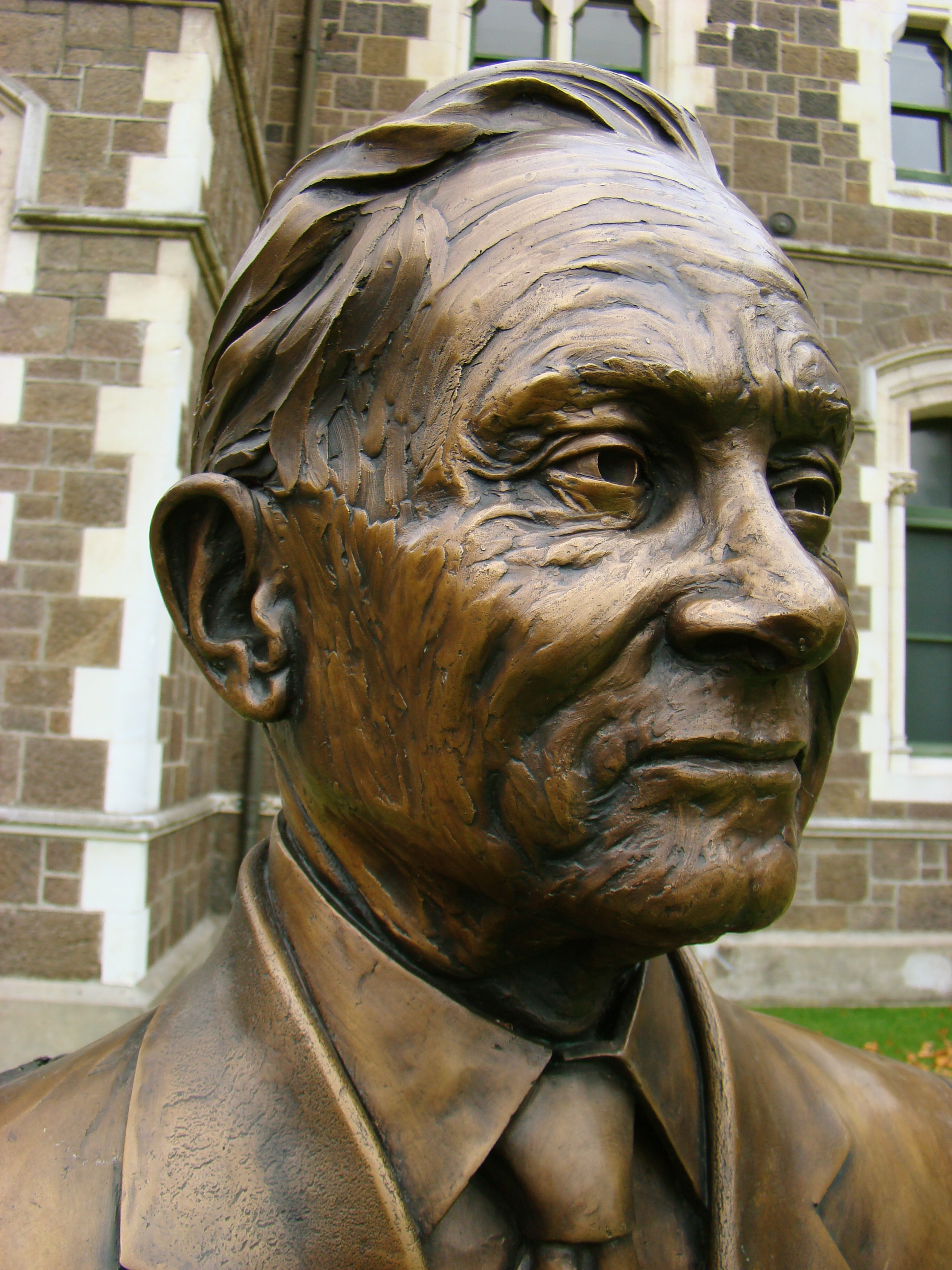
- Bust (2009) by Mark Whyte, recognising Dickson as one of Twelve Local Heroes in Christchurch
- Born: 11 May 1931; Auckland, New Zealand
- Died: 2 March 2023 (aged 91); Christchurch, New Zealand
- Occupation: Banking executive
- Employer: Canterbury Savings Bank
- Spouse: Alison Rae Patterson (m. 1958; died 2021)
- Children: 3

Frank Dickson MBE (11 May 1931 – 2 March 2023) was a New Zealand banker. He was the first chief executive of the Canterbury Savings Bank (later Trust Bank Canterbury), from 1963 to 1988.

== Biography ==
Dickson was born in the Auckland suburb of Birkenhead on 11 May 1931, the son of Mavis Ellen Dickson (née Smith) and James Dickson. In 1958, he married Alison Rae Patterson, and the couple went on to have three children.

Dickson joined the Auckland Savings Bank in 1950, and rose to become the new business manager for the bank by 1962. In 1963, he was appointed manager (chief executive) of the newly established Canterbury Savings Bank, based in Christchurch, and remained in that role until 1988.

In the 1989 Queen's Birthday Honours, Dickson was appointed a Member of the Order of the British Empire, for services to banking and the community. In March 2009, he was commemorated as one of Christchurch's Twelve Local Heroes, and a bust of Dickson, sculpted by Mark Whyte, was unveiled at the Christchurch Arts Centre.

Dickson's wife, Rae, died in 2021. Dickson died in Christchurch on 2 March 2023, at the age of 91.
