= Diana Isaac =

New Zealand conservationist and businesswoman

Diana Isaac ONZM QSM
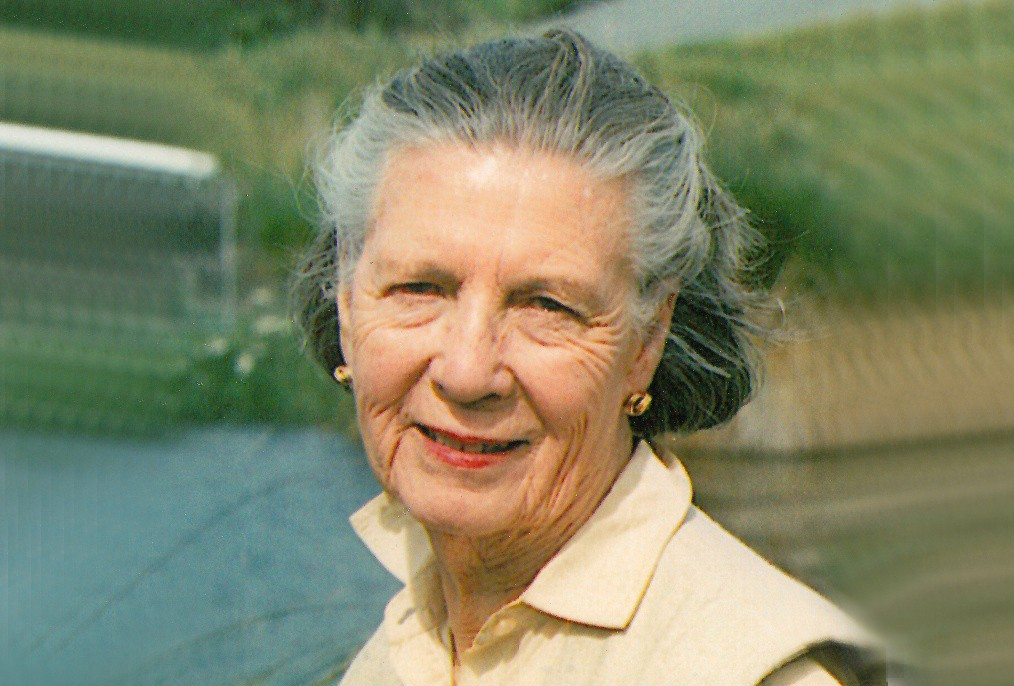
- Born: Edna Marie Gilbert; 2 September 1921; Devon, England
- Died: 23 November 2012 (aged 91); Christchurch, New Zealand
- Years active: 1947–2012
- Spouse: Neil Isaac (m. 1946; died 1987)
- Relatives: Catherine Isaac (niece)

Diana Isaac, Lady Isaac ONZM QSM (born Edna Marie Gilbert; 2 September 1921 – 23 November 2012) was a New Zealand conservationist, businesswoman, philanthropist and arts patron who supported a wide range of projects within Canterbury. She was best known for co-founding and running Isaac Construction with her husband Sir Neil Isaac.

== Biography ==
Isaac was born in Devon in 1921 and raised in England. She joined the British Army during World War II and was on a troopship bound for India when she met Neil Isaac from Timaru. They married at the Church of the Redemption in New Delhi in 1946. She worked for the army in India for three years while in her 20s before settling in Christchurch with her husband in 1950, where they founded Isaac Construction that year. There was a two-year period from 1956 to 1958 when a person married to a New Zealander could obtain a New Zealand passport, which Isaac made use of. She officially became a New Zealand citizen in a private ceremony held by the mayor of Christchurch, Bob Parker, at her home at Mcleans Island in October 2012.

She was the aunt of Catherine Isaac.

== Contributions and recognition ==
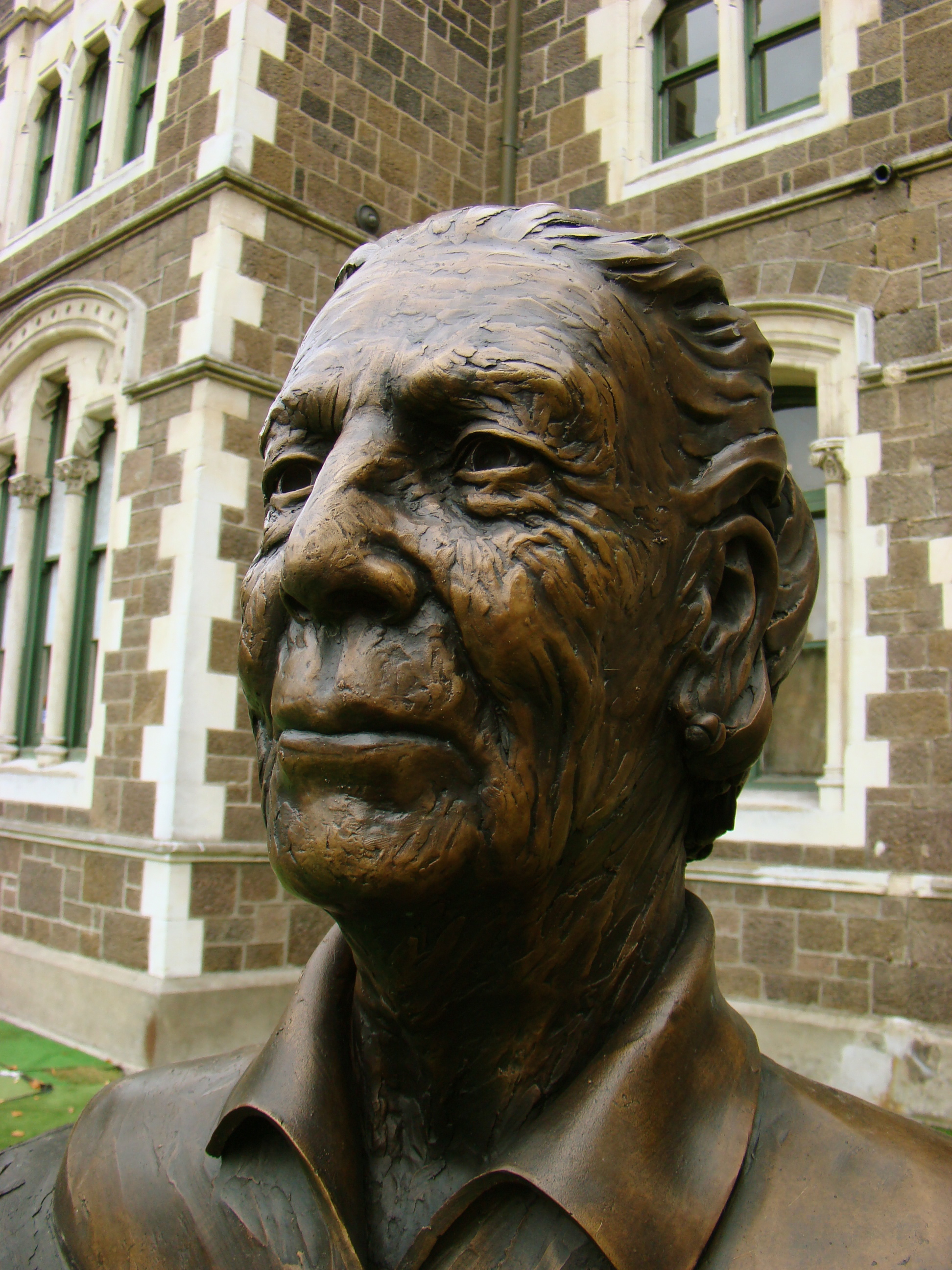
Bronze bust of Isaac as part of the Twelve Local Heroes sculpture

Isaac contributed to Canterbury through the creation of scholarships at Lincoln and Canterbury universities, sponsoring the Isaac Theatre Royal, supporting the Christchurch Art Gallery and setting up the Isaac Centre for Nature Conservation. She was also the main driving force behind the creation of Peacock Springs, a wildlife sanctuary on the outskirts of Christchurch.

Isaac was awarded the Queen's Service Medal for community service in the 1990 Queen's Birthday Honours, and became an Officer of the New Zealand Order of Merit in the 2009 New Year Honours, for services to business, conservation and the community. In March 2009, Isaac was commemorated as one of the Twelve Local Heroes for her work in Christchurch, and a bronze bust of her was unveiled outside the Christchurch Arts Centre.

In 2010 she was one of three finalists for Senior New Zealander of the Year.

She died at home on 23 November 2012. Catherine Isaac and Dame Malvina Major spoke at her funeral, which was held at the Church of St Michael and All Angels in the Christchurch Central City, with Bishop Victoria Matthews officiating.
