= Michael Crozier =

New Zealand physicist and politician (1937–2012)

5th President of ACT New Zealand
- In office 2009–2010
- Vice President: Dave Moore (2009–2010); Bruce Haycock (2010–2011)
- Leader: Rodney Hide
- Preceded by: Garry Mallett
- Succeeded by: Chris Simmons

Personal details
- Born: Michael Henry Crozier; 8 June 1937
- Died: 21 July 2012 (aged 75)
- Party: ACT
- Scientific career
- Education: University of Canterbury
- Fields: Physics
- Thesis: The spectra of rare ions in crystals (1962)

Michael Henry Crozier (8 June 1937 – 21 July 2012) was a New Zealand politician and physicist. He was the fifth president of ACT New Zealand, a libertarian right-wing political party.

Crozier was elected as the ACT New Zealand president in March 2009, defeating Chris Simmons. Crozier resigned five months before his two-year term was to finish to take a long-planned trip to Europe with his wife. Chris Simmons was confirmed as the new president by the ACT New Zealand board on 21 October 2010.

Crozier had a PhD in physics, and was chief scientist at the Ministry of Defence. He died on 21 July 2012.

Party political offices
Preceded by Garry Mallett	President of ACT New Zealand; 2006–2009	Succeeded by Chris Simmons
