= John Dalhoff =

John Dalhoff, a.k.a. John Ultimate (29 January 1944–27 August 2001) was the founder of the organisation 'Zenith Applied Philosophy' (ZAP) based in Christchurch, New Zealand.

While studying at Massey University in the early 1960s Dalhoff became involved with the Church of Scientology and in 1965 he went to the Saint Hill Manor Scientology Centre in the United Kingdom, returning to New Zealand as a full-time scientology worker. However, in 1972 he was expelled from the Church for "failure to comply with the ethical codes of the Church of Scientology". In August 1974 he declared that he had reached the "Ultimate State" and on 7 September that year he publicly announced that he was "John Ultimate" and that his Christchurch home was the centre of the universe.

During the 1970s and 1980s Dalhoff ran ZAP from his home and received an income from ZAP members paying a percentage of their wages as well as fees from ZAP courses, income from ZAP businesses and penalties imposed on ZAP members.

== Quotes ==
"I am above nothing or below nothing. I am not god, and I have no wish to go down to that level."

"...Jesus talked about being the son of God but no-one has talked about attaining the ultimate state. This has been obtained here at the centre of the universe... I am the ultimate now I have talked to many people recently in other places though different means (e.g in their dreams, on their telephones). Many people from other places are now on the way to the centre of the universe..."
