= ACT New Zealand =

New Zealand political party

ACT New Zealand Rōpū ACT
- Leader: David Seymour
- Deputy leader: Nicole McKee
- President: John Windsor
- Founders: Roger Douglas; Derek Quigley
- Founded: 1994; 32 years ago
- Split from: New Zealand Labour Party
- Headquarters: 27 Gillies Avenue, Newmarket, Auckland
- Student wing: Young ACT (Note: An associated youth organisation, not officially connected to the party.)
- Local wing: ACT Local
- Ideology: Classical liberalism; Right-libertarianism; Conservatism
- Political position: Right-wing
- Colours: Yellow; Cyan; Magenta
- Slogan: Unlock New Zealand's potential
- House of Representatives: 11 / 123
- Regional councillors: 2 / 132
- Local councillors: 6 / 718

Website
- act.org.nz

ACT New Zealand (Māori: Rōpū ACT), also known as the ACT Party or simply ACT, is a right-wing, classical liberal, right-libertarian, and conservative political party in New Zealand. It is currently led by David Seymour.

ACT is an acronym of the name of the Association of Consumers and Taxpayers, a pressure group that was founded in 1993 by former National Party MP Derek Quigley and former Labour Party MP Roger Douglas, who served as minister of finance under the Fourth Labour Government. Douglas' neoliberal economic policies, dubbed Rogernomics, transformed New Zealand's economy from a protectionist one into a free market through extensive deregulation.

After Labour lost the 1990 election and its neoliberal faction lost influence, ACT was built mostly by Douglas' former party supporters as a new political party for 1996. The introduction of proportional representation gave minor parties a greatly increased chance of getting into parliament. Former Labour MP Richard Prebble won the safe Labour seat of Wellington Central and led ACT to win 6% of the vote in the first MMP election. He continued as ACT party leader from after the election until 2004 when he was succeeded by Rodney Hide. ACT was briefly led by former National Party leader Don Brash for the 2011 election, after which the party caucus was reduced to one seat. It continued as a single-MP party based out of the Epsom electorate until 2020.

ACT supported the Fifth National Government in confidence and supply from 2008 to 2017. It is currently one of the three parties in the National-led coalition government established in 2023.

== History ==
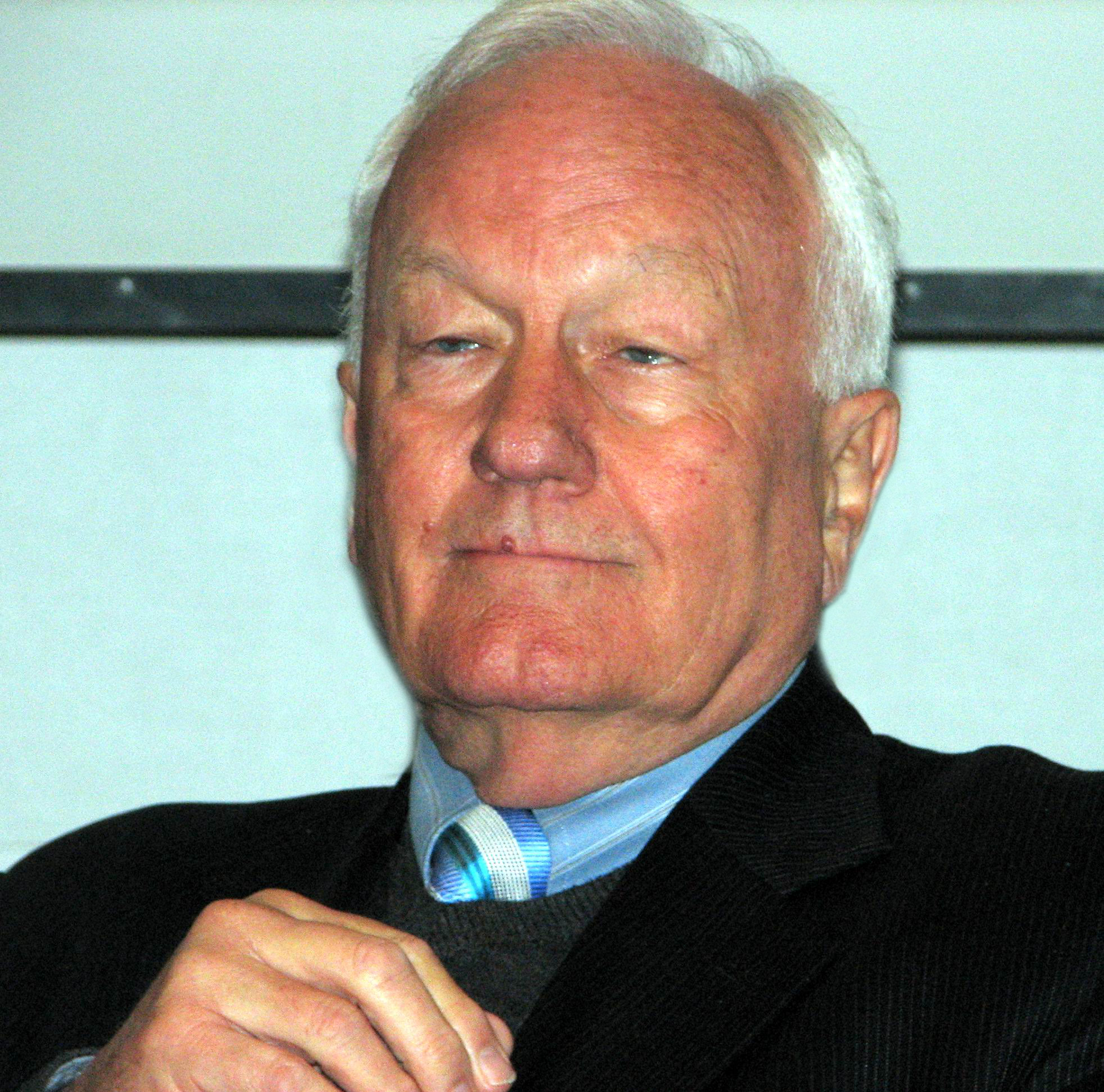
Former Minister of Finance Sir Roger Douglas was the party's first leader.

=== Formation ===
The name comes from the initials of the Association of Consumers and Taxpayers, founded in 1993 by Sir Roger Douglas and Derek Quigley. Douglas and Quigley intended the Association to serve as a pressure-group promoting Rogernomics—the name given to the radical free-market policies implemented by Douglas as Minister of Finance between 1984 and 1988. The Association grew out of the 'Backbone club', a ginger group in the Labour Party that supported Douglas and his policies. In 1996, New Zealand switched to using the MMP electoral system. The new electoral system gave smaller groups a much better chance of entering Parliament, and encouraged the Association to transform into a political party and contest elections. The nascent party's manifesto was based upon a book written by Douglas entitled Unfinished Business. Douglas served as ACT's first leader, but soon stood aside for Richard Prebble (his old ally from their days in the Labour Party).

=== 1996–2004: Prebble's leadership ===
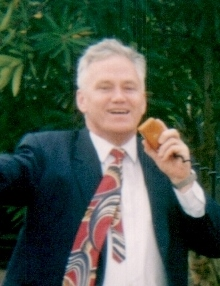
Richard Prebble led ACT from 1996 to 2004.

Under Douglas, ACT had languished at 1% in opinion polls, but with Prebble's populist rhetoric the party increased in support. In the 1996 election, ACT fielded 56 list candidates. Prebble won the Wellington Central electorate, and with 6.10% of the total party vote, ACT also sent seven list MPs to the 45th New Zealand Parliament.

In the 1999 election, ACT obtained 7.04% of the party vote, making it eligible for nine list MPs.

In the 2002 election, ACT obtained 7.14% of the party vote, making it eligible for nine list MPs.

On 2 December 2004, both Douglas and Quigley announced that they would step down as patrons of ACT. They stated as the reason that they wished to have more freedom to disagree with the party publicly.

=== 2005 election ===
Prebble's sudden departure from the leadership of ACT in 2004 signalled a decline in the party's electoral fortunes. Rodney Hide led ACT into the 2005 election. It obtained 1.51% of the party vote, but due to Hide winning the seat of Epsom, it did not need to obtain the necessary 5% threshold of the party vote. This was only enough to allow one list MP Heather Roy, to join Hide in parliament.

=== 2008–2011: First term in government ===
In the 2008 New Zealand general election, ACT fielded 61 list candidates, starting with Rodney Hide, Heather Roy, Sir Roger Douglas, John Boscawen, David Garrett and Hilary Calvert. The election marked an improvement in ACT's fortunes. Hide retained his Epsom seat and ACT's share of the party vote increased to 3.65% (up from the 1.5% gained in the 2005 election). The combination allowed the party five MPs in total.

In addition, the National Party won the most seats overall, forming a minority government, the Fifth National Government of New Zealand, with the support of ACT as well as the Māori Party and United Future. John Key offered both Hide and Roy posts as Ministers outside Cabinet: Hide became Minister of Local Government, Minister for Regulatory Reform and Associate Minister of Commerce, while Roy became Minister of Consumer Affairs, Associate Minister of Defence and Associate Minister of Education.

After 2008, some caucus MPs and organisational members became dissatisfied with ACT's coalition partner status and argued at ACT's national conference (27 February 2010) that there were insufficient fiscal responsibility policy gains for their party and that the National Party had slid from its earlier commitment to the politics of fiscal responsibility over the course of the previous decade. Throughout 2009, there had been at least one reported ACT caucus coup attempt against Hide's leadership, believed to have been led by Deputy Leader Heather Roy and Roger Douglas. However, it faltered when Prime Minister Key supported Hide's retention and threatened a snap election. In addition, the party's polling of a lowly one to two percent in most opinion polls meant only Heather Roy might accompany Hide after any forthcoming general election, if Hide retained ACT's Epsom pivotal electorate seat.

On 28 April 2011, Hide announced that he was resigning the ACT leadership in favour of former National Party leader and Reserve Bank Governor Don Brash who joined the party that morning. Brash's leadership was unanimously approved by the party board and parliamentary caucus on 30 April. Brash promised to focus the party on controlling government debt, equality between Māori and non-Māori, and rethinking the Emissions Trading Scheme, with a target of getting 15 percent of the party vote in the next election.

In November 2011, a recording of a conversation held between John Key and the former National Party member and former Mayor of Auckland City John Banks, who had been selected as the new ACT candidate in Epsom, was leaked to Herald on Sunday. 3 News also obtained copies of the recording suggesting the two politicians were discussing issues related to ACT New Zealand's leadership. Media dubbed the affair teapot tape.

=== 2011 election: Decline ===
In the 2011 New Zealand general election, ACT fielded 55 list candidates, starting with new leader Don Brash, Catherine Isaac, Don Nicolson, John Banks, David Seymour and Chris Simmons. The election was a disappointment for ACT, with the party's worst election result since it began in 1996. John Banks retained the Epsom seat for ACT, however the 34.2% majority held by Rodney Hide was severely cut back to 6.3% as large numbers of Labour and Green voters in Epsom tactically split their vote and gave their electorate vote to the National candidate Paul Goldsmith. Nationwide, ACT received only 1.07% of the party vote, placing eighth out of 13 on party vote percentage. As a result, ACT were only entitled to one seat in the new Parliament, filled by John Banks. Subsequently, Don Brash announced that he had stepped down as leader during his speech on election night. Following the 2011 general election John Banks stated that he believed that the ACT brand "...just about had its use-by date..." and needed to be renamed and relaunched.

Their previous partners, the National Party, again won the most seats overall, and formed a minority government. The Fifth National Government of New Zealand had ACT support as well as that of United Future and the Māori Party, providing the coalition with confidence and supply.

=== 2014 election ===
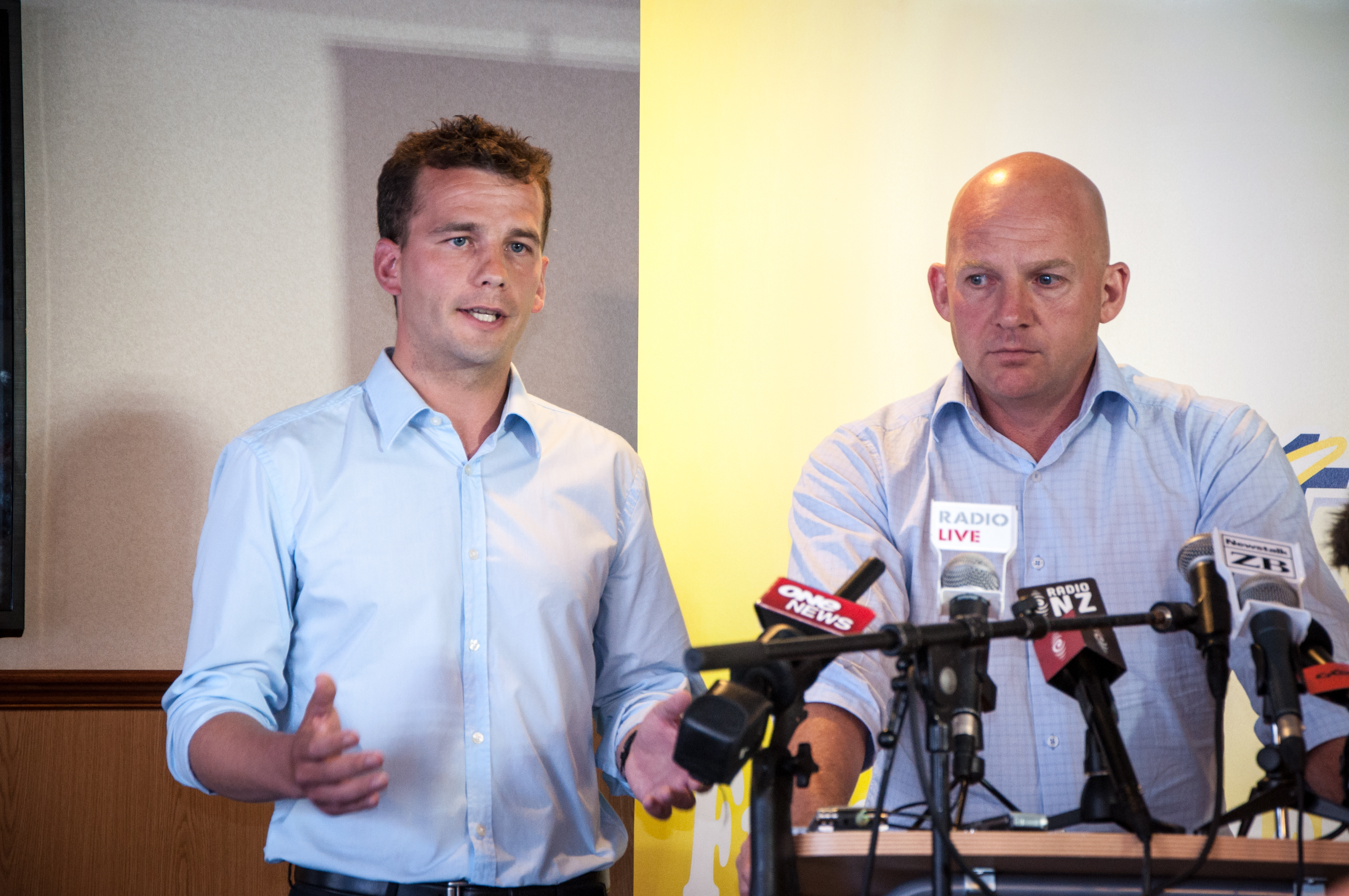
David Seymour and Jamie Whyte in February 2014

ACT leader John Banks announced in December of 2013 that he would retire at the next election and stand down as party leader, to focus on contesting allegations of electoral fraud in court. Three candidates declared their intention to replace Banks: John Boscawen and Jamie Whyte stood to replace him both as ACT leader and Epsom candidate, while David Seymour only stood for the latter role. In February 2014, the ACT board announced they had selected Whyte as the party's leader and Seymour as their candidate for Epsom. Whyte, who had only recently returned to the country, had a degree in philosophy and was a noted writer and columnist in Britain. Seymour first stood for the party in 2005, and was employed by a Canadian think tank at the time of his selection. Boscawen had strongly opposed selecting separate candidates for the leadership and Epsom, and resigned as party president after the announcement.

Later in the month, Whyte stated to the blog The Ruminator that he did not believe consensual incestuous relationships should be illegal. Whyte initially defended his statement, which he said did not reflect party policy. However, Whyte said the following day that he had regretted the comments.

Party logo adopted in 2014

At the party's conference in March, Whyte announced ACT's support for a three strikes policy for burglary, and for reviewing and replacing the Resource Management Act. A new yellow logo was also introduced for the party. Kenneth Wang, previously a list MP for ACT, was elected as the deputy leader by the party board in April. Whyte said in July that he would stand in the Pakuranga electorate, although he would only campaign for the party vote.

In late July, Whyte called for the abolition of laws based on race, saying that Māori enjoyed legal privilege akin to that of the aristocracy in pre-revolutionary France. Susan Devoy, the Race Relations Commissioner, described Whyte's statement as "grotesque and inflammatory". Whyte called for her resignation in response, describing Devoy's comment as electoral interference, and for the abolition of the Race Relations Commissioner. He named Fiji's removal of race-based laws as a prospective model for New Zealand. Whyte's comments on race relations caused Guy McCallum, an ACT board member and candidate in Dunedin North, to resign from the party.

At the 2014 election, Seymour won the Epsom electorate, but ACT's party vote of 0.69% was not high enough to elect a list MP. National Party leader and prime minister John Key had encouraged his party's supporters in Epsom to vote for Seymour. Most National party voters in Epsom followed his recommendation and split their vote, with 60 per cent giving their candidate vote to Seymour.

ACT agreed to support the National government for a third term, with Seymour being named parliamentary under-secretary to the education and regulatory reform ministers. Whyte resigned as party leader on 3 October, and was replaced by Seymour.

=== 2017–2020 term: resurgence ===
Wang resigned as deputy leader on 9 July 2017, the same day ACT released its party list; Beth Houlbrooke was announced as his replacement.

The Free Democratic Party logo adopted after 2013, and ACT's new logo adopted in 2019.

The party list had 39 candidates, none of whom were elected. While Seymour retained the Epsom electorate, entitling him to a seat in parliament, ACT received 0.5% of the party vote, its worst result to date. Following the 2017 election, Seymour considered rebranding the party to the Liberals. Amidst this, Seymour visited Berlin in 2018 as a guest of the Friedrich Naumann Foundation, which is affiliated to the Free Democratic Party (FDP). Ideologically similar to ACT, the FDP had lost its seats in Germany's Bundestag in 2013, but returned at the 2017 election after a rebrand. In June 2019, ACT changed its party logo to closely resemble the FDP's, with the addition of the colour magenta.

As the party's political prospects languished, Seymour accepted an invitation to appear on the television show Dancing with the Stars in late 2017. His performance on the show, where he twerked in neon lycra, was described by Toby Manhire of The Spinoff as "hapless" but ultimately successful in raising Seymour's public profile. Following the Christchurch mosque shootings, Seymour was the only member of parliament to oppose a ban on semi-automatic rifles. ACT's support among the gun-owning community of New Zealand rose as a result, with firearms advocate Nicole McKee joining the party. Andrea Vance of Stuff described the NZ First party's support of the firearm reforms as a strategic error, which allowed for ACT to gain support. Both Manhire and Grant Duncan in The Conversation state that ACT's rise in support came in part from NZ First supporters dissatisfied with the Labour government.

Seymour had also introduced the End of Life Choice Bill to parliament, which would allow for voluntary euthanasia. Brooke van Velden, then a staffer and later ACT's deputy leader, helped to promote the bill. The bill passed in November 2019, was approved in a 2020 referendum, and came into effect in late 2021.

By the start of 2020, ACT's support in opinion polls still remained negligible. However, Seymour was appointed as a member of the Epidemic Response Committee as the COVID-19 pandemic began. Seymour was a sharp critic of the government's handling of the pandemic, in contrast to a more muddled stance from the National Party. ACT supported the reopening of international borders, and cited Taiwan, which had adopted extensive contact tracing, as an example to follow for New Zealand. While he did not support a herd immunity response to the pandemic, Seymour was sceptical of the efficacy of lockdowns. Meanwhile, National faced internal strife, having replaced its leader after his criticisms of COVID-19 policy, electing Todd Muller as leader, who would resign after 57 days, leading to Judith Collins' elevation. By August, a Colmar Brunton poll had shown ACT at close to 5% support, which would see the party elect six MPs. In advance of the election in October, ACT was at 8% support in polls.

The party's list for the 2020 election was announced on 28 June. Van Velden was announced as the party's new deputy and placed in the second spot on the list, while McKee was placed third.

=== 2020–2023 term ===
Following the election, held on 17 October (postponed from September), ACT increased their share of the party vote to 7.6%, winning 10 seats including Seymour's Epsom seat and nine from the party list. This was the party's best-ever result.

In late April 2021, the ACT party sponsored motion asking the New Zealand Parliament to debate and vote on the issue of human rights abuses against the Uyghur ethnic minority community in China's Xinjiang province. In early May, the incumbent Labour Party revised the motion to raise concerns about human rights abuses in Xinjiang but omitting the term genocide, which was subsequently adopted by the New Zealand Parliament on 5 May. In response, the Chinese Embassy claimed that the motion made "groundless accusations" of human rights abuses against China and constituted an interference in China's internal affairs.

On 19 May 2021, the ACT Party opposed Green Party MP Golriz Ghahraman's motion calling for members of parliament to recognise the rights of Palestinians to self-determination and statehood while reaffirming its support for a two-state solution to the Israel-Palestine conflict. Deputy Leader Van Velden justified ACT's opposition to the Green motion on the basis of Green MP Ricardo Menéndez March's tweet that said "From the river to the sea, Palestine will be free!."

=== 2023–present: Coalition with National ===
Final results of the 2023 general election indicated that ACT had won 8.64% of the party vote, resulting in 9 parliamentary list seats; Seymour also retained his Epsom seat and Deputy Leader Brooke van Velden won the Tāmaki electorate for a total of 11 seats. In November 2023, ACT entered into a coalition with the National party to form part of the Sixth National Government of New Zealand.

As part of National's coalition agreement with ACT, the Government would adopt ACT's policies of restoring interest-deductibility for rental properties and permitting pet bonds. In addition to adopting National's policies on youth crime and on gangs, the new Government would adopt ACT's policies of rewriting firearms legislation. The new Government would also scrap the previous Labour Government's fair-pay agreements, proposed hate-speech legislation, co-governance policies, Auckland light rail, Three Waters reform programme, and the Māori Health Authority. The Government would also establish a new Ministry for Regulation, headed by Seymour, that would review the quality of new and existing legislation. While National did not support ACT's proposed referendum on the principles of the Treaty of Waitangi, the Government would introduce a Treaty Principles Bill and amend existing Treaty of Waitangi legislation to focus on the "original intent of the legislation".

Within the National-led coalition government, Seymour became the first Minister for Regulation and was designated as Deputy Prime Minister from 31 May 2025. Van Velden became Minister of Internal Affairs and Minister for Workplace Relations and Safety. Nicole McKee became Minister for Courts and Associate Minister of Justice (firearms). Andrew Hoggard was appointed as Minister for Biosecurity and Food Safety while Karen Chhour was appointed as Minister for Children and Minister for the Prevention of Family and Sexual Violence. Simon Court was appointed as Parliamentary Under-Secretary for the Minister for Infrastructure and RMA Reform.

On 7 February 2024, the ACT Party launched a campaign to support its Treaty Principles Bill, aiming to "restore the meaning of the Treaty of Waitangi to what was actually written and signed in 1840". ACT also reiterated its call for a referendum on the Treaty's application if the bill progresses past the initial stages. Opposition to the bill included criticism from Te Pāti Māori co-leader Debbie Ngarewa-Packer, who accused Seymour of deliberately trying to divide New Zealand, and from outgoing Labour MP Kelvin Davis, who stated that his party would continue to oppose the "Pākehā Government spiders".

On 7 June 2024, Stuff journalist Tova O'Brien reported that allegations of intimidation, unfair treatment of women and a "trainwreck campaign" within the ACT party had led six staff members and volunteers to resign following the 2023 general election. In addition, the party's board was facing a vote of no-confidence. Complainants likened elements of the 2023 election campaign to the Hunger Games; they alleged bullying of candidates and of volunteers. In response to the allegations, the ACT party confirmed that it had conducted an independent review into its campaign. The party's president Catherine Isaac stated that the party had accepted the review's recommendations and acknowledged that political campaigns could be stressful on people, who also had to balance their lives and careers. During ACT's annual rally on 9 June, Seymour downplayed allegations of a "culture of fear" within the ACT party and reiterated the party's support for the review's recommendations. In his speech, Seymour said that the party's support had grown by 1,000 percent in the past five years; he set out a 15% voter target for the 2026 general election.

In early July 2024, ACT invoked the "agree-to-disagree" provision of its coalition agreement after the National-led government decided to progress the Fair Digital News Bargaining Bill, which had been introduced by the previous Labour Government. In late February 2025, the Government agreed to support the ACT party's proposed legislation to extend New Zealand's parliamentary term from three years to four years. In mid-March 2025, Seymour confirmed that ACT would field candidates during the 2025 New Zealand local elections, marking the first time the party would contest local-body elections.

On 6 May 2025 ACT declined to support the National Party's proposed legislation forcing social-media platforms to restrict access for users under the age of 16 years. Consequently, National was unable to introduce the legislation as a government bill and had to introduce it as a member's bill. On 11 May, ACT invoked the "agree-to-disagree" clause of its coalition agreement after the National Party declined to support McKee's call for a review of the New Zealand government's firearms registry, and for a more "thorough and independent" review be conducted for the 2025-2026 financial year.

On 31 May 2025, David Seymour succeeded Winston Peters as deputy prime minister, under the terms of the 2023 coalition agreement. He became the first ACT deputy prime minister.

In June 2025, the party announced their first candidates for the 2025 local elections, who campaigned under the ACT Local banner. Logistics manager James Ebbett would run for the Central Hawke's Bay District Council, retired pharmacist David Ross for the Tasman District Council, and local businessman Nathan Atkins for the Waimakariri District Council.

In late January 2026, ACT opposed the introduction of new legislation targeting modern slavery, citing increased compliance-costs and ineffectiveness, and attributing the bill to "virtue signalling". National and Labour subsequently announced they would co-sponsor a new bill targeting modern slavery.

In late June 2026, the associate justice minister Nicole McKee became ACT's deputy leader during the party's annual general meeting in Auckland.

== Principles ==
According to former party leader Rodney Hide, ACT's values are "individual freedom, personal responsibility, doing the best for our natural environment and for smaller, smarter government in its goals of a prosperous economy, a strong society, and a quality of life that is the envy of the world". ACT states that it adheres to classical-liberal and small (or limited) government principles coupled with what the party considers as a high regard for individual freedom and personal responsibility. ACT sets out its values:

- The principal object of the Party is to promote an open and benevolent society in which individual New Zealanders are free to achieve their full potential.
- That individuals are the rightful owners of their own lives and therefore have inherent freedoms and responsibilities.
- That the proper purpose of government is to protect such freedoms and not to assume such responsibilities.
- All people should be equal before the law regardless of race, gender, sexuality, religion or political belief.
- Freedom of expression is essential to a free society and must be promoted, protected and preserved without restriction other than for incitement, criminal nuisance or defamation.
- Citizenship and permanent residency should be subject to applicants affirming New Zealand's values.

== Policies and ideology ==
ACT has described itself as 'The Liberal Party'.

ACT has been characterised as a conservative, classical liberal and libertarian party. ACT's platform featured conservative populist policies under former leaders Richard Prebble (in office: 1996–2004) and Rodney Hide (2004–2011). Under the leadership of David Seymour (in office from 2014 onwards), commentators have identified a shift in policy to a more libertarian outlook. Although Seymour has stated that he does not view populism as the way to govern a country or to stimulate growth, market populism remained a prominent part of his and the ACT party's 2023 election campaign. The ACT Party emphasises the importance of property rights. (Note: However, in 2024 ACT successfully promoted policy reducing the property rights of landlords.)

ACT wants to reduce or remove some government programmes which it sees as unnecessary and wasteful, and to increase self-reliance by encouraging individuals to take responsibility to pay for services traditionally paid for by governments. Under leader Rodney Hide, ACT New Zealand had primarily focused on two main policy areas: taxation and crime (law-and-order issues). At the 2011 general election, ACT advocated lowering tax rates and also supported something approaching a flat tax, in which tax rates would not be graduated based on wealth or income, so that every taxpayer would pay the same proportion of their income in tax. The flat tax-rate that ACT proposed was approximately 15%, with no tax on the first $25,000 for those who opt out of state-provided accident, sickness and healthcare cover. As at 2021, the party proposed reducing GST and decreasing the marginal tax rate paid by those on the median wage, but did not advocate a flat tax rate.

During the 2020 general election, the ACT party campaigned on a broad policy platform. It prioritised economic recovery (see: COVID-19 pandemic in New Zealand § Long-term effects), keeping national debt low, and signing up to a CANZUK agreement which would enable free movement of people and goods between the United Kingdom, New Zealand, Canada and Australia. The party wants to protect freedom of expression and to limit funding for universities that do not uphold freedom of speech on campus. It supports immigration while it calls for compulsory measures for immigrants to assimilate and for limiting citizenship or permanent-residency status to those who pledge to uphold the values of New Zealand.

=== Law and order ===
On its website, ACT states that rights should not depend on ancestry, and that they stand for "one law for all". The party has a number of tough-on-crime policies focused primarily on trying to control gangs. Party leader, David Seymour, has supported the "three strikes law," reimposing it after its repeal in 2022. ACT advocates repealing New Zealand's 2019 firearms legislation, and taking a "tougher" stance on criminals who repeatedly offend and on those found guilty of violent crimes, while also supporting rehabilitation programs.

In September 2022, the ACT Party proposed fitting ankle bracelets on young offenders aged between 11 and 14 to combat juvenile crime, particularly ram-raiding. Party leader Seymour argued that ankle bracelets were non-intrusive and would allow police to monitor young offenders. In response, Police Minister Chris Hipkins stated that the Labour Government was not considering the use of ankle bracelets for young offenders but would keep "all options on the table". National Party leader Christopher Luxon and education spokesperson Erica Stanford initially indicated that they would not support ACT's ankle-bracelet policy, with Stanford describing it as "heartbreaking". New Zealand rugby-league player Sir Graham Lowe criticised the ankle-bracelet policy, while Waikato retailer Ash Parmer supported it. In November 2022, National reversed its initial opposition to fitting young offenders with ankle bracelets; with justice spokesperson Paul Goldsmith stating that a law change was necessary to impose electronic monitoring or intensive supervision on child offenders aged under 12 years.

In May 2023, Seymour announced that ACT, if elected into government, would build youth-detention centres run by the Department of Corrections. ACT's proposed policies include shifting management of youth offenders from Oranga Tamariki (the Ministry for Children) to the Corrections Department, investing NZ$677 million into combating youth crime over the following four years – including NZ$500 million on the construction of 200 new "youth justice beds", and $44 million per year to operate these facilities.

=== Social issues ===
Members of ACT's caucus in parliament voted five to four in favour of the Civil Union Act 2004 which gave the option of legal recognition to (among others) same-sex couples. A majority within the caucus also supported the legalisation of brothels by the Prostitution Reform Act 2003. In 2005, both of ACT's MPs, Rodney Hide and Heather Roy, voted for the Marriage (Gender Clarification) Amendment Bill 2005, which would have banned the possibility of introducing same-sex marriage in New Zealand in the future perspective.

In 2013, leader John Banks (the party's sole MP from 2011 to 2014) voted in favour of the Marriage (Definition of Marriage) Amendment Bill at its third reading, a law which legalised same-sex marriage in New Zealand.

ACT leader David Seymour supported the legalisation of assisted dying. In 2018, he introduced a member's bill, the End of Life Choice Bill, which aimed to legalise euthanasia in New Zealand. The law passed in 2019, was approved by the public in a 2020 referendum, and took full effect in 2021. Grant Duncan cited the euthanasia law as an example of ACT neoliberalism. In 2020, Seymour voted for the Abortion Legislation Act which introduced abortion on request. However, he criticised a particular aspect of this law which created "free protest zones" which would ban protests near abortion clinics, saying this limits freedom of expression. In 2021, ACT expressed support for liberalisation of surrogacy law so as to facilitate availability of surrogate services to heterosexual and same-sex couples as well. (Currently, New Zealand law permits altruistic surrogacy only.)

=== Māori issues ===
ACT proposes abolition of the Māori electorate seats in the New Zealand Parliament, arguing the seats are "an anachronism and offensive to the principle of equal citizenship" and that Māori MPs have been elected in general elections on other lists without special assistance. The party also wants to reduce the number of MPs in parliament from 120 to 100.

In March 2022, ACT campaigned on holding a referendum on Māori co-governance arrangements as a condition for entering into coalition with the National Party. Seymour has argued that the 1840 Treaty of Waitangi was not a partnership between the New Zealand Crown and Māori, and that co-governance arrangements created resentment and division. In addition, ACT announced that it would introduce a new law defining the principles of the Treaty of Waitangi if elected into government following the 2023 election. This law would only come into effect following a referendum held at the 2026 general election. ACT's proposed referendum and law would affect co-governance arrangements at several Crown Research Institutes, state-owned enterprises and healthcare providers such as Te Aka Whai Ora (the Māori Health Authority). However, Seymour indicated that the new law would preserve existing co-governance arrangements with the Waikato, Ngāi Tahu, Tūhoe and Whanganui iwi (tribes).

Māori Party co-leader Debbie Ngarewa-Packer and Professor Linda Tuhiwai Smith described ACT's proposed co-governance referendum and policies as being motivated by racism and reflecting a Pākehā unwillingness to share power. Similarly, Waikato leader Rahui Papa claimed that ACT's co-governance policies clashed with the second and third articles of the treaty which (he argued) guaranteed Māori participation in the social sector. In response, Prime Minister Jacinda Ardern reiterated her government's commitment to co-governance arrangements. Meanwhile, National Party leader Christopher Luxon refused to commit to a referendum on co-governance, but acknowledged that further clarity on co-governance was needed.

In October 2022, ACT released a discussion document entitled "Democracy or co-government?" which proposed a new Treaty Principles Act that would end the focus on partnership between Māori and the Crown and interpret "tino rangatiratanga" solely as property rights. By contrast, most scholars of the Māori language define "tino rangatiratanga" as the equivalent of "self-determination" in the English language. The proposed Treaty Principles Act does not mention Māori, the Crown, iwi (tribes), and hapū (subgroups) but refers only to "New Zealanders". ACT Party leader Seymour refused to identify whom his party had consulted when developing its co-governance and Treaty of Waitangi policies, particularly its redefinition of "tino rangatiratanga" as property rights. As part of ACT's non-racial (colour-blind) policies, its social-development spokesperson Karen Chhour advocated the abolition of Te Aka Whai Ora.

Following the 2023 election and the formation of a National-led coalition government, ACT embarked on a public information campaign in early February 2024 to promote its Treaty Principles Bill. This campaign includes the creation of a new website called "treaty.nz," which has a Questions and Answers section outlining the party's approach to the principles of the Treaty of Waitangi and a video featuring Seymour. Seymour also contested claims that the opposition was trying to rewrite or abolish the Treaty of Waitangi. The public information campaign also came after a leaked Justice Ministry memo claimed that the proposed bill clashed with the text of the Treaty.

=== Climate change ===
ACT went into the 2008 general election with a policy that in part stated "New Zealand is not warming" and that their policy goal was to ensure "That no New Zealand government will ever impose needless and unjustified taxation or regulation on its citizens in a misguided attempt to reduce global warming or become a world leader in carbon neutrality". In September 2008, ACT Party Leader Rodney Hide stated "that the entire climate change – global warming hypothesis is a hoax, that the data and the hypothesis do not hold together, that Al Gore is a phoney and a fraud on this issue, and that the emissions trading scheme is a worldwide scam and swindle." The former party leader has been branded as an "outspoken Kiwi climate change sceptic". In February 2016, ACT deleted this climate-change policy from their website, and party leader David Seymour criticised the Green Party for doing "bugger all for the environment".

ACT placed Chris Baillie fourth on its party list of candidates in the 2020 election; he has received criticism over his views on climate change, and been labelled a climate-change sceptic. In the runup to the 2020 election, Environmental Defence Society chief executive Gary Taylor said that even ACT had moved its position from where it had been. He was largely critical of the party, saying: "ACT have been very outspoken about wanting to go hard to repeal a lot of climate change legislation, and I haven't seen much from New Zealand First, mainly just silence." He also stated: "I think the only upside from ACT really on climate change is they do seem to have moved from outright deniers – which is where the party was five years ago. [With] a strong ACT presence you could expect some of their radical and unhelpful policies to potentially be implemented, and that is frankly a scary proposition."

In early December 2020, the New Zealand Parliament officially declared a climate emergency, of which ACT was critical, stating, "Today's climate emergency was a triumph for post-rational politics with feelings rather than facts driving the Government's response to climate change". The party supports repealing the 2019 "Zero Carbon Act".

=== Foreign policy ===
In 2019, ACT expressed sympathy with the Hong Kong pro-democracy protestors during the 2019–20 Hong Kong protests with party leader David Seymour speaking at a Hong Kong pro-democracy rally at the University of Auckland. The party argued that the New Zealand government should condemn efforts by the Chinese government to restrict freedom of speech in Hong Kong and criticised the Chinese Consulate-General for praising a Chinese student who had assaulted a pro-democracy activist in Auckland.

In response to the Gaza war, Seymour as ACT leader issued a statement in support of Israel and condemned Hamas terrorism. ACT also accused Labour Foreign Minister Nanaia Mahuta of not explicitly opposing Hamas' actions.

== Electoral performance ==
=== House of Representatives ===
Election	Leader	Votes	%	Seats	+/–	Position	Status
1996	Richard Prebble	126,442	6.10%	8 / 120	▲8	▲5th	Opposition (1996–1998)
1996	Richard Prebble	126,442	6.10%	8 / 120	▲8	▲5th	Confidence and supply (1998–1999)
1999	Richard Prebble	145,493	7.04%	9 / 120	▲1	▼4th	Opposition
2002	Richard Prebble	145,078	7.14%	9 / 120	Steady	4th	Opposition
2005	Rodney Hide	34,469	1.50%	2 / 121	▼7	▼7th	Opposition
2008	Rodney Hide	85,496	3.65%	5 / 122	▲3	▲4th	Confidence and supply
2011	Don Brash	23,889	1.07%	1 / 121	▼4	▼7th	Confidence and supply
2014	Jamie Whyte	16,689	0.69%	1 / 121	Steady	▲6th	Confidence and supply
2017	David Seymour	13,075	0.50%	1 / 120	Steady	▲5th	Opposition
2020	David Seymour	219,030	7.58%	10 / 120	▲9	▲4th	Opposition
2023	David Seymour	246,409	8.64%	11 / 123	▲1	4th	Coalition
2026	David Seymour	TBD	TBD	13 / 131	▲2	4th	TBD
Source: Electoral Commission

== Leadership ==
The ACT party board appoints a leader and deputy leader recommended by the party caucus; when the party leader is not a member of parliament, a separate parliamentary leader is chosen by the caucus. The organisation outside parliament is led by a party president and party vice-president.

=== Leaders ===
Image	Name	Term
	Roger Douglas	(1994–1996)
	Richard Prebble	(1996–2004)
	Rodney Hide	(2004–2011)
	Don Brash	(2011)
	John Banks	(2012–2014)
	Jamie Whyte	(2014)
	David Seymour	(2014–present)

=== Deputy leaders ===
- Ken Shirley (1994–2004)
- Muriel Newman (2004–2006)
- Heather Roy (2006–2010)
- John Boscawen (2010–c. 2012)
- Kenneth Wang (2014–2017)
- Beth Houlbrooke (2017–2020)
- Brooke van Velden (2020–2026)
- Nicole McKee (2026–present)

=== Parliamentary leaders ===
- No MPs (1994–1996)
- Richard Prebble (1996–2004)
- Rodney Hide (2004–2011)
- John Boscawen (2011)
- John Banks (2011–2014)
- David Seymour (2014–present)

=== Presidents ===
- Rodney Hide (1994–1996)
- Roger Douglas (1996–2001)
- Catherine Isaac (2001–2006)
- Garry Mallett (2006–2009)
- Michael Crozier (2009–2010)
- Chris Simmons (2010–2013)
- John Boscawen (2013–2014)
- John Thompson (2014–2017)
- Ruwan Premathilaka (2017–2019)
- Tim Jago (2019–2023)
- Henry Lynch (2023–2024)
- John Windsor (2024–)

=== Vice presidents ===
- David Schnauer (1999–2000)
- Rodney Hide (2000–2001)
- Vince Ashworth (2001–2004)
- John Ormond (2004–2006)
- Trevor Loudon (2006–2008)
- Michael Crozier (2008–2009)
- Dave Moore (2009–2010)
- Bruce Haycock (2010–2014)
- Beth Houlbrooke (2014–2016)
- Heather Anderson (2016–2017)
- Michaela Draper (2017–2018)
- Beth Houlbrooke (2018–2020)
- Isaac Henderson (2020–2022)
- Henry Lynch (2022–2023)
- Catherine Isaac (2023–current)

== Elected representatives ==
=== Current members of parliament ===
- David Seymour (2014–present)
- Brooke van Velden (2020–present)
- Nicole McKee (2020–present)
- Andrew Hoggard (2023–present)
- Karen Chhour (2020–present)
- Simon Court (2020–present)
- Todd Stephenson (2023–present)
- Mark Cameron (2020–present)
- Parmjeet Parmar (2023–present)
- Laura McClure (2023–present)
- Cameron Luxton (2023–present)

=== Former members of parliament ===
- Donna Awatere Huata (1996–2003)
- Chris Baillie (2020–2023)
- John Banks (2011–2014)
- John Boscawen (2008–2011)
- Hilary Calvert (2010–2011)
- Deborah Coddington (2002–2005)
- Roger Douglas (2008–2011)
- Gerry Eckhoff (1999–2005)
- Stephen Franks (1999–2005)
- David Garrett (2008–2010)
- Rodney Hide (1996–2011)
- Owen Jennings (1996–2002)
- James McDowall (2020–2023)
- Muriel Newman (1996–2005)
- Richard Prebble (1996–2005)
- Derek Quigley (1996–1999)
- Heather Roy (2002–2011)
- Patricia Schnauer (1996–1999)
- Toni Severin (2020–2023)
- Ken Shirley (1996–2005)
- Damien Smith (2020–2023)
- Kenneth Wang (2004–2005)
- Penny Webster (1999–2002)

== Notable candidates ==
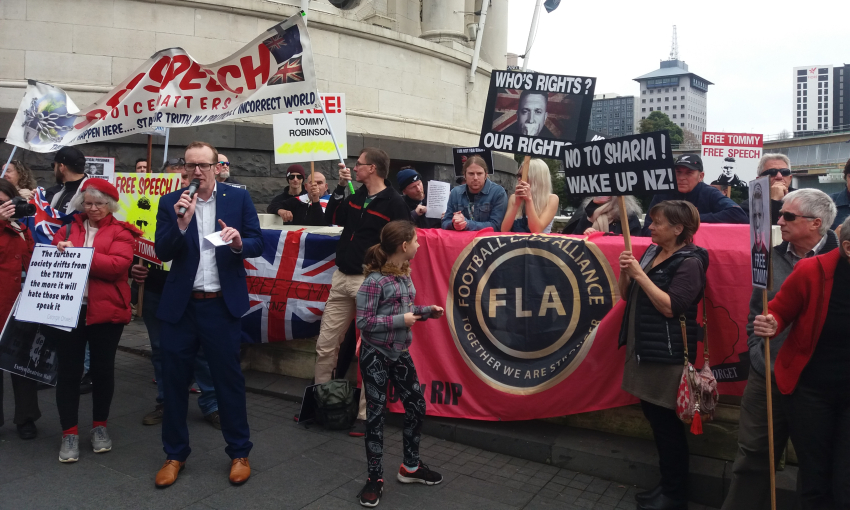
Berry speaking at the free speech protest, Auckland 2018

- Stephen Berry (born 1983), politician, political commentator, internet personality, and comedian. Berry was an ACT candidate in 2014, 2017, 2018, and 2020.
- Allan Birchfield (born 1949/1950), coal and gold miner, chairman of the West Coast Regional Council. Birchfield was an ACT candidate in 2011.
- Barry Brill (born 1940), lawyer, politician, parliamentary under-secretary. Brill was an ACT candidate in 2011.
- Bob Clarkson (born 1939), National Member of Parliament. Clarkson was an ACT candidate in 2011.
- Andrew Falloon (born 1983), National Member of Parliament. Falloon was an ACT list candidate in 2005 and 2008.
- Jo Giles (1950–2011), television presenter and representative sportswoman. Giles was an ACT candidate in 2005.
- Catherine Isaac, president of ACT New Zealand, managing director of Awaroa Partners, former director of JM Communications. Isaac was an ACT list candidate in 2011.
- John Lithgow (1933–2004), National Member of Parliament. Lithgow was an ACT candidate in Whanganui in 1996.
- Garry Mallett (born 1960/1961), politician, fourth President of ACT New Zealand, former owner-operator of a Hamilton branch of Les Mills International. Mallett was an ACT candidate in Hamilton West in 1996, Hamilton East in 2005, Hamilton East in 2008.
- Dick Quax (1948–2018), Dutch-born New Zealand runner, one-time world record holder in the 5000 metres, and local-body politician. Quax was an ACT candidate in 1999 and 2002.
- Graham Scott (born 1942), official of the New Zealand government. Scott was an ACT candidate in 2005.

== See also ==
- Historic liberalism in New Zealand
- List of libertarian political parties
- Rogernomics (1984–1988)
- Ruthanasia (1990–1993)
