= Hugo Judd =

New Zealand diplomat and public servant (1939–2017)

Hugo Judd CVO QSO
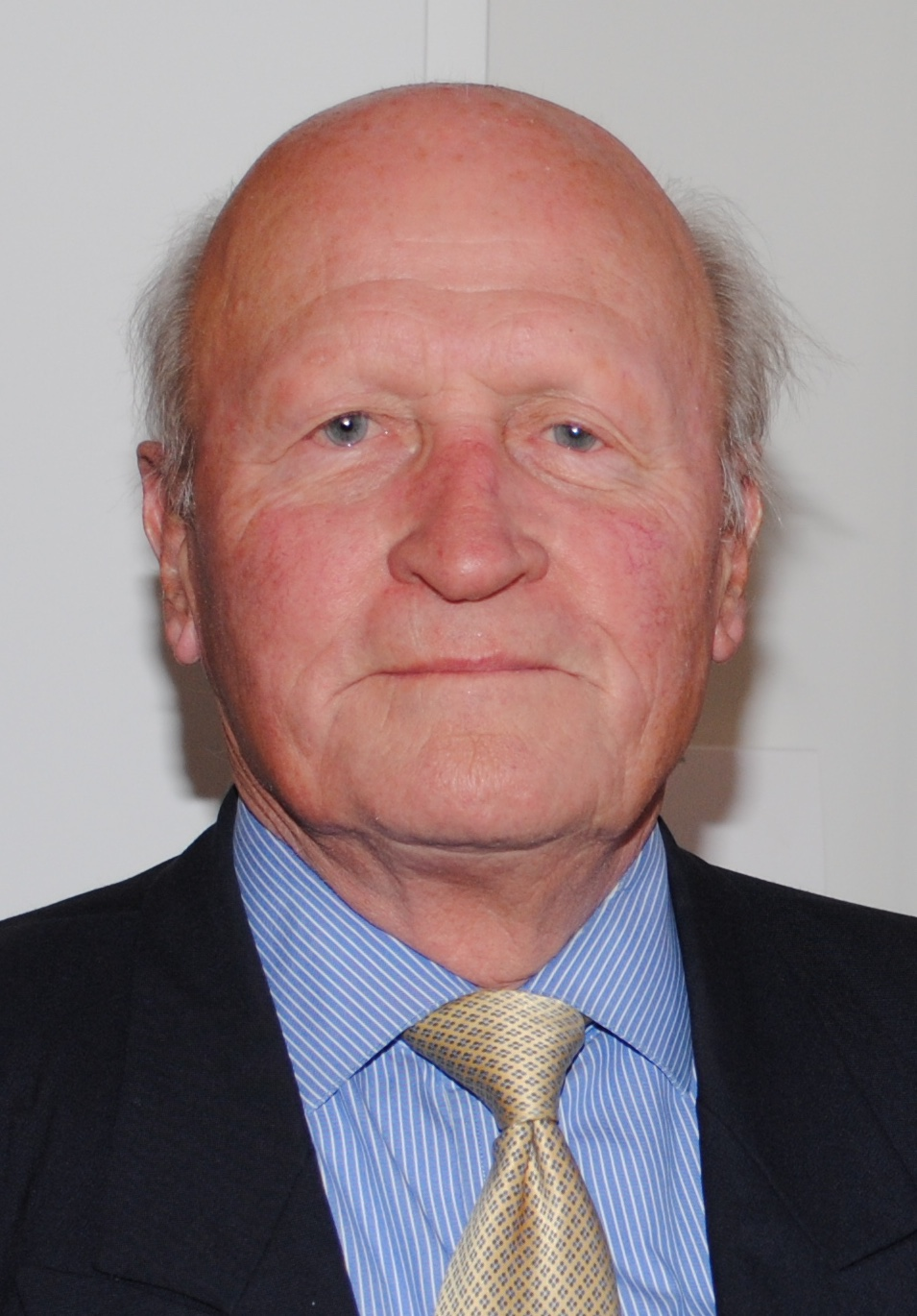
- Judd in 2010

Official Secretary to the Governor-General of New Zealand
- In office 1993–2004
- Governor-General: Catherine Tizard; Michael Hardie Boys; Silvia Cartwright
- Preceded by: Ken Richardson
- Succeeded by: Tia Barrett

New Zealand Ambassador to Austria
- In office 1 January 1982 – 10 June 1985
- Preceded by: Francis Anthony Small
- Succeeded by: Donald James Walker

New Zealand Chargé d'Affaires in the Soviet Union
- In office 1 August 1973 – 1 April 1974
- Preceded by: Desmond Patrick Costello
- Succeeded by: Brian Sydney Lendrum

Personal details
- Born: Neville Hugo Sale Judd; 27 December 1939 Victoria, British Columbia, Canada
- Died: 2 May 2017 (aged 77) Māpua, New Zealand
- Spouse(s): Catherine Anne Isaac (m. 1973, divorced) Sue Morgan
- Children: 3
- Education: Cathedral Grammar School; Christ's College
- Alma mater: Canterbury University College (BA, 1961); University of Oxford (BA, 1963)

Neville Hugo Sale Judd CVO QSO (27 December 1939 – 2 May 2017) was a New Zealand diplomat and public servant.

== Early life and family ==
Born in Victoria, British Columbia, Canada, on 27 December 1939, Judd was the son of Edwin Judd and Violet Judd (née Sale). After emigrating to New Zealand in 1946, he was educated in Christchurch at Cathedral Grammar School, and then Christ's College. He went on to study at Canterbury University College, graduating BA in 1961, and the University of Oxford, where he completed a second BA in 1963. While at Oxford he was awarded a blue for gymnastics.

Judd became a naturalised New Zealand citizen in 1957. In 1973 he married Catherine Isaac, and the couple had three sons. They later divorced and Judd married Sue Morgan.

== Career ==
In 1964, Judd joined the Ministry of External Affairs. In 1965 he was employed in the external economic division of the Treasury. From 1966 to 1968, he served at the New Zealand Mission to the United Nations in Geneva, and then, from 1968 to 1971, at New Zealand's embassy in Saigon. He then returned to New Zealand and worked in the economic division of the Ministry of Foreign Affairs from 1971 to 1973, before taking another overseas posting as New Zealand's chargé d'affaires in Moscow. Between 1975 and 1978, Judd was director of administration at the Ministry of Foreign Affairs. From 1978 to 1982 he was minister at the New Zealand embassy in Washington, D.C., and between 1982 and 1985, he served as New Zealand's ambassador to Austria, with accreditation in Hungary, Poland, Czechoslovakia, East Germany, and Romania. In 1986, he was appointed spokesman and assistant secretary at the Ministry of External Relations and Trade.

Judd served as the official secretary to the Governor-General of New Zealand from 1994 until his retirement in 2004.

== Honours ==
Judd was appointed a Commander of the Royal Victorian Order in 1995. In the 2008 New Year Honours Judd was appointed a Companion of the Queen's Service Order for public services.

== Later life and death ==
Judd moved to Nelson in October 2004, and served as a member of the Bishop Suter Art Gallery Trust Board. He died at his home in Māpua near Nelson on 2 May 2017.
