= We're Here to Help =

- Promotional poster
- Directed by: Jonothan Cullinane
- Written by: Jonothan Cullinane
- Produced by: John Barnett; Paul Davis
- Starring: Erik Thomson; Miriama Smith; Michael Hurst; Jason Hoyte
- Cinematography: John Cavill
- Edited by: David Coulson
- Music by: David Long
- Production company: South Pacific Pictures
- Release date: 8 November 2007
- Running time: 93 minutes
- Country: New Zealand
- Language: English

We're Here to Help is a 2007 Kafkaesque comedy film written and directed by Jonothan Cullinane and starring Erik Thomson, Miriama Smith, and Michael Hurst. It was produced by South Pacific Pictures.

== Plot ==
Based on a true story, Dave Henderson was audited 27 times from 1992 to 1995 after claiming a GST refund, and the Inland Revenue Department demanded he pay $NZ924,341.07 in taxes and penalties. He was charged with fraud, his business failed and he was bankrupted and had to sell his house. The IRD eventually conceded that he did not owe it $NZ924,341.07, and fraud charges against him were dropped. They also admitted that they owed him $NZ64,000.

== Cast ==
Actor	Role
Erik Thomson	Dave Henderson
Miriama Smith	Kath Harper
Michael Hurst	Rodney Hide
Jason Hoyte	Steve Arnett
John Leigh	Lesley Costello
Stephen Papps	Doug Johnson
Peter Elliott	Bill Birch
Gabriel Reid	Jeremy Griffin
