= Catherine Isaac =

New Zealand politician

- Other name: Catherine Judd
- Known for: Involvement in the Act Party

Catherine Isaac is a former president and current vice-president of the New Zealand political party ACT, and managing director of Awaroa Partners. She was formerly director of JM Communications.

== Early life ==
Isaac was raised in Christchurch and completed a BA in English and Languages at the University of Canterbury in 1970. She is the niece of Diana Isaac.

== Career ==
=== Before politics ===
Isaac was communications and public affairs manager for the National Provident Fund through its extensive restructuring from 1988 to 1991. In the 18 month lead-up to the completion of the NPF tender process Isaac was also General Manager, Regional Operations, responsible for management of six regional offices and five branch offices.

Isaac was a member of the Board of the Wellington Community Trust from 1999 to 2003.

She was a founding director of the St Lukes' Group from 1993 to 1996. From 1990 to 1994 she was a Trustee of the Royal New Zealand Ballet. From 1995 to 2001 she served on the Board of Trustees of Wellington College.

=== Presidency of ACT New Zealand, 2001–2006 ===
Isaac was elected President of ACT New Zealand in March 2001. Her bid for the presidency was support by the founders of ACT, Sir Roger Douglas and Derek Quigley. A key feature of her presidency was the Liberal Project, which was designed to focus the party on its classical liberal roots. However her moves to get the party more focussed on liberal issues were relatively unsuccessful, and in the 2002 election the party largely repeated its socially conservative positions which it had used in 1999.

Isaac was one of a handful of people that Richard Prebble confided in prior to announcing to the ACT caucus on 27 April 2004 that he intended to retire as leader of the party. Isaac oversaw the membership primary that the party ran to assist in selecting a new leader. Rodney Hide was selected following the primary and a caucus vote.

Isaac announced publicly in January 2006 that she would not be standing for re-election as party president. She stepped down at the March 2006 annual conference and was replaced by Hamilton businessman Garry Mallett.

=== Since retiring as president of ACT ===
Isaac stood for parliament in the 2011 election. She was ranked second on ACT's party list, but did not stand as an electorate candidate because of her husband's illness. Because of ACT's low vote-share, she was not elected to Parliament.

Isaac was involved in a number of the Fifth National Government's initiatives, including the Welfare Working Group, and the Partnership Schools/Kura Hourua Working Group. She was Chair of the Kura Hourua Authorisation Board. However, after the Sixth Labour Government was elected, the Board resigned in protest at the end of their term on 1 March 2018 because the Government was abolishing the Partnership Schools model.

== Personal life ==
She is divorced from diplomat Hugo Judd. She subsequently married former Business Roundtable director Roger Kerr in 2010, who died in 2011.
