= Trevor Loudon =

New Zealand author, activist, and far-right conspiracy theorist

- Loudon in 2010
- Occupations: Author, speaker, blogger
- Political party: ACT New Zealand

Trevor Loudon is a New Zealand author, speaker, political activist, blogger, and far-right conspiracy theorist. He was vice president of ACT New Zealand, a classical liberal and right-libertarian political party from 2006 to 2008.

Loudon is the author of five self-published books on U.S. politics, and was featured in a 2016 documentary titled Enemies Within. He also founded the website KeyWiki.org, a wiki-format project, which contains articles on left-wing and centre-left political groups, as well as articles about non-famous individuals within communist parties, primarily in the United States, and lists the names of their members.

== Career ==
Trevor Loudon speaking at pro-Israel rally in Washington, DC in March 2015

=== Campaign for a Soviet-Free New Zealand ===
Loudon has been involved in politics in Christchurch for many years, such as the Campaign for a Soviet-Free New Zealand (CFSFNZ), a group which published dossiers on people involved in the anti-nuclear movement, declaring them to be communists and "connecting the dots" between them and their supposed Soviet masters. Loudon established the Campaign for a Soviet-Free New Zealand in June 1986 to expose 'Soviet/Marxist subversion' in New Zealand. Loudon argued that the New Zealand government should cease all diplomatic and trading relations with the Soviet Union on the grounds that it was a hostile, totalitarian dictatorship seeking world dominance. The group advocated a ban on the importing of Soviet Nova and Lada cars on the grounds that they had been built through slave labour. Other activities carried out by the CFSFNZ included staging protests, collecting information on the Labour Party and left-wing groups, and circulating pamphlets in Christchurch during the 1987 New Zealand general elections which attacked the Fourth Labour Government and local Christchurch-based Members of Parliament Mike Moore and Geoffrey Palmer.

Loudon became the public face of the Campaign for a Soviet-Free New Zealand. In addition to his anti-Communist and pro-ANZUS stance, Loudon claimed that New Zealand's communist parties particularly the Socialist Unity Party and their front organisations had infiltrated the Labour Party, trade union movement, National Council of Churches, and left-wing groups like the Council of Organizations for Relief Services Overseas (CORSO) and the anti-apartheid Halt All Racist Tours. By 1987, the group had a mailing list of about 800 people. It also maintained links with other conservative groups including Stanley Newman's pro-ANZUS Plains Club, the Coalition of Concerned Citizens and some Christian groups. The CSFNZ also published its own newspaper which ran from May 1988 to November 1990.

=== U.S. politics ===
In June 2019 he was a scheduled speaker at a conference run by a group called "Texans Against Communism" in partnership with "Texans United for America" along with the leader of the Proud Boys and Joey Gibson of Patriot Prayer. There were around 20 attendees.

== Personal life ==
He is a self-described student of the Zenith Applied Philosophy which has a world view which is a combination of Scientology, Eastern mysticism and the anti-communist ideas of the American John Birch Society. In 2006 he wrote on his blog that he had "studied at Z.A.P. from 1976 to 1982, 1986/7 and 1999 to current. I am enjoying my studies immensely at the moment and plan to continue indefinitely."

== Self-published books ==
- Barack Obama and the Enemies Within. CreateSpace, 2011. ISBN 978-0615490748.
- The Enemies Within: Communists, Socialists and Progressives in the U.S. Congress. CreateSpace, 2013. ISBN 978-1490575179.
- White House Reds: Communists, Socialists & Security Risks Running for US President, 2020. CreateSpace, 2020. ISBN 979-8614830618.
- Comrade Prime Minister.
- Godzone's Enemies.
- Stealth: Kamala Harris's Communist roots.
