= Surrogacy in New Zealand =

Surrogacy is legal in New Zealand if it is performed altruistically, where the surrogate donates her services selflessly, without any compensation beyond the coverage of expenses. Commercial surrogacy, where the surrogate is paid in addition to the coverage of expenses, is not legal. There is a lack of specific legislation and regulations dealing with surrogacy, though the recent increase in surrogacy cases has led to a number of amendments. New Zealand is party to the United Nations Convention on the Rights of the Child, and ratified it in April 1993. The primary principle of this convention is that the best interests of the child are paramount, which must then encompass all surrogacy agreements and regulations. The lack of clear surrogacy legislation in New Zealand has led to many couples engaging in reproductive tourism in order to ensure the surrogacy is successful. This has the potential to significantly impact the human rights of all of the parties involved.

== Domestic surrogacy laws ==
New Zealand has no specific surrogacy legislation. However, there are provisions in other acts that relate to surrogacy arrangements. The Human Assisted Reproductive Technology Act 2004 (“HART Act”) is the primary instrument that deals with the legality of surrogacy. The purpose of the HART Act was to create regulations for cases involving human assisted reproduction, but the lack of specific surrogacy legislation has led to the HART Act encompassing all surrogacy cases within New Zealand.

The HART Act provides that surrogacy arrangements are not, of themselves, illegal, but are not enforceable by or against any person. The HART Act also makes it illegal to give or receive valuable consideration for participating in or arranging surrogacy, but also provides that there may be exceptions to this, being situations where reasonable and necessary expenses are incurred. The provision that surrogacy arrangements are not enforceable against any person seems to offer little protection for any of the parties involved; none of the parties are able to ensure that the agreement is fulfilled. Any dispute regarding a baby born of surrogacy will be resolved by the Family Court, and the judge will make their decision in the best interests of the child.

The Guidelines on Surrogacy Arrangements involving Assisted Reproductive Procedures state that the approval of an ethics committee must be obtained before surrogacy agreements are allowed to proceed. The Ethics Committee on Assisted Reproductive Technology must determine, among other mandatory considerations and requirements, that:

1. Where there is one intending parent, he or she will be a genetic parent of any resulting child; or
2. Where there are two intending parents, at least one will be a genetic parent of any resulting child; and
3. There has been discussion, understanding, and declared intentions between the parties about the day-to-day care, guardianship, and adoption of any resulting child, and any ongoing contact; and
4. Each party has received independent medical advice; and
5. Each party has received independent legal advice; and
6. Each party has received counselling in accord with the current Fertility Services Standard;

The Adoption Act 1955 is also relevant to surrogacy, as, under the Act, it is an offence to give or receive any payment or reward in consideration of an adoption or proposed adoption, and a child must be adopted by the genetic or intending parents in order for them to have any legal status in relation to the child. The Status of Children Act 1969 further provides that the birth mother, the surrogate, is the child's legal mother irrespective of the genetic origins of the child, and the legal father is the surrogate's partner if he has consented to the surrogacy.

The lack of specific legislation regarding surrogacy arrangements has led to calls for the law to be reformed, specifically reform to allow commercial surrogacy.

== International treaties affecting surrogacy ==
New Zealand is bound by the international agreements to which it is party, including the Universal Declaration of Human Rights, the United Nations Convention on the Rights of the Child, the Convention on the Elimination of All Forms of Discrimination against Women and the International Covenant on Civil and Political Rights.

The Convention on the Rights of the Child provides that ratifying states, of which New Zealand is one, must act in the best interests of the child, and that every child has basic rights, including the right to life and the right to be raised by their parents within a family.

The Universal Declaration of Human Rights provides for basic human rights, to which every party in a surrogacy agreement is entitled. While an unborn child does not have the right to life in New Zealand, once the child is born, it is subject to the full rights accorded every person in international law.

== Adoption of the child ==
Once a child has been born as a result of a surrogacy agreement the child will then need to be formally adopted by the intended parents. The Adoption Act 1955 governs this and deals with matters such as whose consent is required and who are the legal parents. If a child was born overseas and was brought to New Zealand a temporary visa must be granted to the child and the habitual residence must then be decided by the court. If the court concludes that the child is a habitual resident of New Zealand the Adoption Act 1955 applies, however if it concludes that it is the resident of another State then the Adoption (Intercountry) Act 1997 will apply to the situation. The Court of Appeal set a test whereby the habitual residence of a child could be decided upon. Broadly, test is to look at the intentions of the parents and where they intended the child to be residence of.

There has been large debate over whether there have been breaches of human rights in surrogacy cases. It is clear that the right against discrimination is a fundamental human right. On the international scale the Universal Declaration of Human Rights creates such protection and at the domestic level the Human Rights Act 1993, in particular section 21. Same-sex couples have, for a significant number of years, been arguing that they should have the right to enter into surrogacy agreements. In 2013 same-sex marriage was legalised in New Zealand due to an amendment to the Marriage Act 1955. The court has the power to make an adoption order “on the application of 2 spouses jointly in respect of a child” under section 3 of the Adoption Act. There has been much debate as to whether same-sex couples fulfil the definition of “spouse” for the purposes of the Adoption Act however since the legalisation of same-sex marriage the courts have now concluded that they do fall within the required definition. This was affirmed by the family court in the case of In the Matter of C (Adoption) [2008] NZFLR 141. The implication of this appears to be that this argument, pertaining to human rights breaches towards same-sex couples in adoption and surrogacy cases, have been nullified as the courts may now make an adoption orders to same-sex couples.

== International surrogacy arrangements ==
As New Zealand does not allow commercial surrogacy, many New Zealand couples are choosing to enter into international commercial surrogacy arrangements. This involves the birth of a child to a surrogate mother in one country, where the genetic or intending parents are from another country. There is no specific legislation in New Zealand that addresses international surrogacy arrangements, thus in all cases where couples arrange for a child to be born overseas and brought back to New Zealand, all New Zealand law will apply. These arrangements have significant legal complexities, as well as a high risk of humanitarian problems that may affect the surrogate mother and the child.

The Ministry for Vulnerable Children has issued country warnings for jurisdictions that potential parents are advised to avoid, which include:

- Cambodia
- India
- Nepal
- Thailand

== Human rights implications ==
The increase in international surrogacy arrangements have led to a number of concerns about the human rights of the child, the surrogate mother and the genetic or intended parents.

=== Right to family life ===
When a child is born via an international surrogacy arrangement, under New Zealand law, the genetic or intending parents will have no legal relationship to the child when it is born; the child's legal parents will be the surrogate mother and her partner. This could arguably breach the right to family life, as while the surrogate mother carried and gave birth to the child, she does not necessarily have a familial link. The HART Act provides that children have the right to information about their biological background and genetic origins; this would suggest that the child has the inherent legal right to know their family, irrespective of the lack of legal rights of the genetic parents.

=== Right to nationality and citizenship ===
Under the Convention on the Rights of the Child and the ICCPR, a child is entitled to a nationality from birth. This right is often violated in practice in international surrogacy arrangements, where the relevant nations refuse to recognise a child born through these arrangements as a national, as the laws in each country are often conflicting in relation to the child's legal parentage and nationality. If it is not possible to determine a child's nationality, it will not be able to obtain a passport in order to travel and remedy the statelessness and lack of parentage. While the country of the child's birth may recognise the intended or genetic parents as the child's legal parents, New Zealand does not. Children born as a result of an international surrogacy arrangement do not meet the requirements for New Zealand citizenship by descent, and thus the only way that the intended parents may become the child's legal parents is through adoption.

Adoption in New Zealand after an international surrogacy arrangement is complex, as New Zealand is signatory and is bound by the Hague Convention on Protection and Co-operation in Respect to Intercountry Adoption, which was brought into New Zealand law by the Adoption (Intercountry) Act 1997. These enactments apply “where a child who is habitually resident in one Contracting State… has been, is being or is to be moved to another Contracting State”. While these enactments deal with international adoption and not specifically with international surrogacy, they have been used by the New Zealand courts where the child has already been brought back to New Zealand by the intending parents to go through the adoption process. The Family Court has tended to find that intercountry adoption requirements do not apply in such cases, as the child born in an international surrogacy arrangement is intended to have the same habitual residence as the intended parents, not where the child was born, which is often the surrogate mother's habitual residence, as they often do not have legally identifiable parents in that location. Further, the Convention on the Rights of the Child states that, in adoptions, the best interests of the child are paramount, especially where there is intercountry adoption.

=== Right to know parents ===
The Convention on the Rights of the Child also provides that a child shall have the right to know and be cared for by its parents, and it shall not be separated from them. In surrogacy arrangements, the intended or genetic parents are arguably the child's parents, not the surrogate mother or her partner. Yet, the law surrounding surrogacy fails to recognise this, and instead provides that the legal parents of the child are the surrogate mother and her partner. This could be an issue where the genetic parents of the child are culturally different to that of the surrogate mother, which is often true of international surrogacy arrangements.

=== Rights of the surrogate mother ===
One of the concerns that arises in international surrogacy arrangements is the rights of the surrogate mother, especially when it comes to informed consent and exploitation. It is accepted that in no circumstances should the surrogate mother be forced by the intended parents or anyone else to enter into a surrogacy arrangement. In all cases, there should be informed consent before the surrogacy arrangement can proceed. Before allowing a child a temporary travel visa to enter New Zealand in order to be adopted, the Ministry of Immigration will consider whether there has been informed consent from the surrogate mother. However, it has been widely questioned whether women in impoverished countries can actually give informed consent to surrogacy arrangements. Women in impoverished countries where international surrogacy arrangements usually take place are often uneducated and poor, and therefore may not be able to fully comprehend all of the implications of surrogacy, and therefore, the idea of a high payment may become a form of coercion or undue influence.

The high prices paid by intending or genetic parents may also lead to unfair requirements being placed on the surrogate mother during the pregnancy, which may interfere with her right to privacy and right to self-determination. For example, the intending parents may require that the surrogate mother not travel to certain places or do certain things while she is pregnant, in order to protect the pregnancy and the child.

== Surrogacy law reform ==
In 2005, the New Zealand Law Commission made recommendations to reform the law related to surrogacy. These recommendations were not advanced by successive Governments. Calls to reform to the way surrogacy is regulated have since grown. In September 2019, a 30,000 signature petition was submitted to the House of Representatives calling for an overhaul of the surrogacy process. In August 2020, the Law Commission announced that Minister of Justice Andrew Little had referred a review of surrogacy laws to the commission as a new project for the 2020/21 year. The commission announced the Terms of Reference for that review on 8 March 2020 with the name Te Kōpū Whāngai: He Arotake | Review of Surrogacy.

== See also ==
- Children's rights
- Convention on the Elimination of All Forms of Discrimination Against Women
- Declaration of the Rights of the Child
- Human assisted reproduction
- Human rights
- Surrogacy
- Women's rights
